= Polymorphous perversity =

Freudian theory

Polymorphous perversity (German: polymorph perverse Anlage) is Sigmund Freud's descriptive term for the non-specific nature of childhood sexuality in its primordial form. In psychoanalytic theory, infantile sexual energy (libido) is yet to be definitively channelled into specific aims and objects, and is capable of focusing itself in any direction and on any object. The term points to the amorphous and changeable nature of the libido prior to being shaped in the processes of socialization and psycho-sexual development. Sexual pleasure in this sense is not merely genital, but potentially present in all sensual interactions, including touching, smelling, sucking, viewing, exhibiting, rocking, defecating, urinating, hurting, and being hurt. It is this original non-specificity of the libido in early childhood that makes possible the variations of the sexual drive that later manifest as so-called 'perversions' in the adult.

== Freud's theory ==
Freud theorized that some are born with unfocused pleasure/libidinal drives, deriving pleasure from any part of the body. The objects and modes of pleasurable satisfaction are multifarious, directed at every object that might provide pleasure. Polymorphous perverse sexuality continues from infancy through about age five, progressing through three distinct developmental stages: the oral stage, anal stage, and genital/phallic stage. Only in subsequent developmental stages do children learn to constrain drives towards pleasure-satisfaction to socially accepted norms, culminating in adult heterosexual behavior focused on the genitals and reproduction or sublimations of the procreative drive.

Freud thought that during this stage of undifferentiated impulse for pleasure, incestuous and bisexual urges are normal. Lacking knowledge that certain modes of gratification are forbidden, the polymorphously perverse child seeks gratification wherever it occurs. In the earliest phase, the oral phase, the child forms a libidinal bond with the mother via the inherent pleasure gained from suckling at the breast.

For Freud, "perversion" is a non-judgmental term. He used it to designate behavior outside the socially acceptable norms of his era.

== See also ==
- Oedipus complex
- Sexual fetishism
- Paraphilia

== Sources ==
- Freud, Sigmund (1962). Three Essays on the Theory of Sexuality, trans. James Strachey. New York: Basic Books.
  - (1996). Drei Abhandlungen zur Sexualtheorie. Fischer: Frankfurt am Main. [Reprint of the 1905 edition.]
