= Castration complex =

Psychoanalytic concept

The castration complex is a concept developed by Sigmund Freud, first presented in 1908, initially as part of his theorisation of the transition in early childhood development from the polymorphous perversity of infantile sexuality to the ‘infantile genital organisation’ which forms the basis for adult sexuality. The trauma induced by the child’s discovery of anatomical difference between the sexes (presence or absence of the penis) gives rise to the fantasy of female emasculation or castration.

== Phallic stage ==
According to Freud, the early stages of the child’s psychosexual development are characterised by polymorphous perversity and a bisexual disposition, and are the same for both sexes. Up to and including the phallic stage of this development the penis and clitoris are the leading erogenous zones. Once the castration complex is initiated with the child’s discovery and puzzlement over the anatomical difference between the sexes (presence or absence of the penis), it makes the assumption that this difference is due to the female's penis having been cut off or mutilated. The libidinal equivalence of penis/clitoris, based on the recognition by the child of only one genital organ, gives way to the fantasy that females have been castrated. This entails a legacy of castration anxiety for the boy and penis envy for the girl.

== Oedipus Complex ==
Freud argued that the castration complex is closely linked to the Oedipus Complex, especially with its prohibitive and normative function. The structure and consequences of the castration complex are different for the boy and the girl, terminating the Oedipus Complex for the boy, initiating it for the girl. For the boy, anatomical difference (the possession of a penis), induces castration anxiety as a result of an assumed paternal threat made in response to his sexual thoughts and activities. In the case of the girl the absence of a penis is experienced as a deprivation, a wrong suffered which she attempts to deny, remedy or compensate for by seeking to have her own child. Accordingly the girl’s castration complex leads to the redirection of her libidinal desires toward the father and away from the mother, whom she resents for depriving her of the penis, and the concomitant displacement of the clitoris by the vagina as the leading erogenous zone.

== Primal phantasy ==
In his later work Freud includes the castration complex in the category of primal phantasies that are universal in their derivation from the incest taboo, the necessary founding condition for all human social and cultural formations. As such they have their effects independently of the individual subject's specific cultural setting.
