= Anal retentiveness =

Freudian term for obsessive attention to detail

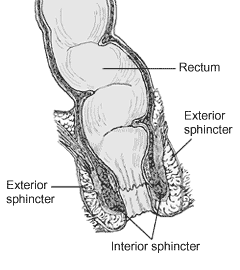
Human anatomy of the anorecturm (anus, rectum, and the relevant sphincters)

Anal retentiveness is a personality trait that is characterized by excessive concern with details. The concept originated in Freudian psychoanalytic theory, where one aspect of the anal stage of psychosexual development is pleasure in the retention of feces. Fixation in this stage can potentially result in a personality marked by frugality, obstinacy and orderliness. Despite its psychoanalytic roots and the literal meaning of the words, in common usage the term generally refers merely to certain kinds of obsessive behaviour.

== Origins ==
In Freudian psychology, the anal stage is said to follow the oral stage of infant or early-childhood development, and occurs from around the age of eighteen months to three years old. The infant's attention moves from oral stimulation to anal stimulation, usually synchronous with learning to control its excretory functions. Freud posited that children who experience conflicts during this stage may develop certain fixations or personality traits. If the association of the libido with the anal erogenous zone and excretory function is not satisfactorily resolved (for example, as a result of the child being too frequently or severely chastised for toilet training accidents), so-called "anal retentive" character traits, such as excessive orderliness, stubbornness, and compulsions for control, may develop at a later stage. If excretory pleasure is overindulged during this period the individual may develop "anal-expulsive" personality traits.

== Influence ==
Freud's theories on early childhood have been influential on the psychological community, and the phrase anal retentive and the term anal survive in common usage. The second edition of the Diagnostic and Statistical Manual (DSM-II) introduced obsessive–compulsive personality disorder (OCPD), with a definition based on Freud's description of anal-retentive personality. According to Kathleen Berger, however, as of 2000 there was no conclusive research linking anal stage conflicts with "anal" personality types.

== See also ==
- Encopresis
- Psychosexual development
