= Phallocentrism =

Idea that the world centers on the phallus

Phallocentrism is the ideology that the phallus, or male sexual organ, is the central element in the organization of the social world. Phallocentrism has been analyzed in literary criticism, psychoanalysis and psychology, linguistics, medicine and health care, and philosophy.

== First phase ==
The term was coined in 1927 by Ernest Jones, as part of his debate with Freud over the role of the phallic stage in childhood development, when he argued that "men analysts have been led to adopt an unduly phallocentric view". Drawing on the earlier arguments of Karen Horney, Jones, in a series of articles, maintained the position that women were not disappointed creatures driven by penis envy. Instead, this belief was itself a theoretical defense against castration anxiety. Freud, however, remained unmoved in his opposition to the Horney/Jones thesis, and his was the predominant psychoanalytic position after that, though some like Janet Malcolm would modify his position to the effect that "Freud's concept, of course, is... a description of phallocentrism, not a recommendation of it".

== Second phase ==
Jacques Lacan added a linguistic turn to the debate with his article "The Signification of the Phallus" (1958/65), arguing that the phallus was not a part-object, an imaginary object, or a physical organ, but rather "the signifier intended to designate as a whole the effects of the signified... this signifying function of the phallus".

Jacques Derrida challenged his thesis as phallocentric, and the charge was taken up by second-wave feminism, extending the focus of protest from Lacan to Freud, psychoanalysis, and male-centered thinking as a whole: the way that "[t]he phallus, the center of meaning, became man's identity with himself... a masculine symbolic".

However, conflict arose within feminism over the issue. Some French feminists, seeing phallocentrism and feminism as two sides of the same coin, sought to make a postphallicist breakthrough. Others, like the English feminist Jacqueline Rose, while accepting that "Lacan was implicated in the phallocentrism he described," nevertheless considered his analysis important for understanding how women were constituted as a split subject in society.

== Third phase ==
From a postcolonial perspective, however, such theoretical debates revealed the irrelevance of first-world feminists, with their phallocentric preoccupations, to the ordinary life of the subaltern woman in the Third World; and third-wave feminism, with its concern for the marginalized, the particular, and for intersectionality, has also broadly seen the theoreticism and essentialism of feminism's earlier concern for phallocentrism as irrelevant to daily female experience. Gayatri Spivak suggests that feminism needs to negotiate with phallocentrism, and phallocentrism must negotiate with feminism.

== See also ==
- Androcentrism
- Ecriture feminine
- Feminist geography
- Gynocriticism
- Male gaze
- Phallic architecture
- Phallic monism
- Phallogocentrism
