= Anal expulsiveness =

Theory by Sigmund Freud

Anal expulsiveness is a theorized state of a person who exhibits cruelty, emotional outbursts, disorganization, self-confidence, artistic ability, generosity, rebelliousness and general carelessness.

Sigmund Freud's psychoanalysis theory claims the anal stage follows the oral stage of infant/early-childhood development. This is a time when an infant's attention moves from oral stimulation to anal stimulation (usually the bowels but occasionally the bladder), usually synchronous with learning to control their excretory functions, a time of toilet training. For children in this stage of development, control of bowel movements is the stage at which they can express autonomy by withholding, refusing to comply, or soiling themselves. Conflicts with bullying parents regarding toilet training can produce a fixation in this stage, which can manifest itself in adulthood by a continuation of erotic pleasure in defecation.

Anal-expulsive refers to a personality trait present in people fixated in the anal stage of psychosexual development. The anal stage is the second of five stages of psychosexual development.

In modern times, psychosexual stages are considered to have limited value in understanding the more severe psychopathology.
