= Phallic monism =

Theory that the presence of a penis is the key psychosexual development

Phallic monism was introduced by Chasseguet-Smirgel to refer to the theory that in both sexes the male organ—i.e. the question of possessing the penis or not—was the key to psychosexual development.

The theory was upheld by Sigmund Freud. His critics maintain it was a result of an unconscious adherence to an infantile sexual theory.

== Freud ==
Freud identified as the central theme of the phallic stage a state of mind in which "maleness exists, but not femaleness. The antithesis here is between having a male genital and being castrated". He believed that the mind-set was shared both by little boys and little girls—a viewpoint shared by the orthodox strand of his following, as epitomised for example in the work of Otto Fenichel.

Freud considered such phallic monism to be at the core of neurosis to the very end of his career.

== Critics ==
Trenchant early criticism of Freud's monism was made by Karen Horney, who suggested that the psychoanalytic view had itself become fixated at the level of the small boy aggrandising himself at his sister's expense. Ernest Jones too was quick to maintain that woman was not, as Freud seemed to suggest, "un homme manqué...struggling to console herself with secondary substitutes alien to her true nature".

Jacques Lacan reformulated Freud's phallic monism through his theory of the phallus as signifier; but Kleinians, post-Kleinians, and those influenced by second-wave feminism have all articulated a more positive view of femininity, articulating the belief in phallic monism as a survival into adulthood of a (male) infantile sexual theory.

Phallic monism has also been linked to sexual fetishism, fueled by an over-aggressive super-ego.

== See also ==
- Amphimixis
- Écriture féminine
- Eros
- Narcissism of small differences
- Phallocentrism
- Penis envy
