= Latent period =

Latent period may refer to:

- Latent period (epidemiology), the time interval between when an individual is infected by a pathogen and when he or she becomes capable of infecting other susceptible individuals.
- Muscle contraction, the time between a stimulus to the nerve and the contraction of the muscle
- Virus latency, a period during which a virus remains dormant in a cell and does not proliferate

== See also ==
- Latency stage, Sigmund Freud's child's psychosexual development model
