= Castration anxiety =

Child's fear of removal of their penis

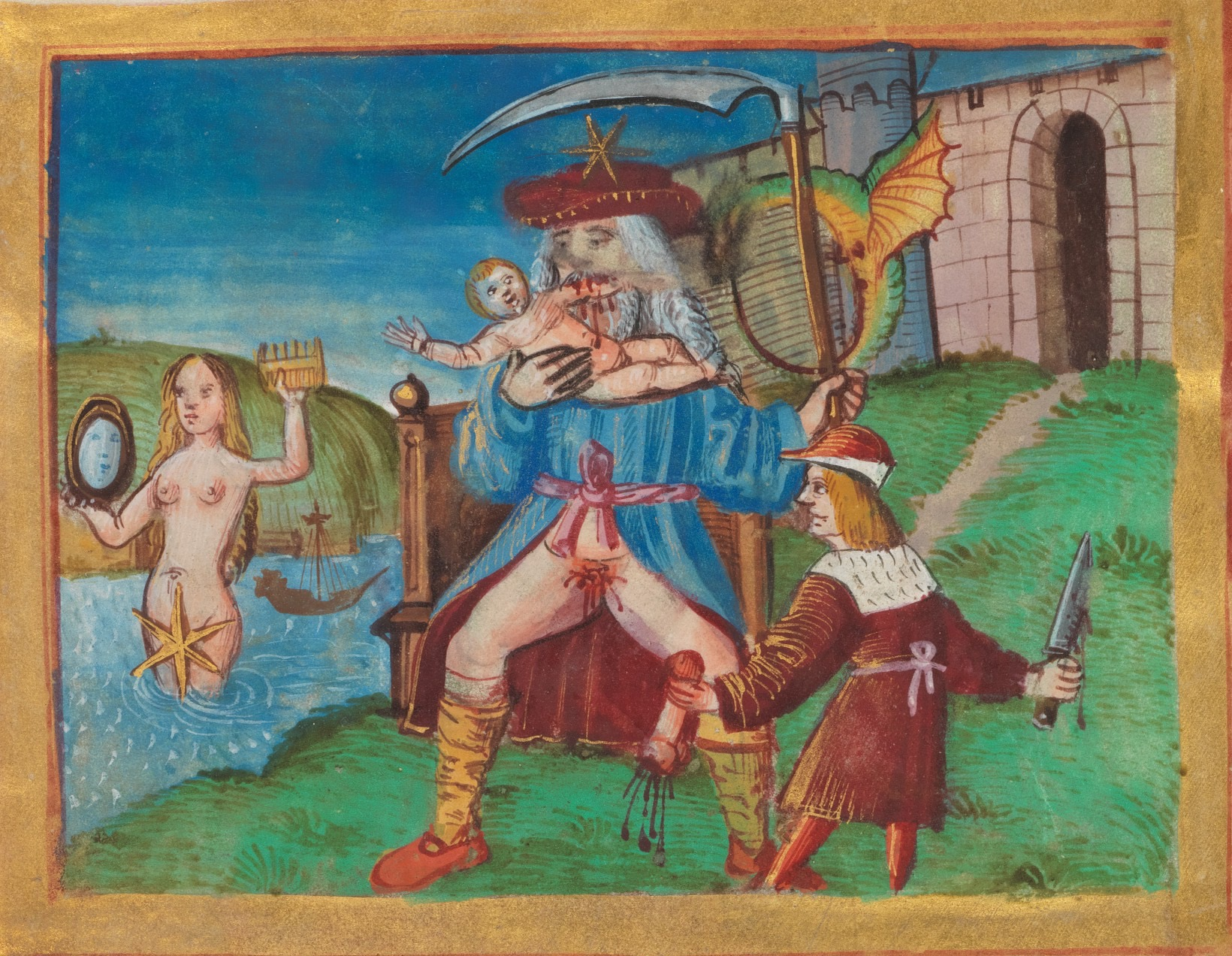
Castration of Uranus by Cronus, c. 1501

Castration anxiety is an overwhelming fear of damage to, or loss of, the penis—a derivative of Sigmund Freud's theory of the castration complex, one of his earliest psychoanalytic theories. The term can refer to the fear of emasculation in both a literal and metaphorical sense.

Freud regarded castration anxiety as a universal human experience. It is thought to begin between the ages of 3 and 5, during the phallic stage of psychosexual development. In Freud's theory, it is the child's perception of anatomical difference (the possession of a penis) that induces castration anxiety as a result of an assumed paternal threat made in response to their sexual proclivities. Although typically associated with males, castration anxiety is thought to be experienced, in differing ways, by both sexes.

== Literal ==
Castration anxiety refers to a child's fear of having their genitalia disfigured or removed as punishment for Oedipal desire. In Freudian psychoanalysis, castration anxiety (Kastrationsangst) refers to an unconscious fear of penile loss that originates during the phallic stage of psychosexual development and continues into adulthood. According to Freud, when the infant male becomes aware of differences between male and female genitalia he assumes that the female's penis has been removed and becomes anxious that his penis will be cut off by his rival, the father figure, as punishment for desiring the mother figure.

In 19th-century Europe, it was not unheard of for parents to threaten their misbehaving sons with castration or otherwise threaten their genitals. This theme is explored in the story Tupik by French writer Michel Tournier in his collection of stories entitled Le Coq de Bruyère (1978) and is a phenomenon Freud documents several times. Kellogg recounts one case of castration used as a cure and punishment for masturbation, although he did not advocate it.

== Metaphorical ==
Castration anxiety can also refer to being castrated symbolically. In the metaphorical sense, castration anxiety refers to the idea of feeling or being insignificant; there is a need to keep one's self from being dominated; whether it be socially or in a relationship. Symbolic castration anxiety refers to the fear of being degraded, dominated or made insignificant, usually an irrational fear where the person will go to extreme lengths to save their pride and/or perceive trivial things as being degrading making their anxiety restrictive and sometimes damaging. This can also tie in with literal castration anxiety in fearing the loss of virility or sexual dominance.

== Relation to power and control ==
According to Freudian psychoanalysis, castration anxiety can be completely overwhelming to the individual, often breaching other aspects of his or her life. A link has been found between castration anxiety and fear of death. Although differing degrees of anxiety are common, young men who felt the most threatened in their youth tended to show chronic anxiety. Because the consequences are extreme, the fear can evolve from potential disfigurement to life-threatening situations. Essentially, castration anxiety can lead to a fear of death, and a feeling of loss of control over one's life.

To feel so powerless can be detrimental to an individual's mental health. One of the most concerning problems with all of this is the idea that the individual does not recognize that their sexual desires are the cause of the emotional distress. Because of unconscious thoughts, as theorized in the ideas of psychoanalysis, the anxiety is brought to the surface where it is experienced symbolically. This will lead to the fear associated with bodily injury in castration anxiety, which can then lead to the fear of dying or being killed.

== Relation to circumcision ==
Freud had a strongly critical view of circumcision, believing it to be a 'substitute for castration', and an 'expression of submission to the father's will'. This view was shared by others in the psychoanalytic community, such as Wilhelm Reich, Hermann Nunberg, and Jacques Lacan, who stated that there is "nothing less castrating than circumcision!"

Themes central to castration anxiety that feature prominently in circumcision include pain, fear, loss of control (with the child's forced restraint, and in the psychological effects of the event, which may include sensation seeking, and lower emotional stability) and the perception that the event is a form of punishment.

The ritual's origination as a result of Oedipal conflict was tested by examining 111 societies, finding that circumcision is likely to be found in societies in which the son sleeps in the mother's bed during the nursing period in bodily contact with her, and/or the father sleeps in a different hut.

A study of the procedure without anaesthesia on children in Turkey found 'each child looked at his penis immediately after the circumcision 'as if to make sure that all was not cut off'. Another study of 60 males subject to communal circumcision ceremonies in Turkey found that 21.5% of them "remembered that they were specifically afraid that their penis might or would be cut off entirely," while 'specific fears of castration' occurred in 28% of the village-reared men. Fear of the authoritarian father increased considerably in 12 children.

The figure of Lilith, described as "a hot fiery female who first cohabited with man" presents as an archetypal representation of the first mother of man, and primordial sexual temptation. Male children were said to be at risk of Lilith's wrath for eight days after birth. Deceiving Lilith into believing newborn babies were a girl – letting the boy's hair grow and even dressing him in girl clothes – were said to be the most effective means to avoid her harm, until they were ritually circumcised on the eighth day of life as part of a covenant with God.

The figure of Judith, depicted both as "a type of the praying Virgin... who tramples Satan and harrows Hell," and also as "seducer-assassin" archetypically reflects the dichotomous themes presented by castration anxiety and circumcision: sexual purity, chastity, violence, and eroticism. Judith defeats Assyrian General, Holofernes by cutting his head off – decapitation being an act that Freud equated with castration in his essay, "Medusa's Head".

== Counterpart in females ==
It is implied in Freudian psychology that both girls and boys pass through the same developmental stages: oral, anal, and phallic stages. Freud, however, believed that the results may be different because the anatomy of the different sexes is different.

The counterpart of castration anxiety for females is penis envy. Penis envy, and the concept of such, was first introduced by Freud in an article published in 1908 titled "On the Sexual Theories of Children". The idea was presumed that females/girls envied those (mostly their fathers) with a penis because theirs was taken from them—essentially they were already "castrated". Freud entertained that the envy they experienced was their unconscious wish to be like a boy and to have a penis.

Penis envy, in Freudian psychology, refers to the reaction of the female/young girl during development when she realizes that she does not possess a penis. According to Freud, this was a major development in the identity (gender and sexual) of the girl. The contemporary culture assumes that penis envy is the woman wishing they were in fact a man. This is unrelated to the notion of "small penis syndrome" which is the assumption by the man that his penis is too small. According to Freud's beliefs, girls developed a weaker superego, which he considered a consequence of penis envy.

== Empirical testing ==
Sarnoff et al. surmised that men differ in their degree of castration anxiety through the castration threat they experienced in childhood. Therefore, these men may be expected to respond in different ways to different degrees of castration anxiety that they experience from the same sexually arousing stimulus. The experimenters aimed to demonstrate that in the absence of a particular stimulus, men who were severely threatened with castration, as children, might experience long-lasting anxiety. The researchers claimed that this anxiety is from the repressed desires for sexual contact with women. It was thought that these desires are trying to reach the men's consciousness. The experimenters deduced that unconscious anxiety of being castrated might come from the fear the consciousness has of bodily injury. The researchers concluded that individuals who are in excellent health and who have never experienced any serious accident or illness may be obsessed by gruesome and relentless fears of dying or of being killed.

In another article related to castration anxiety, Hall et al. investigated whether sex differences would be found in the manifestations of castration anxiety in their subject's dreams. The researchers hypothesized that male dreamers would report more dreams that would express their fear of castration anxiety instead of dreams involving castration wish and penis envy. They further hypothesized that women will have a reversed effect, that is, female dreamers will report more dreams containing fear of castration wish and penis envy than dreams including castration anxiety. The results demonstrated that many more women than men dreamt about babies and weddings and that men had more dreams about castration anxiety than women.

== See also ==
- Castration complex
- Anti-Œdipus
- Jacques Lacan
- Genital retraction syndrome
- Luce Irigaray
- Phallic woman
- Phallogocentrism
- Vagina dentata
