= Libido =

Psychological or sexual drive or energy

The libido or sex drive (/lɪˈbiːdoʊ/ lih-BEE-doh; from Latin libīdō, "lust, desire") refers to a psychological energy that, in common parlance, encompasses all forms of sexual desire, but is sometimes also regarded as the driving force behind other needs, such as a mother's love for her infant. The term was originally coined by the Austrian neurologist Sigmund Freud, the pioneer of psychoanalysis. Initially it referred only to specific sexual needs, but he later expanded the concept to a universal desire, with the id being its "great reservoir". As driving energy behind all life processes, libido became the source of the social engagement (maternal love instinct, for example), sexual behaviour, pursuit for nutrition, skin pleasure, knowledge and victory in all areas of self- and species preservation.

Equating the libido with the Eros of Platonic philosophy, Freud further differentiated two inherent operators: the life drive and the death drive. Both aspects are working complementary to each other: While the death drive, also called Destrudo or Thanatos, embodies the principle of 'analytical' decomposition of complex phenomenon, the effect of life drive (Greek Bios) is to reassemble or synthesise the parts of the decomposition in a way that serves the organisms regeneration and reproduction. Freud's most abstract description of libido represents an energetic potential that begins like a bow to tense up unpleasantly (noticeable 'hunger') in order to pleasantly relax again (noticeable satisfaction); its nature is both physical and psychological. Starting from the id in the fertilised egg, libido initiates also the emergence of two further instances: the ego (function of conscious perception), and the superego, which specialises in retrievable storage of experiences (long-term memory). Together with libido as their source, these three instances represent the common core of all branches of psychoanalysis.

From a neurobiological point of view, the inner perception and regulation of the various innate needs are mediated through the nucleus accumbens by neurotransmitters and hormones; in relation to sexuality, these are mainly testosterone, oestrogen and dopamine.

== Different psychological perspectives ==
=== Freud ===
Sigmund Freud defined libido as "the energy, regarded as a quantitative magnitude... of those instincts which have to do with all that may be comprised under the word 'love'." It is the instinctual energy or force, contained in what Freud called the id, the strictly unconscious structure of the psyche. He also explained that it is analogous to hunger, the will to power, and so on insisting that it is a fundamental instinct that is innate in all humans.

Freud pointed out that these libidinal drives can conflict with the conventions of civilised behavior, represented in the psyche by the superego. It is this need to conform to society and control the libido that leads to tension and anxiety in the individual, prompting the use of ego defenses which channel the psychic energy of the unconscious drives into forms that are acceptable to the ego and superego. Excessive use of ego defenses results in neurosis, so a primary goal of psychoanalysis is to make the drives accessible to consciousness, allowing them to be addressed directly, thus reducing the patient's automatic resort to ego defenses.

Freud viewed libido as passing through a series of developmental stages in the individual, in which the libido fixates on different erogenous zones: first the oral stage (exemplified by an infant's pleasure in nursing), then the anal stage (exemplified by a toddler's pleasure in controlling his or her bowels), then the phallic stage, through a latency stage in which the libido is dormant, to its reemergence at puberty in the genital stage (Karl Abraham would later add subdivisions in both oral and anal stages.). Failure to adequately adapt to the demands of these different stages could result in libidinal energy becoming 'dammed up' or fixated in these stages, producing certain pathological character traits in adulthood.

=== Jung ===
Swiss psychiatrist Carl Gustav Jung identified the libido with psychic energy in general. According to Jung, 'energy', in its subjective and psychological sense, is 'desire', of which sexual desire is just one aspect. Libido thus denotes "a desire or impulse which is unchecked by any kind of authority, moral or otherwise. Libido is appetite in its natural state. From the genetic point of view it is bodily needs like hunger, thirst, sleep, and sex, and emotional states or affects, which constitute the essence of libido." It is "the energy that manifests itself in the life process and is perceived subjectively as striving and desire." He describes libido as manifesting through five primary instincts: hunger, sexuality, activity, reflection, and creativity. Duality (opposition) creates the energy (or libido) of the psyche, which Jung asserts expresses itself only through symbols. These symbols may manifest as "fantasy-images" in the process of psychoanalysis, giving subjective expression to the contents of the libido, which otherwise lacks any definite form. Desire, conceived generally as a psychic longing, movement, displacement and structuring, manifests itself in definable forms which are apprehended through analysis.

=== Further psychological and social viewpoints ===
A person may have a desire for sex, but not have the opportunity to act on that desire, or may on personal, moral or religious reasons refrain from acting on the urge. Psychologically, a person's urge can be repressed or sublimated. Conversely, a person can engage in sexual activity without an actual desire for it. Multiple factors affect human sex drive, including stress, illness, pregnancy, and others. A large 2022 review, using more than 620,000 people and 211 studies, found that men had higher sex drives than women on average, and that one-third of women (30-35%) had a higher sex drive than the average man. The study found an 80% overlap in the sex drives of men and women, and that the effects of the difference were "medium" in size. However, a 2024 comprehensive review challenged the interpretation that these self-reported differences reflect inherent biological differences in sexual motivation. Touraille and Ågmo examined evidence from both humans and non-human mammals, finding that sex differences in sexual motivation depend heavily on measurement methods. In rodent studies, when sexual motivation was measured through approach behaviors in procedures without aversive elements, no sex differences emerged. Earlier studies using the Columbia Obstruction Box (where animals crossed electrified grids to reach mates) actually found female rats were more motivated than males, or showed no difference—never finding males superior to females. In non-human primates, observational data from species including gray mouse lemurs, chimpanzees, and bonobos showed comparable rates of sexual activity and numbers of partners between males and females, with both sexes displaying promiscuous mating patterns. In humans, when sexual motivation is measured through automatic physiological responses—including genital arousal to sexual stimuli, attentional allocation to sexual content, implicit motivation tests, and spinal reflex facilitation—sex differences consistently disappear. Touraille and Ågmo suggest that the sex differences found in self-report questionnaires may reflect social learning of sexual scripts, response bias due to gender norms, and the documented lower quality of sexual experiences (including lower orgasm rates and higher rates of pain during intercourse) reported by women, rather than reflecting true differences in underlying sexual motivation. They conclude that males and females across mammalian species, including humans, appear similar with regard to the inherent intensity of sexual motivation.

Other studies have found that women report similar sexual habits as men, such as masturbation frequency, under the impression of a lie detector. The study reported that "sex differences in self-reported sexual behavior (masturbation) were negligible in a bogus pipeline condition in which participants believed lying could be detected."

A 2012 study found that, in couples who has been together at least a year, differences in sex drive were non-significant and more similar than different.

Another 2012 study found that testosterone did not account for sexual differences between men and women.

Certain psychological or social factors can reduce the desire for sex. These factors can include lack of privacy or intimacy, stress or fatigue, distraction, safety social stigma (in women, it can account for a large part of rejecting sex), or depression. Environmental stress, such as prolonged exposure to elevated sound levels or bright light, can also affect libido. Other causes include experience of sexual abuse, assault, trauma, or neglect, body image issues, and anxiety about engaging in sexual activity. Women whose first sexual experience was pleasant report the same sex drive as men.

Individuals with post-traumatic stress disorder (PTSD) may find themselves with reduced sexual desire. Struggling to find pleasure, as well as having trust issues, many with PTSD experience feelings of vulnerability, rage and anger, and emotional shutdowns, which have been shown to inhibit sexual desire in those with PTSD. Reduced sex drive may also be present in trauma victims due to issues arising in sexual function. For women, it has been found that treatment can improve sexual function, thus helping restore sexual desire. Depression and libido decline often coincide, with reduced sex drive being one of the symptoms of depression. Those with depression often report the decline in libido to be far reaching and more noticeable than other symptoms. In addition, those with depression often are reluctant to report their reduced sex drive, often normalizing it with cultural/social values, or by the failure of the physician to inquire about it.

Sexual desires are often an important factor in the formation and maintenance of intimate relationships in humans. A lack or loss of sexual desire can adversely affect relationships. Changes in the sexual desires of any partner in a sexual relationship, if sustained and unresolved, may cause problems in the relationship. The infidelity of a partner may be an indication that a partner's changing sexual desires can no longer be satisfied within the current relationship. Problems can arise from disparity of sexual desires between partners, or poor communication between partners of sexual needs and preferences.

== Biological perspectives ==
=== Endogenous compounds ===
Libido is governed primarily by activity in the mesolimbic dopamine pathway (ventral tegmental area and nucleus accumbens). Consequently, dopamine and related trace amines (primarily phenethylamine) that modulate dopamine neurotransmission play a critical role in regulating libido.

Other neurotransmitters, neuropeptides, and sex hormones that affect sex drive by modulating activity in or acting upon this pathway include:

- Testosterone (directly correlated) – and other androgens
- Estrogen (directly correlated) – and related female sex hormones
- Progesterone (inversely correlated)
- Oxytocin (directly correlated)
- Serotonin (inversely correlated)
- Norepinephrine (directly correlated)
- Acetylcholine

==== Sex hormone levels and the menstrual cycle ====
A woman's desire for sex is correlated to her menstrual cycle, with many women experiencing a heightened sexual desire in the several days immediately before ovulation, which is her peak fertility period, which normally occurs two days before and until two days after the ovulation. This cycle has been associated with changes in a woman's estradiol and testosterone levels during the menstrual cycle. Women whose ovaries are removed before menopause often experience a dramatic loss of libido.

Also, during the week following ovulation, progesterone levels increase, resulting in a woman experiencing difficulty achieving orgasm. As the last days of the menstrual cycle are marked by a higher estrogen level, women's libido may get a boost as a result of the thickening of the uterine lining, which stimulates nerve endings and makes a woman feel aroused. Also, during these days, estrogen levels decline, resulting in a decrease of natural lubrication.

A large study found that testosterone did not reliably predict women's sexual desire at any time point. It provided correlational evidence indicating that circulating estradiol, but not testosterone, was associated with the midcycle peak in women's sexual desire.

Another study found that there is little support for the notion that testosterone is the critical libido hormone for women. It found that, in all other female mammals, only estradiol has been shown to be critical for female sexual motivation and behavior.

A review of 13 studies found that testosterone serum levels were not correlated to women's libido.

A report from the University of Michigan supported this claim, reporting that several studies found no difference in testosterone levels in women who have high levels of desire and those diagnosed with a libido disorder.

Although some specialists disagree with this theory, menopause is still considered by the majority a factor that can cause decreased sexual desire in women. The levels of estrogen decrease at menopause and this usually causes a lower interest in sex and vaginal dryness which makes sex painful. Estrogen helps a woman's sexual drive, contributing to vaginal lubrication.

=== Physical factors ===
Physical factors that can affect libido include endocrine issues such as hypothyroidism, the effect of certain prescription medications (for example flutamide), and the attractiveness and biological fitness of one's partner, among various other lifestyle factors.

Anemia is a cause of lack of libido in women due to the loss of iron during the period.

Smoking tobacco, alcohol use disorder, and the use of certain drugs can also lead to a decreased libido. Moreover, specialists suggest that several lifestyle changes, such as exercising, quitting smoking, reducing consumption of alcohol and using prescription drugs may help increase one's sexual desire.

==== Medications ====
Some people purposefully attempt to decrease their libido through the usage of anaphrodisiacs. Aphrodisiacs, such as dopaminergic psychostimulants, are a class of drugs which can increase libido. On the other hand, a reduced libido is also often iatrogenic and can be caused by many medications, such as hormonal contraception, SSRIs and other antidepressants, antipsychotics, opioids, beta blockers and isotretinoin.

Isotretinoin, finasteride and many SSRIs and SNRIs uncommonly can cause a long-term decrease in libido and overall sexual function, sometimes lasting for months or years after users of these drugs have stopped taking them. These long-lasting effects have been classified as iatrogenic medical disorders, respectively termed post-retinoid sexual dysfunction/post-Accutane syndrome (PRSD/PAS), post-finasteride syndrome (PFS) and post-SSRI sexual dysfunction (PSSD). These three disorders share many overlapping symptoms in addition to reduced libido, and are thought to share a common etiology, but collectively remain poorly-understood and lack effective treatments.

Multiple studies have shown that with the exception of bupropion (Wellbutrin), trazodone (Desyrel) and nefazodone (Serzone), antidepressants generally will lead to lowered libido. SSRIs and SNRIs that typically lead to decreased libido are fluoxetine (Prozac), paroxetine (Paxil), fluvoxamine (Luvox), citalopram (Celexa), sertraline (Zoloft), escitalopram (Lexapro), venlafaxine (Effexor), Duloxetine (Cymbalta), and levomilnacipran (Fetzima). Lowering the dosage of SSRI and SNRI medications has been shown to improve libido in some patients. Other users try enrolling in psychotherapy to solve depression-related issues of libido. However, the effectiveness of this therapy is mixed, with many reporting that it had no or little effect on sexual drive.

Testosterone is one of the hormones controlling libido in human beings, with the correlations being higher for men and less related in women. Emerging research is showing that hormonal contraception methods like oral contraceptive pills (which rely on estrogen and progesterone together) are causing low libido in females by elevating levels of sex hormone-binding globulin (SHBG). SHBG binds to sex hormones, including testosterone, rendering them unavailable. Research is showing that even after ending a hormonal contraceptive method, SHBG levels remain elevated and no reliable data exists to predict when this phenomenon will diminish.

Several studies have found that estrogen-only therapies that produce periovulatory levels of circulating estradiol increase sexual desire in postmenopausal women.

Oral contraceptives lower androgen levels in users, and lowered androgen levels generally lead to a decrease in sexual desire. However, usage of oral contraceptives has shown to typically not have a connection with lowered libido in women.

==== Effects of age ====
Males reach the peak of their sex drive in their teenage years, while females reach it in their thirties. The surge in testosterone hits the male at puberty resulting in a sudden and extreme sex drive which reaches its peak at age 15–16, then drops slowly over his lifetime. In contrast, a female's libido increases slowly during adolescence and peaks in her mid-thirties. Actual testosterone and estrogen levels that affect a person's sex drive vary considerably.

Some boys and girls will start expressing romantic or sexual interest by age 10–12. The romantic feelings are not necessarily sexual, but are more associated with attraction and desire for another. For boys and girls in their preteen years (ages 11–12), at least 25% report "thinking a lot about sex". By the early teenage years (ages 13–14), however, boys are much more likely to have sexual fantasies than girls. In addition, boys are much more likely to report an interest in sexual intercourse at this age than girls. Masturbation among youth is common, with prevalence among the population generally increasing until the late 20s and early 30s. Boys generally start masturbating earlier, with less than 10% boys masturbating around age 10, around half participating by age 11–12, and over a substantial majority by age 13–14. This is in sharp contrast to girls where fewer engage in masturbation before age 13, and only around 25% by age 13–14.

People in their 60s and early 70s generally retain a healthy sex drive, but this may start to decline in the early to mid-70s. Older adults generally develop a reduced libido due to declining health and environmental or social factors. In contrast to common belief, postmenopausal women often report an increase in sexual desire and an increased willingness to satisfy their partner. Women often report family responsibilities, health, relationship problems, and well-being as inhibitors to their sexual desires. Aging adults often have more positive attitudes towards sex in older age due to being more relaxed about it, freedom from other responsibilities, and increased self-confidence. Those exhibiting negative attitudes generally cite health as one of the main reasons. Stereotypes about aging adults and sexuality often regard seniors as asexual beings, doing them no favors when they try to talk about sexual interest with caregivers and medical professionals. Non-western cultures often follow a narrative of older women having a much lower libido, thus not encouraging any sort of sexual behavior for women. Residence in retirement homes has effects on residents' libidos. In these homes, sex occurs, but it is not encouraged by the staff or other residents. Lack of privacy and resident gender imbalance are the main factors lowering desire. Generally, for older adults, being excited about sex, good health, sexual self-esteem and having a sexually talented partner can be factors.

== Sexual desire disorders ==
Sexual desire disorders are more common in women than in men, and women tend to exhibit less frequent desire than men (although this has been subject to debate). Erectile dysfunction may happen to the penis because of lack of sexual desire, but these two should not be confused since the two can commonly occur simultaneously. For example, moderate to large recreational doses of cocaine, amphetamine or methamphetamine can simultaneously cause erectile dysfunction (evidently due to vasoconstriction) while still significantly increasing libido due to heightened levels of dopamine. Although conversely, excessive or very regular/repeated high-dose amphetamine use may damage leydig cells in the male testes, potentially leading to markedly lowered sexual desire subsequently due to hypogonadism. However, in contrast to this, other stimulants such as cocaine and even caffeine appear to lack negative impacts on testosterone levels, and may even increase their concentrations in the body. Studies on cannabis however seem to be exceptionally mixed, with some claiming decreased levels on testosterone, others reporting increased levels, and with some showing no measurable changes at all. This varying data seems to coincide with the almost equally conflicting data on cannabis' effects on sex drive as well, which may be dosage or frequency-dependent, due to different amounts of distinct cannabinoids in the plant, or based on individual enzyme properties responsible for metabolism of the drug. Evidence on alcohol's effects on testosterone however invariably show a clear decrease, however (like amphetamine, albeit to a lesser degree); temporary increases in libido and related sexual behavior have long been observed during alcohol intoxication in both sexes, but likely most noticeable with moderation, particularly in males. Additionally, men often also naturally experience a decrease in their libido as they age due to decreased productions in testosterone.

The American Medical Association has estimated that several million US women have a female sexual arousal disorder, though arousal is not at all synonymous with desire, so this finding is of limited relevance to the discussion of libido. Some specialists claim that women may experience low libido due to some hormonal abnormalities such as lack of luteinising hormone or androgenic hormones, although these theories are still controversial.

== See also ==
- Desire
- Lust
- Sexual arousal
- Sexual attraction
- Sexual desire
- Sexual motivation and hormones
