= Defecation =

Expulsion of feces from the digestive tract

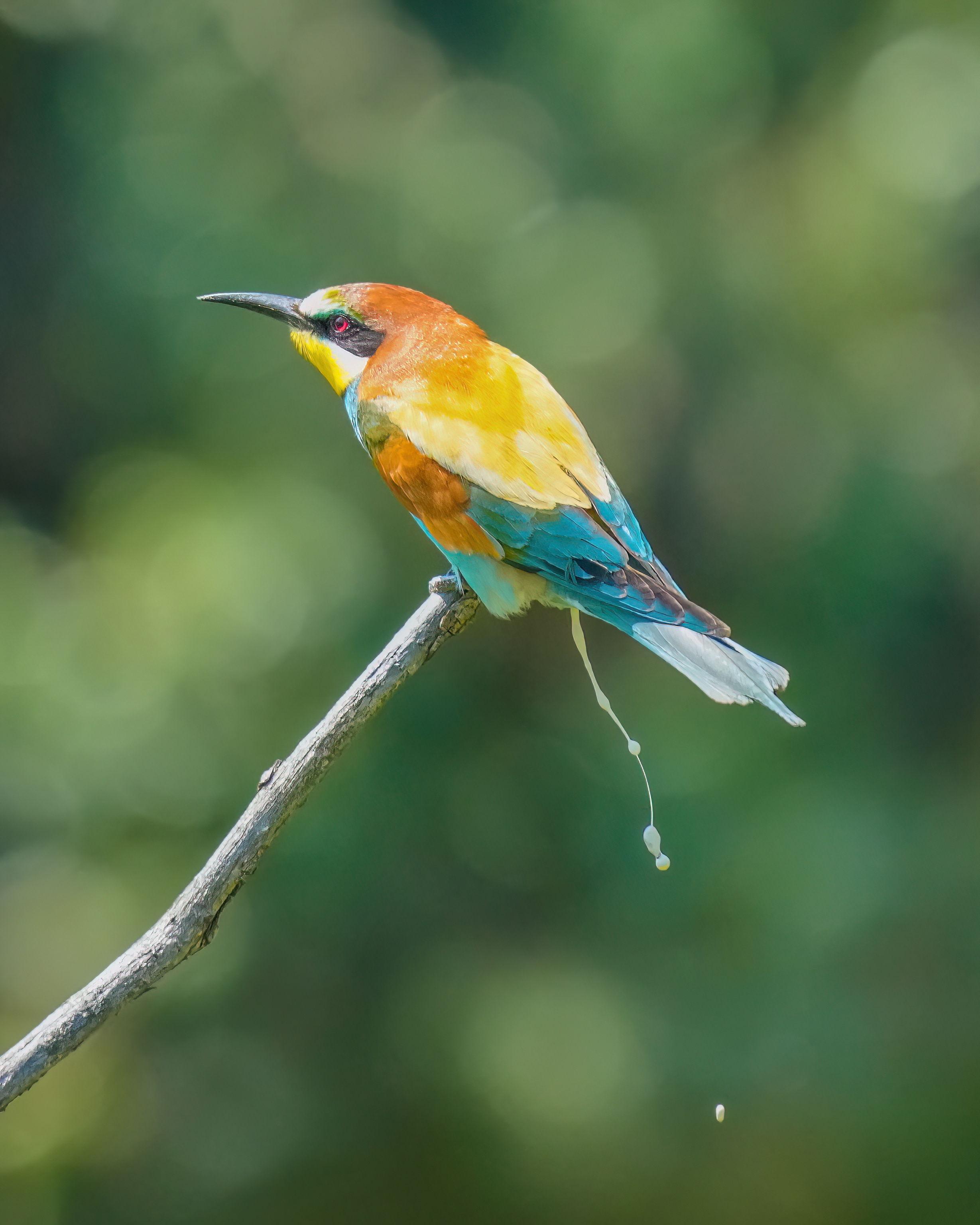
European bee-eater defecating

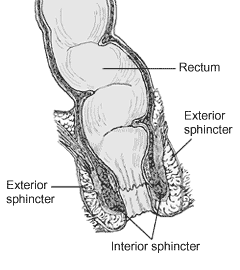
Human anatomy of the anorecturm (anus and rectum)

Defecation (or defaecation) follows digestion and is the necessary biological process by which organisms eliminate a solid, semisolid, or liquid waste material known as feces (or faeces) from the digestive tract via the anus or cloaca. The act has a variety of names, ranging from the technical (e.g. bowel movement), to the common (like pooping or crapping), to the obscene (shitting), to the euphemistic ("doing number two", "dropping a deuce" or "taking a dump"), to the juvenile ("going poo-poo" or "making doo-doo"). The topic, usually avoided in polite company, forms the basis of scatological humor.

Humans expel feces with a frequency varying from a few times daily to a few times weekly. Waves of muscular contraction (known as peristalsis) in the walls of the colon move fecal matter through the digestive tract towards the rectum. Flatus may also be expulsed. Undigested food may also be expelled within the feces, in a process called egestion. When birds defecate, they also expel urine and urates in the same mass, whereas other animals may also simultaneously urinate during defecation, but the processes are spatially separated. Defecation may also accompany childbirth and death. Babies defecate a unique substance called meconium prior to eating external foods.

There are a number of medical conditions associated with defecation, such as diarrhea and constipation, some of which can be serious. A simpler and more mundane concern is the maintenance of anal hygiene, which usually calls for cleaning the area shortly after defecation. The feces expelled can carry diseases, most often through the contamination of food. E. coli is a particular concern.

Before toilet training, human feces are most often collected into a diaper. Thereafter, in many societies people commonly defecate into a toilet. A Western-style flush toilet requires a sitting position, as compared with a squat toilet. However, open defecation, the practice of defecating outside without using a toilet of any kind, is still widespread in some developing countries; some people in those countries defecate into the ocean. Well-developed countries use sewage treatment plants or on-site treatment for blackwater.

== Description ==
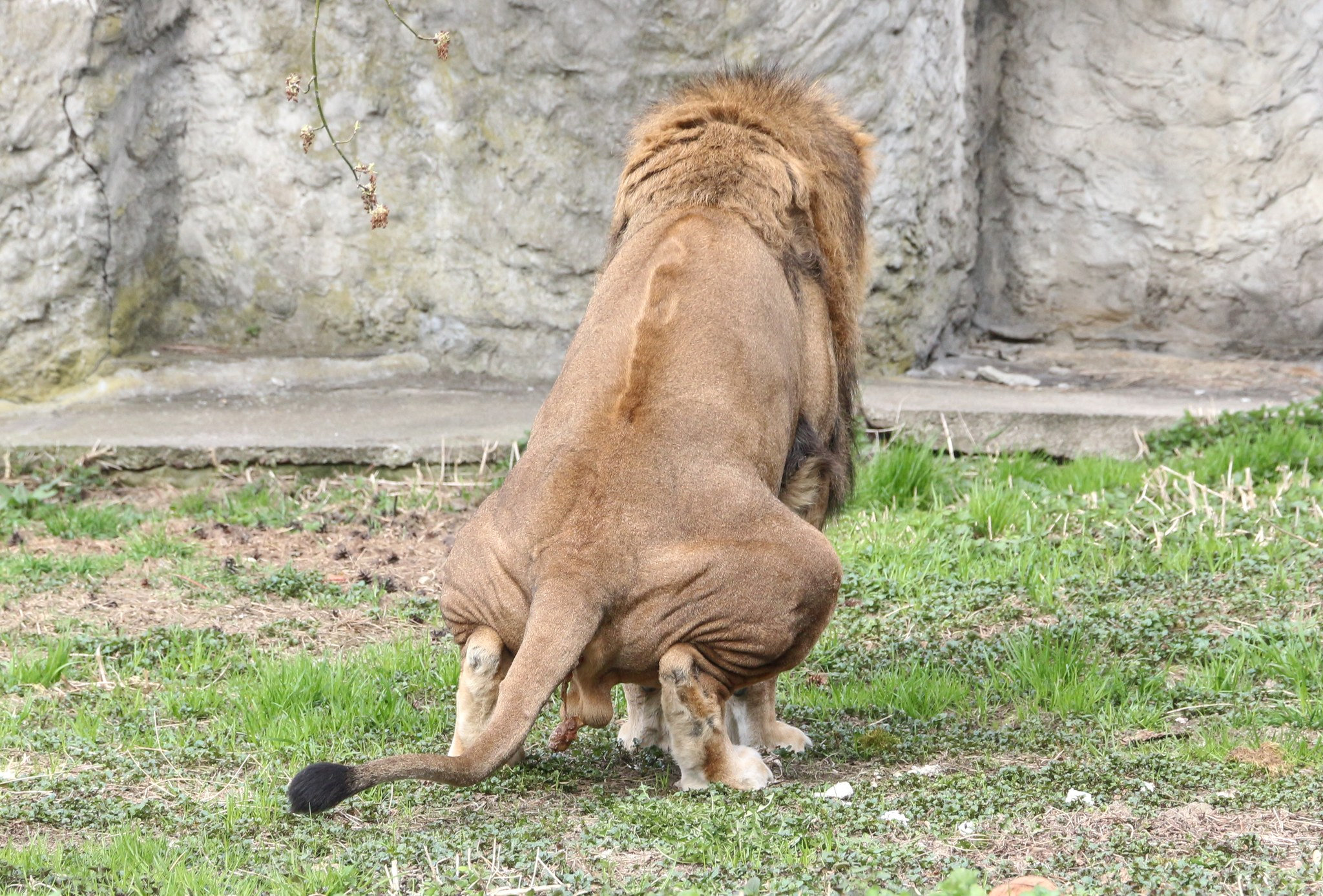
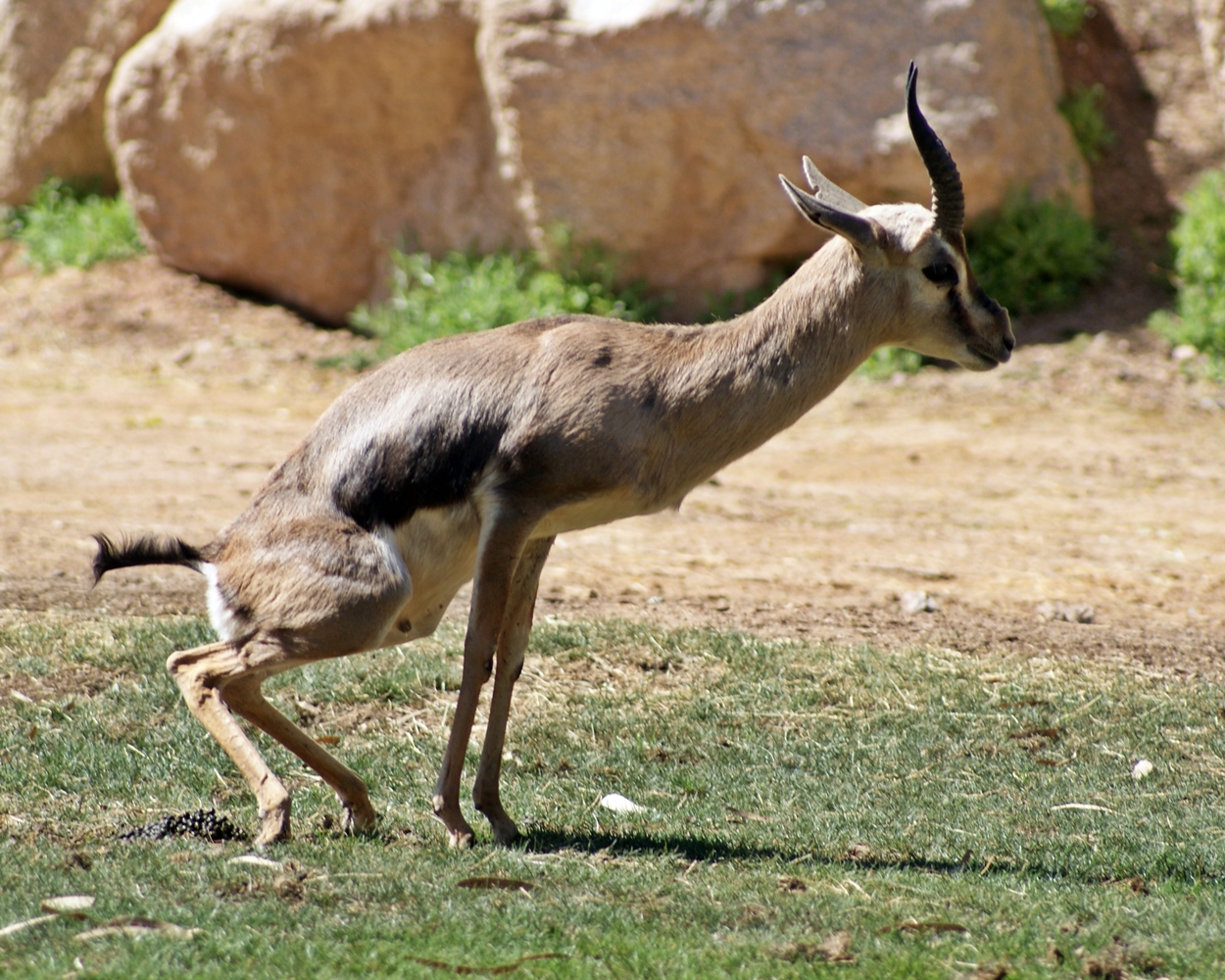
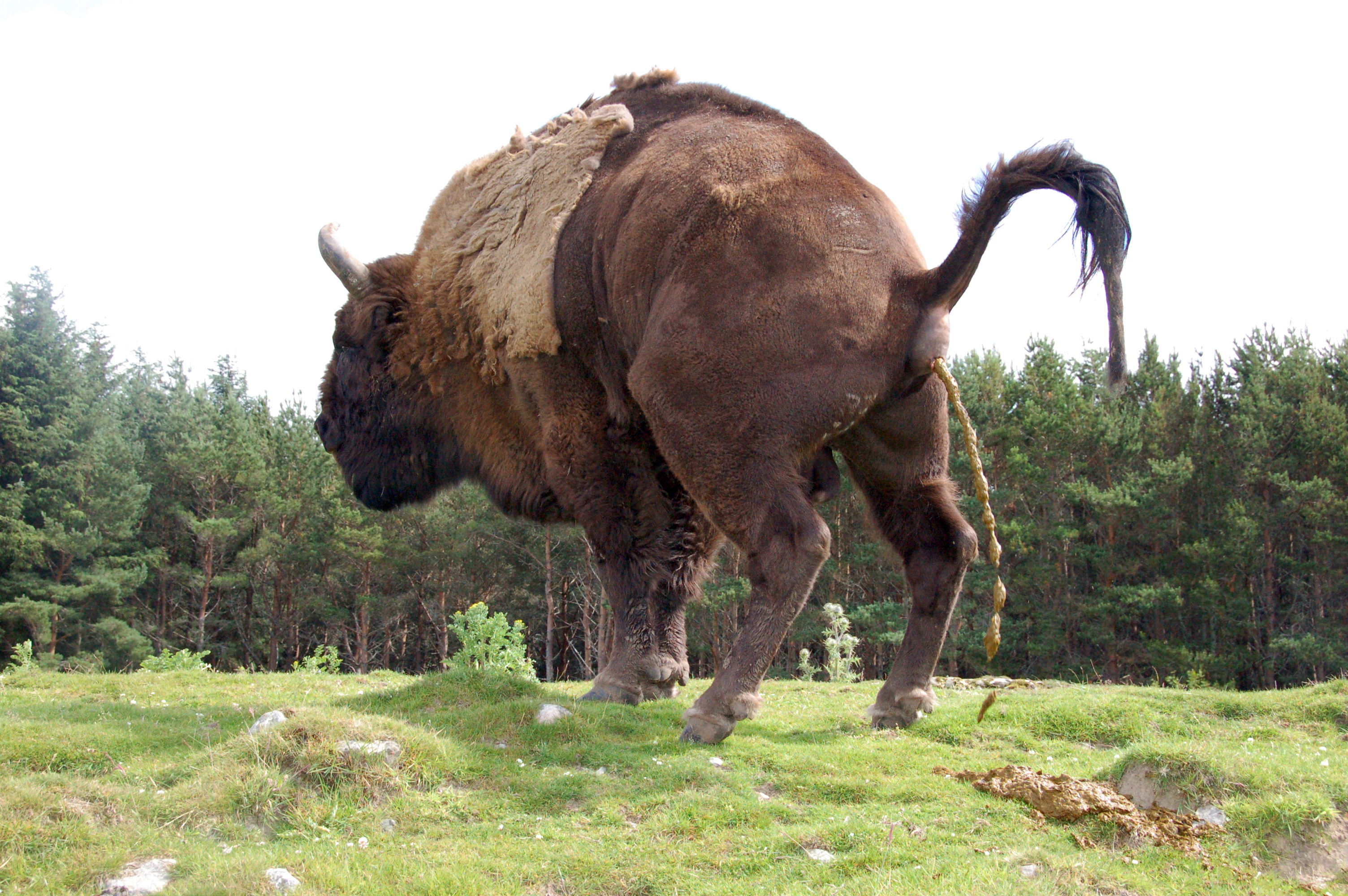
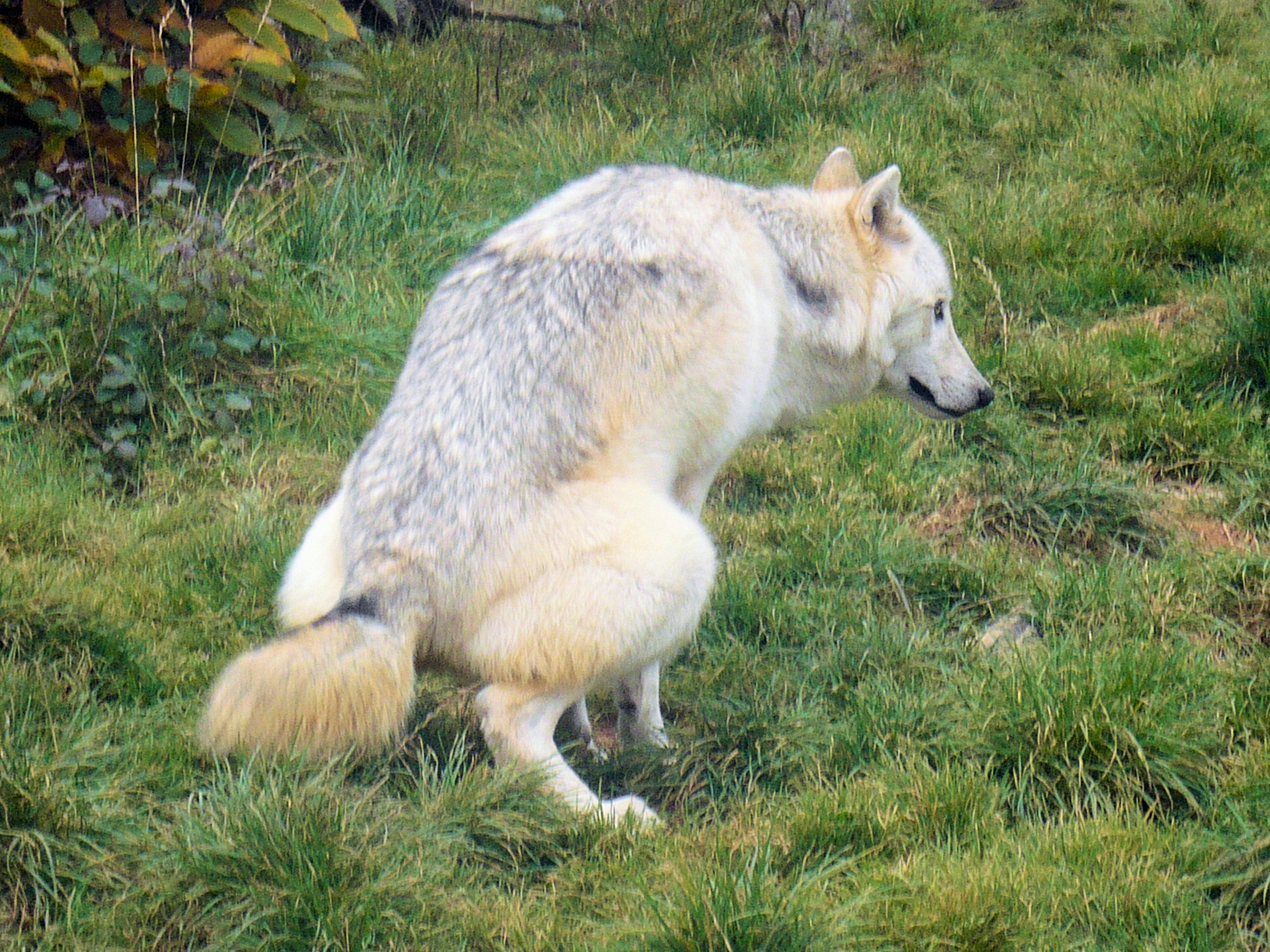
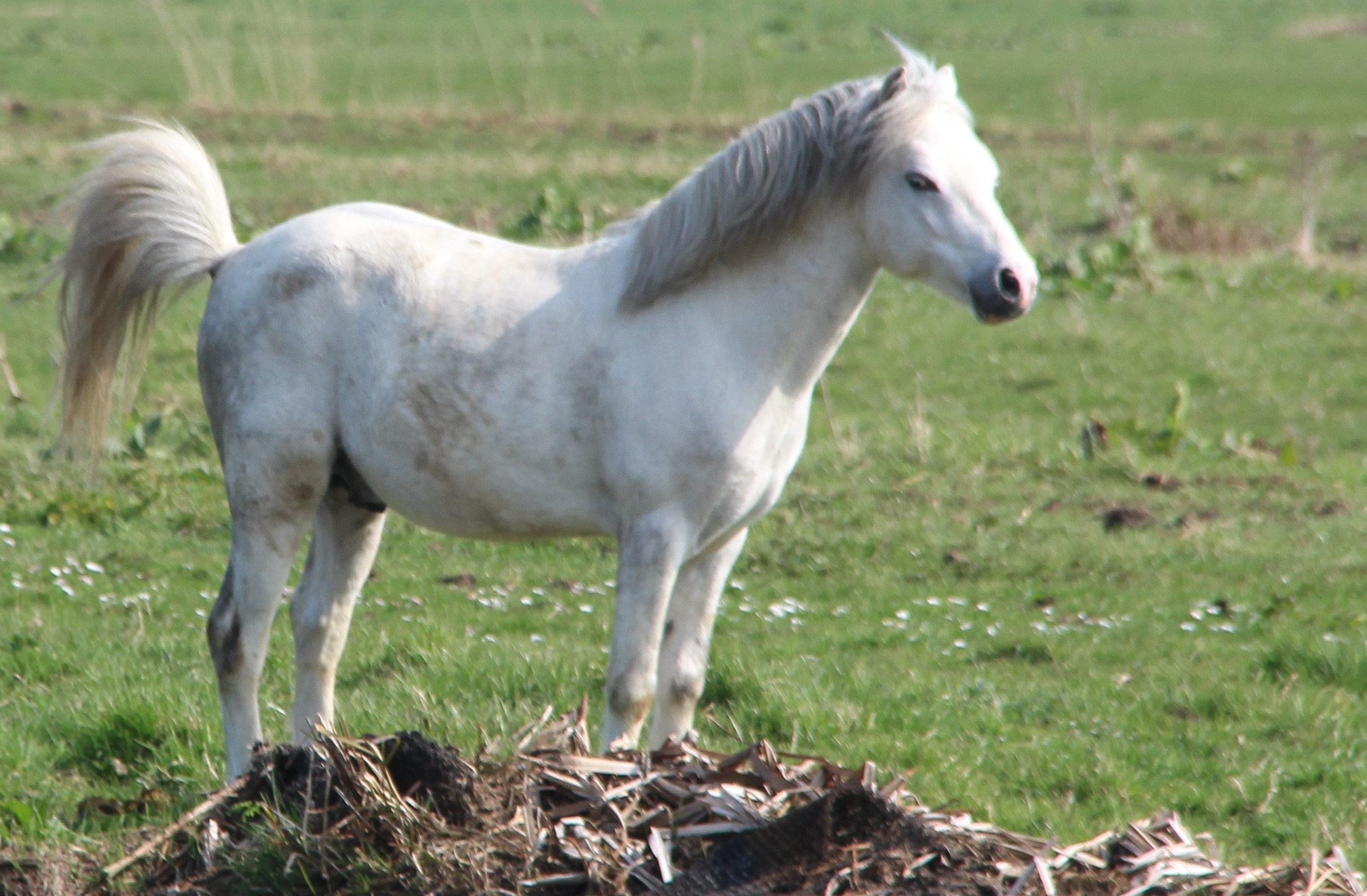
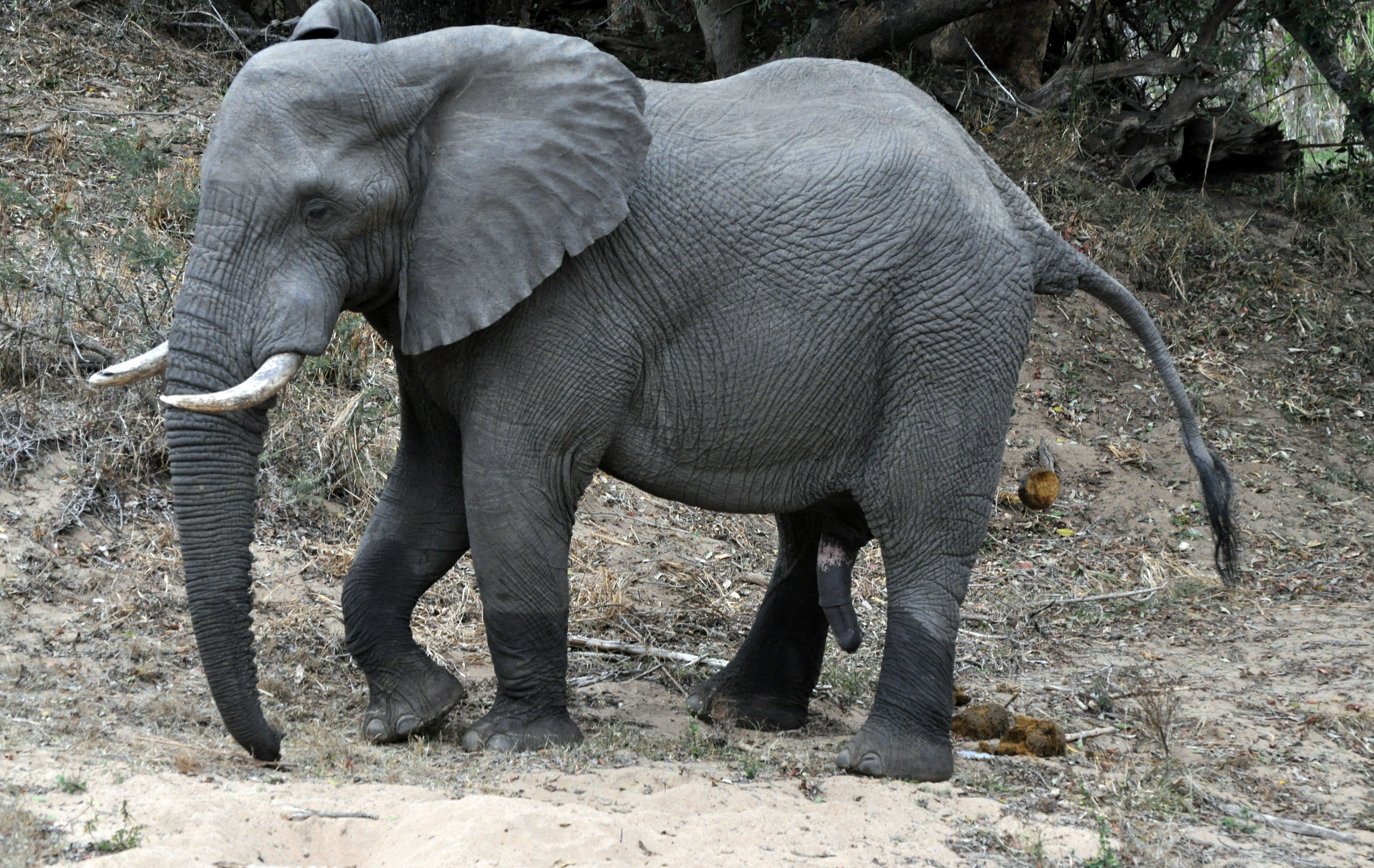
Defecation postures of mammals

Video of a cow defecating

=== Physiology ===
The rectum ampulla stores fecal waste (also called stool) before it is excreted. As the waste fills the rectum and expands the rectal walls, stretch receptors in the rectal walls stimulate the desire to defecate. This urge to defecate arises from the reflex contraction of rectal muscles, relaxation of the internal anal sphincter, and an initial contraction of the skeletal muscle of the external anal sphincter. If the urge is not acted upon, the material in the rectum is often returned to the colon by reverse peristalsis, where more water is absorbed and the feces are stored until the next mass peristaltic movement of the transverse and descending colon.

When the rectum is full, an increase in pressure within the rectum forces apart the walls of the anal canal, allowing the fecal matter to enter the canal. The rectum shortens as material is forced into the anal canal and peristaltic waves push the feces out of the rectum. The internal and external anal sphincters along with the puborectalis muscle allow the feces to be passed by muscles pulling the anus up over the exiting feces.

=== Voluntary and involuntary control ===
The external anal sphincter is under voluntary control whereas the internal anal sphincter is involuntary. In infants, the defecation occurs by reflex action without the voluntary control of the external anal sphincter. Defecation is voluntary in adults. Young children learn voluntary control through the process of toilet training. Once trained, loss of control, called fecal incontinence, may be caused by physical injury, nerve injury, prior surgeries (such as an episiotomy), constipation, diarrhea, loss of storage capacity in the rectum, intense fright, inflammatory bowel disease, psychological or neurological factors, childbirth, or death.

Sometimes, due to the inability to control one's bowel movement or due to excessive fear, defecation (usually accompanied by urination) occurs involuntarily, soiling a person's undergarments. This may cause significant embarrassment to the person if this occurs in the presence of other people or a public place.

=== Posture ===
The positions and modalities of defecation are culture-dependent. Squat toilets are used by the vast majority of the world, including most of Africa, Asia, and the Middle East. The use of sit-down toilets in the Western world is a relatively recent development, beginning in the 19th century with the advent of indoor plumbing.

== Disease ==
Regular bowel movements determine the functionality and the health of the alimentary tracts in human body. Defecation is the most common regular bowel movement which eliminates waste from the human body. The frequency of defecation is hard to identify, which can vary from daily to weekly depending on individual bowel habits, the impact from the environment, and genetics. If defecation is delayed for a prolonged period the fecal matter may harden, resulting in constipation. If defecation occurs too fast, before excess liquid is absorbed, diarrhea may occur. Other associated symptoms can include abdominal bloating, abdominal pain, and abdominal distention. Disorders of the bowel can seriously impact quality of life and daily activities. The causes of functional bowel disorder are multifactorial, and dietary habits such as food intolerance and low fiber diet are considered to be the primary factors.

=== Constipation ===
Constipation, also known as defecatory dysfunction, is difficulty experienced when passing stools. It is one of the most notable alimentary disorders that affects different age groups in the population. Common constipation is associated with abdominal distention, pain or bloating. Research has revealed that chronic constipation complied with higher risk of cardiovascular events such as coronary heart disease and ischemic stroke, while associating with an increasing risk of mortality. Besides dietary factors, psychological traumas and 'pelvic floor disorders' can also cause chronic constipation and defecatory disorder respectively. Multiple interventions, including physical activities, 'high-fibre diet', probiotics and drug therapies can be widely and efficiently used to treat constipation and defecatory disorder.

=== Inflammatory bowel diseases ===
Inflammatory disease is characterized as long-lasting, chronic inflammation throughout the gastrointestinal tract. Crohn's disease (CD) and ulcerative colitis (UC) are two universal types of inflammatory bowel disease that have been studied over a century. They are closely related to different environmental risk factors, family genetics, and lifestyle choices such as smoking. Crohn's disease has been found to be related to immune disorders particularly. Different levels of cumulative intestinal injuries can cause different complications, such as fistulae, damage of bowel function, symptom recurrence, disability, etc. Patients can be children or adults. Recent research shows that immunodeficiency and monogenic disorders are the causes in young patients with inflammatory bowel diseases.

Common symptoms of inflammatory bowel diseases differ by the infection level, but may include severe abdominal pain, diarrhea, fatigue, and unexpected weight loss. Crohn's disease can lead to infection of any part of the digestive tract, including ileum to anus. Internal manifestations include diarrhea, abdomen pain, fever, chronic anaemia, etc. External manifestations include impact on skin, joints, eyes, and liver. Significantly reduced microbiota diversity inside the gastrointestinal tract can also be observed. Ulcerative colitis mainly affects the function of the large bowel, and its incidence rate is three times greater than that of Crohn's disease. In terms of clinical features, over 90 percent of patients exhibit constant diarrhea, rectal bleeding, softer stool, mucus in the stool, tenesmus, and abdominal pain. The symptoms may continue for around 6 weeks or even longer.

The inflammatory bowel diseases could be effectively treated by 'pharmacotherapies' to relieve and maintain the symptoms, which showed in 'mucosal healing' and symptoms elimination. However, an optimal therapy for curing both inflammatory diseases are still under research due to the heterogeneity in clinical feature. Although both UC and CD are sharing similar symptoms, the medical treatment of them are distinctively different. Dietary treatment can benefit for curing CD by increase the dietary zinc and fish intake, which is related to mucosal healing of the bowel. Treatments vary from drug treatment to surgery based on the active level of the CD. UC can also be relieved by using immunosuppressive therapy for mild to moderate disease level and application of biological agents for severe cases.

=== Irritable bowel syndrome ===
Irritable bowel syndrome is diagnosed as an intestinal disorder with chronic abdominal pain and inconsistency in form of stool, and is a common bowel disease that can be easily diagnosed in modern society. The variation in incident rate can be explained by different diagnostic criteria in different countries, with the 18–34 age group being recognized as the high frequency incident group. The definite cause of irritable bowel syndrome remains a mystery; however, it has been found to relate to multiple factors, such as 'alternation of mood and pressure, sleep disorders, food triggers, changing of dysbiosis and even sexual dysfunction'. One third of irritable bowel syndrome patients has family history with the disease suggesting that genetic predisposition could be a significant cause for irritable bowel syndrome.

Patients with irritable bowel syndrome commonly experience abdominal pain, changes to stool form, recurrent abdominal bloating and gas, co-morbid disorders and alternation in bowel habits that caused diarrhea or constipation. However, anxiety and tension can also be detected, although patients with irritable bowel disease seem healthy. Apart from these typical symptoms, rectal bleeding, unexpected weight loss and increased inflammatory markers require further medical examination and investigation.

Treatment for irritable bowel disease is multimodal. Dietary intervention and pharmacotherapies can both relieve the symptoms to a certain degree. Avoiding allergic food groups can be beneficial by reducing fermentation in the digestive tract and gas production, hence effectively alleviating abdominal pain and bloating. Drug interventions, such as laxatives, loperamide, and lubiprostone are applied to relieve intense symptoms including diarrhea, abdominal pain and constipation. Psychological treatment, dietary supplements and gut-focused hypnotherapy are recommended for targeting depression, mood disorders and sleep disturbance.

=== Bowel obstruction ===
Bowel obstruction is a bowel condition which is a blockage that can be found in both the small intestines and large intestines. Increase of contractions can relieve blockages; however, continuous contractions with decreasing functionality may lead to terminated mobility of the small intestines, which then forms the obstruction. At the same time, the lack of contractility encourages liquid and gas accumulation. and "electrolyte disturbances". Small bowel obstruction can result in severe renal damage and hypovolemia. while evolving into "mucosal ischemia and perforation". Patients with small bowel obstruction were found to experience constipation, strangulation and abdominal pain and vomiting. Surgical intervention is primarily used to cure severe small bowel obstruction condition. Nonoperative therapy included nasogastric tube decompression, water-soluble-contrast medium process or symptomatic management can be applied to treat less severe symptoms

According to research, large bowel obstruction is less common than small bowel obstruction, but is still associated with a high mortality rate. Large bowel obstruction, also known as colonic obstruction, includes acute colonic obstruction, where a blockage is formed in the colon. Colonic obstructions frequently occur within the elder population, often accompanied by significant 'comorbidities'. Although colonic malignancy is revealed as the major cause of the colonic obstruction, volvulus has also been founded as a secondary common cause around the world. In addition, lower mobility, unhealthy mentality and restricted living environment are also listed as risk factors. Surgery and colonic stent placements are widely applied for curing colonic obstructions.

=== Other ===
Attempting forced expiration of breath against a closed airway (the Valsalva maneuver) is sometimes practiced to induce defecation while on a toilet. This contraction of expiratory chest muscles, diaphragm, abdominal wall muscles, and pelvic diaphragm exerts pressure on the digestive tract. Ventilation at this point temporarily ceases as the lungs push the chest diaphragm down to exert the pressure. Cardiac arrest and other cardiovascular complications can in rare cases occur due to attempting to defecate using the Valsalva maneuver. Valsalva retinopathy is another pathological syndrome associated with the Valsalva maneuver. Thoracic blood pressure rises and as a reflex response the amount of blood pumped by the heart decreases. Death has been known to occur in cases where defecation causes the blood pressure to rise enough to cause the rupture of an aneurysm or to dislodge blood clots (see thrombosis). Also, in releasing the Valsalva maneuver blood pressure falls; this, coupled with standing up quickly to leave the toilet, can result in a blackout.

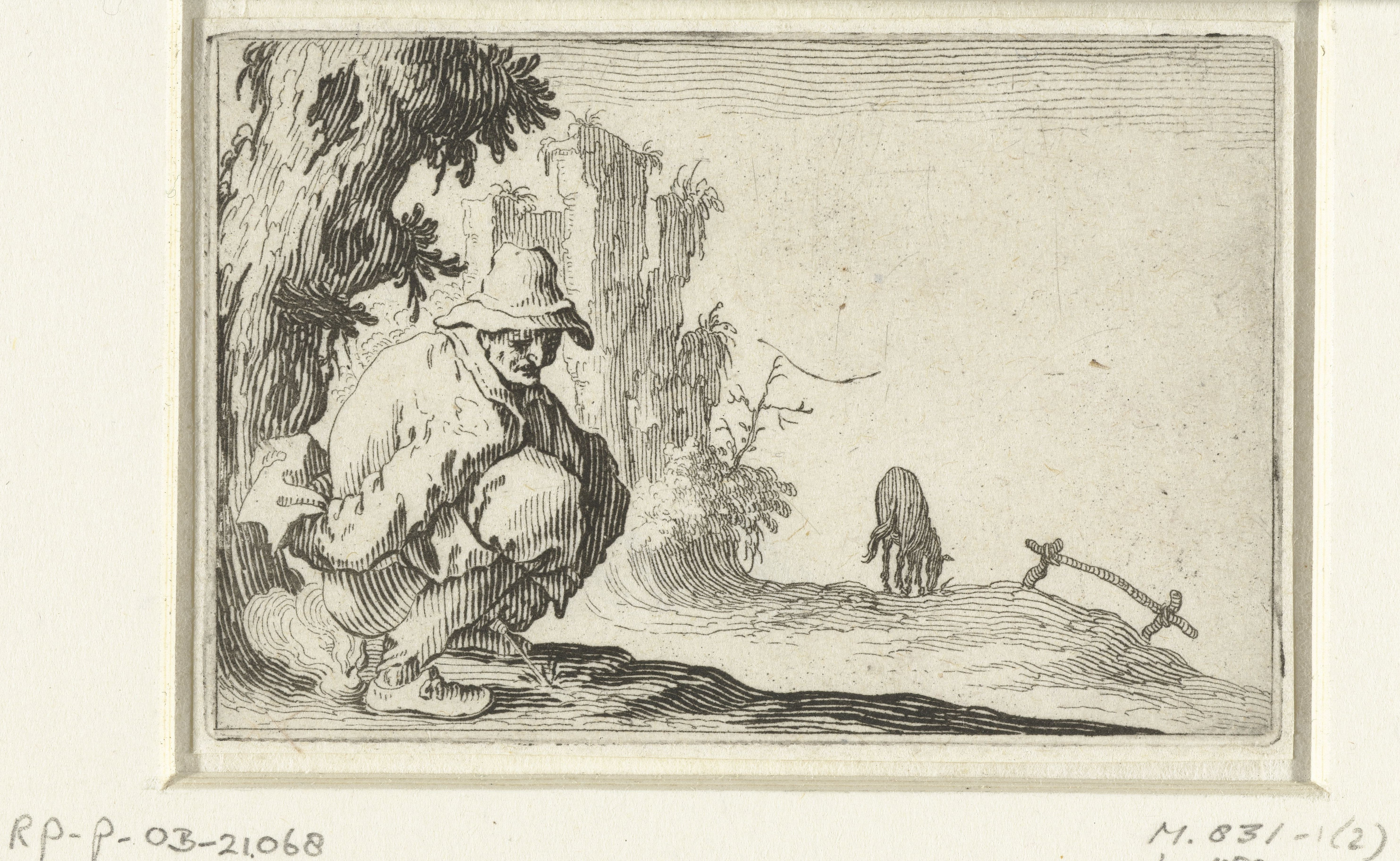
Sketch of a person defecating outside by Jacques Callot (1621)

== Society and culture ==
=== Open defecation ===
Open defecation is the human practice of defecating outside (in the open environment) rather than into a toilet. People may choose fields, bushes, forests, ditches, streets, canals or other open space for defecation. They do so because either they do not have a toilet readily accessible or due to traditional cultural practices. The practice is common where sanitation infrastructure and services are not available. Even if toilets are available, behavior change efforts may still be needed to promote the use of toilets.

Open defecation can pollute the environment and cause health problems. High levels of open defecation are linked to high child mortality, poor nutrition, poverty, and large disparities between rich and poor.

Ending open defecation is an indicator being used to measure progress towards the Sustainable Development Goal Number 6. Extreme poverty and lack of sanitation are statistically linked. Therefore, eliminating open defecation is thought to be an important part of the effort to eliminate poverty.

=== Anal cleansing after defecation ===
The anus and buttocks may be cleansed after defecation with toilet paper, similar paper products, or other absorbent material. In many cultures, such as Hindu and Muslim, water is used for anal cleansing after defecation, either in addition to using toilet paper or exclusively. When water is used for anal cleansing after defecation, toilet paper may be used for drying the area afterwards. Some doctors and people who work in the science and hygiene fields have stated that switching to using a bidet as a form of anal cleansing after defecation is both more hygienic and more environmentally friendly.

=== Mythology and tradition ===
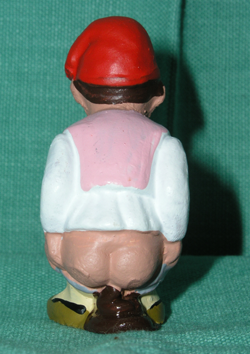
The caganer is a defecating figurine in Spanish nativity scenes.

Some peoples have culturally significant stories in which defecation plays a role. For example:

- In an Alune and Wemale legend from the island of Seram, Maluku Province, Indonesia, the mythical girl Hainuwele defecates valuable objects.
- One of the traditions of Catalonia (Spain) relates to the caganer, a figurine depicting the act of defecation which appears in nativity scenes in Catalonia and neighbouring areas with Catalan culture. The exact origin of the caganer is lost, but the tradition has existed since at least the 18th century.

=== Psychology ===
Some aspects of psychology surround the act of defecation. There is an inherent desire for privacy among humans. Freud stipulated a second stage of development, the Anal Stage, which centers around the release of waste from the bladder and bowels. He categorized two types: anal retentive and anal expulsive.

== See also ==
- Artist's Shit
- Ecological sanitation
- Hemorrhoid
- Human waste
- Improved sanitation
- Rectal tenesmus - a feeling of incomplete defecation
- Reuse of human excreta
- Shit
- Sustainable sanitation
- Urination
