= Psychosexual development =

Freudian psychology

In psychoanalysis, psychosexual development is a central element of the sexual drive theory. According to Sigmund Freud, personality develops through a series of childhood stages in which pleasure-seeking energies from the id become focused on certain erogenous areas. An erogenous zone is characterized as an area of the body that is particularly sensitive to stimulation. The five psychosexual stages are the oral, the anal, the phallic, the latent, and the genital. The erogenous zone associated with each stage serves as a source of pleasure. Being unsatisfied at any particular stage can result in fixation. On the other hand, being satisfied can result in a healthy personality. Sigmund Freud proposed that if the child experienced frustration at any of the psychosexual developmental stages, they would experience anxiety that would persist into adulthood as a neurosis, a functional mental disorder.

== Background ==
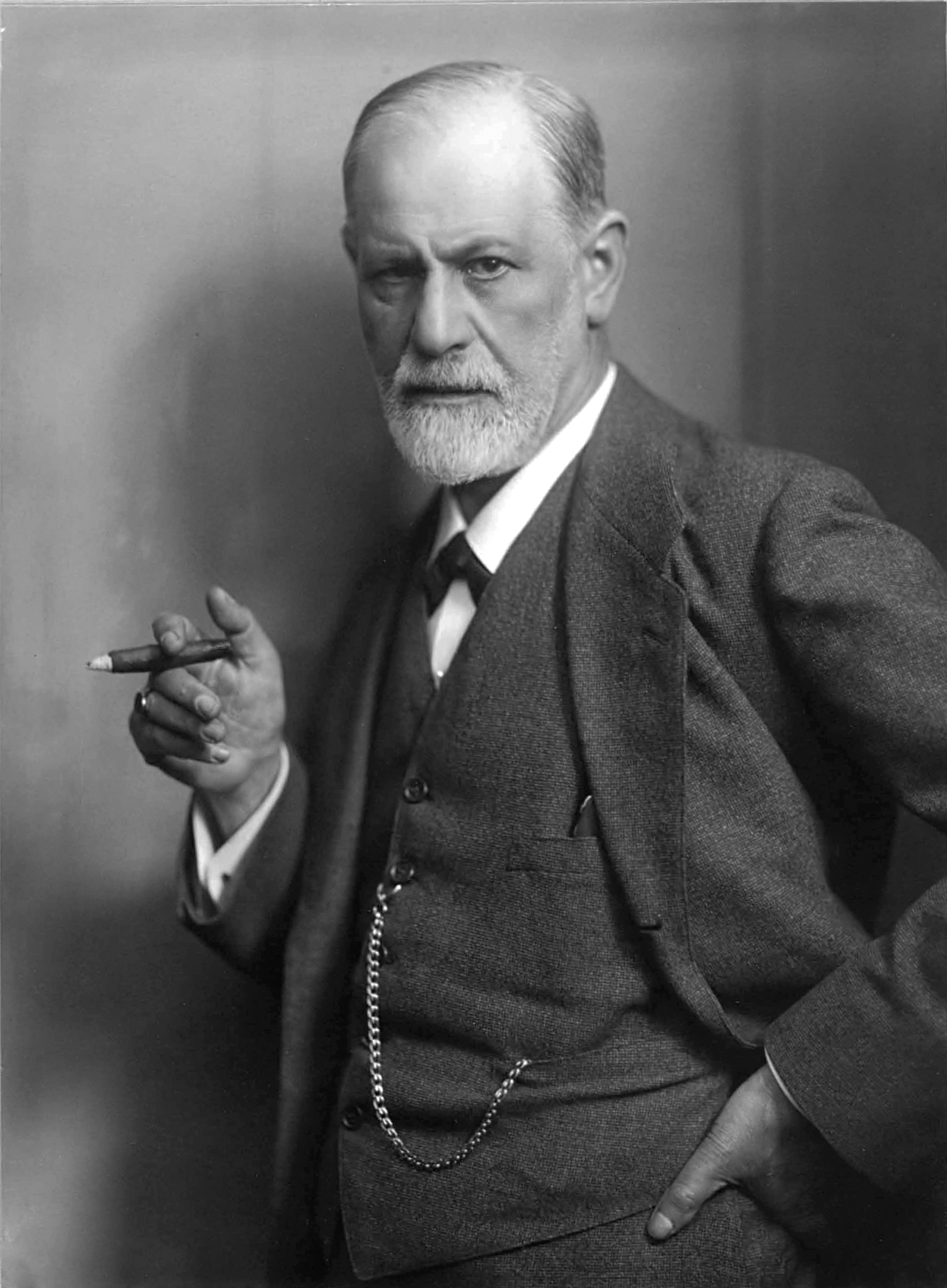
Sigmund Freud, c. 1921

Sigmund Freud (1856–1939) observed that during the predictable stages of early childhood development, as introduced in his major work publication Three Essays on the Theory of Sexuality in 1905, the child's behavior is oriented towards certain parts of their body, for example the mouth during breast-feeding or the anus during toilet-training. In psychoanalysis, the adult neurosis (an outdated term for certain anxiety disorders, functional mental disorder) is thought to be rooted in fixations or conflicts encountered during the developmental stages of childhood sexuality. According to Freud, human beings are born "polymorphous perverse": infants can derive sexual pleasure from any part of their bodies and any object. Over time, the socialization process channels the (originally non-specific) libido into its more fixed mature forms. Given the predictable timeline of childhood behavior, he proposed "libido development" as a model of normal childhood sexual development, wherein the child progresses through five psychosexual stages – the oral; the anal; the phallic; the latency; and the genital – in which the source pleasure is in a different erogenous zone.

== Freudian psychosexual development ==
Sexual infantilism: in pursuing and satisfying their libido (sexual drive), the child might experience failure (parental and societal disapproval) and thus might associate anxiety with the given erogenous zone. To avoid anxiety, the child becomes fixated, preoccupied with the psychological themes related to the erogenous zone in question. The fixation persists into adulthood and underlies the personality and psychopathology of the individual. It may manifest as mental ailments such as neurosis, hysteria, "female hysteria", or personality disorder.

Stage	Age Range	Erogenous zone	Consequences of psychological fixation
Oral	Birth–1 year	Mouth	Orally aggressive: chewing gum and the ends of pencils, etc. Orally passive: smoking, eating, kissing, oral sexual practices Oral stage fixation might result in a passive, gullible, immature, manipulative personality.
Anal	1–3 years	Bowel (the primary erogenous zone for anal stage is the anus)	Anal retentive: Obsessively organized, or excessively neat Anal expulsive: reckless, careless, defiant, disorganized, coprophiliac
Phallic	3–6 years	Genitalia	Oedipus complex (in boys and girls) (for boys only); according to Sigmund Freud. Electra complex (in girls); according to Carl Jung. Promiscuity and low self-esteem in both sexes.
Latency	6–puberty (12 years)	Dormant sexual feelings	Immaturity and an inability to form fulfilling non-sexual relationships as an adult if fixation occurs in this stage.
Genital	Puberty–death (continues through adulthood)	Sexual interests mature	Frigidity, impotence, sexual perversion, great difficulty in forming a healthy sexual relationship with another person

=== Id, ego, and superego ===
Agency	Description	Functions	Principles and Development
Id	The most primitive part of the mind, it contains instinctual drives and is the source of psychic energy.	Seeks immediate gratification of all desires, wants, and needs.	Operates according to the pleasure principle, which aims to reduce tension, avoid pain, and gain pleasure. Present from birth and is the reservoir of the libido.
Ego	The part of the id that has been modified by the direct influence of the external world.	Regulates the drives of the id to suit the demands of reality.	Governed by the reality principle, it seeks to please the id's drive in realistic ways that will benefit in the long term. Emerges from the id and is responsible for reality testing and a sense of personal identity.
Superego	The part of the personality that represents the internalization of parental and societal values.	Upholds societal standards, imposes moral behavior, and mediates between the id and ego.	Guided by moralistic and idealistic principles, it strives for perfection over mere pleasure or reality. Forms during the resolution of the Oedipus complex and represents the internalized ideals of parents and society.

=== Oral stage ===
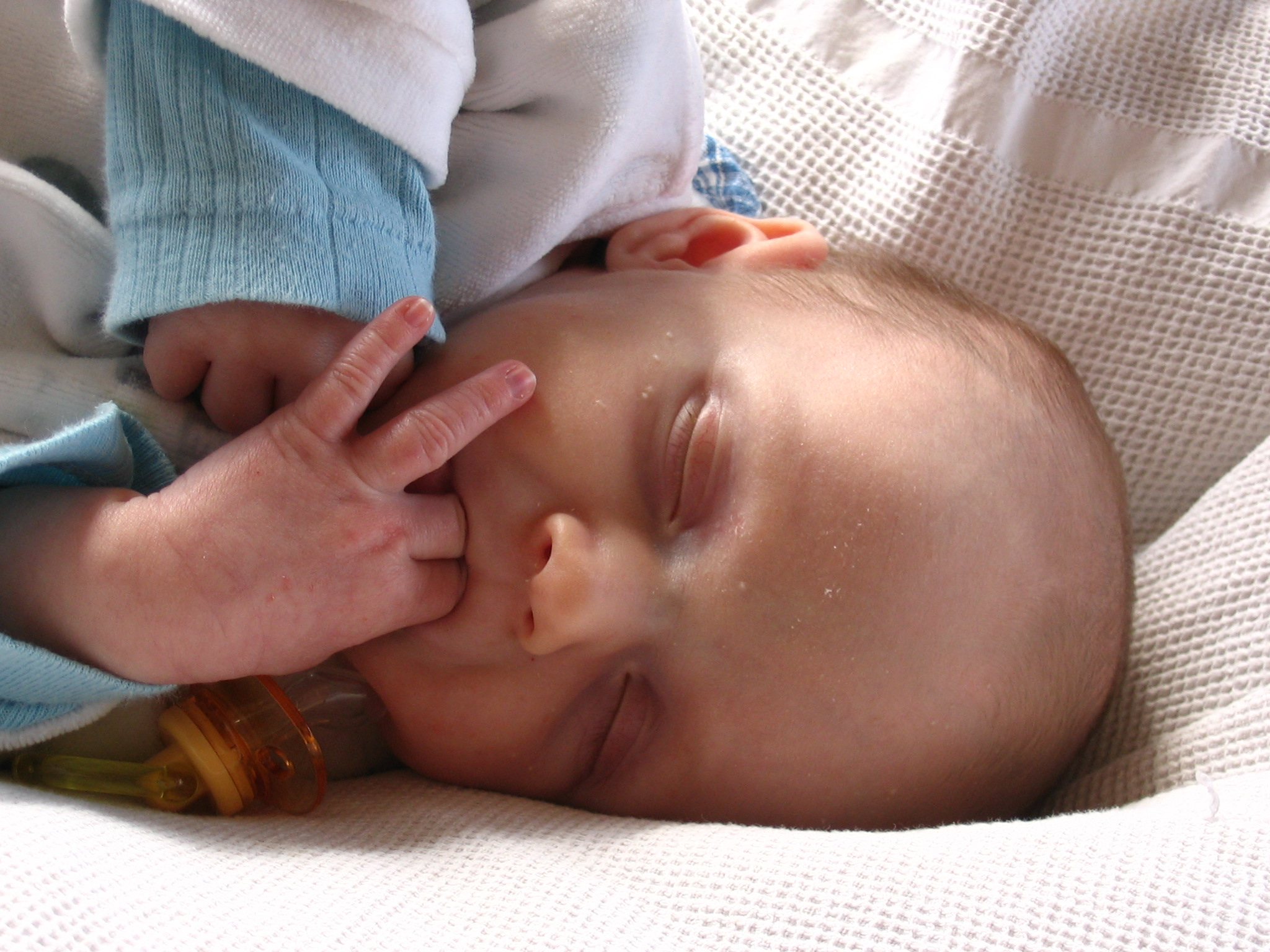
Oral needs may be satisfied by thumb-sucking.

The first stage of psychosexual development is the oral stage, spanning from birth until the age of one year, where in the infant's mouth is the focus of libidinal gratification derived from the pleasure of feeding at the mother's breast, and from the oral exploration of their environment, i.e. the tendency to place objects in the mouth. The child focuses on nursing, with the intrinsic pleasure of sucking and accepting things into the mouth. Since the ego is not developed beyond the most rudimentary form at this stage (in the oral stage, the id is fully present, the ego begins to emerge and the super ego is not yet developed), every action is based upon the pleasure principle of the id. Nonetheless, the infantile ego is in the process of forming during the oral stage. In developing a body image, infants are aware of themselves as discrete from the external world; for example, the child understands pain when it is applied to their body, thus identifying the physical boundaries between body and environment. The experience of delayed gratification leads to understanding that specific behaviors satisfy some needs; for example, crying gratifies certain needs.

Weaning is the key experience in the infant's oral stage of psychosexual development, their first feeling of loss consequent to losing the physical intimacy of feeding at their mother's breast. The child is not only deprived of the sensory pleasures of nursing but also of the psychological pleasure of being cared for, mothered, and held. However, weaning increases the infant's self-awareness, through learning that they do not control their environment. The experience of delayed gratification leads to the formation of capacities for independence (awareness of the limits of the self) and trust (behaviors leading to gratification). Thwarting of the oral-stage – too much or too little gratification of desire – might lead to an oral-stage fixation, which can be the root of neurotic tendencies in the developed personality. In the case of too much gratification, the child does not adequately learn that they do not control the environment, and that gratification is not always immediate, thereby forming an immature personality. In the case of too little gratification, the infant might become passive upon learning that gratification is not forthcoming, despite having produced the gratifying behavior.

=== Anal stage ===
The second stage of psychosexual development is the anal stage, spanning from the age of eighteen months (one year) to three years, wherein the infant's erogenous zone changes from the mouth (the upper digestive tract) to the anus (the lower digestive tract), while ego formation continues. Toilet training is the child's key anal-stage experience, occurring at about the age of two years. It involves conflict between the id (demanding immediate gratification) and the ego (demanding delayed gratification) in eliminating bodily wastes, and handling related activities (e.g. manipulating excrement, coping with parental demands). The child may respond with defiance, resulting in an "anal expulsive character"—often messy, reckless, and defiant—or with retention, leading to an "anal retentive character"—typically neat, precise, and passive-aggressive. The style of parenting influences the resolution of the conflict, which can be either gradual and psychologically uneventful, or which can be sudden and psychologically traumatic.

The ideal resolution of the conflict is that the child adjusts to moderate parental demands that teach the value and importance of physical cleanliness and environmental order, thus producing a self-controlled adult. The outcome of this stage can permanently affect the individual's propensities toward possession and attitudes toward authority. If the parents make immoderate demands of the child, by too strictly enforcing toilet training, it might lead to the development of a compulsive personality, a person too concerned with neatness and order. If the parents consistently allow the child to indulge the impulse, the child might develop a self-indulgent personality characterized by personal slovenliness and environmental disorder.

=== Phallic stage ===
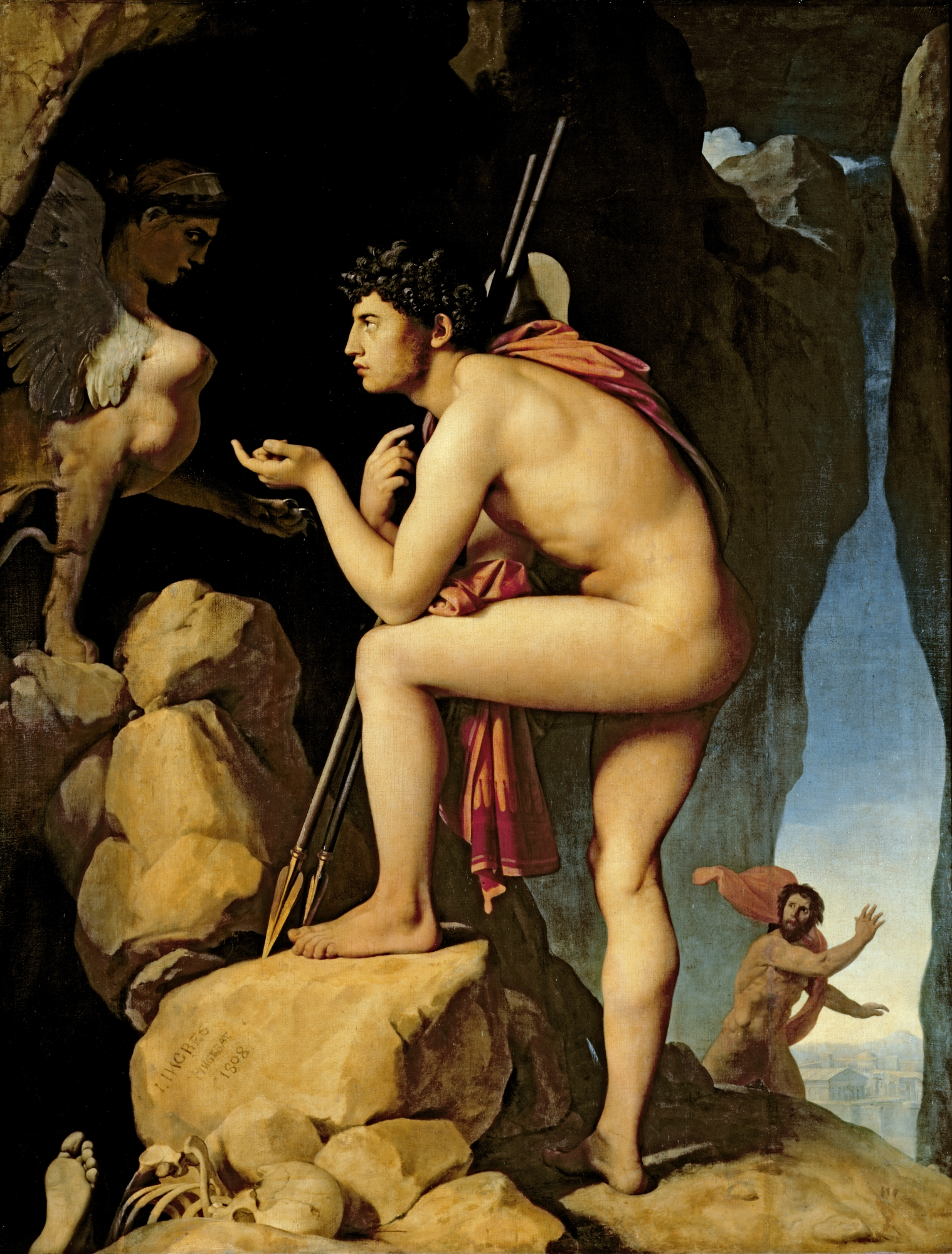
Oedipus explains the riddle of the Sphinx, Jean Auguste Dominique Ingres (c. 1805)

The third stage of psychosexual development is the phallic stage, spanning the ages of three to six years, where in the child's genitalia are their primary erogenous zone. It is in this third infantile development stage that children become aware of their bodies, the bodies of other children, and the bodies of their parents; they gratify physical curiosity by undressing and exploring each other as well as their genitals, and so learn the physical (sexual) differences between male and female and their associated social roles. In the phallic stage, a boy's decisive psychosexual experience is the Oedipus complex—his son–father competition for possession of his mother. The name derives from the 5th-century BC Greek mythological character Oedipus, who unwittingly killed his father and sexually possessed his mother. In the young male, the Oedipus conflict stems from his natural love for his mother, a love which becomes sexual as his libidinal energy transfers from the anal region to the genital. The boy observes that his father stands in the way of his love and desire for possession of his mother. He therefore feels aggression and envy towards his father, but also a fear that his (much stronger) rival will strike back at him. As the boy has noticed that women, his mother in particular, have no penises, he is particularly struck by the fear that his father will remove his penis too. This castration anxiety surpasses his desire for his mother, so the desire is repressed. Although the boy sees that he cannot possess his mother, he reasons that he can possess her vicariously by identifying with his father and becoming as much like him as possible: this identification is the primary experience guiding the boy's entry into his appropriate sexual role in life. A lasting trace of the Oedipal conflict is the superego, the voice of the father within the boy. By thus resolving his incestuous conundrum, (a concept used by Freud to refer to the emotional struggle a child experiences during the Oedipus complex) the boy passes into the latency period, a period of libidinal dormancy.

Initially, Freud applied the theory of the Oedipus complex to the psychosexual development of boys, but later developed the female aspects of the theory as the feminine Oedipus attitude and the negative Oedipus complex. The feminine Oedipus complex has its roots in the little girl's discovery that she, along with her mother and all other women, lack the penis which her father and other men possess. Her love for her father then becomes both erotic and envious, as she yearns for a penis of her own. She comes to blame her mother for her perceived castration, and is struck by penis envy, the apparent counterpart to the boy's castration anxiety.

Freud's student–collaborator, Carl Jung, coined the term Electra complex in 1913. The name derives from the 5th-century BC Greek mythological character Electra, who plotted matricidal revenge with her brother Orestes, against their mother and stepfather, for the murder of their father. (cf. Electra, by Sophocles). According to Jung, a girl's decisive psychosexual experience is her daughter–mother competition for psychosexual possession of her father. Freud rejected Jung's term as psychoanalytically inaccurate: "that what we have said about the Oedipus complex applies with complete strictness to the male child only, and that we are right in rejecting the term 'Electra complex', which seeks to emphasize the analogy between the attitude of the two sexes".

The resolution of the feminine Oedipus complex is less clear-cut than the resolution of the Oedipus complex in males. Freud stated that the resolution comes much later and is never truly complete. Just as the boy learned his sexual role by identifying with his father, so the girl learns her role by identifying with her mother in an attempt to possess her father vicariously. At the eventual resolution of the conflict, the girl passes into the latency period, though Freud implies that she always remains slightly fixated at the phallic stage.

Despite the mother being the parent who primarily gratifies the child's desires, the child begins forming a discrete sexual identity – "boy", "girl" – that alters the dynamics of the parent and child relationship; the parents become the focus of infantile libidinal energy. The boy focuses his libido (sexual desire) upon his mother, and focuses jealousy and emotional rivalry against his father – because it is he who sleeps with the mother. Seeking to be united with his mother, the boy desires the death of his father, but the ego, pragmatically based upon the reality principle, knows that the father is the stronger of the two males competing to possess the one female. Nevertheless, the boy remains ambivalent about his father's place in the family, which is manifested as fear of castration by the physically greater father; the fear is an irrational, subconscious manifestation of the infantile Id. 'Penis envy' in the girl is rooted in feeling "inferior" to the opposite sex. As a result, the girl redirects her desire for sexual union toward the father; thus, she progresses towards heterosexual femininity that ideally culminates in bearing a child who replaces the absent penis. After the phallic stage, the girl's psychosexual development includes transferring her primary erogenous zone from the infantile clitoris to the adult vagina. Freud considered a girl's Oedipal conflict to be more emotionally intense than that of a boy, potentially resulting in a submissive woman of an insecure personality.

In both sexes, defense mechanisms provide transitory resolutions of the conflict between the drives of the Id and the drives of the ego. The first defense mechanism is repression, the blocking of anxiety-inducing impulses and ideas from the conscious mind. The second defense mechanism is Identification, by which the child incorporates, to their ego, the personality characteristics of the same-sex parent. The boy thus diminishes his castration anxiety, because his identification with the father reduces the rivalry and suggests the promise of a future potency. The girl identifies with the mother, who understands that, in being females, neither of them possesses a penis, and thus they are not antagonists.

=== Latency stage ===
The fourth stage of psychosexual development is the latency stage (from the age of 6 until puberty), wherein the child consolidates the character habits they developed in the three earlier stages. Whether or not the child has successfully resolved the Oedipal conflict, the instinctual drives of the child are inaccessible to the ego, because they have been subject to the mechanism of repression during the phallic stage. Hence, because the drives are latent (hidden) and gratification is indefinitely delayed, the child must derive the pleasure of gratification from secondary process-thinking that directs the energy of the drives towards external activities, such as schooling, friendships, hobbies, etc. Any neuroses established during the latent stage of psychosexual development might derive from the inadequate resolution of the Oedipus conflict, or from the ego's failure in attempts to direct the energies towards socially acceptable activities.

Modern perspectives on the latency stage focus on children's social development; for instance, Ruth Ludlam describes the perception of social hierarchy and the application and reception of cruelty as occupying the "entire space" of children's psychic existence during this stage.

=== Genital stage ===
The fifth stage of psychosexual development is the genital stage (from puberty through adult life) and usually represents the greater part of a person's life. Its aim is the psychological detachment and independence from the parents. In the genital stage, the person confronts and seeks to resolve their remaining psychosexual childhood conflicts. As in the phallic stage, the genital stage is centered upon the genitalia, but the sexuality is consensual and adult, rather than solitary and infantile. The psychological difference between the phallic and genital stages is that the ego is established in the latter; the person's concern shifts from primary-drive gratification (instinct) to applying secondary process-thinking to gratify desire symbolically and intellectually by means of friendships, a love relationship, family and adult responsibility.

== Criticisms ==
=== Scientific ===
The theory is widely considered unscientific due to lack of empirical rigor and non-predictive theories based on a small number of people. It often does not align with modern biological science. Historically, Freud's theory was pioneering in its highlighting of the importance of childhood, and influenced attachment theory (which is also criticized as non-factual), psychodynamic psychotherapy, and developmental psychology generally.

According to Frank Cioffi, a criticism of the scientific validity of the psychoanalytical theory of human psychosexual development is that Freud was personally fixated upon human sexuality.

Freud stated that his patients commonly had memories and fantasies of childhood seduction. According to Frederick Crews, critics hold that these were more likely to have been constructs that Freud created and forced upon his patients.

=== Feminist ===
Some feminists criticize Freud's psychosexual development theory as being sexist and phallocentric, arguing that it was overly informed by his own self-analysis. In response to the Freudian concept of penis envy in the development of the feminine Oedipus complex, the German Neo-Freudian psychoanalyst Karen Horney, counter-proposed that girls instead develop "power envy" rather than penis envy. She also proposed the concept of "womb and vagina envy", the male's envy of the female ability to bear children. Some contemporary theorists suggest, in addition to this, the envy of the woman's perceived right to be the kind parent.

=== Anthropological ===
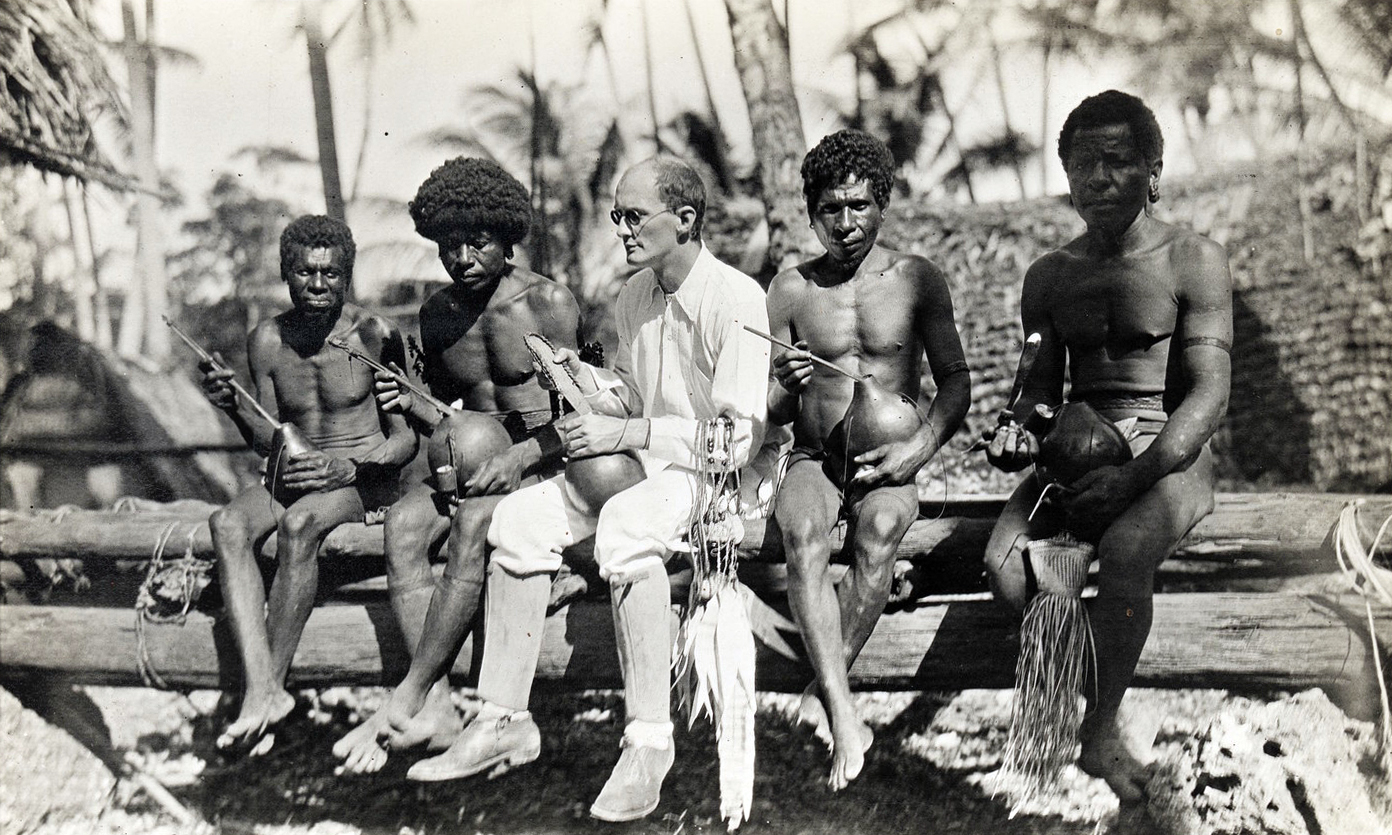
Bronisław Malinowski and natives, Trobriand Islands (1918)

Contemporary cultural considerations have questioned the normative presumptions of the Freudian psychodynamic perspective that posits the son–father conflict of the Oedipal complex as universal and essential to human psychological development.

The anthropologist Bronisław Malinowski's studies of the Trobriand islanders challenged the Freudian proposal that psychosexual development (e.g. the Oedipus complex) was universal. He reported that in the insular matriarchal society of the Trobriand, boys are disciplined by their maternal uncles, not their fathers (impartial, avuncular discipline). In Sex and Repression in Savage Society (1927), Malinowski reported that boys dreamed of feared uncles, not of beloved fathers, thus, power – not sexual jealousy – is the source of Oedipal conflict in such non–Western societies. Furthermore, contemporary research confirms that although personality traits corresponding to the oral stage, the anal stage, the phallic stage, the latent stage, and the genital stage are observable, they remain undetermined as fixed stages of childhood, and as adult personality traits derived from childhood.

== See also ==
- Amphimixis
- Herma
- Min (god)
- Fertility
- Bacchanalia
- Vanir
- Phallic monism
- Priapus
- Sigmund Freud
- Orgastic potency
