= Genital stage =

Freudian psychosexual development

The genital stage in psychoanalysis is the term used by Sigmund Freud to describe the final stage of human psychosexual development. The individual develops a strong sexual interest in people outside of the family. The genital stage is the fifth of the five Freudian psychosexual development stages: the oral, the anal, the phallic, the latent, and the genital.

== In Freud and later thinkers ==
The notion of the genital stage was added to the Three Essays on the Theory of Sexuality (1905) by Sigmund Freud in 1915. This stage begins around the time that puberty starts and ends at death. According to Freud, this stage reappears along with the Oedipus complex. The genital stage is similar to the phallic stage, in that its main concern is the genitalia; however, this concern is now conscious.

The genital stage appears when the sexual and aggressive drives have returned. The source of sexual pleasure expands outside of the mother and father. If during the phallic stage, the child was unconsciously attracted to the same-sex parent, then homosexual relationships can occur during this stage. However, this interpretation of the phallic stage is incongruous with what the phallic stage is primarily understood to entail from the following viewpoint. The Oedipus complex, which is one of the most significant components of the phallic stage, can be explained as the need to have the utmost response from the parental figure, that is, the main object of the libido. It must be clarified that it is more often the mother who is giving the gratification in response to a discharge and or manifestation of libido and is therefore the object of the infantile libido—not the father. It is less likely that the subject will have any unconscious sexual attraction to the father because the father is the source of the subject's incapability to possess the mother: the subject is still focused on receiving attention from the mother. Furthermore, all sexual attraction during the phallic stage is purely unconscious.

During the genital stage, the ego and superego have become more developed. This allows the individual to have more realistic ways of thinking and establish an assortment of social relations apart from the family. The genital stage is the latest stage and is considered the highest level of maturity. In this stage, the adult becomes capable of the two signs of maturation: work and love.

The stage is initiated at puberty, but may not be completed until well into the adult years. Otto Fenichel considered genital primacy was the precondition for overcoming ambivalence and for whole-object love.

In 1960, Robert W. White extended Freud's genital stage to not only include instinctual needs but also effectance. His stage extension included one beginning to decide what role one will play in society and dating for social and sexual satisfaction.

== Prognoses ==
The degree to which an individual has reached the genital level was seen by Freudians as inversely correlated with susceptibility to neurosis; conversely, fixation on earlier psychosexual levels will hamper the development of normal sexual relationships.

Although oral, anal, and genital are all distinct stages they can occur simultaneously and indefinitely. Freud argued that an individual could become stuck in any of these stages if overindulgence or underindulgence occurs. If the adult did not successfully complete a stage, fixation may occur later in life.

== Criticism ==
While the normal genital character was theoretically recognised as an ideal construct, in practice the concept of the genital level could be fetishized into an addictive goal or commodity, not an experiential reality.

Jacques Lacan wrote of "this absurd hymn to the harmony of the genital" in vulgar Freudianism.

== See also ==
- Jeffrey Moussaieff Masson
- Life Against Death
- Regression
- Vaginal versus clitoral orgasms
- Wilhelm Reich
