= Penis envy =

One of Sigmund Freud's psychoanalytic concepts

Penis envy (German: Penisneid) is a stage in Sigmund Freud's theory of female psychosexual development, in which young girls experience anxiety upon realization that they do not have a penis. Freud considered this realization a defining moment in a series of transitions toward a mature female sexuality. In Freudian theory, the penis envy stage begins the transition from attachment to the mother to competition with the mother for the attention and affection of the father. The young boy's realization that women do not have a penis is thought to result in castration anxiety.

Freud's theory on penis envy was criticized and debated by other psychoanalysts, such as Karen Horney, Ernest Jones, Helene Deutsch, and Melanie Klein, specifically on the treatment of penis envy as a fixed operation as opposed to a formation constructed or used in a secondary manner to fend off earlier wishes.

== Freud's theory ==
Freud introduced the concept of interest and envy of the penis in his 1908 article "On the Sexual Theories of Children." It was not mentioned in the first edition of Freud's earlier Three Contributions to the Theory of Sex (1905), but a synopsis of the 1908 article was added to the third edition in 1915. In On Narcissism (1914) he described how some women develop a masculine ideal as "a survival of the boyish nature that they themselves once possessed". The term grew in significance as Freud gradually refined his views of sexuality, coming to describe a mental process he believed occurred as one went from the phallic stage to the latency stage (see Psychosexual development.)

=== Psychosexual development ===
==== Child ====
Penis envy stems from Freud's concept of the Oedipus complex in which the phallic conflict arises for males, as well as for females. Though Carl Jung made the distinction between the Oedipus complex for males and the Electra complex for females in his work The Theory of Psychoanalysis, Freud rejected this latter term, stating that the feminine Oedipus complex is not the same as the male Oedipus because, "It is only in the male child that we find the fateful combination of love for the one parent and simultaneous hatred of the other as a rival." This development of the female Oedipus complex according to Freud begins when the female makes comparisons with another male, perceiving this not as a sex characteristic; but rather, by assuming that she had previously possessed a penis, and had lost it by castration. This leads to the essential difference between the male and female Oedipus complex that the female accepts castration as a fact, while the boy fears it happening.

Freud felt that penis envy may lead to:

- Resentment towards the mother, who failed to provide the daughter with a penis
- Depreciation of the mother, who appears to be castrated
- Giving up on phallic activity (clitoral masturbation) and adopting passivity (vaginal intercourse)
- A symbolic equivalence between penis and child

This envy towards the penis leads to various psychical consequences according to Freud, so long as it does not form into a reaction-formation of a masculinity complex. One such consequence is a sense of inferiority after becoming aware of the wound inflicted upon her narcissism. After initially attempting to explain this lack of a penis as a punishment towards her, she later realizes the universality of her female situation, and as a result begins to share the contempt that men have towards women as a lesser (in the important respect of a lack of a penis), and so insists upon being like a man. A second consequence of penis envy involves the formation of the character-trait of jealousy through displacement of the abandoned penis envy upon maturation. Freud concludes this from considering the common female fantasy of a child being beaten to be a confession of masturbation, with the child representing the clitoris. A third consequence of penis envy involves the discovery of the inferiority of this clitoris, suggested through the observation that masturbation is further removed from females than from males. This is, according to Freud, because clitoral masturbation is a masculine activity that is slowly repressed throughout puberty (and shortly after discovering the penis envy) in an attempt to make room for the female's femininity by transitioning the erotogenic zone from the clitoris to the vagina.

The result of these anxieties culminates in the girl giving up on her desire for the penis, and instead puts it in the place of the wish for a child; and, with that goal in mind, she takes her father as the love-object and makes the mother into the object of her jealousy.

==== Adult ====
Freud considered that in normal female development penis envy transformed into the wish for a man and/or a baby.

Karl Abraham differentiated two types of adult women in whom penis envy remained intense as the wish-fulfilling and the vindictive types: The former were dominated by fantasies of having or becoming a penis—as with the singing/dancing/performing women who felt that in their acts they magically incorporated the (parental) phallus. The latter sought revenge on the male through humiliation or deprivation (whether by removing the man from the penis or the penis from the man).

== Society and culture ==
=== Within psychoanalytic circles ===
Freud's theories regarding psychosexual development, and in particular the phallic stage, were challenged early by other psychoanalysts, such as Karen Horney, Otto Fenichel and Ernest Jones, though Freud did not accept their view of penis envy as a secondary, rather than a primary, female reaction. Later psychologists, such as Erik Erikson and Jean Piaget, challenged the Freudian model of child psychological development as a whole.

Jacques Lacan, however, took up and developed Freud's theory of the importance of what he called "penisneid in the unconscious of women" in linguistic terms, seeing what he called the phallus as the privileged signifier of humanity's subordination to language: "the phallus (by virtue of which the unconscious is language)". He thereby opened up a new field of debate around phallogocentrism—some figures like Juliet Mitchell endorsing a view of penis envy which "uses, not the man, but the phallus to which the man has to lay claim, as its key term", others strongly repudiating it.

Ernest Jones attempted to remedy Freud's initial theory penis envy by giving three alternative meanings:

1. The wish to acquire a penis, usually by swallowing it and retaining it within the body, often converting it there into a baby
2. The wish to possess a penis in the clitoris region
3. The adult wish to enjoy a penis in intercourse

=== Feminist criticisms ===
In Freud's theory, the female sexual center shifts from the clitoris to the vagina during a heterosexual life event. Freud believed in a duality between how genders construct mature sexuality in terms of the opposite gender, whereas feminists reject the notion that female sexuality can only be defined in relation to the male. Feminist development theorists instead believe that the clitoris, not the vagina, is the mature center of female sexuality because it allows a construction of mature female sexuality independent of the penis.

Karen Horney — a German psychoanalyst who also placed great emphasis on childhood experiences in psychological development — was a particular advocate of this view. She asserted the concept of "womb envy", and saw "masculine narcissism" as underlying the mainstream Freudian view.

Some feminists argue that Freud's developmental theory is heteronormative and denies women a mature sexuality independent of men; they also criticize it for privileging the vagina over the clitoris as the center of women's sexuality. They criticize the sociosexual theory for privileging heterosexual sexual activity and penile penetration in defining women's "mature state of sexuality". Others claim that the concept explains how, in a patriarchal society, women might envy the power accorded to those with a phallus.

In her academic paper "Women and Penis Envy" (1943), Clara Thompson reformulated the latter as social envy for the trappings of the dominant gender, a sociological response to female subordination under patriarchy.

Betty Friedan referred to penis envy as a purely parasitic social bias typical of Victorianism and particularly of Freud's own biography, and showed how the concept played a key role in discrediting alternative notions of femininity in the early to mid twentieth century: "Because Freud's followers could only see woman in the image defined by Freud – inferior, childish, helpless, with no possibility of happiness unless she adjusted to being man's passive object – they wanted to help women get rid of their suppressed envy, their neurotic desire to be equal. They wanted to help women find sexual fulfillment as women, by affirming their natural inferiority".

A small but influential number of feminist philosophers, working in psychoanalytic feminism, and including Luce Irigaray, Julia Kristeva, and Hélène Cixous, have taken varying post-structuralist views on the question, inspired or at least challenged by figures such as Jacques Lacan and Jacques Derrida.

== See also ==
- Envy
- Human sexuality
- Koro (disease)
- Phallic woman
