= Latency stage =

Freudian psychosexual development

The latency stage is the fourth stage of Sigmund Freud's model of a child's psychosexual development. Freud believed that the child discharges their libido (sexual energy) through a distinct body area that characterizes each stage. The latency stage is the fourth of the five Freudian psychosexual development stages: the oral, the anal, the phallic, the latent, and the genital.

== In general ==
The latency stage may begin around the age of 7 (the end of early childhood) and may continue until puberty, which happens around the age of 13. The age range is affected by child-rearing practices; mothers in developed countries, during the time when Freud was forming his theories, were more likely to stay at home with young children, and adolescents began puberty on average later than adolescents today.

Freud characterized the latency stage as a period of relative stability. During this time, no new organization of sexuality emerged, and he did not extensively focus on it. As a result, this stage is sometimes omitted in discussions of his theory's developmental stages and is instead regarded as a distinct period.

The latency stage originates during the phallic stage when the child's Oedipus complex begins to dissolve. The child realizes that their wishes and longings for the parent of the opposite sex cannot be fulfilled and will turn away from these desires.

They start to identify with the parent of the same sex. The libido is transferred from parents to friends of the same sex, clubs, and hero/role-model figures. The sexual and aggressive drives are expressed in socially accepted forms through the defense mechanisms of repression and sublimation.

During the latency stage, the energy the child previously put into the Oedipal problem can be used for developing the self. The superego is already present, but becomes more organized and principled. The child acquires culturally regarded skills and values. The child has evolved from a baby with primitive drives to a reasonable human being with complex feelings like shame, guilt and disgust. During this stage, the child learns to adapt to reality and also begins the process of what Freud terms "infantile amnesia": the repression of the child's earliest traumatic, overly sexual or evil memories.

== Other thinkers ==
Freud's daughter, the psychoanalyst Anna Freud, saw possible consequences for the child when the solution of the Oedipal problem is delayed. She states that this will lead to a variety of problems in the latency period: the child will have problems with adjusting to belonging to a group, and will show a lack of interest, school phobias and extreme homesickness (if sent away to school). However, if the Oedipal problem is resolved, the latency phase may bring the child new problems, like joining gangs, rebelling against authority and the beginnings of delinquency. On the contrary, Jacques Lacan emphasized the importance of the Oedipal problem for individuals' development and states that unsuccessful resolution of it is the most likely cause for inability to come to terms with symbolic relations such as the law and expectations of society. In most extreme cases of failure—where there is no opposition for the child's access to his mother and vice versa—the result is perversion.

The developmental psychologist and psychoanalyst Erik Erikson developed a stage model for the evolution of the ego. The latency phase corresponds to his stage of competence, or "industry and inferiority", age 5 to puberty. The child is eager to learn new skills. During this stage, the child compares their self-worth to others. Because the child can recognize major disparities in their abilities relative to other children, the child may develop a sense of inferiority to them.
