= Phallic stage =

Freudian psychosexual development

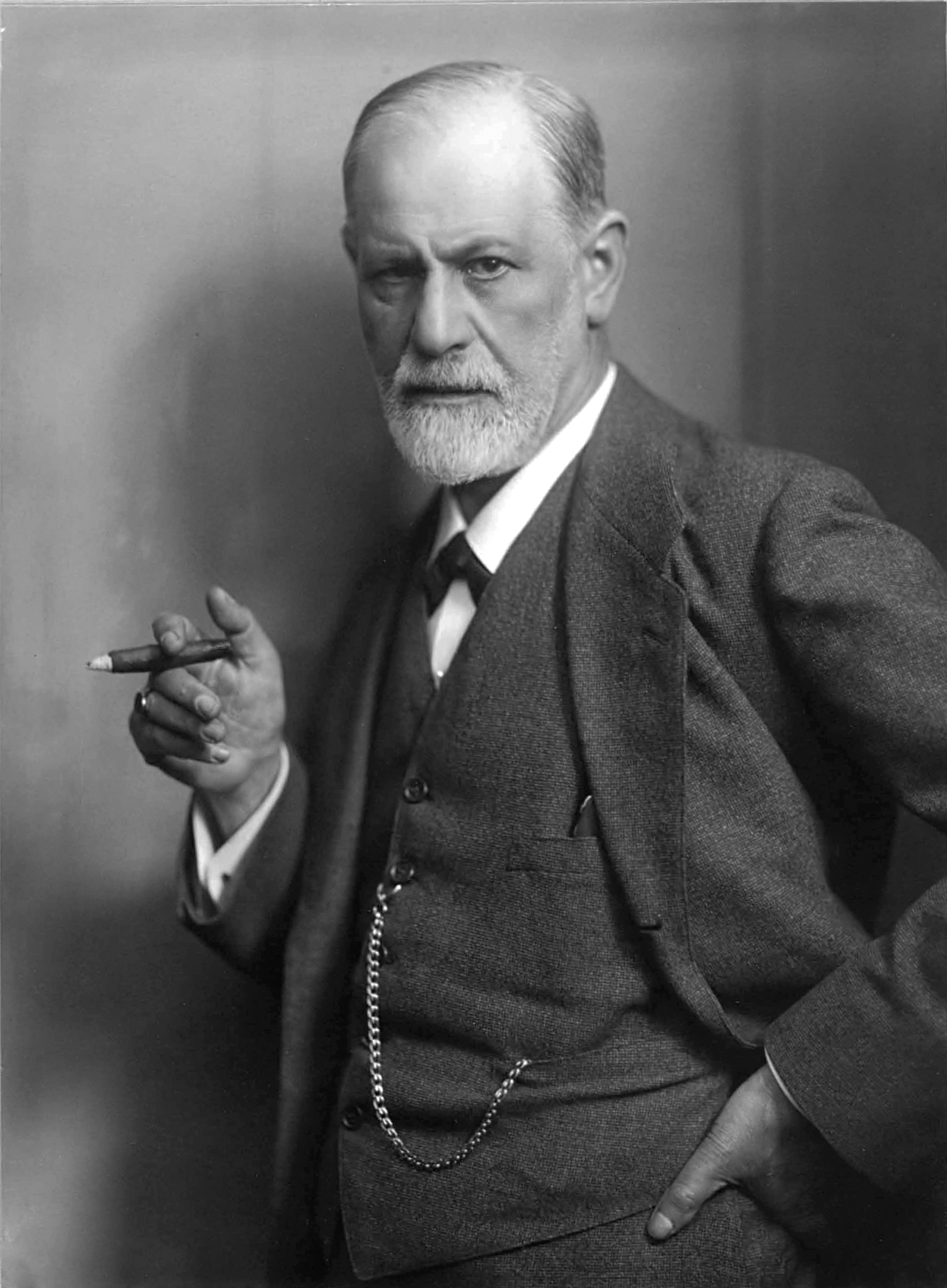
The psychoanalyst Sigmund Freud (ca. 1921)

In Freudian psychoanalysis, the phallic stage is the third stage of psychosexual development, spanning the ages of three to six years, wherein the infant's libido (desire) centers upon their genitalia as the erogenous zone. When children become aware of their bodies, the bodies of other children, and the bodies of their parents, they gratify physical curiosity by undressing and exploring each other and their genitals, the center of the phallic stage, in the course of which they learn the physical differences between the male and female sexes and their associated social roles, experiences which alter the psychologic dynamics of the parent and child relationship. The phallic stage is the third of the five Freudian psychosexual development stages: the oral, the anal, the phallic, the latent, and the genital.

== The Oedipus complex ==
In the phallic stage of psychosexual development, a boy's decisive experience is the Oedipus complex, describing his son–father competition for sexual possession of his mother. This psychological complex indirectly derives its name from the Greek mythological character Oedipus, who unwittingly killed his father and sexually possessed his mother. Initially, Freud applied the Oedipus complex to the development of boys and girls alike; he then developed the female aspect of phallic-stage psychosexual development as the feminine Oedipus attitude and the negative Oedipus complex. His student and collaborator Carl Jung proposed the "Electra complex", derived from Greek mythologic character Electra, who plotted matricidal revenge against her mother for the murder of her father, to describe a girl's psychosexual competition with her mother for possession of her father.

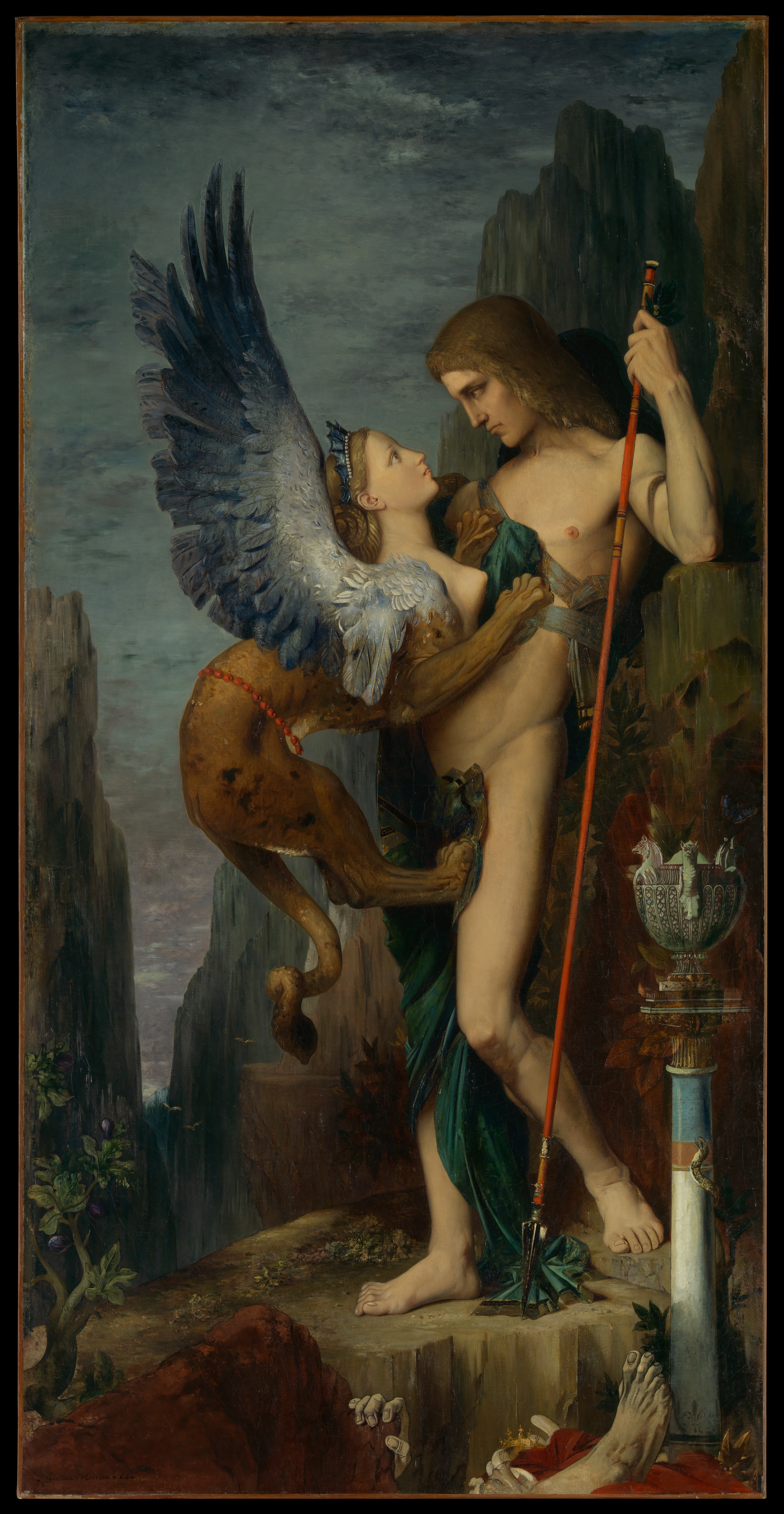
Oedipus complex: Oedipus and the Sphinx, by Gustave Moreau, 1864.

Despite the mother being the parent who primarily gratifies the child's desires, the child begins forming a discrete sexual identity – "boy", "girl" – that alters the dynamics of the parent and child relationship; the parents become the focus of infantile libidinal energy. The boy focuses his libido (sexual desire) upon his mother, and focuses jealousy and emotional rivalry against his father – because it is he who sleeps with the mother. To facilitate uniting him with the mother, the boy's id wants to kill his father (as did Oedipus), but the ego, pragmatically based upon the reality principle, knows that his father is the stronger of the two males competing to psychosexually possess the one female. Nonetheless, the fearful boy remains ambivalent about his father's place in the family, which is manifested as fear of castration by the physically greater father; the fear is an irrational, subconscious manifestation of the infantile id.

In developing a discrete psychosexual identity, boys develop castration anxiety and girls develop penis envy towards all males. The girl's envy is rooted in the biologic fact that, without a penis, she cannot sexually possess her mother as the infantile id demands. Resultantly, the girl redirects her desire for sexual union to her father. She thus psychosexually progresses to heterosexual femininity (which culminates in bearing a child) derived from earlier, infantile desires; her child replaces the absent penis. Moreover, after the phallic stage, the girl's psychosexual development includes transferring her primary erogenous zone from the infantile clitoris to the adult vagina. Freud thus considered a girl's Oedipal conflict to be more emotionally intense than that of a boy, resulting, potentially, in a woman of a submissive, less confident personality.

== Defense mechanisms ==
In both sexes, defense mechanisms provide transitory resolutions of the conflict between the drives of the Id and the drives of the Ego. The first defense mechanism is repression, the blocking of memories, emotional impulses, and ideas from the conscious mind; yet it does not resolve the id–ego conflict. The second defense mechanism is identification, by which the child incorporates, to his or her ego, the personality characteristics of the same-sex parent; in so adapting, the boy diminishes his castration anxiety, because likeness to father protects him from father's wrath as a rival for mother; by so adapting, the girl facilitates identifying with mother, who understands that, in being females, neither of them possesses a penis, and thus are not antagonists.

An unresolved fixation in the phallic stage could lead to egoism, low self-esteem, flirtatious and promiscuous females, shyness, worthlessness, and men who treat women with contempt.

== See also ==
- Phallic monism
- Phallic woman
- Psychosexual development
  - Oral stage
  - Anal stage
  - Latency stage
  - Genital stage
