= Fixation (psychology) =

Concept in psychology

Fixation (German: Fixierung) is a concept (in human psychology) that was originated by Sigmund Freud (1905) to denote the persistence of anachronistic sexual traits. The term subsequently came to denote object relationships with attachments to people or things in general persisting from childhood into adult life.

== Freud ==
In Three Essays on the Theory of Sexuality (1905), Freud distinguished the fixations of the libido on an incestuous object from a fixation upon a specific, partial aim, such as voyeurism.

Freud theorized that some humans may develop psychological fixation due to one or more of the following:

1. A lack of proper gratification during one of the psychosexual stages of development.
2. Receiving a strong impression from one of these stages, in which case the person's personality would reflect that stage throughout adult life.
3. "An excessively strong manifestation of these instincts at a very early age [which] leads to a kind of partial fixation, which then constitutes a weak point in the structure of the sexual function".

As Freud's thought developed, so did the range of possible 'fixation points' he saw as significant in producing particular neuroses. However, he continued to view fixation as "the manifestation of very early linkages — linkages which it is hard to resolve — between instincts and impressions and the objects involved in those impressions".

Psychoanalytic therapy involved producing a new transference fixation in place of the old one. The new fixation — for example a father-transference onto the analyst — may be very different from the old, but will absorb its energies and enable them eventually to be released for non-fixated purposes.

=== Objections ===
- Whether a particularly obsessive attachment is a fixation or a defensible expression of love is at times debatable. Fixation to intangibles (i.e., ideas, ideologies, etc.) can also occur. The obsessive factor of fixation is also found in symptoms pertaining to obsessive compulsive disorder, which psychoanalysts linked to a mix of early (pregenital) frustrations and gratifications.
- Fixation has been compared to psychological imprinting at an early and sensitive period of development. Others object that Freud was attempting to stress the looseness of the ties between libido and object, and the need to find a specific cause any given (perverse or neurotic) fixation.

== Post-Freudians ==
Melanie Klein saw fixation as inherently pathological – a blocking of potential sublimation by way of repression.

Erik H. Erikson distinguished fixation to zone – oral or anal, for example – from fixation to mode, such as taking in, as with his instance of the man who "may eagerly absorb the 'milk of wisdom' where he once desired more tangible fluids from more sensuous containers". Eric Berne, developed his insight further as part of transactional analysis, suggesting that "particular games and scripts, and their accompanying physical symptoms, are based in appropriate zones and modes".

Heinz Kohut saw the grandiose self as a fixation upon a normal childhood stage; while other post-Freudians explored the role of fixation in aggression and criminality.

== In popular culture ==
- Coleridge's Christabel has been seen as using witchcraft as a vehicle to explore psychological fixation.
- Tennyson has been considered to show a romantic fixation on days of old.

== See also ==
- Fanaticism
- Father complex
- Idée fixe (psychology)
- Psychical inertia
- Regression (psychology)
- Substance dependence
