= Oral stage =

Freudian Psychosexual development

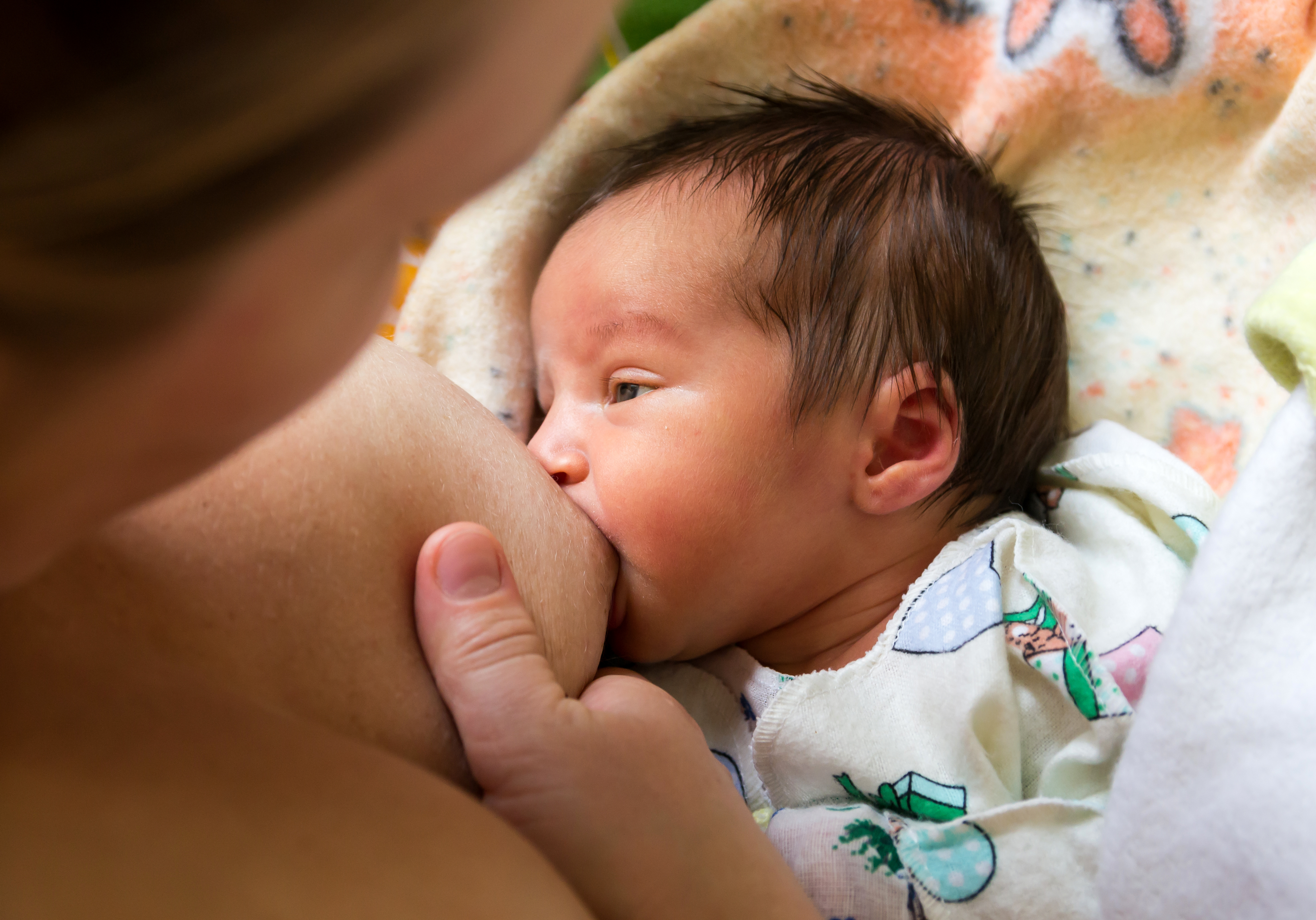
An infant breastfeeding.

In Freudian psychoanalysis, the term oral stage denotes the first psychosexual development stage wherein the mouth of the infant is their primary erogenous zone. Spanning the life period from birth to the age of 18 months, the oral stage is the first of the five Freudian psychosexual development stages: the oral, the anal, the phallic, the latent, and the genital.

== Oral-stage fixation ==
Freud proposed that if the nursing child's appetite were thwarted during any libidinal development stage, the anxiety would persist into adulthood as a neurosis (functional mental disorder). Therefore, an infantile oral fixation would be manifest as an obsession with oral stimulation. If weaned either too early or too late, the infant might fail to resolve the emotional conflicts of the oral stage of psychosexual development and might develop a maladaptive oral fixation.

The infant who is neglected (insufficiently fed) or who is over-protected (over-fed) in the course of being nursed might become an orally fixated person. This fixation might have two effects: (i) the neglected child might become a psychologically dependent adult continually seeking the oral stimulation denied in infancy, thereby becoming a manipulative person in fulfilling their needs, rather than maturing to independence; (ii) the over-protected child might resist maturation and return to dependence upon others in fulfilling their needs. Theoretically, oral-stage fixations are manifested as garrulousness (talkativeness), smoking, continual oral stimulus (eating, chewing objects), and alcoholism.

== See also ==
- Amphimixis
- Psychosexual development
