= Resistance (psychoanalysis) =

Term used in psychoanalysis describing oppositional behaviors

In psychoanalysis, resistance is the individual's efforts to prevent repressed drives, feelings or thoughts from being integrated into conscious awareness.

Sigmund Freud, the founder of psychoanalytic theory, developed the concept of resistance as he worked with patients who suddenly developed uncooperative behaviors during the analytic session. Freud reasoned that an individual that is suffering from a psychological affliction, which in psychoanalytic theory is derived from the presence of repressed illicit impulses or thoughts, may engage in efforts to impede attempts to confront such unconscious impulses or thoughts.

== Resistance and the Unconscious ==
In an early exposition of his new technique, Freud wrote that there is "another point of view which you may take up in order to understand the psychoanalytic method. The discovery of the unconscious and the introduction of it into consciousness is performed in the face of a continuous resistance on the part of the patient. The process of bringing this unconscious material to light is associated with pain, and because of this pain the patient again and again rejects it". He went on to add that "It is for you then to interpose in this conflict in the patient's mental life. If you succeed in persuading him to accept, by virtue of a better understanding, something that up to now, in consequence of this automatic regulation by pain, he has rejected (repressed), you will then have accomplished something towards his education ... Psychoanalytic treatment may in general be conceived of as such a re-education in overcoming internal resistances".

=== Primary/secondary gains from illness in resistance ===
Although the term resistance as it is known today in psychotherapy is largely associated with Sigmund Freud, the idea that some patients "cling to their disease" was a popular one in medicine in the nineteenth century, and referred to patients whose maladies were presumed to persist due to the secondary gains of social, physical, and financial benefits associated with illness. While Freud was trained in what is known as the (secondary) gain from illness that follows a neurosis, he was more interested in the unconscious processes through which he could explain the primary gains that patients derive from their psychiatric symptoms.

The model he devised suggests that the symptoms represent an unconscious tradeoff in exchange for the sufferer being spared other, experientially worse, psychological displeasures, by way of what Freud called a compromise formation; "settling the conflict by constructing a symptom is the most convenient way out and the one most agreeable to the pleasure principle".

=== Resistance as the product of conflicting agencies ===
To Freud, the primary gains that stood behind the patient's resistance were the result of an intrapsychic compromise, reached between two or more conflicting agencies: "psychoanalysis ... maintains that the isolation and unconsciousness of this [one] group of ideas have been caused by an active opposition on the part of other groups". Freud called the one psychic agency the "repressing" consciousness, and the other agency, the unconscious, he eventually referred to as the "id".

The compromise the two competing parties strive for is to achieve maximum drive satisfaction with minimum resultant pain (negative reactions from within and without). Freud theorized that psychopathology was due to unsuccessful compromises – "We have long observed that every neurosis has the result, and therefore probably the purpose, of forcing the patient out of real life, of alienating him from actuality" – as opposed to "successful defense" which resulted in "apparent health".

Key players in the Kompromisslösung theory of symptom production, at the core of Freud's theory of resistance, were: repression (often used interchangeably with the term anticathexis), defense, displeasure, anxiety, danger, compromise, and symptom. As Freud wrote, "The action undertaken to protect repression is observable in analytic treatment as resistance. Resistance presupposes the existence of what I have called anticathexis."

== Forms of resistance ==
In 1926, Freud was to alter his view of anxiety, with implications for his view of resistance. "Whereas the old view made it natural to suppose that anxiety arose from the libido belonging to the repressed instinctual impulses, the new one, on the contrary, made the ego the source of anxiety".

Freud still understood resistance to be intimately bound up with the fact of transference: "It may thus be said that the theory of psycho-analysis is an attempt to account for two observed facts that strike one conspicuously and unexpectedly whenever an attempt is made to trace the symptoms of a neurotic back to their source in his past life: the facts of transference and resistance. Any line of investigation, no matter what its direction, which recognizes these two facts and takes them as the starting-point of its work may call itself psychoanalysis, though it arrives at results other than my own". Indeed, to this day most major schools of psychotherapeutic thought continue to at least recognize, if not "take as the starting-point", the two phenomena of transference and resistance.

Nevertheless his new conceptualisation of the role of anxiety caused him to reframe the phenomena of resistance, to embrace how "The analyst has to combat no less than five kinds of resistance, emanating from three directions – the ego, the id and the superego". He considered the ego to be the source of three types of resistance: repression, transference and gain from illness, i.e., secondary gain. Freud defined a fourth variety, Id resistance, arising from the id, as resistance that requires "working-through" the product of the repetition compulsion. A fifth, coming from the superego and the last to be discovered, "... seems to originate from the sense of guilt or the need for punishment" – i.e., self-sabotage.

All these serve the explicit purpose of defending the ego against feelings of discomfort, for, as Freud wrote: "It is hard for the ego to direct its attention to perceptions and ideas which it has up till now made a rule of avoiding, or to acknowledge as belonging to itself impulses that are the complete opposite of those which it knows as its own."

=== Repression ===
Repression is the form of resistance where the ego pushes offensive memories, ideas, and impulses down into the unconscious. Essentially, the patient is unconsciously hiding memories from the conscious mind.

=== Transference ===
Typically unconscious, transference is when the patient allows past experiences to affect present relationships. In therapy, this may come about if the therapist reminds the patient, either consciously or unconsciously, of someone in their past who may have had an early impact on their life. Subsequently, the patient may suddenly tend to regard the therapist in either a positive or negative manner, depending upon the nature of the past influence.

=== Ego-resistance ===
This form of resistance is a neurotic regression to a proposed state of childlike safety. Usually, it involves the patient's attempts to gain attention and sympathy by emphasizing minor medical symptoms (i.e. headaches, nausea, and depression).

=== Id resistance ===
Id resistance is the opposition put up by the unconscious id against any change in its accustomed patterns of gratification. Id resistance reflects the unconscious desire for consistency in a manner that is based upon the pleasure principle. Since the id is an innate portion of human instinct, interpretation of the conscious is an insufficient method, thus the psychoanalyst must first be able to surmount resistances by the means of deduction of patients' unconscious defenses that are presented through exploitation of the mechanism of transference.

==== Freud's analysis ====
As Freud's clinical practice progressed, he noticed how, even when his patients' conscious minds had accepted the existence of, and begun working through their neurotic patterns, they still had to deal with what he called Id resistance: "the resistance of the unconscious...the power of the compulsion to repeat – the attraction exerted by the unconscious prototypes upon the repressed instinctual process".

==== Later developments ====
W. R. D. Fairbairn saw id resistance in terms of early attachment to an internalised bad object, so that the individual remained bound by ties of yearning towards, and anger at rejection by, the repudiating parent of childhood.

Id resistance manifests itself in group therapy in three main psychosexual forms: oral-level id resistance might take the form of an obsequious dependence on the therapist's words, or alternatively express hostility in cutting, biting remarks; anal hostility can be displayed in dumping material indiscriminately on the therapist; and phallic-level id resistance appears in the form of competition with, and/or seductive ploys towards, therapist and other group members. Acting out and acting in of id resistances in group therapy need to be contained by an emphasis on words as the central means of therapeutic interaction.

Eric Berne saw personality in terms of a life-script laid down in early childhood, and considered that the main obstacle to recovery in therapy "is the pull of the script, something like the Id resistance of Freud".

=== Superego resistance ===
Superego resistance is the opposition put up in therapy against recovery by the patient's conscience, their sense of underlying guilt. It prompts personal punishment by the means of self-sabotage or self-imposed impediment. It has been considered by some (though not by Freud) the weakest form of resistance, reflecting the moralistic sentiments of the superego.

==== Freud's late formulation ====
Freud in the twenties came belatedly to the realisation of the importance of an 'unconscious morality' in opposing his therapeutic aims. Thereupon he divided the sources of resistance into five, pointing out that "The fifth, coming from the super-ego and the last to be discovered…seems to originate from the sense of guilt or need for punishment". However he also pointed out how often the patient does not feel guilty so much as unwell, when their superego resistance is in operation.

==== Subsequent developments ====
Object relations theory tended to see superego resistance in terms of a patient's relationship with an internalised critical/persecutory parent figure. Reluctance to end the 'security' of the bond to the internalised parent strengthens the superego resistance. Where the ego ideal is harshly perfectionist, or represents an internalised mother who idealised suffering over enjoyment, superego resistance takes the form of a refusal to be 'corrupted' by the progress of the therapy.

In group therapy, superego resistance may be externalised or internalised. In the first case, a moralistic sub-group may form, which is hypercritical of other, less conformist members; while in the second case (of internalisation), the severity of the inward conscience, and the need for punishment, may lead to action destructive to the self and to the progress of the treatment.

== Freud's treatment of resistance ==
Freud viewed all five categories of resistance as requiring more than just intellectual insight or understanding to overcome. Instead he favored a slow process of working through.

Working through allows patients "... to get to know this resistance" and "... discover the repressed instinctual trends which are feeding the resistance" and it is this experientially convincing process that "distinguishes analytic treatment from every kind of suggestive treatment". For this reason Freud insisted that therapists remain neutral, saying only as much as "is absolutely necessary to keep him [the patient] talking", so that resistance could be seen as clearly as possible in patients' transference, and become obvious to the patients themselves. The inextricable link suggested by Freud between transference and resistance perhaps encapsulates his legacy to psychotherapy.

== Applications ==
Psychoanalysis is, altogether, considered to be a type of insight-oriented therapeutic program. Despite general initial reservations, these types of programs have since transitioned from being quite marginal to becoming more well-known and mainstream. In consideration to the theory of resistance itself, within a clinical setting, the expression of resistance is considered to be a significant stage to recovery because it reveals the presence of repression. Additionally, it is indicative of progress in the effort of resolving any underlying issues that may be the cause of personal dysfunction. As resistance is theorized to be a manifestation of the unconscious mind's attempts to protect the ego, it is the task of the psychoanalyst to combat this opposition by directing the patient to confront the unacceptable desires or uncomfortable memories. By this course of action, the patient may reach a cathartic conclusion.

== Criticisms ==
Psychoanalysts and their critics remain divided with regard to the concept of resistance. Since Freud first developed his theory of resistance, he has been significantly criticized for using personally favorable and unfalsifiable theory, among other problems. For example, if a patient were to agree with a psychoanalyst's inference about themselves, it is a confirmation that there is something they are repressing; however, if the patient disagrees, it is also a sign they are engaged in repression, which means the psychoanalyst is correct in either scenario (see also: Gaslighting, Kafkatrap).

Steve de Shazer, using a solution-focused therapy model, declared in the mid-1980s that resistance was dead, and that clients who do not follow therapists' directions should be seen as "cooperating" by showing therapists how best to help them.

Some relational psychoanalysts believe that the success of psychoanalysis is not due to its various explanatory systems or its reasoning about repression, but rather simply due to the process of interpersonal communication. Analyst Philip Rinstrom said, "As a consequence, in contrast to the traditional therapist's role, the relational approach makes it 'open game' for the patient to question the thoughts, intentions, and perspective of the therapist without this being seen a priori as resistance."
