= Therapeutic relationship =

Interactions between therapists and patients

The therapeutic relationship refers to the relationship between a healthcare professional and a client or patient. It is the means by which a therapist and a client hope to engage with each other and effect beneficial change in the client.

In psychoanalysis the therapeutic relationship has been theorized to consist of three parts: the working alliance, transference/countertransference, and the real relationship. Evidence on each component's unique contribution to the outcome has been gathered, as well as evidence on the interaction between components. In contrast to a social relationship, the focus of the therapeutic relationship is on the client's needs and goals.

== Therapeutic Alliance / Working Alliance ==
The therapeutic alliance, or the working alliance may be defined as the joining of a client's reasonable side with a therapist's working or analyzing side. Bordin conceptualized the working alliance as consisting of three parts: tasks, goals and bond. Tasks are what the therapist and client agree need to be done to reach the client's goals. Goals are what the client hopes to gain from therapy, based on their presenting concerns. The bond forms from trust and confidence that the tasks will bring the client closer to their goals.

Research on the working alliance suggests that it is a strong predictor of psychotherapy or counseling client outcome. Also, the way in which the working alliance unfolds has been found to be related to client outcomes. Generally, an alliance that experiences a rupture that is repaired is related to better outcomes than an alliance with no ruptures, or an alliance with a rupture that is not repaired. Also, in successful cases of brief therapy, the working alliance has been found to follow a high-low-high pattern over the course of the therapy. In a study of adolescent girls receiving prolonged exposure therapy or client-centered therapy for PTSD, improvements in adolescent-rated therapeutic alliance were associated with greater reductions in PTSD severity across both treatment conditions.

== Necessary and sufficient conditions ==
In the Humanistic approach, Carl Rogers identified a number of necessary and sufficient conditions that are required for therapeutic change to take place. Rogers stated that there are six necessary and sufficient conditions required for therapeutic change:

1. Therapist–client psychological contact: A relationship between client and therapist must exist, and it must be a relationship in which each person's perception of the other is important.
2. Client incongruence: That incongruence exists between the client's experience and awareness.
3. Therapist congruence, or genuineness: The therapist is congruent within the therapeutic relationship. The therapist is deeply involved, they are not 'acting' and they can draw on their own experiences (self-disclosure) to facilitate the relationship.
4. Therapist unconditional positive regard: The therapist accepts the client unconditionally, without judgment, disapproval or approval. This facilitates increased self-regard in the client, as they can begin to become aware of experiences in which their view of self-worth was distorted or denied.
5. Therapist empathic understanding: The therapist experiences an empathic understanding of the client's internal frame of reference. Accurate empathy on the part of the therapist helps the client believe the therapist's unconditional regard for them.
6. Client perception: That the client perceives, to at least a minimal degree, the therapist's unconditional positive regard and empathic understanding.

== Transference and Counter-Transference ==
The concept of therapeutic relationship was described by Freud (1912) as "friendly affectionate feeling" in the form of a positive transference. However, transferences, or more correctly here, the therapist's 'counter-transferences' can also be negative. Today transference (from the client) and counter-transference (from the therapist), is understood as subconsciously associating a person in the present, with a person from a past relationship. For example, you meet a new client who reminds you of a former lover. This would be a counter-transference, in that the therapist is responding to the client with thoughts and feelings attached to a person in a past relationship. Ideally, the therapeutic relationship will start with a positive transference for the therapy to have a good chance of effecting positive therapeutic change.

== Operationalization and Measurement ==
Several scales have been developed to assess the patient-professional relationship in therapy, including the Working Alliance Inventory (WAI), the Barrett-Lennard Relationship Inventory, and the California Psychotherapy Alliance Scales (CALPAS). The Scale To Assess Relationships (STAR) was specifically developed to measure the therapeutic relationship in community psychiatry, or within care in the community settings.

== See also ==
- Acting in
- Acting out
- Body-centred countertransference
- Clinical Psychology
- Counselling
- Counseling Psychology
- Countertransference
- Existential counselling
- Existential Therapy
- Gestalt Therapy
- Humanistic Psychology
- Intersubjectivity
- Interpersonal psychoanalysis
- Intersubjective psychoanalysis
- Negative therapeutic reaction
- Object relations theory
- Parallel process
- Person-centered therapy
- Psychoanalysis
- Psychoanalytic Theory
- Psychodynamics
- Psychodynamic psychotherapy
- Psychology
- Psychotherapy
- Relational psychoanalysis
- Relational psychodynamics
- Systemic therapy
- Systems psychology
- Therapeutic alliance
- Transference
- Transpersonal Psychology
