= Neutrality (psychoanalysis) =

Neutrality is an essential part of the analyst's attitude during treatment, developed as part of the non-directive, evenly suspended listening which Freud used to complement the patient's free association in the talking cure.

== Early development ==
In the Little Hans case study of 1909, Freud criticised the boy's father (the prime 'analyst'): "He asks too much and investigates in accord with his own presuppositions instead of letting the little boy express himself". In 1912 he laid down the mirror rule, that the analyst should not reciprocate the patient's confidences, but only reflect back what they themselves contained. In 1915 he introduced the term neutrality, warning especially against too great eagerness to cure; and in 1919 he wrote against offering guidance or counselling – synthesis as opposed to analysis – as to what form the patient's cure should take.

Freud's guidelines, especially with regard to the bracketing of ethical judgements, and personal disclosures, rapidly became accepted in the psychoanalytic mainstream, as did the need to respect the patient's speech and not impose preconceptions on it.

== Transference ==
The principle of neutrality took on especial force as regards manifestations of transference, particularly given the strength of the emotions aroused thereby. Neutrality meant resisting the natural impulse to reciprocate affects, so as to remain in a position to analyse the transference, not respond to it.

== Deviations and criticisms ==
Freud's analytic practice was noticeably less austere than the principles of neutrality he laid down: he would argue with, praise, and lend money to patients, and even records feeding the Rat Man on one occasion. However the first theoretical challenge to Freud's concept came from Sándor Ferenczi, who saw the analyst's attitude of non-disclosure in particular as part of the problem not the solution. Others would subsequently expand on Ferenczi's points, Nina Coltart for example suspecting the "austere and benevolently neutral manner which we hold as our working ideal" and stressing that "we can do no harm to a patient by showing authentic affect".

== See also ==
- Abstinence
- Acting in
- Countertransference
- Evenly-suspended attention
- Intersubjective psychoanalysis
- Therapeutic alliance
- Trigant Burrow
