= Abstinence (psychoanalysis) =

Abstinence (or the rule of abstinence) is the principle of analytic reticence and/or frustration within a clinical situation. It is a central feature of psychoanalytic theory which relates to the handling of the transference in analysis.

As Sigmund Freud wrote in 1914:

The cure must be carried through in abstinence. I mean by that not physical self-denial alone, nor the denial of every desire....But I want to state the principle that one must permit neediness and yearning to remain as forces favoring work and change.

== Later formulations ==
The validity of the abstinence principle has been rediscovered and reaffirmed in a variety of subsequent analytic traditions.

- Jacques Lacan re-formulated the principle via the concept of 'analytic bridge' –the analyst necessarily playing the part of the unresponding dummy to bring the patient's unconscious motivations out into the open.
- Eric Berne saw analytic frustration as a means of avoiding playing a part in the patient's life script.
- R. D. Laing, in the context of the false self, saw analytic abstinence operating in opposition to false self collusion: "It is in terms of basic frustration of the self's search for a collusive complement for false identity that Freud's dictum that analysis should be conducted under conditions of maximal frustration takes on its most cogent meaning".
- D. W. Winnicott in the context of his notion of 'holding' the patient emphasised that understanding through verbal interpretation gave a deeper sense of holding than the physical act, use of which by the therapist could blur the symbolic nature of the analytic space.

== Debates ==
The rule of abstinence has come under increasing challenge by Interpersonal and Intersubjective psychoanalysis, concerned about the inflexibility of the rule, and the way its relentless application may provoke unnecessary hostility, even an iatrogenic transference neurosis.

Defenders of the rule, against the practice of the warm supportive analyst, argue against the easy seductiveness of being overly 'helpful' in a self-defeating way already sketched out by Freud himself. The concept of optimal responsiveness – balancing frustration and gratification from moment to moment – offers some mediation in the dispute.

== See also ==
- Acting in
- Acting out
- Charles Rycroft
- Countertransference
- Evenly-suspended attention
- Jean Laplanche
- Parallel process
- Ralph Greenson
- Sándor Ferenczi
