= Emotional dysregulation =

Difficulty controlling and moderating one's emotional reactions

Emotional dysregulation is characterized by an inability to flexibly respond to and manage emotional states, resulting in intense and prolonged emotional reactions that deviate from social norms, given the nature of the environmental stimuli encountered. Such reactions not only deviate from accepted social norms but also surpass what is informally deemed appropriate or proportional to the encountered stimuli.

It is often linked to physical factors such as brain injury, psychological factors such as adverse childhood experiences, and ongoing maltreatment including child abuse, neglect, or institutional abuse.

Emotional dysregulation may be present in people with psychiatric and neurodevelopmental disorders such as attention deficit hyperactivity disorder, autism spectrum disorder, bipolar disorder, borderline personality disorder, complex post-traumatic stress disorder, and fetal alcohol spectrum disorders. The dysregulation of emotions is also present in individuals with mood disorders and anxiety disorders. In such cases as borderline personality disorder and complex post-traumatic stress disorder, hypersensitivity to emotional stimuli causes a slower return to a normal emotional state and may reflect deficits in prefrontal regulatory regions. Damage to the frontal cortices of the brain can cause deficits in behavior that can severely impact an individual's ability to manage their daily life. As such, the period after a traumatic brain injury, such as a frontal lobe disorder, can be marked by emotional dysregulation. This is also true of neurodegenerative diseases.

Possible manifestations of emotion dysregulation include extreme tearfulness, angry outbursts or behavioral outbursts such as destroying or throwing objects, aggression towards self or others, and threats to kill oneself. Emotion dysregulation can lead to behavioral problems and can interfere with a person's social interactions and relationships at home, in school, or at their place of employment.

== Signs and symptoms ==
Smoking, self-harm, eating disorders, and addiction have all been associated with emotional dysregulation. Somatoform disorders may be caused by a decreased ability to regulate and experience emotions or an inability to express emotions in a positive way. Individuals who have difficulty regulating emotions are at risk for eating disorders and substance abuse, as they may use food or substances as a way to regulate their emotions. Emotional dysregulation is also found in people who have an increased risk of developing a mental disorder, particularly an affective disorder such as depression or bipolar disorder.

=== Childhood ===
Dysregulation is more prevalent in children, and is generally seen to decrease as children develop. During early childhood, emotional dysregulation or reactivity is considered to be situational rather than indicative of emotional disorders. It is important to consider parental mood disorders as genetic and environmental determinants. Children of parents with symptoms of depression are less likely to learn strategies for regulating their emotions and are at risk of inheriting a mood disorder. When parents have difficulty regulating their emotions, they often cannot teach their children to regulate properly. The role of parents in a child's development is acknowledged by attachment theory, which argues that the characteristics of the caregiver-child relationship impact future relationships. Current research indicates that parent-child relationships characterized by less affection and greater hostility may result in children developing emotional regulation problems. If the child's emotional needs are ignored or rejected, they may experience greater difficulty dealing with emotions in the future. Moreover, conflict between parents is linked to increased emotional reactivity or dysregulation in children. Other factors involved include the quality of relationship with peers, the child's temperament, and social or cognitive understanding. Additionally, loss or grief can contribute to emotional dysregulation.

Research has shown that failures in emotional regulation may be related to the display of acting out, externalizing disorders, or behavior problems. When presented with challenging tasks, children who were found to have defects in emotional regulation (high-risk) spent less time attending to tasks and more time throwing tantrums or fretting than children without emotional regulation problems (low-risk). High-risk children had difficulty with self-regulation, had difficulty complying with requests from caregivers and were more defiant. Emotional dysregulation has also been associated with childhood social withdrawal.

==== Internalizing behaviors ====
Emotional dysregulation in children can be associated with internalizing behaviors including:

- exhibiting emotions too intense for a situation;
- difficulty calming down when upset;
- difficulty decreasing negative emotions;
- being less able to calm themselves;
- difficulty understanding emotional experiences;
- becoming avoidant or aggressive when dealing with negative emotions; and
- experiencing more negative emotions.

==== Externalizing behaviors ====
Emotional dysregulation in children can be associated with externalizing behaviors including:

- exhibiting more extreme emotions;
- difficulty identifying emotional cues;
- difficulty recognizing their own emotions;
- focusing on the negative;
- difficulty controlling their attention;
- being impulsive;
- difficulty decreasing their negative emotions; and
- difficulty calming down when upset.

=== Adolescence ===
In adolescents, emotional dysregulation is a risk factor for many mental health disorders including depressive disorders, anxiety disorders, post-traumatic stress disorder, bipolar disorder, borderline personality disorder, substance use disorder, alcohol use disorder, eating disorders, oppositional defiant disorder, and disruptive mood dysregulation disorder. Dysregulation is also associated with self-injury, suicidal ideation, suicide attempts, and risky sexual behavior. Emotional dysregulation is not a diagnosis, but an indicator of an emotional or behavioral problem that may need intervention.

Attachment theory and the idea of an insecure attachment are implicated in emotional dysregulation. Greater attachment security correlates with less emotional dysregulation in daughters. Moreover, it has been observed that more female teens struggle with emotional dysregulation than males. Professional treatment, such as therapy or admittance into a psychiatric facility, is recommended.

=== Adulthood ===
Emotional dysregulation tends to present as emotional responses that may seem excessive compared to the situation. Individuals with emotional dysregulation may have difficulty calming down, avoiding difficult feelings, or focusing on the negative. On average, women tend to score higher on scales of emotional reactivity than men. A study at University College Dublin found that dysregulation correlates to negative feelings about one's ability to cope with emotions and rumination in adults. They also found dysregulation to be common in a sample of individuals not affected by mental disorders.

Part of emotional dysregulation, which is a core characteristic in borderline personality disorder, is affective instability, which manifests as rapid and frequent shifts in mood of high affect intensity and rapid onset of emotions, often triggered by environmental stimuli. The return to a stable emotional state is notably delayed, exacerbating the challenge of achieving emotional equilibrium. This instability is further intensified by an acute sensitivity to psychosocial cues, leading to significant challenges in managing emotions effectively.

== Child psychopathology ==
There are links between child emotional dysregulation and later psychopathology. For instance, ADHD symptoms are associated with problems with emotional regulation, motivation, and arousal. One study found a connection between emotional dysregulation at 5 and 10 months, and parent-reported problems with anger and distress at 18 months. Low levels of emotional regulation behaviors at 5 months were also related to non-compliant behaviors at 30 months. While links have been found between emotional dysregulation and child psychopathology, the mechanisms behind how early emotional dysregulation and later psychopathology are related are not yet clear.

== Effect on relationships ==
=== Established relationships ===
Relationships are generally linked to better well-being, but dissatisfaction in relationships can lead to increased divorce, worsened health, and potential violence. Emotional dysregulation plays a role in relationship quality and overall satisfaction. It can be difficult for emotionally dysregulated individuals to maintain healthy relationships. People who struggle with emotional dysregulation often externalize, internalize, or dissociate when exposed to stressors. These behaviors are attempts to regulate emotions but often are ineffective in addressing stress in relationships. This commonly presents itself as intense anxiety around relationships, poor ability to set and sustain boundaries, frequent and damaging arguments, preoccupation with loneliness, worries about losing a relationship, and jealous or idealizing feelings towards others. These feelings may be accompanied by support-seeking behaviors such as clinging, smothering, or seeking to control.

The counterpart of emotional dysregulation, emotional regulation, strengthens relationships. The ability to regulate negative emotions in particular is linked to positive coping and thus higher relationship satisfaction. Emotional regulation and communication skills are linked to secure attachment, which has been related to higher partner support as well as openness in discussing negative experiences and resolving conflict. On the other hand, emotional dysregulation has a negative impact on relationships. Multiple studies note the effects of emotion dysregulation on relationship quality. One study found that relationship satisfaction is lower in couples that lack impulse control or regulatory strategies. Another study found that both husbands' and wives' emotional reactivity was negatively linked with marriage quality as well as perceptions of partner responsiveness. The literature concludes that dysregulation increases instances of perceived criticism, contributes to physical and psychological violence, and worsens depression, anxiety, and sexual difficulties. Dysregulation has also been observed to lower empathy and decrease relationship satisfaction, quality, and intimacy.

==== Sexual health ====
Research conflicts on whether higher levels of emotional reactivity are linked to increases or decreases in sexual desire. Moreover, this effect could differ between men and women based on observed differences in emotional reactivity between genders. Some research posits that higher emotional reactivity in women is linked to greater sexual attraction in their male partners. However, difficulties in regulating emotions have been linked to poorer sexual health, both in terms of ability and overall satisfaction.

Emotional dysregulation plays a role in nonconsensual and violent sexual encounters. Emotional regulation skills prevent verbal coercion by regulating feelings of sexual attraction in men. Consequently, a lack of emotional regulation skills can cause both internalizing and externalizing behaviors in a sexual context. This may mean violence, which can serve as a strategy for regulating emotion. In a non-violent context, insecurely attached individuals may seek to satisfy their need for connection or to resolve relational issues with sex. Communication can also be hindered, as emotional dysregulation has been linked to an inability to express oneself in sexual situations. This can lead to victimization as well as further sexual difficulties. Thus, the ability to both recognize emotions and express negative emotions are important for communication and social adjustment, including within sexual contexts.

==== Mediating effects ====
While personal characteristics and experiences can contribute to externalizing and internalizing behaviors as listed above, emotional regulation has an interpersonal aspect. Couples who effectively co-regulate have higher emotional satisfaction and stability. Openly discussing emotions in the relationship can help to validate feelings of insecurity and encourage closeness. For partners who struggle with emotional dysregulation, there are available treatments. Couples' therapy has shown itself to be an effective method of improving relationship satisfaction and quality by positively affecting the process of emotional regulation in relationships.

== Protective factors ==
Early experiences with caregivers can lead to differences in emotional regulation. The responsiveness of a caregiver to an infant's signals can help an infant regulate their emotional systems. Caregiver interaction styles that overwhelm a child or that are unpredictable may undermine emotional regulation development. Effective strategies involve working with a child to support developing self-control, such as modeling a desired behavior rather than demanding it.

The richness of an environment that a child is exposed to helps the development of emotional regulation. An environment must provide appropriate levels of freedom and constraint. The environment must allow opportunities for a child to practice self-regulation. An environment with opportunities to practice social skills without overstimulation or excessive frustration helps a child develop self-regulation skills.

== Substance use ==
Several variables have been explored to explain the connection between emotional dysregulation and substance use in young adults, such as child maltreatment, cortisol levels, family environment, and symptoms of depression and anxiety. Vilhena-Churchill and Goldstein (2014) explored the association between childhood maltreatment and emotional dysregulation. More severe childhood maltreatment was found to be associated with an increase in difficulty regulating emotion, which in turn was associated with a greater likelihood of coping by using marijuana. Kliewer et al. (2016) performed a study on the relationship between negative family emotional climate, emotional dysregulation, blunted anticipatory cortisol, and substance use in adolescents. Increased negative family emotional climate was found to be associated with high levels of emotional dysregulation, which was then associated with increased substance use. Girls were seen to have blunted anticipatory cortisol levels, which was also associated with an increase in substance use. Childhood events and family climate with emotional dysregulation are both factors seemingly linked to substance use. Prosek, Giordano, Woehler, Price, and McCullough (2018) explored the relationship between mental health and emotional regulation in collegiate illicit substance users. Illicit drug users reported higher levels of depression and anxiety symptoms. Emotional dysregulation was more prominent in illicit drug users in the sense that they had less clarity and were less aware of their emotions when the emotions were occurring.

== Treatment ==
Many people experience dysregulation and can struggle at times with uncontrollable emotions. Thus, potential underlying issues are important to consider in determining severity. As the ability to appropriately express and regulate emotions is related to better relationships and mental health, parental support can help regulate the emotions of children struggling with emotional dysregulation. Training to help parents address this issue focuses on predictability and consistency. These tenets are thought to provide comfort by creating a sense of familiarity and thus safety.

While cognitive behavioral therapy (CBT) is the most widely prescribed treatment for such psychiatric disorders, a commonly prescribed psychotherapeutic treatment for emotional dysregulation is dialectical behavioral therapy (DBT), a psychotherapy which promotes the use of mindfulness, a concept called dialectics, and emphasis on the importance of validation and maintaining healthy behavioral habits.

When diagnosed as being part of ADHD, norepinephrine and dopamine reuptake inhibitors such as methylphenidate (Ritalin) and atomoxetine are often used. A few studies have also showed promise in terms of non-pharmacological treatments for people with ADHD and emotional problems, although the research is limited and requires additional inquiry.

Eye Movement Desensitization and Reprocessing (EMDR) can help recovery from emotional dysregulation in cases where the dysregulation is a symptom of prior trauma. Outside of therapy, there are helpful strategies to help individuals recognize how they are feeling and put space between an event and their response. These include mindfulness, affirmations, and gratitude journaling. Hypnosis may also help to improve emotional regulation. Movement such as yoga and aerobic exercise can also be therapeutic by aiding with regulation and the ability to understand how one's mind influences behavior.

== Etymology ==
The word dysregulation is a neologism created by combining the prefix dys- to regulation. According to Webster's Dictionary, dys- has various roots and is of Greek origin. With Latin and Greek roots, it is akin to Old English tō-, te- 'apart' and Sanskrit dus- 'bad, difficult'. It is frequently confused with the spelling disregulation, with the prefix dis meaning 'the opposite of' or 'absence of'; while disregulation refers to the removal or absence of regulation, dysregulation refers to ways of regulating that are inappropriate or ineffective.

== See also ==
- Adrenal insufficiency
- Alexithymia
- Conduct disorder
- Emotional lability
- Emotional self-regulation
- Epigenetics of anxiety and stress–related disorders
- Pseudobulbar affect
- Reduced affect display
- Spiritual crisis
- WAVE Trust
