= Evenly suspended attention =

In psychoanalysis, evenly suspended attention is a form of analytical attention that is removed from both theoretical presuppositions and therapeutic goals. By not fixating on any particular part of the analysand's communication and allowing freedom of the unconscious, the analyst can mindfully benefit from the counterpart rule of free association, on the part of the analysand, to analyze their symptomatic patterns and behaviors.

It was originally proposed by Sigmund Freud in 1912, in his text "Recommendations to Physicians Practicing Psycho-Analysis". Such "hovering" attention, as Freud initially put it in 1909 in the case study of Little Hans, was a technical development of "alert passivity" from the more aggressive listening and interpretation of the 1890s, as he turned away from the practice of hypnosis towards the new framework of psychoanalysis.

== Later developments ==
Since Theodor Reik and his 1948 study Listening with the Third Ear, more analytic emphasis has been placed on the dialectic between evenly suspended attention, and the analyst's cognitive working-over of what they hear. The part played by countertransference and by the analyst's role responsiveness has also been highlighted.

== See also ==
- Analytic neutrality
- Negative capability
- W. R. Bion
