= Sandler =

Sandler (Yiddish: סאנדלער, lit. 'sandalmaker') is a Yiddish family name. A rarer variant is Sendler.

== Notable people ==
- Adam Sandler (born 1966), American actor and comedian
- Barry Sandler (born 1947), American screenwriter and film producer
- Boris Sandler (born 1950), Yiddish-language author and journalist
- Catt Sandler, American politician
- Dale Sandler, American epidemiologist
- Ethan Sandler (born 1972), American actor
- Herbert Sandler (1931–2019), American banker
- Irving Sandler (1925–2018), American art critic, art historian, and educator.
- Jackie Sandler (born 1974), American actress and wife of Adam Sandler
- Jonathan Sandler (1982–2012), French rabbi assassinated on March 19, 2012, with his two sons during the 2012 Midi-Pyrénées shootings in Toulouse
- Joseph Sandler (born 1953), Washington, D.C., attorney
- Joseph J. Sandler (1927–1998), British psychoanalyst, President of the International Psychoanalytical Association from 1989 to 1993
- Karen Sandler, attorney
- Karen Sandler (author), American author
- Larry Sandler (1929–1987), American geneticist
- Marion Sandler (1930–2012), former co-CEO of Golden West Financial Corporation and World Savings Bank
- Martin W. Sandler (born 1933), American author, historian, and television producer
- Örjan Sandler (born 1940), Swedish speed skater
- Paul Mark Sandler, Maryland trial lawyer and author
- Philippe Sandler (born 1997), Dutch footballer
- Rickard Sandler (1884–1964), Prime Minister of Sweden (1925–1926)
- Ron Sandler, British banker
- Steven Sandler, American inventor and businessman
- Tony Sandler (born 1933), Belgian singer, entertainer and performer

== See also ==
- Lowenstein Sandler, a New Jersey–based American law firm
