= Sandle =

Sandle is a surname. Notable people with the surname include:

- Michael Sandle (born 1936), British sculptor and artist
- Wes Sandle (1935–2020), New Zealand physicist
- Jennie Formby (née Sandle; born 1960), British trade unionist and politician

== See also ==
- Sandal (disambiguation)
- Sandler (disambiguation)
