= Susan Kavaler-Adler =

Susan Kavaler-Adler (Ph.D., ABPP, NCPsyA, D.Litt.) is an American clinical psychologist, psychoanalyst, object relations theorist, and author. Her contributions to the field of psychoanalysis include developmental mourning, erotic transference, the demon-lover complex, and love and creativity. In 1991, she co-founded, with Dr. Robert Weinstein, the Object Relations Institute for Psychotherapy and Psychoanalysis (ORI) in New York City, which is chartered (since 1993) by the Board of Regents of the NYS Education Department to provide post-graduate training in psychotherapy and psychoanalysis.

== Publications ==
Kavaler-Adler is the author of six influential psychoanalytic books, one trade book, and over 80 published articles and book chapters on clinical psychoanalysis, creativity, psychic regression, mourning, female development, and erotic transference.

=== Books ===
- The Compulsion to Create: Women Writers and Their Demon Lovers
- The Creative Mystique: From Red Shoe Frenzy to Love and Creativity
- Mourning Spirituality and Psychic Change: A New Object Relations View of Psychoanalysis
- Anatomy of Regret: From Death Instinct to Reparation and Symbolization Through Vivid Clinical Cases
- The Klein-Winnicott Dialectic: Transformative New Metapsychology and Interactive Clinical Theory
- Selected Papers by Susan Kavaler-Adler, Volume 1: Developmental Mourning, Erotic Transference, and Object Relations Psychoanalysis
- Saturday Nights at Lafayette Grill: True Tales & Gossips of NY City Argentine Tango Scene

=== Selected Papers ===
- Kavaler-Adler, S. (2018). The beginning of heartache in character disorders: On the way to relatedness and intimacy through primal affects and symbolization. International Forum of Psychoanalysis, 27(4), 207-218. DOI: 10.1080/0803706X.2016.1270468
- Kavaler-Adler, S. (2010). Seduction, date rape, and aborted surrender. International Forum of Psychoanalysis, 19, 15-26.
- Kavaler-Adler, S. (2009). Object relations perspectives on "Phantom of the Opera" and its demon lover theme: The modern film. American Journal of Psychoanalysis 69, 150-166.
- Kavaler-Adler, S. (2007). Pivotal moments of surrender to mourning the parental internal objects. Psychoanalytic Review, 94, 763-789.
- Kavaler-Adler, S. (2006). From neurotic guilt to existential guilt as grief: The road to interiority, agency, and compassion through mourning. Part II. American Journal of Psychoanalysis, 66, 333-350.
- Kavaler-Adler, S. (2006). From neurotic guilt to existential guilt as grief: the road to interiority, agency, and compassion through mourning. Part I. American Journal of Psychoanalysis, 66, 239-260.
- Kavaler-Adler, S. (2005). The case of David: On the couch for sixty minutes, nine years of once-a-week treatment. American Journal of Psychoanalysis, 65 (2), 102-134.
- Kavaler-Adler, S. (2000). The divine, the deviant, and the diabolical: A journey through an artists' paintings during participation in a creative process group; an evolution of "developmental mourning." International Forum of Psychoanalysis, 9, 97-111.
- Kavaler-Adler, S. (1998). Vaginal core or vampire mouth: The visceral level of envy in women; the protosymbolic politics of object relations. In Burke, N. (ed.) Gender and Envy (pp. 221-240). London, UK: Routledge.
- Kavaler-Adler, S. (1995). Women, the instinctual self, and the demon lover. American Journal of Psychoanalysis, 55(1), 74-81.
- Kavaler-Adler, S. (1995). Opening up blocked mourning in the preoedipal character. American Journal of Psychoanalysis, 55 (2), 145-168.
- Kavaler-Adler, S. (1991). Some More Speculations on Anna O. American Journal of Psychoanalysis, 51(2), 161-171.
- Kavaler-Adler, S. (1991). Emily Dickinson and the subject of seclusion. American Journal of Psychoanalysis, 51(1), 21-38.
- Kavaler-Adler, S. (1985). Mirror mirror on the wall ... Journal of Comprehensive Psychotherapy, 5, 1-38.

== Reception ==
=== Book Reviews ===
The Compulsion to Create (1993)

- Wayne, Marc (1995). Review of The Compulsion to Create: A Psychoanalytic Study of Women Artists, by Susan Kavaler-Adler. American Journal of Psychoanalysis 55(4): 394–395.
- Dalsimer, K. (1994). Review of The Compulsion to Create: A Psychoanalytic Study of Women Artists. International Journal of Psychoanalysis 75: 856–859.
- Cox, Murray (1995). Review of The Compulsion to Create: A Psychoanalytic Study of Women Artists. British Journal of Psychiatry.

The Creative Mystique (1996)

- Almond, Barbara (1998). Review of The Creative Mystique: From Red Shoes Frenzy to Love and Creativity. Psychoanalytic Books 9(2): 225–229.
- Erera, P. I. (1998). Review of The Creative Mystique: From Red Shoes Frenzy to Love and Creativity. Psychoanalytic Social Work 5: 90–92.
- Hemmings, Gillian Isaacs (1999). Review of The Creative Mystique: From Red Shoes Frenzy to Love and Creativity. British Journal of Psychotherapy 15(3): 382–384.

Mourning, Spirituality and Psychic Change (2003)

- Lewis, Jeffrey (2005). Review of Mourning, Spirituality and Psychic Change: A New Object Relations View of Psychoanalysis, by Susan Kavaler-Adler. American Journal of Psychoanalysis 65(1): 86–92.

The Anatomy of Regret (2013)

- Alperin, Richard M. (2014). Review of The Anatomy of Regret: From Death Instinct to Reparation and Symbolization Through Vivid Case Studies. American Journal of Psychoanalysis 74(3): 291–292.
- Metzl, Marilyn N. (2014). The Continuum of Mourning. Division Review (11): 4–5.
- Carveth, Donald L. (2017). Review of The Anatomy of Regret: From Death Instinct to Reparation and Symbolization Through Vivid Case Studies. Canadian Journal of Psychoanalysis 25(1): 233–236.

The Klein-Winnicott Dialectic (2014)

- Schwartz, Jack (2016). Review of The Klein-Winnicott Dialectic: Transformative New Metapsychology and Interactive Clinical Theory. American Journal of Psychoanalysis 76(3): 295–298.
- Vorus, Neal (2017). Review of The Klein-Winnicott Dialectic: Transformative New Metapsychology and Interactive Clinical Theory. Psychoanalytic Psychology 34(2): 239–241.

=== Interviews ===
- Culkin, Claire-Madeline (host) (27 June 2016). “The Compulsion to Create: Women Writers and Their Demon Lovers”. New Books Network (podcast).
- Culkin, Claire-Madeline (host) (17 March, 2015). “Susan Kavaler-Adler, Anatomy of Regret (Karnac, 2013)”. New Books Network (podcast).
