= Role suction =

Psychotherapy term

Role suction is a term introduced in the United States by Fritz Redl in the mid-20th century to describe the power of a social group to allocate roles to its members.

W. R. Bion's group dynamics further explored the ways whereby the group (unconsciously) allocates particular functions to particular individuals in order to have its covert emotional needs met; and the process has recently been highlighted anew within the systems-centered therapy of Yvonne Agazarian.

Among regularly occurring group roles are those of the scapegoat for the group's troubles; the joker; the peacemaker; the critic/spokesperson for group standards; the idol, or upholder of the group ideal; and the identified patient. In mixed gender groups, women may be disproportionately pressured by role suction into playing a nurturing/peacemaker role.

== Driving forces ==
The ease whereby people pick out those who play complementary games, and the psychological splitting of good and bad help fuel such role differentiation.

Behind role suction, such forces as projective identification and countertransference have been singled out as operating at an unconscious level in the group.

Role lock – confirming mutual suction into complementary roles, such as victim and abuser – is ensured by the intermeshing of projective identifications.

== Wider systems ==
The British anti-psychiatrists explored the theme of group suction in connection with role attribution in the family nexus, as well as with the allocations of roles in the wider social system, David Cooper suggesting that 'there are always good or bad, loved or hated 'mothers' and 'fathers', older or younger 'brothers' and 'sisters'...in any institutional structure”.

A wider variety of roles can however be found in organizational life, the person-in-role acting as a container for the (unconscious) group forces.

== Role of the therapist ==
Bion has described his experience as a group therapist when he "feels he is being manipulated so as to be playing a part, no matter how difficult to recognize, in somebody else's phantasy...a temporary loss of insight, a sense of experiencing strong feelings, and at the same time a belief that their existence is quite adequately justified by the objective situation". Bion's work has also been used to illustrate the part played by role suction in the selection of group leaders – dependent groups favouring narcissistic leaders, the fight/flight group paranoids.

R. D. Laing considered that a central part of the therapist's job was "not to allow himself to collude with the patients in adopting a position in their phantasy-system: and, alternatively, not to use the patients to embody any phantasy of their own" – to resist role suction. Later therapists however have explored how a measure of adaptation to patients' role suction – a degree of role responsiveness – can be a useful element in the therapeutic use of the countertransference.

== Criticism ==
From the point of view of systems centered therapy, the debate relates to the interface between a personal system and the psycho-dynamics of social systems themselves.

Debate has arisen about how far the group imposes roles, and how far the individual's own personality goes to meet the group halfway. Earl Hopper has used the term personification to challenge Redl's concept, suggesting instead that group roles reflect the underlying personality of the individual involved. However, Kibel objects that in many cases the roles imposed are in fact ego-dystonic; with others pointing to how personal tendencies combine with group expectations with varying degrees of fit.

== See also ==
- Deference
- Division of labor
- Dominant narrative
- Exploitation of labour
- Foreclosure
- Golem effect
- Karpman drama triangle
- Kyriarchy
- Labelling
- Normative social influence
- Objectification
- Peer pressure
- Persona (psychology)
- Positive disintegration
- Role engulfment
- Self-estrangement
- Slut-shaming
- Social alienation
- Social integration
- Stereotyping
