= Psychological resistance =

Phenomenon in clinical psychology

Psychological resistance, also known as psychological resistance to change, is a phenomenon in clinical psychology and counseling psychology in which patients either directly or indirectly exhibit paradoxical opposing behaviors in presumably a clinically initiated push and pull of a change process. In other words, the concept of psychological resistance is that patients are likely to resist physician suggestions to change behavior or accept certain treatments regardless of whether that change will improve their condition. It impedes the development of authentic, reciprocally nurturing experiences in a clinical setting. Psychological resistance can manifest in various ways, such as denying the existence or severity of a problem, rationalizing or minimizing one's responsibility for it, rejecting or distrusting the therapist's or consultant's suggestions, withholding or distorting information, or sabotaging the treatment process.

According to Edward and Faith Teyber, a common source of resistances and defenses is shame. This and similar negative attitudes may be the result of social stigmatization of a particular condition, such as psychological resistance towards insulin treatment of diabetes.

Examples of psychological resistance may include perfectionism, criticizing, disrespectful attitude, being self-critical, preoccupation with appearance, social withdrawal, need to be seen as independent and invulnerable, or an inability to accept compliments or constructive criticism. Resistance can be very high, such as inducing conflict, or low such as conceding to everything.

== Origins and Theoretical Background ==
The concept of resistance was first introduced by Sigmund Freud, who described it as an unconscious process in which patients defend against the emergence of anxiety-provoking thoughts or feelings. In classical psychoanalytic theory, resistance was considered a key barrier to free association and insight. Later theorists, such as Anna Freud and Wilhelm Reich, elaborated its forms and links to defense mechanisms. Modern approaches, including psychodynamic, cognitive-behavioral, and humanistic models, interpret resistance more broadly as a natural response to perceived threat or loss of control.

== Types of Resistance ==
Scholars have described multiple forms of resistance, commonly categorized as:

- Realistic resistance: Rational or conscious opposition based on genuine disagreement with the therapist’s approach or perceived irrelevance of treatment.
- Interpersonal resistance: Relational behaviors such as withdrawal, compliance without engagement, or hostility, often reflecting underlying dynamics within the therapeutic alliance.
- Trait vs. state resistance: Trait resistance refers to a stable disposition toward autonomy or reactance, while state resistance is context-dependent, emerging from specific situations or perceived threats.

These distinctions help clinicians differentiate between functional self-protection and nonadaptive avoidance, informing careful tailored interventions.

== Contemporary understandings ==
=== Realistic resistance ===
Realistic resistance is the understanding of the conscious and deliberate aspect of psychological resistance in therapeutic treatment. "Realistic resistance refers to clients' conscious, deliberate opposition to therapeutic initiatives that they fail to understand or accept". There are several things an individual may disagree with in the therapy setting that can lead to realistic psychological resistance, such as general therapeutic technique or words and phrases utilized by a physician or therapist.

Realistic resistance can be identified by behavioral markers. Some examples include avoidance of certain lines of questioning, outright refusal to cooperate, and sudden loss of effort and interest during sessions. Realistic resistance can have negative consequences for the therapeutic process and outcome, such as reducing client engagement, motivation, and adherence to treatment. Therefore, it is important for therapists to identify the above mentioned behavioral markers to address realistic resistance in a collaborative and empathic manner.

==== Strategies to address realistic resistance ====
To manage realistic resistance, it is important to ensure that the client is kept in the loop which can be done by explaining the rationale and evidence for the therapeutic approach and techniques. This could be achieved by inviting feedback and questions from the client. Additionally, therapists often use motivational interviewing techniques to elicit the client's reasons for change, explore ambivalence, and enhance self-efficacy. Adapting the language and style of communication to match the client's preferences, needs, and level of understanding as well as involving the client in setting goals and choosing interventions, and offering choices and alternatives when possible also helps validate the client's feelings, thereby lowering the resistance. These strategies help in reframing resistance as a sign of strength, and highlighting the client's autonomy and responsibility for change.

=== Interpersonal resistance ===
Resistance is based on instinctively autonomous ways of reacting in which clients both reveal and keep hidden aspects of themselves from the therapist or another person. These behaviors occur mostly during therapy, in interaction with the therapist. It is a way of avoiding and yet expressing unacceptable drives, feelings, fantasies, and behavior patterns.

Examples of causes of resistance include: resistance to the recognition of feelings, fantasies, and motives; resistance to revealing feelings toward the therapist; resistance as a way of demonstrating self-sufficiency; resistance as clients' reluctance to change their behavior outside the therapy room; resistance as a consequence of failure of empathy on the part of the therapist.

Examples of the expression of resistance are canceling or rescheduling appointments, avoiding consideration of identified themes, forgetting to complete homework assignments, and the like. This will make it more difficult for the therapist to work with the client, but it will also provide him with information about the client.

==== Strategies to manage Interpersonal Resistance ====
Some strategies that can help therapists deal with interpersonal resistance include exploring the meaning and function of the resistance for the client, and how it relates to their interpersonal patterns and goals. Providing feedback and interpretation about the resistance and its impact on the therapy relationship, and inviting the client's response and perspective. Using empathy and validation to acknowledge the client's feelings and concerns, and to convey understanding and acceptance. Using humor and paradox to defuse tension and challenge the client's assumptions or behaviors in a non-threatening way. Negotiating and compromising with the client about the pace, direction, and focus of therapy, and respecting their autonomy and preferences. By using these strategies, therapists can reduce interpersonal resistance and enhance the therapeutic relationship with their clients, which can facilitate change and improve outcomes.

=== State and trait resistance (situational and characteristic) ===
Resistance is an automatic and unconscious process. According to Van Denburg and Kiesler, it can be either for a certain period of time (state resistance) but it can also be a manifestation of more longstanding traits or character (trait resistance).

Trait resistance refers to the stable tendency to resist change or challenge, regardless of the situation or the content of therapy. Both state and trait resistance can interfere with the therapeutic alliance, the client's engagement, and the client's progress.

In psychotherapy, state resistance can occur at a certain moment, when an anxiety-provoking experience is triggered. Trait resistance, on the other hand, repeatedly occurs during sessions and interferes with the task of therapy. The client shows a pattern of off-task behaviors that makes the therapist experience some level of negative emotion and cognition against the client. Therefore the maladaptive pattern of interpersonal behavior and the therapist's response interfere with the task or process of therapy. This 'state resistance' is cumulative during sessions and its development can best be prevented by empathic interventions on the therapist's part.

Outside therapy, trait resistance in a client is demonstrated by distinctive patterns of interpersonal behavior, which are often caused by typical patterns of communication with significant others, like family, friends, and partners.

==== Strategies to manage State and Trait Resistance ====
Some strategies that can help therapists cope with state and trait resistance include matching the therapeutic approach and techniques to the client's level of resistance, readiness for change, and preferred mode of coping; using cognitive restructuring techniques to challenge the client's irrational beliefs, cognitive distortions, or self-defeating thoughts that contribute to resistance; using exposure techniques to help the client face their fears, anxieties, or discomforts that underlie resistance, and using paradoxical techniques to use the client's resistance as a therapeutic tool, such as prescribing the symptom, reframing the problem, or exaggerating the consequences.

=== Handling resistance in psychotherapy ===
Nowadays many therapists work with resistance as a way to understand the client better. They emphasize the importance to work with the resistance and not against it. This is because working against the resistance of a client can result in a counterproductive relationship with the therapist; the more attention is drawn to the resistance, the less productive the therapy. Working with the resistance provides a positive working relationship and gives the therapist information about the unconscious of the client.

A therapist can use countertransference as a tool to understand the client's resistance. The feelings the client evokes in the therapist with his/her resistance will give you a hint what the resistance is about. For example, a very directive client can make the therapist feel very passive. When the therapist pays attention to their passive feelings, it can make him/her understand this behavior of the client as resistance coming from fear of losing control.

It can also be useful to identify resistance with the client. This can not only work towards addressing the issue but can also allow the client to think about and discuss their resistance and the cognitive processes that underlie it. In this way, the client takes an active involvement in their therapy, which may reduce resistance in the future. It also helps the client's ability to identify their resistance in the future and respond to it.

Relevant to the question of treatment planning are research studies that have looked at resistance traits as indicators and contra-indicators for different types of interventions. Beutler, Moleiro, and Talebi reviewed 20 studies that inspected the differential effects of therapist directiveness as moderated by client resistance and found that 80% (n=16) of the studies demonstrated that directive interventions were most productive among clients who had relatively low levels of state or trait-like resistance. In contrast, nondirective interventions worked best among clients who had relatively high levels of resistance. These findings provide strong support for the value of resistance level as a predictor of treatment outcome, as well as treatment-planning. In these studies cognitive behavioral therapy has been used as a prototype for directive therapy and psychodynamic, self-directed, or other relation oriented therapy have been used as a prototype for non-directive treatment.

== Behavioral models of resistance ==
Behavior analytic and social learning models of resistance focus on the setting events, antecedents, and consequences for resistant behavior to understand the function of the behavior. At least five behavioral models of resistance exist. These models share many common features. The most explored research model, with more than ten years of support, is the model created by Gerald Patterson for resistance in parent training. With supporting research, this model has even been extended to consultation.

Patterson's suggested intervention of 'struggle with and work through' is often contrasted as an intervention with motivational interviewing. In motivational interviewing, the therapist does not attempt to prompt the client back to the problem area but reinforces the occurrence when it comes up as opposed to 'struggling with and working through' where the therapist directly guides the client back to the problem. Behavior analytic models can accommodate both interventions, as pointed out by Cautilli and colleagues depending on the function and what needs to be accomplished in the treatment.

== Measurement and assessment ==
Researchers have developed several tools to evaluate resistance, such as the Therapeutic Reactance Scale and Resistance Scale for Psychotherapy. These instruments aim to distinguish trait reactance (general autonomy striving) from situational resistance during therapy. Behavioral indicators like missed sessions, topic shifts, or counterargument frequency are also used in observational coding systems.

However, empirical validation remains limited, and critics note that measurement may confuse disagreement with dysfunction, raising concerns about clinician bias.

== See also ==
- Decisional balance sheet
- Immunity to change
- Motivational salience
- Negative therapeutic reaction
- Psychological dependence
- Resistance (creativity)
- Resistance (psychoanalysis) § Criticisms – Criticism of misuse of the concept of resistance
