= Jerry Cleaver =

American writing teacher

- Born: March 30, 1938
- Died: March 29, 2014 (aged 75)
- Occupation: Writing Teacher
- Writing career
- Notable work: Immediate Fiction

Gerald "Jerry" Cleaver (March 30, 1938 – March 29, 2014) was an American writing teacher and author best known for his book Immediate Fiction: A Complete Writing Course (2002), an instructional guide on fiction writing and storytelling. Cleaver is also known as the founder of The Writer’s Loft, an independent writing workshop based in Chicago, Illinois.

== Career ==
Since 1968, Cleaver worked as a writing instructor and story coach, focusing on the craft of fiction, screenwriting, and dramatic structure. He taught a writing workshop for 10 years at Northwestern University and then founded the Writer’s Loft in Chicago, where he taught workshops on narrative technique and the creative process. His teaching emphasized practical storytelling principles, especially the relationship between character desire, conflict, and action. By the time of his death, the students of his workshop had published over forty novels.

In addition to his classroom teaching, Cleaver conducted seminars for writers and developed online writing courses, including the “Write Your Novel Now” program. Cleaver also gave special seminars for Writer's Digest.

He also held a two-week book tour in Beijing and Shanghai in 2012, during which he lectured at major universities.

== Immediate Fiction ==
Cleaver’s best-known work, Immediate Fiction: A Complete Writing Course, was first published in 2002 by St. Martin’s Press. The book presents a structured approach to writing fiction and covers topics such as story construction, characterization, point of view, revision, time management, and overcoming writer’s block.

Cleaver argues that all effective stories are built around three essential elements: “want,” “obstacle,” and “action.” He also emphasizes visualization and emotional identification as central tools of fiction writing.

== Teaching philosophy ==
Cleaver’s approach to storytelling stressed momentum, emotional engagement, and concrete dramatic conflict. His instruction often focused on helping writers develop productive habits and complete drafts quickly before revising. He described storytelling as a fundamental human need tied to identification and emotional experience.

== Legacy and influence ==
Immediate Fiction became popular among aspiring novelists and creative writing students for its direct and accessible teaching style. The book has remained influential in creative writing circles and is frequently recommended in discussions of practical fiction-writing guides. The book has been praised for its emphasis on actionable techniques and its applicability to novels, short stories, screenplays, and stage plays.

As of 2014, more than forty published novels and works of non-fiction had emerged from Cleaver's writing workshop, The Writer's Loft.

Cleaver became known in China through the translation of his book Immediate Fiction, which was published by China Renmin University Press. This sparked media coverage, including multiple articles and interviews.

== Bibliography ==
- Cleaver, Jerry (2002). Immediate Fiction: A Complete Writing Course (1nd ed.). New York: St. Martin’s Press. ISBN 978-0-312-28716-0.
