= Identification (psychology) =

Psychological process

Identification is a psychological process where the individual assimilates an aspect, property, or attribute of the other and is transformed wholly or partially by the model that other provides. It is by means of a series of identifications that the personality is constituted and specified. The roots of the concept can be found in Freud's writings. The three most prominent concepts of identification as described by Freud are: primary identification, narcissistic (secondary) identification and partial (secondary) identification.

While "in the psychoanalytic literature there is agreement that the core meaning of identification is simple – to be like or to become like another", it has also been adjudged "'the most perplexing clinical/theoretical area' in psychoanalysis".

== Freud ==
Freud first raised the matter of identification (German: Identifizierung) in 1897, in connection with the illness or death of one's parents, and the response "to punish oneself in a hysterical fashion...with the same states [of illness] that they have had. The identification which occurs here is, as we can see, nothing other than a mode of thinking". The question was taken up again psychoanalytically in Ferenczi's article "Introjection and Transference" (1909), but it was in the decade between "On Narcissism" (1914) and "The Ego and the Id" (1923) that Freud made his most detailed and intensive study of the concept.

Freud distinguished three main kinds of identification. "First, identification is the original form of emotional tie with an object; secondly, in a regressive way it becomes a substitute for a libidinal object-tie...and thirdly, it may arise with any new perception of a common quality which is shared with some other person".

=== Primary identification ===
Primary identification is the original and primitive form of emotional attachment to something or someone prior to any relations with other persons or objects: "an individual's first and most important identification, his identification with the father in his own personal prehistory...with the parents". This means that when a baby is born he is not capable of making a distinction between himself and important others. The baby has an emotional attachment with his parents and experiences his parents as a part of himself. "The breast is part of me, I am the breast."

During this process of identification children adopt unconsciously the characteristics of their parents and begin to associate themselves with and copy the behavior of their parents. Freud remarked that identification should be distinguished from imitation, which is a voluntary and conscious act. Because of this process of emotional attachment a child will develop a super ego that has similarities to the moral values and guidelines by which the parents live their lives. By this process children become a great deal like their parents and this facilitates learning to live in the world and culture to which they are born.

"By and large, psychoanalysts grant the importance and centrality of primary identification, even though...the concept varies 'according to each author and his ideas, its meaning in consequence being far from precise' (Etchegoyen 1985)".

=== Narcissistic (secondary) identification ===
Narcissistic identification is the form of identification following abandonment or loss of an object. This experience of loss starts at a very young age. In "Mourning and Melancholia" Freud, having "shown that identification is a preliminary stage of object-choice", argued that the experience of loss sets in motion a regressive process that "served to establish an identification of the ego with the abandoned object". In "The Ego and the Id", he went on to maintain that "this kind of substitution has a great share in determining the form taken by the ego and that it makes an essential contribution towards building up what is called its 'character'".

Jacques Lacan, in his theory of the Imaginary, developed the latter point, describing the ego as being "constituted in its nucleus by a series of alienating identifications" – part of his opposition to any concept of an "autonomous" and conflict-free ego.

=== Partial (secondary) identification ===
Partial identification is based on the perception of a special quality of another person. This quality or ideal is often represented in a "leader figure" who is identified with. For example: the young boy identifies with the strong muscles of an older neighbour boy. Next to identification with the leader, people identify with others because they feel they have something in common. For example: a group of people who like the same music. This mechanism plays an important role in the formation of groups. It contributes to the development of character and the ego is formed by identification with a group (group norms). Partial identification promotes the social life of persons who will be able to identify with one another through this common bond to one another, instead of considering someone as a rival.

=== Partial identification and empathy ===
Freud went on to indicate the way "a path leads from identification by way of imitation to empathy, that is, to the comprehension of the mechanism by which we are enabled to take up any attitude at all towards another mental life". Otto Fenichel would go on to emphasize how "trial identifications for the purposes of empathy play a basic part in normal object relationships. They can be studied especially in analyzing the psychoanalyst's ways of working". Object relations theory would subsequently highlight the use of "trial identification with the patient in the session" as part of the growing technique of analysing from the countertransference.

== Anna Freud and identification with the aggressor ==
In her classic book The Ego and the Mechanism of Defence, Anna Freud introduced "two original defence mechanisms...both of which have become classics of ego psychology", the one being altruistic surrender, the other identification with the aggressor. Anna Freud pointed out that identification with parental values was a normal part of the development of the superego; but that "if the child introjects both rebuke and punishment and then regularly projects this same punishment on another, 'then he is arrested at an intermediate stage in the development of the superego'".

The concept was also taken up in object relations theory, which particularly explored "how a patient sometimes places the analyst in the role of victim whilst the patient acts out an identification with the aggressor" in the analytic situation.

== With the analyst ==
Mainstream analytic thought broadly agrees that interpretation took effect "by utilizing positive transference and transitory identifications with the analyst". More controversial, however, was the concept of "the terminal identification" at the close of analysis, where "that with which the patient identifies is their strong ego...[or] identification with the analyst's superego".

Lacan took strong exception to "any analysis that one teaches as having to be terminated by identification with the analyst...There is a beyond to this identification...this crossing of the plane of identification". Most Lacanians have subsequently echoed his distrust of "the view of psychoanalysis that relies on identification with the analyst as a central curative factor". How far the same criticism applies, however, to those who see as a positive therapeutic result "the development of a self-analytic attitude...[built on] identification with and internalization of the analyst's analytic attitude" is not perhaps quite clear.

Marion Milner has argued that "terminal identification" can be most acute in those analysands who go on to become therapists themselves: "by the mere fact of becoming analysts we have succeeded in bypassing an experience which our patients have to go through. We have chosen to identify with our analyst's profession and to act out that identification".

== In psychoanalytic thinking today ==
Much has been written on identification since Freud. Identification has been seen both as a normal developmental mechanism and as a mechanism of defence. Many types of identification have been described by other psychoanalysts, including counter-identification (Fliess, 1953), pseudoidentification (Eidelberg, 1938), concordant and complementary identifications (Racker, 1957), and adhesive identification (Bick, 1968): "the work of Bick and others on adhesive identification, exploring the concept of the 'psychic skin' ".

== See also ==
- Empathy
- Other, a key concept in continental philosophy
- Projective identification
- Social influence
- Transportation theory (psychology)
