= Working through =

Psychodynamic psychotherapy technique

In psychodynamic psychotherapy, working through is seen as the process of repeating, elaborating, and amplifying interpretations. It is believed that such working through is critical to the success of therapy.

The concept was introduced by Sigmund Freud in 1914, and assumed ever greater importance in psychoanalysis, in contrast to the immediacy of abreaction.

== Interpretation and resistance ==
Interpretations are made when the client comes up with some material, be it written, a piece of art, music, or verbal, and are intended to bring the material offered into connection with the unconscious mind. Because of psychological resistance to accepting the unconscious, interpretations, whether correct or partially incorrect, consciously accepted or rejected, will inevitably require amplifying and extending to other aspects of the client's life.

In a process Sandor Rado compared to the labour of mourning, the unconscious content must be demonstrated repeatedly in all its various forms and linkages—the process of working through.

Because of the power of resistance, the client's rational thought and conscious awareness may not be sufficient on their own to overcome the maladjustment, entailing further interpretation and further working through.

=== Rat Man ===
Before formulating the concept of working through, in his case study of the Rat Man, Freud wrote of his interpretations:

It is never the aim of discussions like these to create convictions. They are only intended to bring the repressed complexes into consciousness...and to facilitate the emergence of fresh material from the unconscious. A sense of conviction is only attained after the patient has himself worked over the reclaimed material.

== Transference ==
The necessity of working through the transference is stressed in almost all forms of psychodynamic therapy, from object relations theory, through the openings offered for working through by transference disruption in self psychology, to the repetitive exploration of the transference in group therapy.

== Cultural analogues ==
Jacques Lacan compared the process of working-through to the stylistic recommendations of Boileau: "Cent fois sur the métier, remettez...A hundred times consider what you've said"(Pope).

== See also ==
- Psychodynamic psychotherapy
- Free association
