= Rat Man =

Patient of Sigmund Freud

"Rat Man" was the nickname given by Sigmund Freud to a patient whose "case history" was published as Bemerkungen über einen Fall von Zwangsneurose ["Notes Upon a Case of Obsessional Neurosis"] (1909). This was the second of six case histories that Freud published and the first in which he claimed that the patient had been cured by psychoanalysis.

The nickname derives from the fact that among the patient's many compulsions was an obsession with nightmarish fantasies about rats.

To protect the anonymity of patients, psychoanalytic case studies usually withheld or disguised the names of the individuals concerned (Anna O., Little Hans, Wolf Man, Dora, etc.). Recent researchers have determined that the "Rat Man" was in fact a lawyer named Ernst Lanzer (1878–1914)—though many other sources maintain that the man's name was Paul Lorenz.

== History of the analysis ==
Lanzer first came to Freud in October 1907 complaining of obsessive fears and compulsive impulses. Freud treated his patient for a little over three months on a regular daily basis. The treatment was irregular for the next three months and sporadic, at best, after that.

Lanzer's principal fear was that something terrible was going to happen to his father and a female friend (who later became his wife). His fear had grown out of an account he heard from a fellow army officer concerning a Chinese torture method in which a large pot containing a live rat was strapped to the buttocks of the victim, and the rat, encouraged by a red-hot poker, would gnaw its way out through the victim's anus.

Lanzer claimed that he fantasized about murder and suicide, and he developed a number of compulsive irrational behavior patterns. For example, he mentioned his habit of opening the door to his flat between 12 midnight and 1:00 A.M., apparently so that his father's ghost could enter. Lanzer would then stare at his penis, sometimes using a mirror.

Freud encouraged Lanzer to discuss details of his sex life (such as his first efforts at masturbation at age 21) and focused on a number of verbal associations with the word "Ratten" ("rats").

Lanzer introduced Freud to Friedrich Nietzsche's phrase (which Freud later cited) "'I did this,' says my Memory. 'I cannot have done this,' says my Pride, and remains inexorable. In the end – Memory yields." Freud retold the saying more than once, and it was used by later therapists such as Fritz Perls.

Lanzer broke off his analysis with Freud after a relatively brief period and well before his transference had been fully resolved. Just after Freud had completed the written version of the case history in October 1909, he confessed to Carl Jung that his patient was having ongoing problems. Lanzer was killed in World War I, and later researchers were unable to interview him.

== Freud's write-up: "Notes Upon a Case of Obsessional Neurosis" ==
Freud was led to publish the Rat Man case history because he was feeling pressured to show the world that psychoanalysis could achieve successful therapeutic results. Because the Rat Man previously consulted Julius von Wagner-Jauregg, Freud's eminent psychiatric colleague at the University of Vienna, the case was a particularly critical test of Freud's therapeutic abilities. Before October 1908, when he communicated this case history at the first International Psychoanalytic Congress in Salzburg, Austria, Freud had yet to publish the results of a successful psychoanalysis.

The case study was published in 1909 in Germany. Freud saw the Rat Man patient for some six months despite later claiming the treatment lasted about a year. He considered the treatment a success.

The patient presented with obsessional thoughts and with behaviors that he felt compelled to carry out, which had been precipitated by the loss/replacement of his pince-nez and the problem of paying for them, combined with the impact of a story he heard from a fellow officer about a torture wherein rats would eat their way into the anal cavity of the victim. The patient then felt a compulsion to imagine that this fate was befalling two people dear to him, specifically his father and his fiancée. The irrational nature of this obsession is revealed by the fact that the man had the greatest regard for his fiancée and that his revered father had been dead for some years. Freud theorized that these obsessive ideas and similar thoughts were produced by conflicts consisting of the combination of loving and aggressive impulses relating to the people concerned – what Eugen Bleuler later called ambivalence.

The Rat Man often defended himself against his own thoughts. He had had a secret thought that he wished his father would die so he could inherit all of his money and become rich enough to marry, before shaming himself by fantasizing that his father would die and leave him nothing. The patient even goes so far as to fantasize about marrying Freud's daughter, believing (Freud writes) that "the only reason I was so kind and incredibly patient with him was that I wanted to have him for a son-in-law" – a matter linked in the transference to his conflicts between his mother's wish for him to marry rich like his father and his fiancée's poverty.

In addition, the symptoms were believed to keep the patient from needing to make difficult decisions in his current life, and to ward off the anxiety that would be involved in experiencing angry and aggressive impulses directly. The patient's older sister and father had died, and these losses were considered, along with his suicidal thoughts and his tendency, to form part of the tissue of phantasies, verbal associations and symbolic meanings in which he was trapped. Freud believed that they had their origin in the Rat Man's sexual experiences of infancy, in particular harsh punishment for childhood masturbation, and the vicissitudes of sexual curiosity.

In the theoretical second part of the case study, Freud elaborates on such defence mechanisms as rationalization, doubt, undoing and displacement.

In a later footnote, Freud laments that although "the patient's mental health was restored to him by the analysis ... like so many young men of value and promise, he perished in the Great War".

A number of significant discrepancies between the published case history and Freud's process notes, which were discovered among his papers after his death, have been pointed out by Patrick Mahony. According to Mahony, who is an analyst and sympathetic to the general goals of psychoanalysis, Freud's published case history is "muddled" and "inconsistent" on various matters of fact and also exhibits "glaring" omissions of information. In particular, there is an overemphasis on the father to the exclusion of the mother. Mahony states "Freud mixed momentous insights with exaggerated claims," some of which "were made in his zeal to protect and promote a new discipline."

== Legacy ==
Jacques Lacan built his early structuralist theory around the Rat Man case, in particular the polarity of father–rich wife/son–poor wife as an intergenerational force creating the individual neurosis.

Freud's late note upon the Rat Man's acute sense of smell would later be developed into his theory of the process of civilisation and organic repression.

== Criticism of Freud ==
Peter Gay concluded in Freud: A Life for Our Time (1988) that "apart from a handful of interesting deviations, the case history Freud published generally followed the process notes he made every night". Patrick Mahony, a psychoanalyst and professor of English at the University of Montreal, has highlighted such discrepancies in his detailed study Freud and the Rat Man, published in 1986 by the Yale University Press.

Dr. Mahony said Freud seems to have consistently implied that the case lasted longer than it actually did. He also said Freud claimed in a lecture to be able to guess the name of the Rat Man's girlfriend, Gisela, from an anagram, Glejisamen, which the patient had invented. Actually, the notes show Freud had learned her name first, and then used it to deduce the meaning of the anagram, although in the actual case study Freud merely states that "when he told it to me, I could not help noticing that the word was in fact an anagram of the name of his lady".

Critics have objected to Freud's downplaying of the role of the Rat Man's mother, and for several deviations on his part from what later became standard psychoanalytic practice.

=== Efficacy of the treatment ===
Mahoney accepted that Freud obtained a degree of success in restoring his patient to functional life, though he considered Freud exaggerated the extent of this in his case study. Others have suggested that by concentrating on building rapport with his patient, at the expense of analyzing the negative transference, Freud merely achieved a temporary transference cure. Lacan for his part concluded that although he did not "regard the Rat Man as a case that Freud cured", in it "Freud made the fundamental discoveries, which we are still living off, concerning the dynamics and structure of obsessional neurosis".

In a letter Freud wrote to Jung, shortly after publication of the case study, he claimed of the Rat Man that "he is facing life with courage and ability. The one point that still gives him trouble (father-complex and transference) has shown up clearly in my conversations with this intelligent and grateful man" – a not insignificant reservation. But while Freud in the case-history had certainly claimed that "the patient's rat delirium had disappeared", he had also pointed out the limited time and depth of the analysis: "The patient recovered, and his ordinary life began to assert its claims...which were incompatible with a continuation of the treatment".

As the average length of time expected of an analysis increased from months to years over the 20th century, so too the success of the Rat Man's case has perhaps come to resemble rather the symptomatic relief of brief psychotherapy or focal psychotherapy, more than the achievement of a full psychoanalysis.
