= Sandler (disambiguation) =

Sandler may refer to:

- Sandler (surname)
- Lowenstein Sandler, corporate law firm
- Sandler O'Neill and Partners, New York City-based investment banking firm
- Sandler and Young, singing team from the 1960s to the '80s with Tony Sandler and Ralph Young
- Sandler Award, genetics dissertation award
