= Body-centred countertransference =

Experience in psychotherapy

Body-centred countertransference involves a psychotherapist's experiencing the physical state of the patient in a clinical context. Also known as somatic countertransference, it can incorporate the therapist's gut feelings, as well as changes to breathing, to heart rate and to tension in muscles.

== Various approaches ==
Dance therapy has understandably given much weight to the concept of somatic countertransference. Jungian James Hillman also emphasised the importance of the therapist using the body as a sounding-board in the clinical context.

Post-Reichian therapies like bioenergetic analysis have also stressed the role of the body-centered countertransference.

There is some evidence that those suffering from borderline personality disorder and narcissistic personality disorder create more intense embodied countertransferences in their therapists, their personalities favouring such non-verbal communication by impact over more verbalised, less somatic interactions.

== Orbach ==
Susie Orbach has written emotively of what she described as "wildcat sensations in my own body...a wildcat countertransference" in the context of body countertransference. She details her role responsiveness to one patient who evoked in her what she called "an unfamiliar body experience...this purring, reliable and solid body" to counterbalance the fragmented body image of the patient herself.

== The Irish experience ==
=== In female trauma therapists ===
Irish psychologists at NUI Galway and University College Dublin have begun to measure body-centred countertransference in female trauma therapists using their 'Egan and Carr Body-Centred Countertransference Scale' (2005), a sixteen symptom measure.

Their research was influenced by developments in the psychotherapy world which was beginning to see a therapist's role in a therapeutic dyad as reflexive; that a therapist uses their bodies and 'self' as a tuning fork to understand their client's internal experience and to use this attunement as another way of being empathic with a client's internal world. Pearlman and Saakvitne's seminal book on vicarious traumatization and the effect of trauma work on therapists has also been an important directional model for all researchers studying the physical effects of trauma work on a therapist.

High levels of body-centred countertransference have since been found in both Irish female trauma therapists and clinical psychologists. This phenomenon is also known as 'somatic countertransference' or 'embodied countertransference' and it links to how mirror neurons might lead to 'unconscious automatic somatic countertransference' as a result of postural mirroring by the therapist.

Hamilton et al (2020) revisited BCT in a larger sample of 175 therapists (122 females). A similar pattern of body-centred countertransference was reported, as in the previous two studies. The most common being: (a) Muscle Tension- 81%, (b) Tearfulness- 78%, (c) Sleepiness- 72%, (d) Yawning- 69%, (e) Throat constriction- 46%, (f) Headache- 43%, (g) Stomach disturbance- 43%, (h) Unexpectedly shifting in body 29%, (i) sexual arousal- 29%, (j) raised voice- 28%, (k) aches in joints- 26%, (l) nausea- 24%, (m) Dizziness- 20%, and (n) Genital pain-7.5%. The authors reported how previous researchers did not find BCT, because surveys have previously failed to ask specifically about it, and have focused on emotional and cognitive and relational CT. The authors called for larger longitudinal studies and larger sample sizes, to allow a comparison of gender and orientation effects, as well as whether higher levels affect levels of burnout and therapeutic engagement and treatment outcomes.

Loughran (2002) found that 38 therapists out of 40 who had responded to a questionnaire (which was distributed to a sample of 124 therapists) on a therapist's use of body as a medium for transference and countertransference communication reported that they had experienced bodily sensations (nausea or churning stomach, sleepiness, shakiness, heart palpitations, sexual excitement, etc.) while in session with patients.

=== Frequency of symptom occurrence ===
A list of the frequency of occurrence of body-centred countertransference symptoms reported by trauma therapists (Sample A: 35 Female Irish Trauma therapists) and Irish clinical psychologists (Sample B: 87 Irish Clinical Psychologists) in the previous six months 'when in-session with a client' is given below in order of frequency:

1. Sleepiness (A; 92%, B; 76%)
2. Muscle Tension (A; 83%, B; 79%)
3. Yawning (A; 65%, B; 77%)
4. Unexpected shift in body (A; 77%, B; 57%)
5. Tearfulness (A; 71%, B; 61%)
6. Headache (A; 54%, B; 53%)
7. Stomach Disturbance (A; 41%, B; 46%)
8. Throat Constriction (A; 34%, B; 36%)
1. Raised Voice (A; 29%, B; 33%)
2. Dizziness (A; 26%, B; 19%)
3. Loss of voice (A; 32%, B; 18%)
4. Aches in joints (A; 37%, B; 18%)
5. Nausea (A; 23%, B; 18%)
6. Numbness (A; 29%, B; 15%)
7. Sexual Arousal (A; 26%, B; 11%)
8. Genital pain (A; 6%, B; 2%)

=== Somatization ===
A small but significant relationship was found between female trauma therapists' level of body-centred countertransference and number of sick leave days taken, suggesting a possible relationship between uncensored body-centred countertransference and somatization. This relationship was not however found in clinical psychologists who were working mainly with a non-trauma population. Therapists have noted the connection between a tendency for some clients to express emotional discomfort by focusing on bodily symptoms rather than being able to put their emotional distress into words. It is thought that such processes are more common in people who have experienced childhood abuse and trauma.

Recent research which measured female genital arousal in response to rape cues found that women when listening to rape, consensual sexual activity or violence developed genital arousal more frequently than men. It also might explain the relatively frequent reported experience of sexual arousal amongst Irish female trauma therapists. Further validation of body-centred countertransference in psychologists and therapists is on-going in both NUI Galway and Trinity College Dublin.

== Cautions ==
Therapists have been warned against assuming too automatically that their body-feelings always involve somatic resonance to the client, as opposed to being produced from their own feelings/experiences - the same problem appearing with countertransference generally.

== See also ==
- Acting in
- Alexithymia
- Analytic neutrality
- Burnout
- Compassion fatigue
- Hysterical contagion
- Mass psychogenic illness
- Posttraumatic stress disorder
- Somatization disorder
- Therapeutic relationship
- Traumatology
