= Rat torture =

Torture involving rats

Rat torture is the use of rats to torture a victim by encouraging them to attack and eat the victim alive.

== History ==
The "Rats Dungeon", or "Dungeon of the Rats", was a feature of the Tower of London alleged by Catholic writers from the Elizabethan era. "A cell below high-water mark and totally dark" would draw in rats from the River Thames as the tide flowed in. Prisoners would have their "alarm excited" and in some instances, have "flesh ... torn from the arms and legs".

During the Dutch Revolt, Diederik Sonoy, an ally of William the Silent, is documented to have placed a pottery bowl filled with rats open-side down on the naked body of a prisoner. When hot charcoal was piled on the bowl, the rats would "gnaw into the very bowels of the victim" in an attempt to escape the heat.

Rat torture appears in one of the case studies of Sigmund Freud. The Rat Man obsessed that his father and lady friend would be subjected to this torture.

Several South American military dictatorships used rat torture: in Brazil during the military dictatorship of 1964–1985, in Uruguay during the civic-military dictatorship of 1973–1985, in Chile during the dictatorship of Augusto Pinochet (1973–1990), in Argentina during the so-called National Reorganization Process (1976–1983). The report of CONADEP in Argentina detailed the use of a torture method known as "the recto-scope" which consisted of inserting living rats into a victim's rectum or vagina through a tube. Amnesty International documented the case of a woman tortured by the Chilean CNI (National Information Center, successor to the DINA) in 1981, who described being kept in a room full of live rats during interrogation.

Serial killer Richard Kuklinski alleged in a series of interviews that one of his preferred methods of murder was to tie up a victim and leave them in a cave overnight so they could be eaten alive by rats. He would also leave a Super 8 camera in the cave to film the events. Like many of Kuklinski's other claims, this has been disputed due to insufficient evidence.

On October 16, 2010, in Lakewood, New Jersey, David Wax and Judy Wax kidnapped Yisrael Bryskman and was threatened with rat torture unless he agreed to give his wife a get (Jewish divorce document). David Wax was sentenced to seven years imprisonment for conspiracy to commit kidnapping and Judy Wax was charged with misprision of a felony and was sentenced to two years of probation.

== In fiction ==
Rats are featured in the Edgar Allan Poe story The Pit and the Pendulum. The narrator lies on the rack and can only watch as a scythe swings back and forth, approaching closer each time, as rats swarm over his body. The narrator later manages to make the rats eat through the straps.

An account similar to the Sonoy torture appears in the 1899 Octave Mirbeau novel The Torture Garden, and psychologist Leonard Shengold has identified this as the possible source of the story that the Rat Man told Freud. Part of the book, an imaginary dialog between a torturer and a beautiful woman who is sexually excited by the accounts, is set in China.

The threat of rat torture occurs in Nineteen Eighty-Four. The central character, Winston Smith, is arrested by the Ministry of Love, and undergoes a process of mental reprogramming. The ministry imprisons him in Room 101 to finalize the reprogramming. Here, Winston must face his greatest fear: rats. A cage filled with hungry rats is placed over his head, their only source of food or escape being by eating their way through Winston's face. At this point, Winston breaks and begs for the method to be used on his lover Julia, a sign that he has finally broken.

In Bret Easton Ellis's novel American Psycho, Patrick Bateman inserts a starving rat into a kidnapped woman's vagina through a pipe.

In the 2003 film 2 Fast 2 Furious, a sequel to The Fast and The Furious, the main antagonist Carter Verone (Cole Hauser) uses rat torture to force a detective to allow his men to conduct their criminal enterprises unimpeded. He places a rat on the detective's stomach and encapsulates it inside a metal bucket. He then begins to heat the bucket using a blow torch to cause the rat stress, prompting it to try to escape. With no alternative, the rat starts to scratch the detective's stomach as it tries to burrow to escape the increasing heat inside the bucket. Once the detective agrees to Verone's demands, the bucket is removed, revealing an array of deep, bloody scratch marks.

Season 2 of the HBO dark fantasy series Game of Thrones from 2012 also uses rat torture by the Tickler on prisoners of Gregor Clegane in Harrenhal.

In the horror film Sinister 2, a snuff film titled "Sunday Service" depicts a family nailed to the floor of a church as rats are placed upon their bellies. Cups are tied on top to keep the rats in place. Hot coals are placed on the cups, encouraging the rats to burrow through the victims' chests to escape the heat.

In the film The Batman, the Riddler livestreams himself killing crooked Commissioner Pete Savage by strapping a device to Savage's head that forced rats from a maze to burrow their way into his face.

In the 2024 film Terrifier 3, there is a prolonged scene involving rats being forced down Jess's throat to eat her insides.

== See also ==
- List of torture methods and devices
