= Anne-Marie Sandler =

Swiss-born British psychologist (1925–2018)

- Born: December 15, 1925
- Died: July 25, 2018 (aged 92)
- Education: University of Geneva
- Scientific career
- Fields: Psychoanalysis

Anne-Marie Sandler (December 15, 1925 – July 25, 2018) was a Swiss-born British psychologist and psychoanalyst noted for her clinical observation of the relationship dynamic between blind infants and their mothers in a project spearheaded by Anna Freud.

== Early life ==
Anne-Marie Weil was born in a Jewish-German family in Geneva, Switzerland, as the daughter of Hildegard and Otto Weil. Otto was a general manager of the Grand Passage department store. Sandler had a brother, Gérard, and they spent their childhood and adolescent years in their birth town. As she grew up, Sandler joined the undergraduate and postgraduate program in psychology at the University of Geneva, where she was selected by Jean Piaget to become his research assistant in his project with UNESCO in Switzerland, which focused on the development of children’s perception of homeland and foreignness. Not long after the project was completed, Sandler, who was in her 20s, moved to London to start her career as a psychoanalyst. During this same period, Sandler’s brother died in Palestine in 1948.

== Career and impact ==
Sandler started her training at Hampstead Clinic to become a child psychoanalyst and spent her time there from 1950 to 1954. It was during this time that she became part of Anna Freud’s project. Sandler noticed that mothers of blind infants unconsciously treated their children just like sighted children, which stifled the communication between the infant and the mother. Not only that, but the lack of accommodation for the blind children, led to their inadequate education. Sandler attributed the mother’s narcissistIc wounds as the reason why the phenomenon arises in an article she wrote in 1963.

After finishing her training at Hampstead Clinic, Sandler joined the British Psychoanalytical Society (BPS) where she started practicing psychoanalysis for adult clients. Her experience there alongside her involvement in Anna Freud’s project, inspired Sandler to write her seminal work, “Beyond Eight Months Anxiety,” published in 1977, where she reconceptualized the stranger anxiety experienced by infants as a condition that is also present in her adult clients.

As Sandler continued her psychoanalyst practice, she proceeded with writing several works on the field, sometimes, in collaboration with her husband. In 1983, she became the president of the European Psychoanalytical Federation (EPF) and three years after stepping down from the position, she was elected as the president of BPS in 1990.

In 1987 she appeared on the first edition of the celebrated television discussion programme After Dark, alongside among others Clive Ponting, Colin Wallace, T. E. Utley and Peter Hain.

She held prominent positions in the Anna Freud Center, serving as its director in 1993 and later as trustee of the center from 1996 to 2013. She was also active in the International Psychoanalytical Association and was the organization’s vice president from 1993 to 1997.

== Awards and honours ==
In 1998, she was awarded the Mary Sigourney Award for “Outstanding Achievement in Psychoanalysis”. And in 2015, she received the “Distinguished Contributions to Psychoanalysis” award from the European Psychoanalytical Federation.

== Personal life ==
In addition to English, Sandler spoke German and French fluently. In 1957, she married Joseph J. Sandler, a fellow psychoanalyst, who died in 1998. She had three children, including her stepdaughter from Joseph’s previous marriage, Trudy, Catherine, and Paul.

== Representative publications ==
- Sandler, A. M. (1963). Aspects of passivity and ego development in the blind infant. The Psychoanalytic Study of the Child, 18(1), 343-360.
- Sandler, A. M. (1975). Comments on the significance of Piaget's work for psychoanalysis. International Review of Psycho-Analysis, 2, 365-377.
- Sandler, A. M. (1977). Beyond eight-month anxiety. International Journal of Psycho-Analysis, 58, 195-207.
- Sandler, A. M., & Godley, W. (2004). Institutional responses to boundary violations: The case of Masud Khan. International Journal of Psychoanalysis, 85(1), 27-43.
- Sandler, A. M., & Hobson, R. P. (2001). On engaging with people in early childhood: The case of congenital blindness. Clinical Child Psychology and Psychiatry, 6(2), 205-222.
- Sandler, J., & Sandler, A. M. (1978). On the development of object relationships and affects. International Journal of Psycho-Analysis, 59, 285-296.
