= Dominant narrative =

Frequently repeated story in society

Dominant narratives, sometimes called dominant cultural narratives, are frequently-repeated stories that are shared in society through various social and cultural institutions. The term is most frequently used in pedagogy, the study of education. Dominant narratives are often discussed in tandem with counternarratives.

This term has been described as an "invisible hand" that guides reality and perceived reality. Dominant culture is defined as the majority cultural practices of a society.

Dominant narrative is similar in some ways to the ideas of metanarrative or grand narrative.

Sociologist Judith Lorber defines and describes "A-category" members as those that occupy the dominant group in different aspects of life.

Dominant narratives are generally characterized as coming from, or being supported by, privileged or powerful groups. According to political scientist Ronald R. Krebs, dominant narratives are maintained through public support because "even those who disagree with their premises typically abstain from publicly challenging them, for fear of being ignored or castigated." Scholars have used critical discourse analysis to study dominant narratives, with the goal of disrupting the narratives. In K–12 economics education in the United States, neoclassical economics is considered a dominant narrative.

According to psychologist Robyn Fivush, counternarratives "use the dominant narrative as a starting point, agreeing on many of the main facts" while changing the subjective perspective.

== See also ==
- Euthyphro dilemma
- Might makes right
- Role engulfment
- Role suction
