= Parallel process =

Phenomenon noted in clinical supervision of therapy

Parallel process is a phenomenon noted in clinical supervision by therapist and supervisor, whereby the therapist recreates, or parallels, the client's problems by way of relating to the supervisor. The client's transference and the therapist's countertransference thus re-appear in the mirror of the therapist/supervisor relationship.

== Origins and nature ==
Attention to parallel process first emerged in the nineteen-fifties. The process was termed reflection by Harold Searles in 1955, and two years later T. Hora (1957) first used the actual term parallel process –emphasising that it was rooted in an unconscious identification with the client/patient which could extend to tone of voice and behaviour. The supervisor thus enacts the central problem of the therapy in the supervision, potentially opening up a process of containment and solution, first by the supervisor and then by the therapist.

Alternatively, the supervisor's own countertransference may be activated in the parallel process, to be reflected in turn between supervisor and consultant, or back into the original patient/helper dyad. Even then, however, careful examination of the material may still illuminate the original therapeutic difficulty as reflected in the parallel situation.

== See also ==
- Acting in
- Acting out
- Joseph J. Sandler
