= Projective identification =

Psychological defense mechanism

Projective identification is a term introduced by Melanie Klein and then widely adopted in psychoanalytic psychotherapy. Projective identification may be used as a type of defense, a means of communicating, a primitive form of relationship, or a route to psychological change; used for ridding the self of unwanted parts or for controlling the other's body and mind.

According to the American Psychological Association, the expression can have two meanings:

1. In psychoanalysis, projective identification is a defense mechanism in which the individual projects qualities that are unacceptable to the self onto another person, and that person introjects the projected qualities and believes themself to be characterized by them appropriately and justifiably.
2. In the object relations theory of Melanie Klein, projective identification is a defense mechanism in which a person fantasizes that part of their ego is split off and projected into the object in order to harm or to protect the disavowed part. In a close relationship, as between parent and child, lovers, or therapist and patient, parts of the self may, in unconscious fantasy, be forced into the other person.

While based on Freud's concept of psychological projection, projective identification represents a step beyond. In R.D. Laing's words, "The one person does not use the other merely as a hook to hang projections on. He/she strives to find in the other, or to induce the other to become, the very embodiment of projection". Feelings which cannot be consciously accessed are defensively projected into another person in order to evoke the thoughts or feelings projected.

== Experience ==
Though a difficult concept for the conscious mind to come to terms with, since its primitive nature makes its operation or interpretation seem more like magic or art than science, projective identification is nonetheless a powerful tool of interpersonal communication.

The recipient of the projection may suffer a loss of both identity and insight as they are caught up in and manipulated by the other person's fantasy. One therapist, for example, describes how "I felt the progressive extrusion of his internalized mother into me, not as a theoretical construct but in actual experience. The intonation of my voice altered became higher with the distinctly Ur-mutter quality." However, should one manage to accept and understand the projection, one will obtain much insight into the projector.

Projective identification differs from the simple projection in that projective identification can become a self-fulfilling prophecy, whereby a person, believing something false about another, influences or coerces that other person to carry out that precise projection. In extreme cases, the recipient may lose any sense of their real self and become reduced to the passive carrier of outside projections as if possessed by them. This phenomenon has been noted in gaslighting (see Introjection § Gaslighting).

== Objects projected ==
The objects (feelings, attitudes) extruded in projective identification are of various kinds – both good and bad, ideal and abjected.

Hope may be projected by a client into their therapist, when they can no longer consciously feel it themselves; equally, it may be a fear of (psychic) dying which is projected.

Aggression may be projected, leaving the projector's personality diminished and reduced; alternatively it may be desire, leaving the projector feeling asexual.

The good/ideal parts of the personality may be projected, leading to dependence upon the object of identification; equally it may be jealousy or envy that are projected, perhaps by the therapist into the client.

== Intensity ==
Projective identification may take place with varying degrees of intensity. In less disturbed personalities, projective identification is not only a way of getting rid of feelings but also of getting help with them. In narcissism, extremely powerful projections may take place and obliterate the distinction between self and other.

== Types ==
Various types of projective identification have been distinguished over the years:

- Acquisitive projective identification – where someone takes on the attributes of someone else – versus attributive projective identification, where someone induces someone else to become one's own projection.
- Projective counter-identification – where the therapist unwittingly assumes the feelings and roles projected outward by the patient, to the point where they identify or unwittingly act out this role within the therapeutic setting
- Dual projective identification – a concept introduced by Joan Lachkar. It primarily occurs when both partners in a relationship simultaneously project onto one another. Both deny the projections, both identify with those projections.

A division has also been made between normal projective identification and pathological projective identification, where what is projected is splintered into minute pieces before the projection takes place.

== In psychotherapy ==
As with transference and countertransference, projective identification can be a potential key to therapeutic understanding, especially where the therapist is able to tolerate and contain the unwanted, negative aspects of the patient's self over time.

Transactional analysis emphasizes the need for the therapist's "Adult" (an ego state directed towards an objective appraisal of reality) to remain uncontaminated if the experience of the client's projective identification is to be usefully understood.

A prior study demonstrated how counsellors may identify and clinically use client projective identification. Also, the three connected phenomena of transference, countertransference, and projective identification are addressed as the foundation for the therapist's successful application of the self as a tool in treatment. This is a three-phase therapy procedure that highlights the significance of the timing of treatments. The phases are splitting by the client, the therapist gradually obtaining the thing split, then the therapist identifying with it. Therapists also practice using a three-phase process, by detecting projective identification, demonstrating understanding and professionalism, then intervening based on it.

== Wounded couple ==
Relationship problems have been linked to the way there can be a division of emotional labour in a couple, by way of projective identification, with one partner carrying projected aspects of the other for them. Thus one partner may carry all the aggression or all the competence in the relationship, the other all the vulnerability.

Jungians describe the resultant dynamics as characterising a so-called "wounded couple" – projective identification ensuring that each carries the most ideal or the most primitive parts of their counterpart. The two partners may initially have been singled out for that very readiness to carry parts of each other's self; but the projected inner conflicts/division then come to be replicated in the partnership itself.

== Responses ==
Conscious resistance to such projective identification may produce on the one side guilt for refusing to enact the projection, on the other bitter rage at the thwarting of the projection.

== See also ==
- Bizarre object
- Codependency
- Donald Meltzer
- Emotional contagion
- Gaslighting § Psychoanalytic explanation
- Guilt trip
- Identification (psychology)
- Introjection
- Role suction
- Transference
- Wilfred Bion
