= Acting out =

Performing an action considered bad

In psychology and psychiatry, acting out is the expression of one's emotion by physical movement, especially ones perceived as socially inappropriate or anti-social. It is considered a form of self-control, and, in psychoanalytic theory, a defense mechanism. They indirectly express emotions through behavior rather than words. These actions are often used to cope with uncomfortable emotions or to relieve tension. They may not have conscious awareness of the meaning or cause of these behaviors.

Some of the characteristics of children who act out include disobedience, sulking, irritability, showing off, aggression, screaming, and moodiness.

In general usage, the action performed is destructive to self or to others. The term is used in this way in sexual addiction treatment, psychotherapy, criminology, and parenting. In contrast, the opposite attitude or behavior of bearing and managing the impulse to perform one's impulse is called acting in.

The performed action may follow impulses of an addiction (e.g. drinking, drug taking or shoplifting). It may also be a means designed (often unconsciously or semi-consciously) to garner attention (e.g. throwing a tantrum (ataque) or behaving promiscuously). Acting out may inhibit the development of more constructive responses to the feelings in question.

== Interpretations ==
=== Psychoanalysis ===
According to psychoanalytic theory, people re-enact past emotional events; this is known as repetition compulsion, a form of acting out. Instead of remembering these as past experiences, they act them out in the present. This is done as an expression of unconscious emotional conflicts, feelings, or desires, often sexual or aggressive, with no conscious awareness of the origin or meaning of these behaviors.

According to Freud, the individual does not remember anything that they have forgotten and instead acts out the repressed material/event. They reproduce it not as a memory but as a repetitive action, which they repeat without knowing why they are repeating it. This repetition is a form of transference where the repressed memories, thoughts, and behaviors are projected onto the therapist in psychoanalysis. It is the ego's refusal of conscious recall of the repressed memories that results in such repetitions.

=== Developmental psychology ===
Early caregiver relationships lay the foundation for future behavior, according to the attachment theory. Research shows insecure avoidant attachments in children are associated with later externalizing behavior, including aggression, defiance, and rule breaking. They are likely to suppress their emotions however, unresolved feelings can build up and lead to aggression and externalizing behaviors. This research also demonstrates disorganized attachment to be a significant predictor of these behaviors, as those with it often struggle with emotional and behavioral regulation due to inconsistent caregiving.

A recent 2023 study found that childhood adversity is a risk factor for adolescents acting out behaviors such as self-harm, bingeing, substance abuse and aggressive behavior. Mentalizing difficulties and epistemic vigilance partially explain this relationship.

Mentalizing difficulties refer to the inability for individuals to perceive and understand themselves and others' mental states (e.g., needs, desires, feelings, and beliefs) and it is thought to play a key role in emotional regulation. For example, if a teacher is offering constructive criticism a teenager who has grown up in an abusive environment may view this as malicious and hostile without understanding the teacher's intentions. Epistemic vigilance refers to problems with the ability to trust the authenticity and personal relevance of social and personal information. This can lead to mistrust and impulsive behavior.

=== Biological basis ===
Studies in behavioural neuroscience has found that thinner cortical regions in the prefrontal cortex, specifically of the left insular and right orbitofrontal cortex, is associated with higher externalizing behaviors, including aggression and rule-breaking, the prefrontal cortex being responsible for emotional regulation and impulse control.

=== Social learning theory ===
According to Albert Bandura's social learning theory, children act out as they observe and imitate aggressive behaviors of role models, typically family members such as parents. These aggressive behaviors can be physical or verbal. Due to vicarious reinforcement, if this aggressive behavior is rewarded, it is more likely to be imitated as it is viewed as an effective way to achieve desired outcomes.

Additionally, imitation is more likely to occur if the child associates with the qualities or characteristics of the role model (identification). In his Bobo Doll experiment he found that children were more likely to imitate aggressive behavior if the model was the same sex. For example, if a boy watches his father physically harm his mother, instead of expressing his emotions through words, the boy is more likely to do the same towards his mum or a future partner, without knowing why he is hitting them. His theory identifies four cognitive factors (attention, retention, production, and motivation) that must be present for imitation of behavior (such as acting out) to take place.

=== Coercive family process ===
Expanding on social learning theory, the coercive family process theorizes coercive cycles as interactions between parents and children that escalate in intensity and reinforce negative behavior. The child threatens to attack (whether verbally or physically); if the parent concedes, the child immediately terminates their attack.

Consider: a mother is shouting at her son to clean his room. He resists, shouting and screaming, and due to his behavior the mother complies, cleaning his room for him. The child thus learns that throwing a tantrum will remove the unpleasant consequence of having to clean his room, and conversely the mother learns that giving up will remove the unpleasant consequence of her son's tantrum. Both the mother and son are unintentionally rewarded for their behaviors via negative reinforcement.

== Analysis ==
Freud considered that patients in analysis tended to act out their conflicts in preference to remembering them –repetition compulsion. The analytic task was then to help "the patient who does not remember anything of what he has forgotten and repressed, but acts it out," in other words to replace the present activity with the past memory.

Otto Fenichel added that acting out in an analytic setting potentially offered valuable insights to the therapist; but was nonetheless a psychological resistance inasmuch as it deals only with the present at the expense of concealing the underlying influence of the past. Lacan also spoke of "the corrective value of acting out", though others qualified this with the proviso that such acting out must be limited in the extent of its destructive/self-destructiveness.

Annie Reich pointed out that the analyst may use the patient by acting out in an indirect countertransference, for example to win the approval of a supervisor.

== Interpretations ==
The interpretation of a person's acting out and an observer's response varies considerably, with context and subject usually setting audience expectations.

=== Parenting ===
Early years, temper tantrums can be understood as episodes of acting out. As young children will not have developed the means to communicate their feelings of distress, tantrums prove an effective and achievable method of alerting parents to their needs and requesting attention.

As children develop they often learn to replace these attention-gathering strategies with more socially acceptable and constructive communications. In adolescent years, acting out in the form of rebellious behaviors such as smoking, shoplifting and drug use can be understood as "a cry for help." Such pre-delinquent behavior may be a search for containment from parents or other parental figures. The young person may seem to be disruptive—and may well be disruptive—but such behavior is often underpinned by an inability to regulate emotions in some other manner.

=== Addiction ===
In behavioral or substance addiction, acting out can give the addict the illusion of being in control. Many people with addiction, either refuse to admit they struggle with it, or some don't even realize they have an addiction. For most people, when their addiction is addressed, they become defensive and act out. This can be a result of multiple emotions including shame, fear of judgment, or anger. It's important to be patient and understanding towards those with addiction, and to realize that most people want to break free from the symptoms and baggage that come with addiction, but don't know how or where to start. There are many preventative measures and programs than can help those who personally struggle with addiction, or for those who have a friend or family member who has an addiction.

=== Criminology ===
Criminologists debate whether juvenile delinquency is a form of acting out, or rather reflects wider conflicts involved in the process of socialization.

== Alternatives ==
Acting out painful feelings may be contrasted with expressing them in ways more helpful to the patient, e.g. by talking out, expressive therapy, psychodrama or mindful awareness of the feelings. Developing the ability to express one's conflicts safely and constructively is an important part of impulse control, personal development and self-care.

=== Parent training programs ===
Parent training programs are used to assist parents in dealing with acting-out behavior. It aims to instil good parenting skills, positive reinforcement, consistent but non-harsh discipline, and monitoring the child's whereabouts and behavior. Before treatment begins, parents are interviewed, and the child undergoes an observation assessment by an independent therapist.

After these assessments, the treatment program begins, carried out with families in a clinic playroom, twice a week. It consists of two phases. In the first phase, the parent is taught to be a more effective reinforcing agent. For example, they are taught to use praise statements when the child produces desirable behaviors (a matter of positive reinforcement. The second phase of the treatment program comprising training the parent in the use of use appropriate commands and time-outs to decrease noncompliant behavior.

== See also ==
- Abstinence (psychoanalysis)
- Alcohol abuse
- Alloplastic adaptation
- Countercontrol
- Counterphobic attitude
- Displaced aggression
- Emotional dysregulation
- Externalizing disorder
- Parallel process
- Psychological stress
- Poète maudit
- Risky sexual behavior
- Stress (biology)
- Substance abuse
