= Friendship and Fratricide =

1967 book by Meyer A. Zeligs

Friendship and Fratricide, an Analysis of Whittaker Chambers and Alger Hiss
- Title page for Friendship and Fratricide, an Analysis of Whittaker Chambers and Alger Hiss (1967)
- Author: Meyer A. Zeligs
- Language: English
- Publisher: Viking
- Publication date: 1967
- Pages: 476

Friendship and Fratricide, an Analysis of Whittaker Chambers and Alger Hiss is a 1967 book by psychoanalyst Meyer A. Zeligs. In his work, Zeligs argued that Whittaker Chambers was a psychopathic personality who had framed Alger Hiss.

== Background ==
Zeligs was a 1928 graduate of the University of Cincinnati and a 1932 graduate of its Medical School, before serving as medical officer in the US Navy during World War II.

On August 3, 1948, Whittaker Chambers, a former U.S. Communist Party member, testified under subpoena before the House Un-American Activities Committee that Alger Hiss, an American government official, had secretly been a Communist while in federal service.

Although Chambers refused to see Zeligs, the author did correspond with Hiss.

== Reaction ==
Friendship and Fratricide was widely panned. In 1978, The New York Times reflected that the work "stirred controversy when it was published in 1967 with the conclusion that Whittaker Chambers was a psychopathic personality".

Writing in the Archive of General Psychiatry, one contemporary reviewer described the book as "almost impossible to put down". Another reviewer characterized the work as a novel genre in an article entitled "The Potential of Psychoanalytic Biography". The Harvard Crimson opined that work "only further complicates the already hopelessly complicated questions surrounding Alger Hiss's alleged crime" Time reviewed the book under the title "Slander of a Dead Man" In the 1999 work "The Strange Case of Alger Hiss and Whittaker Chambers", the author argues that "Zeligs was addressing himself to a genuine psychological riddle in writing Friendship and Fratricide."
