= Sendler =

Sendler is a German surname. It is derived from the Middle High German word sendelære, which refers to a person who makes or deals in silk or other fine fabrics, indicating an occupational origin. Notable people with the surname include:

- Irena Sendler (1910–2008), Polish social worker and humanitarian
- Egon Sendler (1923–2014), German-French Jesuit priest and art historian
