= Internalizing disorder =

Type of emotional and behavioral disorder

An internalizing disorder (or internalising disorder) is one type of emotional and behavioral disorder, along with externalizing disorders, and lower incidence disorders. People who have an internalizing disorder will keep their problems to themselves, or internalize the problems.

== Signs and symptoms ==
Behaviors that are apparent in those with internalizing disorders include depression, withdrawal, anxiety, and loneliness. There are also behavioral characteristics involved with internalizing disorders. Some behavioral abnormalities include poor self-esteem, suicidal behaviors, decreased academic progress, and social withdrawal. Internalizing one's problems, like sadness, can cause the problems to grow into larger burdens such as social withdrawal, suicidal behaviors or thoughts, and other unexplained physical symptoms.

== DSM-5 ==
The internalizing disorders, with high levels of negative affectivity, include depressive disorders, anxiety disorders, obsessive-compulsive and related disorders, trauma and stressor-related disorders, and dissociative disorders, bulimia, and anorexia come under this category, as do dysthymia, and somatic disorders (in Huberty 2017) and posttraumatic stress disorder (in Huberty 2004).

== Treatment ==
Some treatments for internalizing disorders include antidepressants, electroconvulsive therapy, and psychotherapy.

== See also ==
- Deceit
- Eating Disorders
- Illegal drug abuse
- Inner critic
- Internalized oppression
- Obsessive-compulsive disorders
- Scrupulosity
- Somatization

== Source ==
- Huberty, Thomas J. (2017). "Students with Emotional and Behavioral Problems". Reference Module in Neuroscience and Biobehavioral Psychology. doi:10.1016/B978-0-12-809324-5.05547-4. ISBN 978-0-12-809324-5.
