= Negative transference =

Concept in psychoanalysis

Negative transference is the psychoanalytic term for the transference of negative and hostile feelings, rather than positive ones, onto a therapist (or other emotional object).

== Freud's preference ==
In his pioneering studies of transference phenomena, Freud noted the existence of both positive and negative transferences, while expressing a preference for the former, which he initially saw as a prerequisite for analytic work. Freud considered that "The hostile feelings make their appearance as a rule later than the affectionate ones and behind them"; and more frequently in same-sex than in mixed-sex analytic pairings.

Otto Fenichel pointed out that whereas neurotic aggravations can follow the emergence of a negative transference, so too (paradoxically) can improvements: the patient gets better to spite the therapist for emphasising the patient's problems.

== Later formulations ==
Melanie Klein, in her disputes with Anna Freud, laid much greater emphasis on the constructive role to be played by interpreting the negative transference. Jacques Lacan followed her theoretical lead in seeing "the projection of what Melanie Klein calls bad internal objects" as key to "the negative transference that is the initial knot of the analytic drama" - though he himself would face criticism for glossing over the negative transference in training analyses, to keep his analysands in dependence.

W. R. D. Fairbairn was also more interested in the negative than the positive transference, which he saw as a key to the repetition and exposure of unconscious attachments to internalised bad objects. In his wake, object relations theorists have tended to stress the positive results that can emerge from working with the negative transference.

== Technical blocks ==
- Fritz Wittels considered the brevity of Wilhelm Stekel's analyses to be due to his narcissism being unable to endure the emergence of the negative transference.
- Rollo May saw the flaw in person-centered therapy as a pervasive reluctance to deal with the negative transference.

== Literary analogues ==
Describing the process of becoming the focus of a paranoid's hostility, C. P. Snow wrote:

"No one likes being hated: most of us are afraid of it: it jars to the bone when we meet hatred face to face."

== See also ==
- Ambivalence
- Body-centred countertransference
- Dora
- Negative therapeutic reaction
- Paula Heimann
- Scapegoating
