= The Ego and the Id =

Book by Sigmund Freud

- Author: Sigmund Freud
- Original title: Das Ich und das Es
- Publisher: Internationaler Psycho- analytischer Verlag (Vienna), W. W. Norton & Company
- Publication date: April 1923

The Ego and the Id (German: Das Ich und das Es) is a prominent paper by Sigmund Freud, the founder of psychoanalysis. It is an analytical study of the human psyche outlining his theories of the psychodynamics of the id, ego and super-ego, which is of fundamental importance in the development of psychoanalysis. The study was conducted over years of research and was first published in the third week of April 1923.

== Overview ==
The Ego and the Id develops a line of reasoning as a groundwork for explaining various (or perhaps all) psychological conditions, pathological and non-pathological alike. These conditions result from powerful internal tensions—for example: 1) between the ego and the id, 2) between the ego and the super ego, and 3) between the love-instinct and the death-instinct. The book deals primarily with the ego and the effects these tensions have on it.

The ego—caught between the id and the super-ego—finds itself simultaneously engaged in conflict by repressed thoughts in the id and relegated to an inferior position by the super-ego. And at the same time, the interplay between the love instinct and the death instinct can manifest itself at any level of the psyche. The outline below is an exegesis of Freud's arguments, explaining the formation of the aforementioned tensions and their effects.

== Exegesis by chapter ==
=== Presuppositions: "Consciousness and the Unconscious" ===
All concepts in The Ego and the Id are built upon the presupposed existence of conscious and unconscious thoughts. On the first line, Freud states, "[About consciousness and the unconscious] there is nothing new to be said... the division of mental life into what is conscious and what is unconscious is the fundamental premise on which psycho-analysis is based" (9). He further distinguishes between two types of unconscious thoughts: "preconscious" ideas, which are latent yet fully capable of becoming conscious; and "unconscious" ideas, which are repressed and cannot become conscious without the help of psychoanalysis.

It would be overly simple to assume that the unconscious and the conscious map directly onto the id and the ego, respectively. Freud argues that (according to his work with psychoanalysis) the supposedly conscious ego can be shown to possess unconscious thoughts (16) when it unknowingly resists parts of itself. Thus, a third kind of unconscious thought seems to be necessary, a process that is neither repressed nor latent (18), but which is nonetheless an integral part of the ego: the act of repression.

If this is true, Freud argues that the idea of "unconsciousness" must be reevaluated: contrary to prior belief, human psychodynamics cannot be fully explained by a tension between unconscious and conscious thoughts. A new framework is required, one that further examines the status of the ego.

=== Mapping the new framework: "The Ego and the Id" ===
Before defining the ego explicitly, Freud argues for a manner in which unconscious thoughts can be made conscious. He believes the answer lies in the difference between unconscious thoughts and preconscious thoughts: The unconscious are "worked out upon some sort of material that remains unrecognized" (21), while the preconscious are connected to perceptions, especially "verbal images". The difference, then, is a connection to words (more specifically, to the "memory residue" of words.) The goal of psychoanalysis, then, is to connect the freely floating unconscious material to words via psychoanalytic dialogue.

He goes on to note that the ego is essentially a system of perception, so it must be closely related to the preconscious (27). Thus, two primary components of ego are a system of perception and a set of unconscious (specifically, preconscious) ideas. Its relationship to the unconscious id (German: Es), therefore, is a close one. The ego merges into the id (28). He compares the dynamic to that of a rider and a horse. The ego must control the id, like the rider, but at times, the rider is obliged to guide the horse where it wants to go. Likewise, the ego must, at times, conform to the desires of the id. Finally, the ego is a "modified portion" of the id that can perceive the empirical world (29). It is this idea of perception that leads Freud to call the ego a "body-ego" (31)—a mental projection of the surface of one's physical body.

=== Further complication: "The Ego and the Super-Ego (Ego-Ideal)" ===
The ego is divided into two parts: the ego itself and the super-ego (German: Über-Ich), or the ego-ideal (German: Ideal-Ich) (34). Although Freud seems never to argue for the existence of a super-ego in The Ego and the Id (save to reference one of his earlier works in a footnote), we may consider a need for the super-ego implicit in Freud's previous arguments. Indeed, the super-ego is the solution to the mystery raised in the first chapter—the unconscious part of the ego, the part that acts in a repressive capacity.

His argument for the formation of the super-ego hinges on the idea of internalization—a processes in which (after a formerly present object becomes absent) the mind creates an internal version of the same object. He gives the example of melancholia resulting from the loss of a sexual object (35). In cases such as these, the melancholic subject constructs a new object within the ego—to mitigate the pain of loss. The ego, in some sense, becomes the object (at least as far as the id's libido is concerned.) The love of the id is redirected—away from the external world—and turned inward.

Freud arrives at his conclusions about the super-ego by combining the idea of internalization with the idea of the Oedipus complex. In early childhood, prior to the Oedipus complex, an individual forms an important identification with the father. This identification is later complicated by the object-cathexis that forms as a result of the mother's breast. The attitude toward the father then becomes ambivalent, for the paternal figure is simultaneously identified with yet perceived as an obstacle. Later, the entire dual-natured complex is taken internally, forming a new part of his ego which has the same moral authority that a parent might have. This seems simple enough, but if the super-ego manifests itself as a father figure, then we cannot ignore the dual nature of the Oedipal father. The super-ego compels the ego to be like the father (as in the primary identification) and simultaneously places an injunction upon the ego, compelling it not to be like the father (as in the Oedipus complex, where the male child cannot take the father's place.)

Sexual instincts that stem from the id and bring about the Oedipus complex, are what dictate the shape and structure of the super-ego. If this is true, many of our “higher” moral quandaries may actually be sexual in origin (53). Freud returns to this later, in the final chapter.

=== Forces within the framework: "Two Classes of Instincts" ===
Having laid out the general shape and conduits of the mind, Freud goes on to elucidate the forces that act within that structure—namely, the love instinct and the death instinct. The former is the tendency to create; the latter, the tendency to destroy. He props up his argument for these forces by appealing to cosmology and by implicitly invoking ideas of entropy and Newton's third law of motion (that of equal and opposite forces): “the task of [the death instinct] is to lead organic matter back to the inorganic state; on the other hand... Eros aims at more far-reaching coalescence of the particles into which living matter has been dispersed” (56). Besides this purely aesthetic reasoning, Freud gives no further argument for the existence of these two opposing instincts—save to (parenthetically) mention "anabolism and katabolism" (56), the cellular processes of building up and breaking down molecules.

Using these opposing instincts as the basis for further inquiry, Freud notes that there are cases where love seems to transform into hate and where hate transforms into love (59). This would seem to indicate that there are not, in fact, two opposing instincts. However, Freud resolves the matter by asserting the presence of a neutral energy, which can be applied to furthering either instinct. And as the energy flow shifts, it can create what appears to be the transformation of one instinct into its opposite (61–62).

Where does this neutral energy come from? The answer may lie in sexuality—in a “narcissistic reservoir of libido... [that is] desexualized Eros.” This process of desexualization occurs, according to Freud, when libidinal energy passes from the id (its origin) into the ego—which (through a process called “sublimation”) abandons the original sexual aims and utilizes the energy to fuel thought and self-interested motility (62). The libido is, therefore, transformed into energy that can be applied toward creative or destructive aims.

This would seem to indicate that Eros—the love-instinct—is the primary motivation of the id. But Freud notes that, in actuality, the id's compulsion to comply with the love-instinct is actually a manifestation of the pleasure principle, or the tendency to avoid tensions that come with the love-instinct. Complying with the love instinct can sometimes (especially in more primitive animals) give the death-instinct free rein. This concept returns in the following chapter, where Freud suggests that the death-instinct can take up residence in the super-ego.

=== Key conclusions: "The Subordinate Relationships of the Ego" ===
In this final chapter, Freud calls the ego "the innocent ego." If the ideas he posits here are accurate, then the ego, indeed, finds itself a victim to the stronger super-ego and id (which tend to work together). “The super-ego is always in close touch with the id and can act as its representative in relation to the ego” (70). Freud cites his experiences in psychoanalysis, in which people exhibit a sense of guilt that makes them resistant to conquering their pathology. His explanation is that the super-ego condemns the ego—"[displaying] particular severity and [raging] against the ego with the utmost cruelty" (73) and giving it a deep-seated, mysterious feeling of guilt.

This is what happens when the death instinct takes hold of the super-ego and turns on the ego (77). During the process of sublimation—the love-instinct and death-instinct (formerly fused) become separated; and the latter ends up in the super-ego causing it to “rage” against the ego. Sometimes the ego's unfortunate position can result in obsessional neuroses, hysteria, and even suicide—depending on the ego's reaction to the super-ego's chastisement. Sometimes (in the case of melancholia) the ego has identified with a forbidden love-object so strongly, that it can't bear the super-ego's criticism and gives up—with suicide. At other times (as in obsessional neuroses) the object is still external to the ego, but its feelings for it are repressed, resulting in acts of external aggression. And finally (in cases of hysteria) both the object, the feelings for it, and resulting guilt (caused by the super-ego's criticism) are repressed—causing hysteric reactions.

On the opposite front, the ego finds itself trying to both appease and mediate the desires of the id. It stands on a middle ground between the id and the outside world, trying to make the id conform to societal rules, while trying to make the world conform to the id's innermost passions. This task falls to the ego because it is the only part of the mind capable of exercising direct control over the actions of the body. The relationship of the ego to the id is, at the same time, a mutually beneficial one and a submissive one: "[The ego] is not only the ally of the id; it is also a submissive slave who courts the love of his master" (83).

Thus the ego finds itself the seat of anxiety, beset by potential dangers from three directions (84)—by the super-ego, the id, and the external world.

== See also ==
- Negative therapeutic reaction

== Works cited ==
- Freud, Sigmund. The Ego and the Id. The Hogarth Press Ltd. London, 1949.
