= Negative therapeutic reaction =

The negative therapeutic reaction in psychoanalysis is the paradoxical phenomenon whereby a plausible interpretation produces, rather than improvement, a worsening of the analysand's condition.

== Freud's formulations ==
Freud first named the negative therapeutic reaction in The Ego and the Id of 1923, seeing its cause, not merely in the analysand's desire to be superior to their analyst, but (more deeply) in an underlying sense of guilt: "the obstacle of an unconscious sense of guilt....they get worse during the treatment instead of getting better". The following year he offered the alternative formulation of a need for punishment instead; but in his thirties summation it was again unconscious guilt to which he attributed "the negative therapeutic reaction which is so disagreeable from the prognostic point of view".

Precursors to the idea can be found in his own article Criminals from a sense of guilt, as well as in Karl Abraham's 1919 article on envy and narcissism as enemies of the analytic work.

== Later developments ==
The negative therapeutic reaction is unusual in psychoanalytic history in never being the subject of major controversy, while still be steadily worked on and reformulated in later analytic phases. These have added additional motivations behind the reaction to that singled out by Freud. Joan Riviere pointed to the neurotic's fear of any change in condition, even from worse to better, while the desire to spite the analyst may also be a motive. Lacan highlighted the role of amour propre in the hatred of being helped by any outside force. Object relations theory has also pointed to the way that underdoing defences means the patient experiencing their underlying conflicts more fully, and reacting negatively to that.

== See also ==
- Acting in
- Acting out
- Death drive
- Melanie Klein
- Negative transference
- Wrecked by success
