= Joseph J. Sandler =

Joseph J. Sandler (10 January 1927, Cape Town – 6 October 1998, London) was a British psychoanalyst within the Anna Freud Grouping – now the Contemporary Freudians – of the British Psychoanalytical Society; and is perhaps best known for what has been called his 'silent revolution' in re-aligning the concepts of the object relations school within the framework of ego psychology.

== Life ==
Born and educated in the Union of South Africa, including a medical degree, Sandler moved to London following fears around his anti-apartheid stance, where he completed his PhD in psychology at University College, London in 1950, before further training in medicine and psychoanalysis. He became a training analyst in 1955.

Sandler was editor of the International Journal of Psycho-Analysis from 1969 to 1978; and was elected President of the International Psychoanalytical Association in 1989.

Sandler was married to fellow psychoanalyst Anne-Marie Sandler and was father to three children.

Sandler was the first Sigmund Freud Professor of Psychoanalysis at the Hebrew University, requested by Anna Freud and funded in large part by American psychoanalysts. He stayed for five years, and also raised research funds for a Center. As an MD and Ph.D., he insisted that the Chair be placed directly reporting to the Dean of Social Sciences, given the long-standing animosity within the Psychology Department (as documented, for instance in Kahnemann's book on his and Twersky's experiences as students there prior to Sandler). After Sandler, the Freud Chair was filled by various prominent visiting Professors, including Al Solnit (Yale Child Study Center), Sid Blatt (Yale Psychology) and Bennet Simon (Harvard). Then, Shmuel Erlich occupied the position for some years. After Erlich, the Chair remained vacant and no search was performed. During Erlich's term, the Psychoanalytic Research Funds were separated from the Chair of Psychoanalysis and no longer produced published research in psychoanalysis. Nathan Szajnberg was invited by the President of the University to fill the position (2007-2010). During Szajnberg's term, he produced three books on development and psychoanalysis ("Lives Across Time" (a 30-year study of infant development with H. Massie); "Reluctant Warriors" (on elite Israeli soldiers) and "Sheba and Solomon's Return" (on Ethiopian children and families in Israel).

The Freud Chair is no longer occupied by a psychoanalyst.

== Theoretical openness ==
Sandler took an open, pragmatic approach to psychoanalytic theorising – something particularly important in the wake of the Controversial discussions which had left a three-way split inside the British Society. He took the view that 'we have a body of ideas, rather than a consistent whole, that constitutes psychoanalytic theory', and called for 'a greater degree of tolerance of concepts... created by people who have a different psychoanalytic background' – something that was of great importance in his rapprochement between Kleinian ideas and ego psychology.

== Safety ==
Sandler emphasised early in his work (1959) the importance of the feeling of safety, which he linked to early experiences of primary narcissism' He noted however that the search for safety could act as a resistance in psychotherapy; but also highlighted the role of a sense of trust in forging the therapeutic alliance.

== Role responsiveness and actualization ==
Sandler introduced the term actualization into psychoanalysis from literary studies, to cover the process whereby past object-relationships are brought to life within the analytic setting. Through what he termed the free-floating (if controlled and moderated) 'role responsiveness' of the therapist, the latter was able to bring into being the unconscious fantasy of the patient and so expose it to light – becoming in the process someone a little different with each patient.

Sandler himself saw the process of actualization as adumbrated in the 7th chapter of Freud's The Interpretation of Dreams; and similar concepts can be found in ego psychology, which speaks of the 'evocation' of a proxy and among post-Jungians with their talk of a 'complementary' countertransference. Sandler's concept also connects with the ideas of acting out and acting in within the analytic session, though Otto Kernberg emphasises specifically how Sandler differentiated actualization from acting out.

Sandler specifies several different types of actualization, including delusive actualization and symbolic actualization.

The concept of role responsiveness has subsequently been taken up more widely in British psychoanalysis, as well as by intersubjective analysts, who see at least one aspect of countertransference as the therapist's reaction to the role the patient wishes to force upon them.

=== Example ===
A clear example of actualization described shortly before Sandler's introduction of the term tells how, in an analytic encounter with a young man, one psychoanalyst – David Cooper – had "felt the progressive extrusion of his internalized mother into me, not as a theoretical construct but in actual experience".

== On psychotherapy ==
Sandler considered that psychotherapy could in homely terms be thought of as a process of 'making friends' with unacceptable parts of oneself. His willingness to look beyond dogmatic theorising and to take on board the normal as well as the abnormal in psychotherapeutic assessment helped facilitate the bridging role he played within the often fragmented world of postmodern psychotherapies.

== See also ==
- Analytic neutrality
