= Externalizing disorder =

Behavioral disorders

Externalizing disorders (or externalising disorders) are mental disorders characterized by externalizing behaviors, maladaptive behaviors directed toward an individual's environment, which cause impairment or interference in life functioning. In contrast to individuals with internalizing disorders who internalize (keep inside) their maladaptive emotions and cognitions, such feelings and thoughts are externalized (manifested outside) in behavior in individuals with externalizing disorders. Externalizing disorders are often specifically referred to as disruptive behavior disorders (attention-deficit/hyperactivity disorder, oppositional defiant disorder, and conduct disorder) or conduct problems which occur in childhood. Externalizing disorders, however, are also manifested in adulthood. For example, alcohol- and substance-related disorders and antisocial personality disorder are adult externalizing disorders. Externalizing psychopathology is associated with antisocial behavior, which is different from and often confused for asociality.

== Signs and symptoms ==
Externalizing disorders often involve emotion dysregulation problems and impulsivity that are manifested as antisocial behavior and aggression in opposition to authority, societal norms, and often violate the rights of others. Some examples of externalizing disorder symptoms include, often losing one's temper, excessive verbal aggression, physical aggression to people and animals, destruction of property, theft, and deliberate fire setting. As with all DSM-5 mental disorders, an individual must have functional impairment in at least one domain (e.g., academic, occupational, social relationships, or family functioning) in order to meet diagnostic criteria for an externalizing disorder. Moreover, an individual's symptoms should be atypical for their cultural and environmental context and physical medical conditions should be ruled out before an externalizing disorder diagnosis is considered. Diagnoses must be made by qualified mental health professionals. DSM-5 classifications of externalizing disorders are listed herein, however, ICD-10 can also be used to classify externalizing disorders. More specific criteria and examples of symptoms for various externalizing disorders can be found in the DSM-5.

=== DSM-5 classification ===
There are no specific criteria for "externalizing behavior" or "externalizing disorders". Thus, there is no clear classification of what constitutes an externalizing disorder in the DSM-5. Attention-deficit/hyperactivity disorder (ADHD), oppositional defiant disorder (ODD), conduct disorder (CD), antisocial personality disorder (ASPD), pyromania, kleptomania, intermittent explosive disorder (IED), and substance-related disorders are frequently referred to as externalizing disorders. Disruptive mood dysregulation disorder has also been posited as an externalizing disorder, but little research has examined and validated it to date given its recent addition to the DSM-5, and thus, it is not included further herein.

==== Attention-deficit/hyperactivity disorder ====
Inattentive ADHD symptoms include: "often fails to give close attention to details or makes careless mistakes in schoolwork, at work, or during other activities," "often has difficulty sustaining attention in tasks or play activities," "often does not seem to listen when spoken to directly," "often does not follow through on instructions and fails to finish schoolwork, chores, or duties in the workplace," "often has difficulty organizing tasks and activities," "often avoids, dislikes, or is reluctant to engage in tasks that require sustained mental effort," "often loses things necessary for tasks or activities," "is often easily distracted by extraneous stimuli (for older adolescents and adults, may include unrelated thoughts)," and "is often forgetful in daily activities."

Hyperactive and impulsive ADHD symptoms include: "often fidgets with or taps hands or feet or squirms in seat," "often leaves seat in situations when remaining seated is expected," "often runs about or climbs in situations where it is inappropriate," "is often unable to play or engage in leisure activities quietly," "is often "on the go," acting as if "driven by a motor," "often talks excessively," "often blurts out an answer before a question has been completed," "often has difficulty waiting his or her turn," and "often interrupts or intrudes on others."

In order to meet criteria for an ADHD diagnosis, an individual must have at least six symptoms of inattention and/or hyperactivity/impulsivity, have an onset of several symptoms prior to age 12 years, have symptoms present in at least two settings, have functional impairment, and have symptoms that are not better explained by another mental disorder.

==== Oppositional defiant disorder ====
ODD symptoms include: "often loses temper," "is often touchy or easily annoyed," "is often angry and resentful," "often argues with authority figures, or for children and adolescents, with adults," "often actively defies or refuses to comply with requests from authority figures or with rules," "often deliberately annoys others," and "often blames others for his or her mistakes or misbehavior." In order to receive an ODD diagnosis, individuals must have at least four symptoms from above for at least six months (most days for youth younger than five years) with at least one individual who is not a sibling, which causes impairment in at least one setting. Rule outs for a diagnosis include symptoms occurring concurrently during an episode of another disorder.

==== Conduct disorder ====
CD symptoms include "often bullies, threatens, or intimidates others," "often initiates physical fights," "has used a weapon that can cause serious physical harm to others," "has been physically cruel to people," "has been physically cruel to animals," "has stolen while confronting a victim," "has forced someone into sexual activity," "has deliberately engaged in fire setting with the intention of causing serious damage," "has deliberately destroyed others' property (other than by fire setting)," "has broken into someone else's house, building, or car," "often lies to obtain goods or favors or to avoid obligations," "has stolen items of nontrivial value without confronting a victim," "often stays out at night despite parental prohibitions, beginning before age 13 years," "has run away from home overnight at least twice while living in the parental or parental surrogate home, or once without returning for a lengthy period," and "is often truant from school, beginning before age 13 years." In order to receive a CD diagnosis, individuals must have three of these symptoms for at least one year, at least two symptoms for at least six months, be impaired in at least one setting, and not have an antisocial personality disorder diagnosis if 18 years or older.

==== Antisocial personality disorder ====
ASPD symptoms include: "failure to conform to social norms with respect to lawful behaviors, as indicated by repeatedly performing acts that are grounds for arrest," "deceitfulness, as indicated by repeated lying, use of aliases, or conning others for personal profit or pleasure," "impulsivity or failure to plan ahead," "irritability and aggressiveness, as indicated by repeated physical fights or assaults," "reckless disregard for safety of self or others," "consistent irresponsibility, as indicated by repeated failure to sustain consistent work behavior or honor financial obligations," and "lack of remorse, as indicated by being indifferent to or rationalizing having hurt, mistreated, or stolen from another." In order to meet diagnostic criteria for ASPD, an individual must have "a pervasive pattern of disregard for and violation of the rights of others, occurring since age 15 years," three or more of the above symptoms, be at least age 18 years, have a conduct disorder onset before age 15 years, and not have antisocial behavior exclusively during schizophrenia or bipolar disorder.

==== Pyromania ====
Pyromania symptoms include: "deliberate and purposeful fire setting on more than one occasion," "tension or affective arousal before the act," "fascination with, interest in, curiosity about, or attraction to fire and its situational contexts," and "pleasure, gratification, or relief when setting fires or when witnessing or participating in their aftermath." In order to receive a pyromania diagnosis, "the fire setting is not done for monetary gain, as an expression of sociopolitical ideology, to conceal criminal activity, to express anger or vengeance, to improve one's living circumstances, in response to a delusion or hallucination, or as a result of impaired judgment." A conduct disorder diagnosis, manic episode, or antisocial personality disorder diagnosis must not better account for the fire setting in order to receive a pyromania diagnosis.

==== Kleptomania ====
Kleptomania symptoms include: "recurrent failure to resist impulses to steal objects that are not needed for personal use or for their monetary value," "increasing sense of tension immediately before committing the theft," and "pleasure, gratification, or relief at the time of committing the theft." In order to receive a kleptomania diagnosis, "the stealing is not committed to express anger or vengeance and is not in response to a delusion or a hallucination." Additionally, in order to receive a diagnosis, "the stealing is not better explained by conduct disorder, a manic episode, or antisocial personality disorder."

==== Intermittent explosive disorder ====
IED symptoms include "recurrent behavioral outbursts representing a failure to control aggressive impulses as manifested by either of the following: 1) Verbal aggression (e.g., temper tantrums, tirades, verbal arguments or fights) or physical aggression toward property, animals, or other individuals, occurring twice weekly, on average, for a period of 3 months. The physical aggression does not result in damage or destruction of property and does not result in physical injury to animals or other individuals. 2) Three behavioral outbursts involving damage or destruction of property and/or physical assault involving physical injury against animals or other individuals occurring within a 12-month period." In order to receive an IED diagnosis, "the magnitude of aggressiveness expressed during the recurrent outbursts is grossly out of proportion to the provocation or to any precipitating psychosocial stressors," "the recurrent aggressive outbursts are not premeditated" and "are not committed to achieve some tangible objective." Additionally, to receive an IED diagnosis, an individual must be six years or older (chronologically or developmentally), have functional impairment, and not have symptoms better explained by another mental disorder, medical condition, or substance.

==== Substance use disorders ====
According to the DSM-5, "the essential feature of a substance use disorder is a cluster of cognitive, behavioral, and physiological symptoms indicating that the individual continues using the substance despite significant substance-related problems." Given that at least 10 separate classes of drugs are covered in the DSM-5 Substance-Related and Addictive Disorders section, it is outside the scope of this article, and referral to the DSM-5 for more information on signs and symptoms is advised.

=== Comorbidity ===
Externalizing disorders are frequently comorbid or co-occurring with other disorders. Individuals who have the co-occurrence of more than one externalizing disorder have homotypic comorbidity, whereas individuals who have co-occurring externalizing and internalizing disorders have heterotypic comorbidity. It is not uncommon for children with early externalizing problems to develop both internalizing and further externalizing problems across the lifespan. Additionally, the complex interplay between externalizing and internalizing symptoms across development could explain the association between these problems and other risk behaviors, that typically initiate in adolescence (such as antisocial behaviors and substance use).

=== Stigma ===
Consistent with many mental disorders, individuals with externalizing disorders are subject to significant implicit and explicit forms of stigma. Because externalizing behaviors are salient and difficult to conceal, individuals with externalizing disorders may be more susceptible to stigmatization relative to individuals with other disorders. Parents of youth with childhood mental disorders, such as ADHD and ODD, are frequently stigmatized when parenting practices are strongly implicated in the etiology or cause of the disorder. Educational and policy-related initiatives have been proposed as potential mechanisms to reduce stigmatization of mental disorders.

== Psychopathic traits ==
Individuals with psychopathic traits, including callous-unemotional (CU) traits, represent a phenomenologically and etiologically distinct group with severe externalizing problems. Psychopathic traits have been measured in children as young as two-years-old, are moderately stable, are heritable, and associated with atypical affective, cognitive, personality, and social characteristics. Individuals with psychopathic traits are at risk for poor response to treatment, however, some data suggest that parent management training interventions for youth with psychopathic traits early in development may have promise.

== Developmental course ==
ADHD often precedes the onset of ODD, and approximately half of children with ADHD, combined type also have ODD. ODD is a risk factor for CD and frequently precedes the onset of CD symptoms. Children with an early onset of CD symptoms, with at least one symptom before age 10 years, are at risk for more severe and persistent antisocial behavior continuing into adulthood. Youth with early-onset conduct problems are particularly at risk for ASPD (note that an onset of CD prior to age 15 is part of the diagnostic criteria for ASPD), whereas CD is typically limited to adolescence when youth's CD symptoms begin during adolescence.

== Treatment ==
Despite recent initiatives to study psychopathology along dimensions of behavior and neurobiological indices, which would help refine a clearer picture of the development and treatment of externalizing disorders, the majority of research has examined specific mental disorders. Thus, best practices for many externalizing disorders are disorder-specific. For example, substance use disorders themselves are very heterogeneous and their best-evidenced treatment typically includes cognitive behavioral therapy, motivational interviewing, and a substance disorder-specific detoxification or psychotropic medication treatment component.

The best-evidenced treatment for childhood conduct and externalizing problems more broadly, including youth with ADHD, ODD, and CD, is parent management training, a form of cognitive behavioral therapy. A 2026 meta-analysis this worked best for younger children. Preschoolers showed larger improvements than elementary school children, with limited evidence for teenagers. Programs involving both parents and children were more effective than parent-only programs. Additionally, individuals with ADHD, both youth and adults, are frequently treated with stimulant medications (or alternative psychotropic medications), especially if psychotherapy alone has not been effective in managing symptoms and impairment. Psychotherapy and medication interventions for individuals with severe, adult forms of antisocial behavior, such as antisocial personality disorder, have been mostly ineffective. An individual's comorbid psychopathology may also influences the course of treatment for an individual.

== History ==
The classification for several externalizing disorders changed from DSM-IV to DSM-5. ADHD, ODD, and CD were previously classified in the Attention-deficit and Disruptive Behavior Disorders section in DSM-IV. Pyromania, kleptomania, and IED were previously classified in the Impulse-Control Disorders Not Otherwise Specified Section of DSM-IV. ADHD is now categorized in the Neurodevelopmental Disorders section in DSM-5. ODD, CD, pyromania, kleptomania, and IED are now categorized in the new Disruptive, Impulse-Control, and Conduct Disorders chapter of DSM-5. Overall, there were many changes made to the DSM from the transition of DSM-IV-TR to DSM-5, which was somewhat controversial.

== See also ==
- Accusation in a mirror
- Displaced aggression
- Displacement (psychology)
- Paranoia
- Self-harm
