= Acting in =

"Acting in" is a psychological term which has been given various meanings over the years, but which is most generally used in opposition to acting out to cover conflicts which are brought to life inside therapy, as opposed to outside.

One commentator, noting the variety of usages, points out that it is often "unclear whether 'in' refers to the internalization into the personality, to the growth in insight, or to the acting within the session".

== Patients ==
With respect to patients, the term 'acting in' has been used to refer to the process of a client/patient bringing an issue from outside the therapy into the analytic situation, and acting upon it there.

The therapist is advised to respond to the issue immediately to prevent further and more disruptive acting in.

Hanna Segal distinguished positive acting in from destructive acting in - both being aimed however at affecting the analyst's state of mind, whether to communicate or to confuse.

=== Posture ===
The term was used in 1957 by Meyer A. Zeligs to refer specifically to the postures taken by analysts in a psychoanalytic session.

== Therapists ==
Psychoanalysis also describes as 'acting in' the process whereby the analyst brings his or her personal countertransference into the analytic situation - as opposed to the converse, the acting out of the patient's transference.

The result is generally agreed to produce a chaotic analytic situation which hampers therapeutic progress.

The term was used rather differently however by Carl Whitaker in the 1960s, so as to refer to the technique whereby therapists increase their involvement in a session in such a way as to ramp up the patient's anxiety for therapeutic ends.

== See also ==
- Abstinence (psychoanalysis)
- Body-centred countertransference
- Countertransference
- Negative therapeutic reaction
- Psychodrama
- Therapeutic relationship
