= Countertransference =

Relational aspect of psychoanalysis

Countertransference is a widely established concept originating in Freudian psychotherapy, in which a therapist's own history and emotions affect how they feel about and treat the patient. It can be a response to transference, in which the patient's history affects how they feel about and react to the therapist.

== Occurrence ==
Countertransference is defined as redirection of a therapist's feelings toward a patient, or more generally, as a therapist's emotional entanglement with a patient. A therapist's attunement to their own countertransference is nearly as critical as understanding the transference. Not only does this help therapists regulate their emotions in the therapeutic relationship, but it also gives therapists valuable insight into what patients are attempting to elicit from them. For example, a therapist who is sexually attracted to a patient must understand the countertransference aspect (if any) of the attraction, and look at how the patient might be eliciting this attraction. Once any countertransference aspect has been identified, the therapist can ask the patient what their feelings are toward the therapist, and can explore how those feelings relate to unconscious motivations, desires, or fears.

Another contrasting perspective on transference and countertransference is offered in classical Adlerian psychotherapy. Rather than using the patient's transference strategically in therapy, the positive or negative transference is diplomatically pointed out and explained as an obstacle to cooperation and improvement. For the therapist, any signs of countertransference would suggest that their own personal training analysis needs to be continued to overcome these tendencies. Andrea Celenza noted in 2010 that "the use of the analyst's countertransference remains a point of controversy".

== Development of theory ==
=== Early formulations ===
The phenomenon of countertransference (German: Gegenübertragung) was first defined publicly by Sigmund Freud in 1910 (The Future Prospects of Psycho-Analytic Therapy) as being "a result of the patient's influence on [the physician's] unconscious feelings"; although Freud had been aware of it privately for some time, writing to Carl Jung for example in 1909 of the need "to dominate 'counter-transference', which is after all a permanent problem for us". Freud stated that since an analyst is a human himself he can easily let his emotions into the client. Because Freud saw the countertransference as a purely personal problem for the analyst, he rarely referred to it publicly, and did so almost invariably in terms of a "warning against any countertransference lying in wait" for the analyst, who "must recognize this countertransference in himself and master it". However, analysis of Freud's letters shows that he was intrigued by countertransference and did not see it as purely a problem.

The potential danger of the analyst's countertransference – "In such cases, the patient represents for the analyst an object of the past on to whom past feelings and wishes are projected" – became widely accepted in psychodynamic circles, both within and without the psychoanalytic mainstream. Thus, for example, Jung warned against "cases of counter-transference when the analyst really cannot let go of the patient...both fall into the same dark hole of unconsciousness". Similarly Eric Berne stressed that "Countertransference means that not only does the analyst play a role in the patient's script, but she plays a part in his...the result is the 'chaotic situation' which analysts speak of". Lacan acknowledged of the analyst's "countertransference...if he is re-animated the game will proceed without anyone knowing who is leading".

In this sense, the term includes unconscious reactions to a patient that are determined by the psychoanalyst's own life history and unconscious content; it was later expanded to include unconscious hostile and/or erotic feelings toward a patient that interfere with objectivity and limit the therapist's effectiveness. For example, a therapist might have a strong desire for a client to get good grades in university because the client reminds her of her children at that stage in life, and the anxieties that the therapist experienced during that time. Even in its most benign form, such an attitude could lead at best to "a 'countertransference cure'...achieved through compliance and a "false self" suppression of the patient's more difficult feelings".

Another example would be a therapist who did not receive enough attention from her father perceiving her client as being too distant and resenting him for it. In essence, this describes the transference of the treater to the patient, which is referred to as the "narrow perspective".

=== Middle years ===
As the 20th century progressed, however, other, more positive views of countertransference began to emerge, approaching a definition of countertransference as the entire body of feelings that the therapist has toward the patient. Jung explored the importance of the therapist's reaction to the patient through the image of the wounded physician: "it is his own hurt that gives the measure of his power to heal". Heinrich Racker emphasised the threat that "the repression of countertransference...is prolonged in the mythology of the analytic situation". Paula Heimann highlighted how the "analyst's countertransference is not only part and parcel of the analytic relationship, but it is the patient's creation, it is part of the patient's personality". As a result, "counter-transference was thus reversed from being an interference to becoming a potential source of vital confirmation". The change of fortune "was highly controversial. Melanie Klein disapproved on the grounds that poorly analyzed psycho-analysts could excuse their own emotional difficulties" thereby; but among her younger followers "the trend within the Kleinian group was to take seriously the new view of counter-transference" – Hanna Segal warning in typically pragmatic fashion however that "Countertransference can be the best of servants but is the most awful of masters".

=== Late twentieth century paradigm ===
By the last third of the century, a growing consensus appeared on the importance of "a distinction between 'personal countertransference' (which has to do with the therapist) and 'diagnostic response' – that indicates something about the patient...diagnostic countertransference". A new belief had come into being that "countertransference can be of such enormous clinical usefulness....You have to distinguish between what your reactions to the patient are telling you about his psychology and what they are merely expressing about your own". A distinction between "neurotic countertransference" (or "illusory countertransference") and "countertransference proper" had come (despite a wide range of terminological variation) to transcend individual schools. The main exception is that for "most psychoanalysts who follow Lacan's teaching...counter-transference is not simply one form of resistance, it is the ultimate resistance of the analyst".

The contemporary understanding of countertransference is thus generally to regard countertransference as a "jointly created" phenomenon between the treater and the patient. The patient pressures the treater through transference into playing a role congruent with the patient's internal world. However, the specific dimensions of that role are colored by treater's own personality. Countertransference can be a therapeutic tool when examined by the treater to sort out who is doing what, and the meaning behind those interpersonal roles (The differentiation of the object's interpersonal world between self and other). Nothing in the new understanding alters of course the need for continuing awareness of the dangers in the narrow perspective – of "serious risks of unresolved countertransference difficulties being acted out within what is meant to be a therapeutic relationship"; but "from that point on, transference and counter-transference were looked upon as an inseparable couple...'total situation'".

=== Twenty-first century developments ===
Further developments in the current century might be said to be the increased recognition that "Most countertransference reactions are a blend of the two aspects", personal and diagnostic, which require careful disentanglement in their interaction; and the possibility that nowadays psychodynamic counsellors use countertransference much more than transference – "another interesting shift in perspective over the years". One explanation of the latter point might be that because "in object relations therapy...the relationship is so central, 'countertransference' reactions are considered key in helping the therapist to understand the transference", something appearing in "the post-Kleinian perspective...[as] Indivisible transferencecountertransference".

== Body-centred countertransference ==
Psychologists at NUI Galway and University College Dublin have measured body-centred countertransference in female trauma therapists using the "Egan and Carr Body Centred Countertransference Scale", a sixteen symptom measure. High levels of body-centred countertransference have since been found in both Irish female trauma therapists and clinical psychologists. This phenomenon is also known as "somatic countertransference" or "embodied countertransference" and links to mirror neurons, and automatic somatic empathy for others due to the actions of these neurons have been hypothesised.

== See also ==
- Abstinence (psychoanalysis)
- Acting in
- Body-centred countertransference
- Joseph J. Sandler
- Neutrality
- Parallel process
- Projective identification
- Psychoanalysis
- Psychodynamic psychotherapy
- Psychotherapy
- Role suction
- Therapeutic relationship

== Bibliography ==
- D. W. Winnicott : 'Hate in the countertransference' in Collected Papers: through Paediatrics to Psychoanalysis (London 1958)
- Alberto Stefana: History of Countertransference. From Freud to the British Object Relations School, Publisher: Routledge, 2017, ISBN 978-1138214613
- Margaret Little: Transference Neurosis and Transference Psychosis, Publisher: Jason Aronson; 1993, ISBN 1-56821-074-4
- Harold Searles: Countertransference and related subjects; selected papers., Publisher New York, International Universities Press, 1979, ISBN 0-8236-1085-3
- K. Maroda: The Power of Countertransference: Innovation in Analytic Technique (Chichester 1991)
- D. Sedgwick, The Wounded Healer: Countertransference from a Jungian Perspective (London 1994)
- Groves, James. (Date). 'Taking care of the hateful patient'. New England Journal of Medicine, Vol. 298 No. 16
- Joseph J. Sandler, 'Countertransference and role-responsiveness', International Review of Psycho-Analysis (1976) 3: 43-7
