= Transference =

Phenomenon within psychotherapy

Transference (German: Übertragung) is a phenomenon within psychotherapy in which repetitions of old feelings, attitudes, desires, or fantasies that someone displaces are subconsciously projected onto a here-and-now person. Traditionally, it had solely concerned feelings from a primary relationship during childhood.

== History ==
Transference was first described by Sigmund Freud, the founder of psychoanalysis, who considered it an important part of psychoanalytic treatment. Transference of this kind can be considered inappropriate without proper clinical supervision.

== Occurrence ==
It is common for people to transfer feelings about their parents to their partners or children (that is, cross-generational entanglements). Other examples of transference would be a person mistrusting somebody who resembles an ex-spouse in manners, voice, or external appearance, or being overly compliant to someone who resembles a childhood friend.

In The Psychology of the Transference, Carl Jung states that within the transference dyad, both participants typically experience a variety of opposites, that in love and in psychological growth, the key to success is the ability to endure the tension of the opposites without abandoning the process, and that this tension allows one to grow and to transform.

Only in a personally or socially harmful context can transference be described as a pathological issue. A modern, social-cognitive perspective on transference explains how it can occur in everyday life. When people meet a new person who reminds them of someone else, they unconsciously infer that the new person has traits similar to the person previously known. This perspective has generated a wealth of research that illuminated how people tend to repeat relationship patterns from the past in the present.

== Transference and counter-transference during psychotherapy ==
In a therapy context, transference refers to redirection of a patient's feelings for a significant person to the therapist. Transference is often manifested as an erotic attraction towards a therapist, but can be seen in many other forms such as rage, hatred, mistrust, parentification, extreme dependence, or even placing the therapist in a god-like or guru status. When Freud initially encountered transference in his therapy with patients, he thought he was encountering patient resistance, as he recognized the phenomenon when a patient refused to participate in a session of free association. But what he learned was that the analysis of the transference was actually the work that needed to be done: "the transference, which, whether affectionate or hostile, seemed in every case to constitute the greatest threat to the treatment, becomes its best tool". The focus in psychodynamic psychotherapy is, in large part, the therapist and patient recognizing the transference relationship and exploring the relationship's meaning. Since the transference between patient and therapist happens on an unconscious level, psychodynamic therapists who are largely concerned with a patient's unconscious material use the transference to reveal unresolved conflicts patients have with childhood figures.

In the Lacanian account transference will appear in the full speech that occurs during free association, revealing the inverse of the subject's past, within the here and now, and the analyst will hear which of the four discourses the subject's desire has been metonymically shifted to, beyond the ego, leading to a dystonic form of resistance.

Countertransference is defined as redirection of a therapist's feelings toward a patient, or more generally, as a therapist's emotional entanglement with a patient. A therapist's attunement to their own countertransference is nearly as critical as understanding the transference. Not only does this help therapists regulate their emotions in the therapeutic relationship, but it also gives therapists valuable insight into what patients are attempting to elicit from them. For example, a therapist who is sexually attracted to a patient must understand the countertransference aspect (if any) of the attraction, and look at how the patient might be eliciting this attraction. Once any countertransference aspect has been identified, the therapist can ask the patient what his or her feelings are toward the therapist, and can explore how those feelings relate to unconscious motivations, desires, or fears.

Another contrasting perspective on transference and countertransference is offered in classical Adlerian psychotherapy. Rather than using the patient's transference strategically in therapy, the positive or negative transference is diplomatically pointed out and explained as an obstacle to cooperation and improvement. For the therapist, any signs of countertransference would suggest that his or her own personal training analysis needs to be continued to overcome these tendencies. Andrea Celenza noted in 2010 that "the use of the analyst's countertransference remains a point of controversy".

== See also ==
- Acting in
- Body-centred countertransference
- Demand (psychoanalysis)
- Displacement (psychology)
- Infatuation § Transference
- Parallel process
- Parataxic distortion
- Projective identification
- Psychological projection
- Repetition compulsion
- Transference neurosis
- Working through
