= Psychoanalytic theory =

Theory of personality organization developed by Sigmund Freud

Psychoanalytic theory is the theory of the innate structure of the human soul and the dynamics of personality development relating to the practice of psychoanalysis, a method of research and for treating of mental disorders (psychopathology). Laid out by Sigmund Freud in the late 19th century (s. The Interpretation of Dreams), he developed the theory and practice of psychoanalysis until his death in 1939. Since then, it has been further refined, also divided into various sub-areas, but independent of this, Freud's structural distinction of the soul into three functionally interlocking instances has been largely retained.

Psychoanalysis with its theoretical core came to full prominence in the last third of the twentieth century, as part of the flow of critical discourse regarding psychological treatments in the 1970s. Freud himself had ceased his physiological research of the neural brain organization in 1906 (see Psychoanalysis#History). shifting his focus to psychology and the treatment of mental health issues by using free associations and the phenomenon of transference. Psychoanalysis is based on the distinction between unconscious and conscious processes, and emphasized the recognition of childhood events that influence the mental functioning of adults. Freud's consideration of human evolutionary history (genetics) and then the aspect of individual psychological development in cultural contexts gave the psychoanalytic theory its characteristics.

== Definition ==
Psychoanalytic and psychoanalytical are used in English. The latter is the older term, and at first, simply meant 'relating to the analysis of the human psyche.' But with the emergence of psychoanalysis as a distinct clinical practice, both terms came to describe that. Although both are still used, today, the normal adjective is psychoanalytic.

Psychoanalysis is defined in the Oxford English Dictionary as

A therapeutic method, originated by Sigmund Freud, for treating mental disorders by investigating the interaction of conscious and unconscious elements in the patient's mind and bringing repressed fears and conflicts into the conscious mind, using techniques such as dream interpretation and free association. Also: a system of psychological theory is associated with this method.

== The beginnings ==
Freud began his studies on psychoanalysis in collaboration with Dr. Josef Breuer, most notably in relation to the case study of Anna O. Anna O. was subject to a number of psychosomatic disturbances, such as not being able to drink out of fear. Breuer and Freud found that hypnosis was a great help in discovering more about Anna O. and her treatment. Freud frequently referred to the study on Anna O. in his lectures on the origin and development of psychoanalysis.

Observations in the Anna O. case led Freud to theorize that the problems faced by hysterical patients could be associated with painful childhood experiences that could not be recalled. The influence of these lost memories shaped the feelings, thoughts, and behaviors of patients. These studies contributed to the development of the psychoanalytic theory.

== Freudian theory ==
=== The unconscious mind ===
In psychoanalytic theory, the unconscious mind consists of ideas and drives that have been subject to the mechanism of repression: anxiety-producing impulses in childhood are barred from consciousness, but do not cease to exist, and exert a constant pressure in the direction of consciousness. However, the content of the unconscious is only knowable to consciousness through its representation in a disguised or distorted form, by way of dreams and neurotic symptoms, as well as in slips of the tongue and jokes. The psychoanalyst seeks to interpret these conscious manifestations in order to understand the nature of the repressed.

In psychoanalytic terms, the unconscious does not include all that is not conscious, but rather that which is actively repressed from conscious thought. Freud viewed the unconscious as a repository for socially unacceptable ideas, anxiety-producing wishes or desires, traumatic memories, and painful emotions put out of consciousness by the mechanism of repression. Such unconscious mental processes can only be recognized through analysis of their effects in consciousness. Unconscious thoughts are not directly accessible to ordinary introspection, but they are capable of partially evading the censorship mechanism of repression in a disguised form, manifesting, for example, as dream elements or neurotic symptoms. Dreams and symptoms are supposed to be capable of being "interpreted" during psychoanalysis, with the help of methods such as free association, dream analysis, and analysis of verbal slips.

=== Psychosexual development ===
Freud's take on the development of the personality (psyche) is a stage theory that believes progress occurs through stages as the libido is directed to different body parts. The different stages, listed in order of progression, are Oral, Anal, Phallic (Oedipus complex), Latency, and Genital. The Genital stage is achieved if people meet all their needs throughout the other stages with enough available sexual energy. Individuals who do not meet their needs in a given stage become fixated or "stuck" in that stage.

=== Personality structure ===
In Freud's model the psyche consists of three different elements, the id, ego, and the superego. The id is the aspect of personality that is driven by internal and basic drives and needs, such as hunger, thirst, and the drive for sex, or libido. The id acts in accordance with the pleasure principle. Due to the instinctual quality of the id, it is impulsive and unaware of the implications of actions. The superego is driven by the morality principle. It enforces the morality of social thought and action on an intrapsychic level. It employs morality, judging wrong and right and using guilt to discourage socially unacceptable behavior. The ego is driven by the reality principle. The ego seeks to balance the conflicting aims of the id and superego, by trying to satisfy the id's drives in ways that are compatible with reality. The Ego is how we view ourselves: it is what we refer to as 'I' (Freud's word is the German ich, which simply means 'I').

=== Defense mechanisms ===
The ego balances demands of the id, the superego, and of reality to maintain a healthy state of consciousness, where there is only minimal intrapsychic conflict. It thus reacts to protect the individual from stressors and from anxiety by distorting internal or external reality to a lesser or greater extent. This prevents threatening unconscious thoughts and material from entering the consciousness. The ten different defence mechanisms initially enumerated by Anna Freud are: repression, regression, reaction formation, isolation of affect, undoing, projection, introjection, turning against the self, reversal into the opposite, and sublimation. In the same work, however, she details other manoeuvres such as identification with the aggressor and intellectualization that would later come to be considered defence mechanisms in their own right. Furthermore, this list has been greatly expanded upon by other psychoanalysts, with some authors claiming to enumerate in excess of one hundred defence mechanisms.

== Applications ==
=== Psychodynamic therapy ===
Psychoanalytic theory is often used in a form of talk therapy, more broadly known as psychodynamic therapy. Psychodynamic theory often incorporates methods that are used to treat mental health issues such as depression, anxiety disorders, eating disorders, personality disorders, as well as physical symptoms often caused by psychological distress. Research has often discovered that psychodynamic therapy resulted in effective treatment against mental health disorders in comparable success compared to other forms of psychotherapy, including strong evidence of its efficacy against some personality disorders and long-term depression.

=== Research ===
A comprehensive review by Marogna et al. (2025) of psychoanalytic theory being applied in clinical practice, research, and other areas of psychology found that ideas rooted in psychoanalysis continue to prove to be effective in psychotherapy, developing psychological theories, and interdisciplinary research. These ideas included studying unconscious processes, relationships, personality development, and emotional functioning. The review also reported applications of psychoanalytic theory in clinical research, qualitative interview methodologies, and interdisciplinary fields where psychology was involved in education, sociology, and health studies.

== Elaborations ==
=== Neo-analytic theory ===
Freud's theory and work with psychosexual development led to Neo-Analytic/Neo-Freudians who also believed in the importance of the unconscious, dream interpretations, defense mechanisms, and the integral influence of childhood experiences but had objections to the theory as well. They do not support the idea that personality development stops at age 6. Instead, they believe development spreads across the lifespan. They extended Freud's work and encompassed more influence from the environment and the importance of conscious thought and the unconscious. The most important theorists are Erik Erikson (Psychosocial Development), Anna Freud, Carl Jung, Alfred Adler and Karen Horney, and including the school of object relations. Erikson's Psychosocial Development theory is based on eight stages of development. The stages are trust vs. mistrust, autonomy vs. shame, initiative vs. guilt, industry vs. inferiority, identity vs. confusion, intimacy vs. isolation, generatively vs. stagnation, and integrity vs. despair. These are important to the psychoanalytic theory because they describe the different stages that people go through in life. Each stage has a major impact on their life outcomes since they are going through conflicts at each stage and whichever route they decide to take, will have certain outcomes.

=== Lacanian theory ===
Throughout the mid-to-late twentieth century, French psychoanalyst Jacques Lacan advanced his own theoretical system under the guise of a "return to Freud". His reading of Freud was influenced by Hegelianism and structuralism.

For Lacan, human experience is structured through three interrelated registers: the Imaginary, Symbolic, and Real. The self emerges through the mirror stage, where the ego is formed by identifying with an external image. Subjectivity is then shaped by language, social relations, and the desire of the Other. Together, these ideas present the human subject driven by a persistent sense of lack.

=== Application to the arts and humanities ===
Psychoanalytic theory is a major influence in Continental philosophy and in aesthetics in particular. Freud is sometimes considered a philosopher. Lacan, Michel Foucault, and Jacques Derrida, have written extensively on how psychoanalysis informs philosophical analysis. Other philosophers such as Alain Badiou and Rafael Holmberg have argued that the meaning of psychoanalysis for philosophy was not immediately clear, but that they have come to reciprocally define each other.

When analyzing literary texts, the psychoanalytic theory is sometimes used (often specifically with regard to the motives of the author and the characters) to reveal purported concealed meanings or to inform an understanding of the author's intentions.

=== Feminist psychoanalytic theory ===
Feminist psychoanalytic theory explores how unconscious processes, early childhood experiences, and symbolic structures shape gender identity and relations of power, while critically reworking Freud’s ideas to account for women’s subjectivity. It emphasizes how patriarchal culture inscribes difference through language, desire, and family dynamics, often focusing on the role of the mother, the formation of sexual identity, and the symbolic order that privileges masculinity.

Thinkers in this tradition believe that psychoanalysis can reveal the deep psychological mechanisms that sustain gender inequality and open possibilities for the transformation of cultural norms. Notably, Shulamith Firestone called Freudianism "the misguided feminism", and Juliet Mitchell argued in Psychoanalysis and Feminism that "psychoanalysis is not a recommendation for a patriarchal society, but an analysis of one".

=== Object Relations Theory ===
Object relations theory is a major development within the psychoanalytic theory school of thought. It emphasizes the role that early relationships have in shaping one's personality. Rather than focusing primarily on instinctual drives, object relations theorists argue that individuals typically internalize experiences with significant caregivers. This leads to creating mental representations that influence emotions, relationships, and self-concept later in life.

=== Attachment Theory and Psychoanalysis ===
Attachment theory emerged from psychoanalytic ideas. Similarly to object relations theory, attachment theory proposes that early relationships with caregivers play a central role in personality development and emotional functioning. Research in attachment theory has provided empirical support for psychoanalytic concepts by way of demonstrating how secure childhood attachments and insecure childhood attachments can shape relationships, emotional regulation, and personalities later in life.

=== Ego Psychology ===
Ego psychology is a school of psychoanalytic thought that emphasizes the adaptive functions of the ego. This includes reality testing, affect regulation, problem-solving, and judgment abilities. Contemporary theorists have argued that an expanded ego psychology can serve as a unifying framework for integrating diverse psychoanalytic traditions while connecting psychoanalytic theory with findings from psychology and neuroscience.

=== Self Psychology ===
Self psychology was developed by the late Heinz Kohut and focuses on the development of a cohesive sense of self through empathetic and supportive relationships. This theory proposes that healthy psychological development and interpersonal functioning is contingent and determined by external recognition, validation, and emotional understanding.

=== Relational Psychoanalysis ===
Relational psychoanalysis emphasizes the mutual influence of a patient and their analyst within the therapy situation. This approach suggests that psychological change occurs through meaningful and significant interpersonal interactions, emotional engagement, and the exploration of recurring relationship patterns in both past and present relationships.

== Criticisms ==
Some claim that the theory is lacking in empirical data and too focused on pathology. Other criticisms are that the theory lacks consideration of culture and its influence on personality.

Psychoanalytic theory comes from Freud and is focused on childhood. This might be an issue since most believe studying children can be inconclusive. One major concern lies in if observed personality will be a lifelong occurrence or if the child will shed it later in life.

Some critics also argue that assessing the effectiveness of psychoanalytic theory in practice remains difficult as psychodynamic treatments typically encompass a broad range of methods and approaches. This makes identifying and quantifying specific mechanisms responsible for therapeutic change a challenge. In addition to these challenges, some scholars question the claims of psychoanalytic methods having unique benefits when psychodynamic therapies typically have comparable outcomes to other established forms of psychotherapy.

== See also ==
- Freud's psychoanalytic theories
- Metapsychology
