= Stress-related disorders =

Category of mental disorders

Stress-related disorders constitute a category of mental disorders. They are maladaptive, biological and psychological responses to short- or long-term exposures to physical or emotional stressors. The National Institute of Environmental Health Sciences categorizes obsessive–compulsive disorder (OCD) and post-traumatic stress disorder (PTSD) as stress-related disorders. However, the World Health Organization's ICD-11 excludes OCD but categorizes PTSD, complex post-traumatic stress disorder (CPTSD), and adjustment disorder as stress-related disorders.

== Stress ==
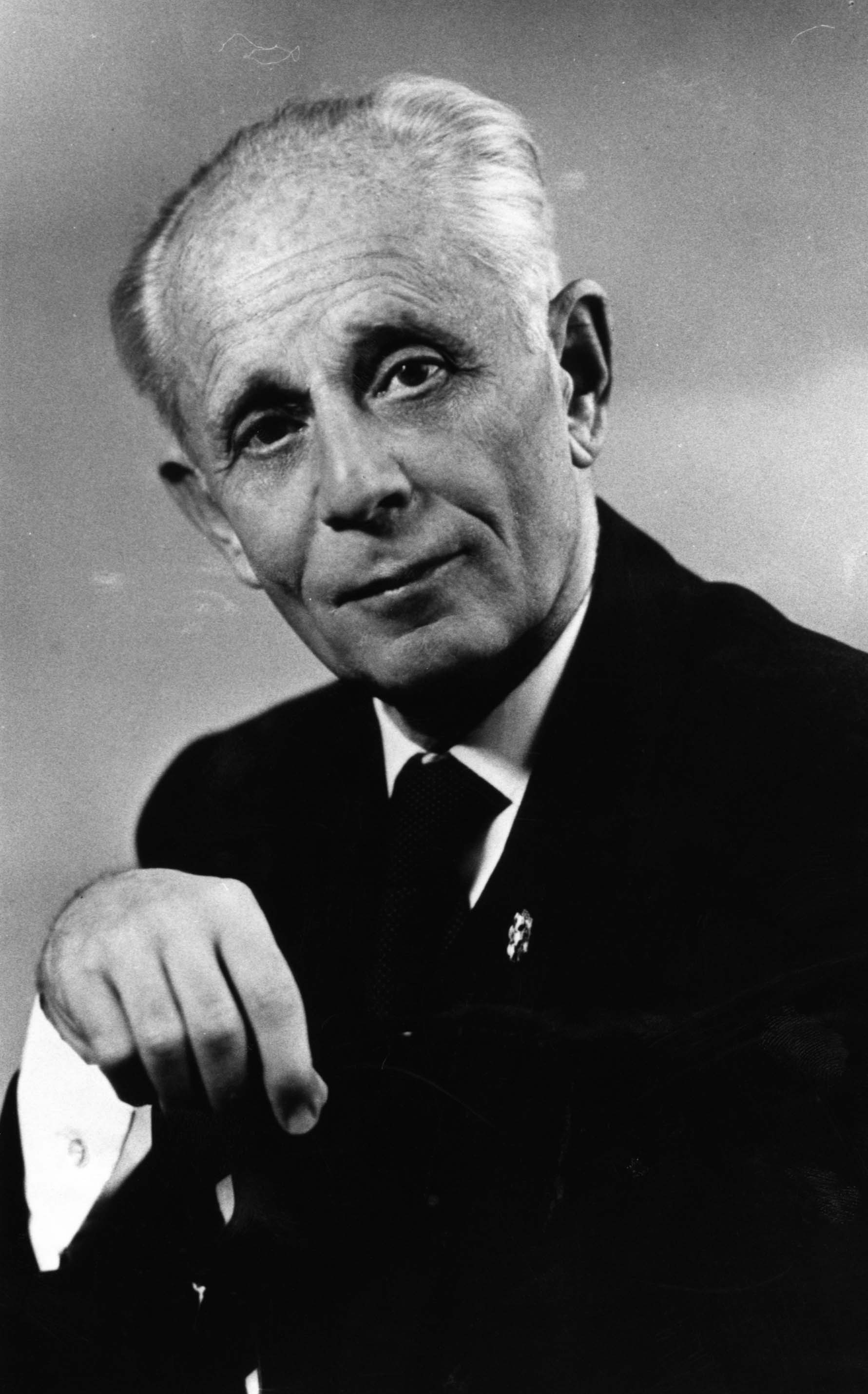
Hungarian-Canadian Endocrinologist Hans Selye

Stress was first defined by the Hungarian-Canadian endocrinologist Hans Selye in 1936 as "the non-specific response of the body to any demand for change". It is a psychological process initiated by events that threaten, harm or challenge an organism, or that exceed available coping resources. Often times it is a result of mental, physical or emotional disturbances that have the potential to alter brain function. Long-term alterations have a tendency to develop into stress-related disorders like PTSD, CPTSD, or dissociative disorders.

Stress is wear and tear on the body in response to stressful agents. Selye called such agents: stressors, which are physical, physiological or sociocultural. Stress-related disorders differ from anxiety disorders, and do not constitute a normative concept.

A person may typically endure stress when experiencing positive or negative events (e.g., threatening), which could temporarily strain or overwhelm adaptive capacities. Stress is highly individualized and depends on variables such as the novelty, rate, intensity, duration, personal interpretation of the input, and genetic or experiential factors.

== Stress-reduction strategies ==
Stress-reduction strategies can be helpful to many stressed/anxious people. However, many anxious persons cannot concentrate enough to use such strategies effectively for acute relief. (Most stress-reduction techniques have their greatest utility as elements of a prevention plan that attempts to raise one's threshold to anxiety-provoking experiences.)

=== The five Rs of stress and anxiety reduction ===
Five core concepts are used to reduce anxiety or stress.

- Recognition of the causes and sources of the threat or distress; education and consciousness raising.
- Relationships identified for support, help, reassurance
- Removal (from or of) the threat or stressor; managing the stimulus.
- Relaxation through techniques such as meditation, massage, breathing exercises, or imagery.
- Re-engagement through managed re-exposure and desensitization.

== Defenses ==
Defense mechanisms are behavior patterns primarily concerned with protecting ego. Presumably the process is unconscious and the aim is to fool oneself. It is intra psychic processes serving to provide relief from emotional conflict and anxiety. Conscious efforts are frequently made for the same reasons, but true defense mechanisms are unconscious.

Some of the common defense mechanisms are: compensation, conversion, denial, displacement, dissociation, idealization, identification, incorporation, introjection, projection, rationalization, reaction formation, regression, sublimation, substitution, symbolization, and undoing.

=== Summary ===
The major function of these psychological defenses is to prevent the experiencing of painful emotions. There are several major problems with their use.

- Many of these defenses create new problems that are as bad, or worse, than the emotional problems they mask. Some may be just plain destructive. Example: rejection literally destroys the relationships we care most about.
- These defenses distort a person's ability to perceive reality as it is. And this prevents them from dealing with their problems in a constructive way.
- These defenses do not get rid of the painful feelings. In fact, by masking them so that person doesn't feel them, they effectively store them up within themselves. Emotions are discharged through expression, so by denying themselves the chance to feel them, they also deny themselves the ability to get rid of them.
- These defenses do not just screen out painful emotions. They are, in fact, defenses against all emotion. So the more effective person's defenses become in protecting them from painful feelings, the less able they are to experience the joyful and happy feelings that make life worth living.
- These defenses are not perfect. As more and more hurt is stored away, a tension is developed. Person becomes increasingly anxious, nervous, and irritable. They become emotionally unpredictable. And when defenses weaken, from time to time, person may experience emotional explosions.
- These defenses prevent person from knowing what is wrong, but they do not prevent us from feeling bad.

== Types of stress-related disorders ==
=== Acute stress disorder ===
Acute stress disorder occurs in individuals without any other apparent psychiatric disorder, in response to exceptional physical or psychological stress. While intense, such reactions usually subside within hours or days. The stress may be an overwhelming traumatic experience (e.g., accident, battle, physical assault, rape) or unusually sudden change in social circumstances of the individual, such as multiple bereavement. Individual vulnerability and resilience play a role in the occurrence and severity of acute stress reactions, as evidenced by the fact that not all people exposed to exceptional stress develop symptoms. In diagnosis, acute stress disorder is categorized a trauma- and stressor-related disorder (formerly classified under anxiety disorders).

==== Symptoms ====
Symptoms show considerable variation but usually include: An initial state of "DAZE" with some constriction of the field of consciousness and narrowing of attention, inability to comprehend stimuli, disorientation. Followed either by further withdrawal from the surrounding situation to the extent of a dissociative stupor or by agitating and over activity.

==== Autonomic signs of "panic anxiety" ====
The signs are: tachycardia (increased heart rate), sweating, hyperventilation (increased breathing). The symptoms usually appear within minutes of the impact of the stressful stimulus and disappear within 2–3 days.

=== Post-traumatic stress disorder (PTSD) ===
This disorder arises after response to a stressful event or situation of an exceptionally threatening nature and likely to cause pervasive distress (great pain, anxiety, sorrow, acute physical or mental suffering, affliction, trouble).

==== Causes ====
The causes of PTSD are: natural or human disasters, war, serious accident, witness of violent death of others, violent attack, being the survivor of sexual abuse, rape, torture, terrorism or hostage taking.

The predisposing factors are: personality traits and previous history of psychiatric illness.

==== Typical symptoms ====
Flashbacks are the repeated reliving of the trauma in the form of intrusive memories or dreams. Intense distress at exposure to events that symbolize or resemble an aspect of the traumatic event, including anniversaries of the trauma; avoidance of activities and situations reminiscent of the trauma; emotional blunting or "numbness"; a sense of detachment from other people; autonomic hyper-arousal with hyper-vigilance; an enhanced startle reaction and insomnia; marked anxiety and depression, and occasionally, suicidal ideation.

==== Treatment ====
Psychiatric consultation: exploration of memories of the traumatic event, relief of associated symptoms and counseling.

==== Prognosis ====
The course is fluctuating but recovery can be expected in the majority of cases. Few people may show chronic course over many years and a transition to an enduring personality change

== See also ==
- Critical incident stress management
- Stress management
- Stress (biology)
