= The Real =

Philosophical category of inexpressible reality

In continental philosophy, the Real refers to reality in its unmediated form. In Lacanian psychoanalysis, it is an "impossible" category because of its inconceivability and opposition to expression.

== In depth psychology ==
The Real is the intelligible form of the horizon of truth of the field-of-objects that has been disclosed. As the Real Order of the Borromean knot in Lacanianism, it is opposed in the unconscious to the Imaginary, which encompasses fantasy, dreams and hallucinations. In depth psychology, the Real can be described as a "negative space", analogous to a "black hole", a philosophical void of sociality and subjectivity, a traumatic consensus of intersubjectivity, or as an absolute noumenalness between signifiers. Lewis states that the Real can be a presence or is a substance and cites Derrida's claim that the real is authenticity.

Complete understanding, as in [,on the one hand,] the resolution after the period of mourning, represents [,on the other hand,] clear arrival at the Spinozan “impossible”.

— Ian S. Miller

Even the word 'trace' is an appropriation of the real. [...] ' Writing is one of the representatives of the trace in general, it is not the trace itself. The trace itself does not exist [Derrida’s italics]. [...] (OG: 167, my italics)'[.]

— Michael Lewis

Jacques Lacan defines the Real as a plenum, a nature beyond culture that is contradistinct from the ontic. The Lacanian real is a section of the triadic, Borromean knot: the Imaginary, the Symbolic, and the Real; the center of the knot is the sinthome (monad-soul).

=== Thing-ness ===
Felluga states that Bill Brown's Thing is conceptually close to the Real, as it is a type of unreliableness of the relation between subject and object that is neither subject nor object.

The Real is reality in its unmediated form. It is what disrupts the subject’s received notions about himself and the world around him. [...] as a shattering enigma, because in order to make sense of it he or she will have to [...] find signifiers that can ensure its control.

— Judith Gurewich

=== Discourse of the subject ===
The drive divides the subject, who uses masters signifiers to cover up this lack, which will produce narratives.

— Dries G. M. Dulsster

A master signifier (S1) organizes narrative (S2): a defensive form of discourse that is an ideological reaction to the Real: i.e., mythic explanation, hero's journey, storytelling, theme, pathos, ethos, plot, conflict, closure. The real subject (as id) is repressed (via aphanisis) by the imaginary-signified ego's ideologizing overtop of the real instincts. Narrative speech (parole) is an attempt to resolve the Real-Imaginary aporia (langue) concerning events.

==== Psychotic discourse ====
Felluga states that Ernesto Laclau and Chantal Mouffe's term antagonism, as a societal limit that sits outside of society's articulation, functions similarly to the Real.

The therapist who feels threatened – threatened by excessive certainty, by excess beyond reason, by a discourse they do not understand, by activity that is not addressed to them or by a client who tries to take their place – might well be driven mad.

— Ian Parker (psychologist)

Hurst states that, in principle, self-analysis (analyst's discourse) might prevent an analyst from retrogressing to the ideological position of the master's discourse (i.e., King in The Purloined Letter).

The crucial difficulty in self-analysis lies not in these fields but in the emotional factors that blind us to unconscious forces. That the main difficulty is emotional rather than intellectual is confirmed by the fact that when analysts analyze themselves they have not such a great advantage over the layman as we would be inclined to believe.

— Karen Horney

==== The phallic signifier and castration ====
The ineffable, unary signifier of lack (phallus) stitches the unconscious drives to jouissance, dialectically bridging language and desire (logos and eros, the Apollonian and the Dionysian).

===== Drives =====
Barthes reflects that the inner voice of the subject is structured in a triad of "Presence" (frustration) created by the maternal Other, "Intermittence" (castration anxiety) over the loss of the phallus as an imaginary object taken by the real father, and "Absence" (privation) that occurs from losing the phallus from the imaginary father; (symbolic desire separates from real need and becomes imaginary demand) (q.v., Lacan's graph of desire).

==== In neurosis ====
Hurst argues that the Lacanian Real parallels Derrida's concept of différance. Lewis states that lalangue is the arche-writing repetition that reveals the real subject through différance. Guattari states that temporal différance is secreted from obsessional neurosis.

===== Hysteric's discourse =====
The hysteric's discourse is driven by the Real, where object (a) is at an impossible-to-find truth. Neither individuation nor differentiation can happen in the stagnancy of the Real.

The three categories of hysteria – conversion hysteria, anxiety hysteria, and traumatic hysteria – have a basis in alienation, with an identification to those-without-the-phallus, and a self-sacrifice through displacement. Hurst states that masculine libidinal hysteria breaches the paranoid-schizoid position of masculine fanaticism by attempting to make the Real appear, whereas feminine libidinal hysteria breaches the Nietzschean radical nihilism of Hegel's "eternal irony" by resisting the Symbolic Order.

====== Artistic discourse ======
Artistic discourse is a pneuma of neurosis-psychosis hallucinatory hysteria, a poetic-real microcosm of the True-Real.

[T]he fantasm of a devouring orality or of a return to the maternal breast refers to a mother who is neither real, imaginary, nor symbolic but who is cosmic becoming; it is a Universe of processual emergence as much as of abolition. For all that, we are not in the reign of Jungian universal Imagos or mythological entities such as Gaia or Chronos. The Universes of which the mouth and the breast are the refrain-operators are constellated in a composite and heterogenetic way: they constitute singular events.

— Félix Guattari

The artist's sense of truth. [...] he does not want to give up the most effective presuppositions of his art: the fantastic, mythical, uncertain, extreme, the sense for the symbolic, the overestimation of the person, the faith in some miraculous element in the genius.

— Friedrich Nietzsche

==== Signs of the real ====
The objet petit a is what falls from the subject in anxiety.

— Lacan

These objects a take shape as the consequence of repressions, disguises, dissociations, fragmentations, deflections, intellectualizations, reductions, displacements, and discussions, which [...] cover over, and point to, the fact that the traumatic event cannot be assimilated [...] The Real [...] "appears" as failures, ruptures, and inconsistencies caused by the tuché.

— Andrea Hurst

Tuché is an Aristotelian-borrowed term to describe the traumatic encounter-kernel of the Real and automaton to describe the repetitive transference process of symbolizing the Real.

Although the encircling of the Real (Lacan) or constellations (Adorno) tells us that we can never truly grasp the object, our approaching it from different angles of contextual perspectives takes place through a thinking subject who draws on concepts.

— Claudia Leeb

The Symbolic introduces "a cut in the Real" in the process of signification: "it is the world of words that creates the world of things." Thus the Real emerges as that which is outside language, making it "that which resists symbolization absolutely". The logos of the Symbolic creates the Order of the Real; the Real and kairos divide the logos, resist symbolization, and anticipate being symbolized.

Signifiers of this experience are Lacan's jouissance, Marx's theory of alienation, the numinous, psychological trauma, transcendence, the sublime or a fractured ideology; particularly, it can be a narrative that separates signifiers from conscious desire-quest (i.e., narcissistic injury).

[T]he real[...]is always in its place[...][the symbolic] carries it glued to its [metaphorical shoe] heel[.] [...] The real is without fissure. [...] There is no absence [or pleasure principle ] in the real [, concerning Freud's reality principle ].

— Lacan

===== Jouissance =====
Julia Kristeva, particularly in her 1980 essay Powers of Horror, posits that the super-ego's abjection facilitates a subjective traumatic limit between subject and objects, with the Real, through ego-object loss and castration of surplus jouissance. Hurst references Žižek: for any event that converges on a collapsed Symbolic Order, is a where Antigone becomes the Thing. Lacanian Being-for-death is a death drive for its telos (i.e., sublimity).

Suicide is really intended as egocide. [...] if one loses this sense of connectedness [to other egos] [...] the foundation of interconnectedness, is described as 'empty' or 'nothing,' and at the same time as an infinite, 'non-empty' world.

— Hayao Kawai

===== Unreal vs Real(2) =====
The unreal-unnameable organ called a lamella (or libido as a symbiotic, pre-Oedipal, pre-symbolic Real(1) before-signified-who-ness) is distinct from the Real(2) after-signifier-what-ness, which a subject experiences at the limits of the Imaginary and Symbolic. Real(1) is a continuous, "whole" reality that is undivided by language, while Real(2) is the space of the possibility of abjection being raised wherever there is interference in the path of the object of the ego, including the experience of surplus jouissance which threatens to surpass a subject's boundaries; Kristeva remarks that this experience "takes the ego back to its source", i.e., the id.

[O]bject shadows or things of emergence—contents of the first Yonder from which a first Here conceives itself [...] Objects that, like those we have named, are not objects because they have no subject-like counterpart, are referred to by Macho as "nobjects": they are spherically surrounding mini-conditions envisaged by a non-facing self, namely the fetal pre-subject[.]

— Peter Sloterdijk

===== Somatization =====
The real is the difference between a right glove inside out and a left glove (cf. SXIV: 19/4/67).

— Michael Lewis paraphrasing Lacan

Malcolm Bowie interprets the Lacanian real as ineffable (i.e., uncanny).

==== Historical materialism ====
Fredric Jameson interprets Lacan's real through a Marxist-Hegelian lens as meaning "History itself", a narrative symptom of the event.

==== In afro-pessimism ====
Marriott examines Fanon: white people's gaze and dehumanization of black people through objectification, creating a desire for the absent object-of-identity in marginalized individuals that is destroyed through racist signification. George states that race is an objet a confrontation with jouissance and lack. George posits that the history of slavery in the United States and racism are within the Real (e.g., Beloved). Crockett references W. E. B. Du Bois in relation to a Real critique of the Symbolic through a point of view from the angle of double consciousness.

==== Sinthome ====
In practice, Lacanian psychoanalysis derives the event by gazing at the resistance and transference to identify the automaton mechanisms of the Thing (viz., foreclosure, repression, and disavowal) that are utilized to anamorphosically read where the signifiers are hiding the symptomatic objet petit (a), rendering the real subject.

Lacan finds in this sublimated image [of the object-as-Thing] the function of an Até, the 'divinization' of a 'limit' that simultaneously draws us toward and keeps us a safe distance from that which 'represents the disqualification of all concepts,' that which represents the void of the 'empty' Real (262).

— Sheldon George

===== Subject-as-metaphor =====
The subject is always the missing signifier, the lack of a signifier, 'the subject is literally at his beginning the elision of a signifier as such, the missing signifier in the chain' (SVII:224). The barred subject, the essence of the human being of desire, can then only exist in the bar [of Signifier/signified].

— Michael Lewis citing Lacan

In the ordinary way, the study of "real" (i.e. social) space is referred to specialists and their respective specialties – to geographers, town-planners, and sociologists. As for knowledge of "true" (i.e. mental) space, it is supposed to fall within the province of the mathematicians and philosophers. Here we have a double or even multiple error. To begin with, the split between "real" and "true" serves only to avoid any confrontation between practice and theory, between lived experience and concepts, so that both sides of these dualities are distorted from the outset.

— Henri Lefebvre

Lacan links the processes of displacement with metonymy and those of condensation with metaphor. [...] the process of realization of the subject parallels the action of metaphor that displaces literal levels of meaning in its production of new meaning.

— James DiCenso

When Pascal writes: the eternal silence of these infinite spaces terrifies me, he speaks as an unbeliever, not as a believer.

— Jean-Paul Sartre

The void is what the subject finds through interrogation of oneself. The subject existentially navigates an inward, metaphorical and vacuous desert or ocean, unguided by the psychoanalytic metaphor of God's "Original Presence". Premodern philosophers also thought up a formless chora, a pre-universal "chaos", and the experience of horror vacui; these conceptions of an unguided ego confronting the void informed psychoanalysis. It prefigured Lacan's outline of how the subject-as-metaphor, later the analysand, encounters the Real and how this experience is slated in analysis to give rise to pathologies, particularly anxieties and traumas. In psychoanalysis, the subject appears either as transference, repression or as the barrier separating the signifier over the signified. Subjective experience is a paradoxical extension inseparable from the experience of place, landscape, and body, which can be conveyed as utopia, dystopia, or pantheon.

Philosophers reveal the Real engulfing the ego in a comparatively unfamiliar and defamiliarizing space, and the subject's dystonic feelings of confrontation. The geographical self as described in human geography, or alternatively the "makanthropos" as described by Schopenhauer, feels Cartesian anxiety, a confusion of certainty in reason, from the experience of this formless void.

Consider Heidegger's example of the shoemaker's workshop as a totality of equipment—hammers, needles, and the like. The in-order-to "is constitutive for the equipment" [...] The toward-which of the equipment is the "work to be produced", (p. 99), in this case, shoes [and, ipso facto, shoe heels ].

— Robert D. Stolorow

===== Resistance =====
An impasse is the resistance between the real and the imaginary that affects the therapeutic alliance, wherein the client is at odds with the Transcendent Function of the therapist's mind as mediation to the Symbolic Order by way of the Signifier-as-God (i.e., discrepancy). Analysis reveals the kernel at the core of the Real through resistance. The finite ego resists the unconscious's infinite lattice of signifiers.

===== Passe =====
[A] God is something one encounters in the real, inaccessible. It is indicated by what doesn’t deceive—anxiety. [...] God is the supreme Being. I equals Being.

— Lacan

Lacan gave the name passe to the analysand's dualistic experience of uncertainty, becoming eclipsed and challenged by a subjective confrontation, that gives way to a feeling of certainty with the Real, e.g. in the temptation of Christ or the desolation of saints; it is "the moment of crisis in a speaking cure in which all subjectivity, the last imaginary residue [of the ego], all self-love falls away" and is replaced by acceptance from the analyst.

There is a 'barrier' of repression between Signifiers (the unconscious mind: 'discourse of the Other') and the signified […] a 'chain' of signifiers is analogous to the 'rings of a necklace that is a ring in another necklace made of rings' […] 'The signifier is that which [paternal metaphor] represents a subject for another signifier'.

— Lacan, paraphrased

Michael Eigen states that a paradox of faith comes from subject-attacking-object (such as in Jung's Answer to Job). The Real, as analogized as an aporia in experience or an encompassing black hole of reality, relates to the Jungian archetype of the Death Mother, the shadow of the Mother archetype, articulated in Neumann's The Great Mother.

The agony of breaking through personal limitations is the agony of spiritual growth. Art, literature, myth and cult, philosophy, and ascetic disciplines are instruments to help the individual past his limiting horizons into spheres of ever-expanding realization. [...] Finally, the mind breaks the bounding sphere of the cosmos to a realization of transcending all experience of form—all symbolizations, all divinities: a realization of the ineluctable void.

— Joseph Campbell

The becoming produced under therapy sessions can lead to an ineffable and oceanic experience of the Thing (White interpreting Bion, Eigen, Ogden); the analyst in the Bion school seeks to be an empty container, or empty subject of the void, of the client's projections.

====== The real as one-ness ======
Lerner states that Spinoza's God may be interpreted as the real, with the attribute of Thought as the symbolic. François Laruelle posits the Real as an immanent One.

The experience of the Void is the unbeliever's mystic temptation, his possibility for prayer, his moment of plenitude. At our limits, a God appears, or something that serves his turn.

— Emil Cioran

== Interpretations of the Real ==
What has been [, under primary repression,] foreclosed [via the un-barred subject's repudiation of the Name-of-the-Father and phallus] from the Symbolic[,] reappears in the Real.

— Jacques Lacan

In my reading, a convergence occurs between Heidegger's term 'refusal' (Verweigerung) and the Freudian 'foreclosure' (Verwerfung).

— Clayton Crockett

With Muller, psychosis has no word-thing symbolic mediation: figurative communications function as reified Real objects (e.g., projective identification and bizarre objects). Marriott states that foreclosure is directly connected to ressentiment. Brenner cites Laurent, claiming autistic foreclosure leads to Real castration through manifesting a synthetic mOther (The Death of the Author or barring the subject), as opposed to Symbolic castration within an organic nomos; this existential crisis could theoretically lead to the emergence of a schizoid personality style (dissociation, isolation, and intellectualization); q.v., enantiodromia. Under autistic foreclosure, the autistic subject is un-barred, wherein the signifier feels Real (q.v., synesthesia).

In this joiner, Lacan tells us, "the subject can achieve nothing but some form of psychosis or perversion," where this psychosis is marked precisely by a fullness, in the presences of the Real, that eliminates the dimension of desire and all subjective aspirations (301).

— Sheldon George

One crucial way in which Derrida describes the real is as an 'event' (évenément, an eventuating or occurrence). The absolute outside of the text [or, the real other] was named by Derrida from the very start as 'the unnameable' (OG: 14). [...] [O]ne can see that any understanding of the real as presence and as a transcendental signified will import a determination from something that has resulted from the real into the real itself.

— Michael Lewis

Leeb conjectures that Theodor W. Adorno's concept of the non-identical and Lacan's Real fall under immanent critique.

=== In schizoanalysis ===
[ Baruch Spinoza ] recognize[s] only three, or primary, affects: joy, sadness, and desire [and Deleuze interprets desire as the "reflection, derivation, and correlation" of the set of ideas that represent "all power" that "is inseparable from a capacity for being affected"].

In critical overviews of the work of Gilles Deleuze and Félix Guattari, the Real has been identified, particularly in readings of A Thousand Plateaus, as the plane of defamiliarized and deterritorialized empty signifiers that approach the uncanny valley, destroyed signs of an imploding gaze, and a-temporal semiotic black holes of faciality. In both the construction and destruction of the "face", a system that "brings together a despotic wall of interconnected signifiers and passional black holes of subjective absorption", there is a split in subjectivity and a confrontation with the Real. The uncanny, the plane of empty signifiers, is found in relations between intersections of the interior-self and exterior-Other, a "return of the repressed" as an eternal return of the path of the objet petit a that disturbs familiarity and further deterritorializes the subject.

Guattari, who throughout the development of his philosophy was critical of Lacan, wrote in the 1979 essay "Logos or Abstract Machines?" that:

[T]here is no meta-language here. The collective assemblage of enunciation speaks "on the same level" as states of affairs, states of facts, and subjective states. There is not, on the one hand, a subject that speaks in the "void" and, on the other hand, an object that would be spoken in the "plenum." The void and the plenum are "engineered" by the same deterritorialization effect.

When the monad-soul finds inner stability, the autopoietic objet petit a does not lead to introjection (oral stage) nor projection (anal stage): this state is the body without organs, a virtuality of becoming within the plane of immanence. The real is a diagrammatic virtuality of reality (or Nature), onticly surpassing all regimes of signs by the merging of content and expression in the body without organs.

=== Modalities of the Real in Žižek ===
As I see it, Derrida’s recourse to 'incoherence' is analogous to what Žižek understands by the Lacanian Real.

— Andrea Hurst

Slavoj Žižek divides the gist of the Lacanian Real into "three modalities":

- The "symbolic Real" (Phallus): signifier of signification, Lacan's impossible "Other of the Other"
  - symbolic historicity (Clotho) perpetually quilting the chain of signifiers (Lachesis) with a new master signifier (Atropos); i.e., dialectically ideological narrative-punctuation (hermeneutic circle/monad): when kairos castrates the logos with the Real.
- The "imaginary Real" (Objet petit a): Lewis states that real-traces of each signifier are rendered intelligible through the no-image signified
  - a parallax-ic ego-split, deriving an ego-ideal object (a '), creating a poetic-real mental image of horror and terror, deriving the uncanny: méconnaissance.
- The "real Real" (Event): a semiotic negative-image object (e.g., woodblock printing), neither symbolic signifier nor imaginary signified
  - a fissure of the Symbolic; an absence-of-absence (~~p); a reified psychological projection, sublimated as a Thing (viz., transference-object, analysand, identification, and nondualism).

Lewis states that the real-of-the-symbolic is the letter (referenced in Lacan's schemas), and the real-of-the-imaginary is objet petit a.

Žižek cites, as literary examples of the Real which he identifies as "the primordial abyss which swallows everything, dissolving all identities", the eldritch experience of Pip in the ocean in Herman Melville's Moby-Dick, regression and the repetition compulsion of characterological desire in death drive within Poe's Maelström, and the climax of Joseph Conrad's Heart of Darkness where Kurtz is in the throes of death. Meanwhile, in his use of film analysis, Žižek states that the real Real can be found in The Full Monty and surreptitiously in The Sound of Music.

Glyn Daly also provided a further elaboration of Žižek's three modalities through his pre-established examples from pop culture:

The real Real is the hard limit that functions as the horrifying Thing (the Alien, Medusa's head, maelstrom and so on) - a shattering force of negation. The symbolic Real refers to the anonymous symbols and codes (scientific formulae, digitalisation, empty signifiers...) that function in an indifferent manner as the abstract "texture" onto which, or out of which, reality is constituted. In The Matrix, for example, the symbolic Real is given expression at the point where Neo perceives "reality" in terms of the abstract streams of digital output. In the contemporary world, Žižek argues that it is capital itself that provides this essential backdrop to our reality and as such represents the symbolic Real of our age. With the "imaginary real" we have precisely the (unsustainable) dimension of fantasmatic excess-negation that is explored in Flatliners. This is why cyberspace is such an ambiguous imaginary realm.

== Notable figures ==
- Louis Althusser
- Alain Badiou
- Georges Bataille
- Simone de Beauvoir
- Maurice Blanchot
- Ray Brassier
- Lorenzo Chiesa
- Sigmund Freud
- Bruce Fink (psychoanalyst)
- Heraclitus
- Julia Kristeva
- Philippe Lacoue-Labarthe
- Jean Laplanche
- François Laruelle
- Serge Leclaire
- Jean-Luc Nancy
- Friedrich Nietzsche
- Parmenides
- Jean-Bertrand Pontalis
- Otto Rank
- Naomi Schor
- Evelyn Underhill

== See also ==
- Anomie
- Capacity to be alone
- Characterology
- Chronotope
- Complex post-traumatic stress disorder
- Condensation (psychology)
- Écriture féminine
- Ergo Proxy
  - List of Ergo Proxy characters
- Installation art
- Intellectualization
- Kyoto School
- Logocentrism
- Materiality (social sciences and humanities)
- Mentalization
- Metaphysics of presence
- Nothing
- Object relations theory
- 'Pataphysics
- Perennial philosophy
- Phallocentrism
- Philosophical zombie
- Physis
- Pragmatism
- Process philosophy
- Psychodynamics
- Psychogeography
- Psychonautics
- Quietism (philosophy)
- Reification (fallacy)
- Repetition (Kierkegaard book)
- Shadow (psychology)
- Social organism
- Sociology of space
- Socratic method
- Triadic signs
- Textuality
- Trichotomy (philosophy)
- What Is It Like to Be a Bat?
