= Freud's psychoanalytic theories =

Look to unconscious drives to explain human behavior

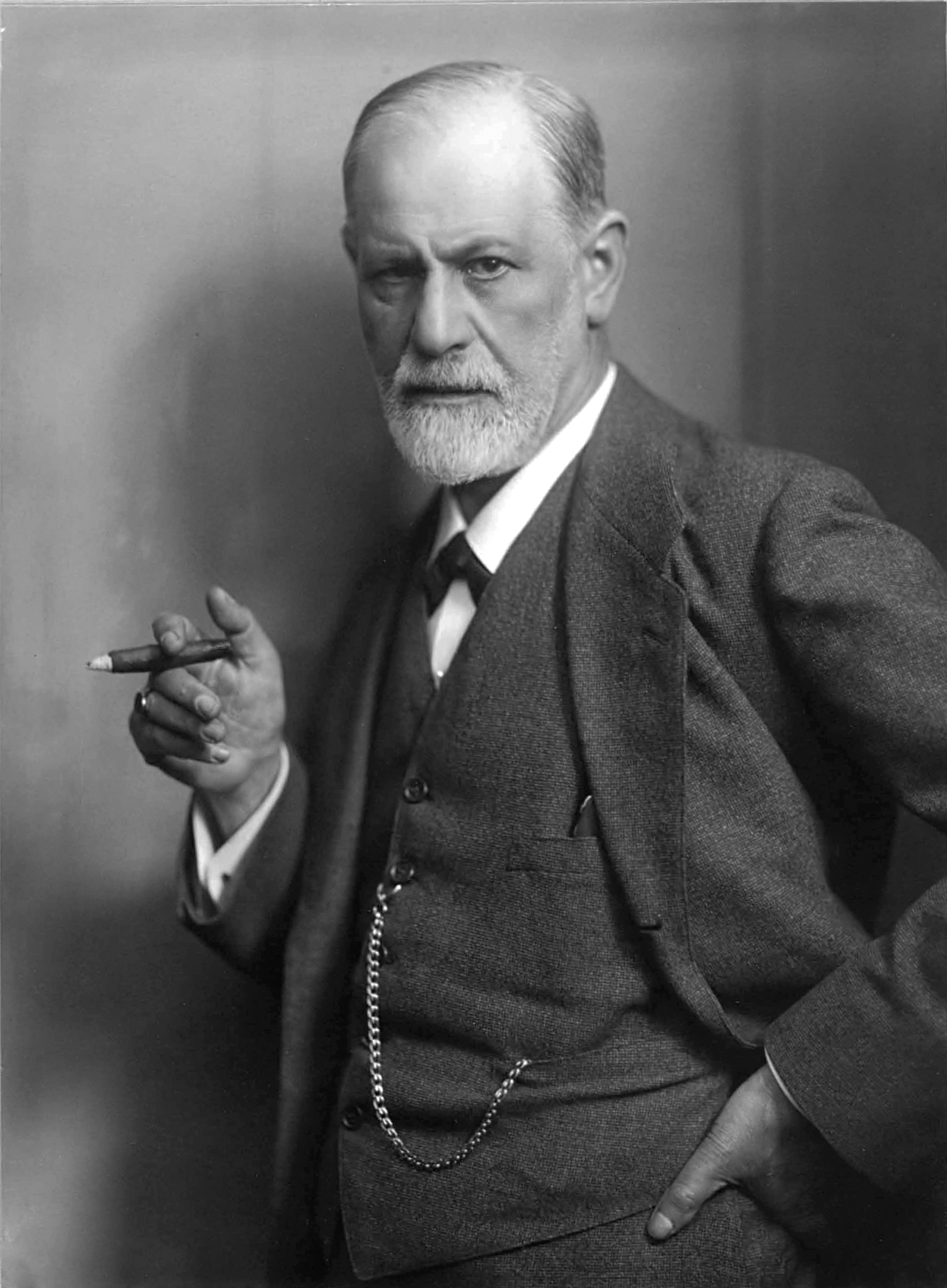
Sigmund Freud (c. 1921)

Sigmund Freud (6 May 1856 – 23 September 1939) is considered to be the founder of the psychodynamic approach to psychology, which looks to unconscious drives to explain human behavior. Freud believed that the mind is responsible for both conscious and unconscious decisions that it makes on the basis of psychological drives. The id, ego, and super-ego are three aspects of the mind Freud believed to comprise a person's personality. Freud believed people are "simply actors in the drama of [their] own minds, pushed by desire, pulled by coincidence. Underneath the surface, our personalities represent the power struggle going on deep within us".

== Views on religion ==
Freud did not believe in a supernatural force that pre-programmed humankind to behave in a certain way. His idea of the Id explains why humans act out in certain ways when it is not in line with the ego or superego: "Religion is an illusion and it derives its strength from the fact that it falls in with our instinctual desires." Freud believed that humans rely on religion to give explanations for anxieties and tensions they do not want to believe in consciously. Freud argued that humanity created God in its image. This reverses the idea of religion, as he believed the mind constructs it. The role of the mind is a topic Freud repeatedly discussed, as he believed it is responsible for both conscious and unconscious decisions driven by forces and drives. The idea that religion causes individuals to behave morally is incorrect, according to Freud, because he believed no other force has the power to control how humans act. Unconscious desires motivate individuals to act accordingly.

Freud conducted extensive research on how individuals act and interact in group settings. He believed that humans behave differently according to the demands and constraints of the group as a whole. In his book Group Psychology and the Analysis of the Ego, Freud argued that the Christian Church—and, by extension, the Synagogue—and organized religion form an "artificial group" which requires an external force to keep it together. In this type of group, everything is dependent on that external force, and without it, the group would no longer exist. Groups are necessary, according to Freud, to decrease narcissism in society's members, by creating libidinal ties with others, by placing everyone at an equal level. The commonality among people with diverse egos allows humans to identify with one another. This relates to the idea of religion because Freud believed that humankind created religion to foster the group ties they unconsciously seek.

== Oedipus complex ==
According to Freud's many theories of religion, the Oedipus complex is utilized in the understanding and mastery of religious beliefs. In Freud's psychosexual stages, he mentioned the Oedipus complex and how it affects children and their relationships with their same-sex parental figure. According to Freud, there is an unconscious desire for one's mother to be a virgin and for one's father to be an all-powerful, almighty figure. Freud's interest in Greek mythology and religion greatly influenced his psychological theories. The Oedipus complex is when a boy is jealous of his father. The boy strives to possess his mother and ultimately replace his father as a means of no longer having to fight for her undivided attention and affection. Along with seeking his mother's love, boys also experience castration anxiety, which is the fear of losing their genitalia. Boys fear that their fathers will retaliate and castrate them as a result of desiring their mother. Females also experience penis envy, which is the parallel reaction to the male experience of castration anxiety. Females are jealous of their father's penis and wish to have one as well. Girls then repress this feeling and instead long for a child of their own. This suppression leads to the girl identifying with her mother and acquiring feminine traits.

== Psychoanalytic theory ==
Psychoanalysis was founded by Sigmund Freud. Freud believed that people could be cured by making their motivations conscious. The aim of psychoanalysis therapy is to release repressed emotions and experiences, i.e., make the unconscious conscious. Psychoanalysis is commonly used to treat depression and anxiety disorders. It is only by having a cathartic (i.e., healing) experience that a person can be helped and "cured".

=== Id ===
The Id, according to Freud, is the part of the unconscious that seeks pleasure. His idea of the Id explains why people act out in certain ways that are not in line with the Ego or Superego. The Id holds all of humankind's most basic and primal instincts. It is the impulsive, unconscious part of the mind that is based on the desire to seek immediate satisfaction. The Id does not have a grasp on any form of reality or consequence. The Id makes people engage in need-satisfying behavior without regard for right or wrong. Freud compared the Id and the Ego to a horse and a rider. The Id is the horse, which is directed and controlled by the Ego, the rider. This metaphor shows that, although the Id is supposedly controlled by the Ego, the two often interact. The Id is made up of two biological instincts, Eros, which is the drive to create, and Thanatos, which is the drive to destroy.

=== Ego ===
The Ego creates a balance between pleasure and pain. It is impossible for all desires of the Id to be met, and the Ego realizes this but continues to seek pleasure and satisfaction. Although the Ego does not know the difference between right and wrong, it is aware that not all drives can be met at a given time. The Ego operates on the reality principle to help satisfy the Id's demands while also compromising with the constraints of reality. The Ego is a person's "self", composed of unconscious desires. The Ego takes into account ethical and cultural ideals in order to balance out the desires originating in the Id. Although both the Id and the Ego are unconscious, the Ego has close contact with the perceptual system. The Ego's function is self-preservation, which is why it has the ability to control the instinctual demands from the Id.

The ego is first and foremost a bodily ego; it is not merely a surface entity but is itself the projection of a surface. If we wish to find an anatomical analogy for it we can best identify it with the 'cortical homunculus' of the anatomists, which stands on its head in the cortex, sticks up its heels, faces backwards and, as we know, has its speech-area on the left-hand side. The ego is ultimately derived from bodily sensations, chiefly from those springing from the surface of the body. It may thus be regarded as a mental projection of the surface of the body, representing the superficies of the mental apparatus.

=== Superego ===
The Superego, which develops around age four or five, incorporates the morals of society. Freud believed that the Superego allows the mind to control the impulses of the Id that are viewed as immoral. The Superego can be considered the conscience of the mind because it can distinguish right from wrong. Without the Superego, Freud believed people would act out with aggression and other immoral behaviors because the mind would have no way of understanding the difference between right and wrong. Freud separates the Superego into two separate categories: the ideal self and the conscience. The conscience contains ideals and morals that exist within a society that prevent people from acting out based on their internal desires. The ideal self contains images of how people ought to behave according to society's ideals.

== The unconscious ==
Freud believed that the answers to what controlled daily actions resided in the unconscious mind, despite alternative views that all our behaviors were conscious. He felt that religion is an illusion based on human values that are created by the mind to overcome inner psychological conflict. He believed that notions of the unconsciousness and gaps in the consciousness can be explained by acts of which the consciousness affords no evidence. The unconscious mind positions itself in every aspect of life, whether one is dormant or awake. Though one may be unaware of the impact of the unconscious mind, it influences the actions we engage in. Human behavior may be understood by searching for an analysis of mental processes. This explanation gives significance to verbal slips and dreams. They are caused by hidden reasons in the mind displayed in concealed forms. Verbal slips of the unconscious mind are referred to as a Freudian slip. This is a term to explain a spoken mistake derived from the unconscious mind. Traumatizing information on thoughts and beliefs is blocked from the conscious mind. Slips expose our true thoughts stored in the unconscious.

Sexual instincts or drives have deeply hidden roots in the unconscious mind. Instincts act by giving vitality and enthusiasm to the mind through meaning and purpose. The range of instincts is in great numbers. Freud expressed them in two categories. One is Eros, the self-preserving life instinct containing all erotic pleasures. While Eros is used for basic survival, the living instinct alone cannot explain all behavior, according to Freud. In contrast, Thanatos is the death instinct. It is full of self-destruction of sexual energy and our unconscious desire to die. The main part of human behavior and actions is tied back to sexual drives. Since birth, the existence of sexual drives can be recognized as one of the most important incentives of life.

== Psychosexual stages ==
Freud's theory of psychosexual development is represented by five stages. According to Freud, each stage occurs within a specific time frame of one's life. If one becomes fixated in any of the five stages, he or she will develop personality traits that coincide with the specific stage and its focus.

- Oral Stage – The first stage is the oral stage. An infant is in this stage from birth to eighteen months of age. The main focus in the oral stage is pleasure-seeking through the infant's mouth. During this stage, the need for tasting and sucking becomes prominent in producing pleasure. Oral stimulation is crucial during this stage; if the infant's needs are not met during this time frame he or she will be fixated in the oral stage. Fixation in this stage can lead to adult habits such as thumb-sucking, smoking, over-eating, and nail-biting. Personality traits can also develop during adulthood that is linked to oral fixation; these traits can include optimism and independence or pessimism and hostility.
- Anal Stage – The second stage is the anal stage which lasts from eighteen months to three years of age. During this stage, the infant's pleasure-seeking centers are located in the bowels and bladder. Parents stress toilet training and bowel control during this time period. Fixation in the anal stage can lead to anal-retention or anal-expulsion. Anal retentive characteristics include being overly neat, precise, and orderly while being anal expulsive involves being disorganized, messy, and destructive.
- Phallic Stage – The third stage is the phallic stage. It begins at the age of three and continues until the age of six. Now, sensitivity becomes concentrated in the genitals and masturbation (in both sexes) becomes a new source of pleasure. The child becomes aware of anatomical sex differences, which sets in motion the conflict of jealousy and fear which Freud called the Oedipus complex (in boys). Later, the Freud scholars added the Electra complex (in girls).
- Latency Stage – The fourth stage is the latency stage which begins at the age of six and continues until the age of eleven. During this stage, there is no pleasure-seeking region of the body; instead, all sexual feelings are repressed. Thus, children are able to develop social skills and find comfort through peer and family interaction.
- Genital Stage – The final stage of psychosexual development is the genital stage. This stage starts from eleven onwards, lasts through puberty, and ends when one reaches adulthood at the age of eighteen. The onset of puberty reflects a strong interest from one person to another of the opposite sex. If one does not experience fixation in any of the psychosexual stages, once he or she has reached the genital stage, he or she will grow into a well-balanced human being.

== Anxiety and defense mechanisms ==
Freud proposed a set of defense mechanisms in one's body. This set of defense mechanisms occurs so that one can hold a favorable or preferred view of oneself. For example, in a particular situation when an event occurs that violates one's preferred view of oneself, Freud stated that it is necessary for the self to have some mechanism to defend itself against this unfavorable event; this is known as a defense mechanism. Freud's work on defense mechanisms focused on how the ego defends itself against internal events or impulses, which are regarded as unacceptable to one's ego. These defense mechanisms are used to handle the conflict between the id, the ego, and the superego.

Freud noted that a major drive for people is the reduction of tension and the major cause of tension is anxiety. He identified three types of anxiety; reality anxiety, neurotic anxiety, and moral anxiety. Reality anxiety is the most basic form of anxiety and is based on the ego. It is typically based on the fear of real and possible events, for example, being bitten by a dog or falling off a roof. Neurotic anxiety comes from an unconscious fear that the basic impulses of the id will take control of the person, leading to eventual punishment for expressing the id's desires. Moral anxiety comes from the superego. It appears in the form of a fear of violating values or moral codes and appears as feelings like guilt or shame.

When anxiety occurs, the mind's first response is to seek rational ways of escaping the situation by increasing problem-solving efforts and a range of defense mechanisms may be triggered. These are ways that the ego develops to help deal with the id and the superego. Defense mechanisms often appear unconsciously and tend to distort or falsify reality. When the distortion of reality occurs, there is a change in perception which allows for a lessening in anxiety, resulting in a reduction of the tension one experiences. Sigmund Freud noted a number of ego defenses throughout his work; his daughter, Anna Freud, developed and elaborated on them.

The defense mechanisms are as follows: 1) Denial is believing that what is true is actually false 2) Displacement is taking out impulses on a less threatening target 3) Intellectualization is avoiding unacceptable emotions by focusing on the intellectual aspects 4) Projection is attributing uncomfortable feelings to others 5) Rationalization is creating false but believable justifications 6) Reaction Formation is taking the opposite belief because the true belief causes anxiety 7) Regression is going back to a previous stage of development 8) Repression is pushing uncomfortable thoughts out of conscious awareness 9) Suppression is consciously forcing unwanted thoughts out of our awareness 10) Sublimation is redirecting ‘wrong’ urges into socially acceptable actions. These defenses are not under our conscious control and our unconscious will use one or more to protect ourselves from stressful situations. They are natural and normal and without these, neurosis develops, such as anxiety states, phobias, obsessions, or hysteria.

== Totem and Taboo ==
Totem and Taboo

Freud desired to understand religion and spirituality and dealt with the nature of religious beliefs in many of his books and essays. He regarded God as an illusion, based on the infantile need for a powerful father figure. Freud believed that religion was an expression of underlying psychological neuroses and distress. In his book Totem and Taboo (1913), he suggested that religion is an attempt to control the Oedipal complex.

Totem and Taboo attempts to reconstruct the birth and the process of development of religion as a social institution. Freud tried to demonstrate how psychoanalysis is important in the understanding of the growth of civilization. He purports to show how the Oedipus complex and the incest taboo came into being and why they are present in all human societies. The incest taboo rises because of a desire for incest. The purpose of the totemic animal is not for group unity, but to reinforce the incest taboo. The totemic animal is not a symbol of God but a symbol of the father and it is an important part of religious development. Totemism originates from the memory of an event in pre-history where the male group members eat the father figure due to a desire for the females. The guilt they feel for their actions and for the loss of a father figure leads them to prohibit incest in a new way. Totemism is a means of preventing incest and as a ritual reminder of the murder of the father. This shows that sexual desire, since there are many social prohibitions on sexual relations, is channeled through certain ritual actions and all societies adapt these rituals so that sexuality develops in approved ways. This reveals unconscious desires and their repression. Freud believes that civilization makes people unhappy because it contradicts the desire for progress, freedom, happiness, and wealth. Civilization requires the repression of drives and instincts such as sexual, aggression, and the death instinct in order that civilization can work.

According to Freud, religion originated in prehistoric collective experiences that became repressed and ritualized as totems and taboos. He stated that most, if not all religions, can be traced back to early human sacrifice. In Christianity, Christ on the cross is a symbolic representation of killing the father. Eating the father figure is shown with the body of Christ, also known as Communion. In this work, Freud attributed the origin of religion to emotions such as hatred, fear, and jealousy. These emotions are directed towards the father figure in the clan from the sons who are denied sexual desires towards the females. Freud attributed totem religions to be a result of extreme emotion, rash action, and the result of guilt.

== The Psychopathology of Everyday Life ==
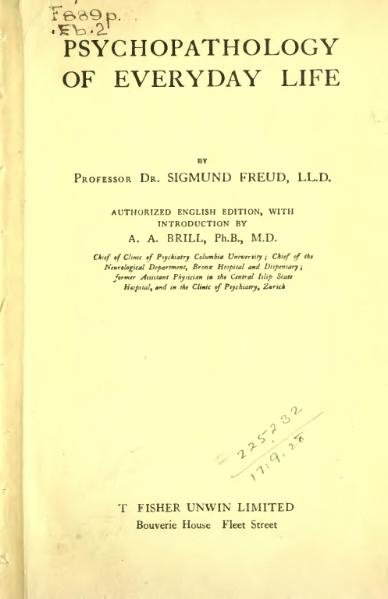
The Psychopathology of Everyday Life

The Psychopathology of Everyday Life is one of the most important books in psychology. It was written by Freud in 1901, and it laid the basis for the theory of psychoanalysis. The book contains twelve chapters on forgetting things such as names, childhood memories, mistakes, clumsiness, slips of the tongue, and determinism of the unconscious. Freud believed that there were reasons that people forget things like words, names, and memories. He also believed that mistakes in speech, now referred to as a Freudian Slip, were not accidents but instead the "dynamic unconscious" revealing something meaningful.

Freud suggested that our everyday psychopathology is a minor disturbance of mental life which may quickly pass away. Freud believed all of these acts to have an important significance; the most trivial slips of the tongue or pen may reveal people's secret feelings and fantasies. Pathology is brought into everyday life which Freud pointed out through dreams, forgetfulness, and parapraxes. He used these things to make his case for the existence of an unconscious that refuses to be explained or contained by consciousness. Freud explained how the forgetting of multiple events in our everyday life can be a consequence of repression, suppression, denial, displacement, and identification. Defense mechanisms occur to protect one's ego so in The Psychopathology of Everyday Life, Freud stated, "painful memories merge into motivated forgetting which special ease". (p. 154)

== Three Essays on the Theory of Sexuality ==
Three Essays on the Theory of Sexuality, sometimes titled Three Contributions to the Theory of Sex, which Freud wrote in 1905, explores his theory of sexuality and its presence throughout childhood. It describes three main topics in reference to sexuality: sexual perversions, childhood sexuality, and puberty. The first essay, "The Sexual Aberrations," focuses on the distinction between a sexual object and a sexual aim. A sexual object is an object that one desires, whereas a sexual aim is the act that one desires to perform with the object. Freud's second essay, "Infantile Sexuality," claims that children have sexual urges. The psychosexual stages are the steps a child takes in order to continue having sexual urges when adulthood is reached. The third essay, "The Transformation of Puberty," examines how children express their sexuality throughout puberty and how sexual identity is formed at this time. Freud attempted to link unconscious sexual desires to conscious actions in each of his essays.

== The Interpretation of Dreams ==
The Interpretation of Dreams is one of Sigmund Freud's best-known published works. It set the stage for his psychoanalytic work and Freud's approach to the unconscious with regard to the interpretation of dreams. During therapy sessions with patients, Freud would ask his patients to discuss what was on their minds. Frequently, the responses were directly related to a dream. As a result, Freud began to analyze dreams, believing that it gave him access to one's deepest thoughts. In addition, he was able to find links between one's current hysterical behaviors and past traumatic experiences. From these experiences, he began to write a book that was designed to help others to understand dream interpretation. In the book, he discussed his theory of the unconscious.

Freud believed that dreams were messages from the unconscious masked as wishes controlled by internal stimuli. The unconscious mind plays the most imperative role in dream interpretation. In order to remain in a state of sleep, the unconscious mind has to suppress negative thoughts and represent them in any edited form. Therefore, when one dreams, the unconscious makes an effort to deal with conflict. It would enable one to begin to act on them.

There are four steps required to convert dreams from latent or unconscious thoughts to the manifest content. They are condensation, displacement, symbolism, and secondary revision. Ideas first go through a process of condensation that takes thoughts and turns them into a single image. Then, the true emotional meaning of the dream loses its significance in an element of displacement. This is followed by symbolism representing our latent thoughts in visual form. A special focus on symbolism was emphasized in the interpretation of dreams. Our dreams are highly symbolic with an underlying principal meaning. Many of the symbolic stages focus on sexual connotations. For example, a tree branch could represent a penis. Freud believed all human behavior originated from our sexual drives and desires. In the last stage of converting dreams to manifest content, dreams are made sensible. The final product of manifest content is what we remember when we wake up.

== Sources ==
- Barg, J. A.; Morsella, E. (2008). "The Unconscious Mind". Perspect Psychol Sci. 3 (1): 73–79. doi:10.1111/j.1745-6916.2008.00064.x. PMC 2440575. PMID 18584056.
- Cherry, K. (n.d.). Dream Interpretation: What Do Dreams Mean? About.com Psychology. Retrieved from http://psychology.about.com/od/statesofconsciousness/p/dream-interpret.htm Archived 2016-04-05 at the Wayback Machine
- Cherry, K. (n.d.). Life and Death Instincts. About.com Psychology. Retrieved from http://psychology.about.com/od/sigmundfreud/a/instincts.htm Archived 2016-01-19 at the Wayback Machine
- Cherry, K. (n.d.). What Is a Freudian Slip? About.com Psychology. Retrieved from http://psychology.about.com/od/sigmundfreud/f/freudian-slip.htm Archived 2016-04-16 at the Wayback Machine
- Defense Mechanisms (2013, November 28). Defense Mechanisms. Retrieved from http://changingminds.org/explanations/behaviors/coping/defense_mechanisms.htm
- "Freud's book, "The Interpretation of Dreams" released" (1998). PBS. Retrieved from https://www.pbs.org/wgbh/aso/databank/entries/dh00fr.html
- The Freud Museum (n.d.). Freud Museum ~ Education. Retrieved from http://www.freud.org.uk/education/topic/10573/freud-and-religion/
- Green, C. (n.d.). Classics in the History of Psychology—Freud (1901) Index. Classics in the History of Psychology—Freud (1901) Index. Retrieved November 28, 2013, from http://psychclassics.yorku.ca/Freud/Psycho/
- Lapsley, Daniel. "The Id, Ego and Superego." Encyclopedia of Human Behavior, 2nd Ed, 2012. Web. 03 Dec. 2013.
- McLeod, S. (n.d.). Defense Mechanisms. - Simply Psychology. Retrieved December 3, 2013, from http://www.simplypsychology.org/defense-mechanisms.html
- McLeod, S. (n.d.). Id, Ego, and Superego. Retrieved from http://www.simplypsychology.org/psyche.html
- McLeod, S. A. (2008). Psychosexual Stages - Simply Psychology. Retrieved from http://www.simplypsychology.org/psychosexual.html
- McLeod, S. (2009). Unconscious Mind. - Simply Psychology. Retrieved from http://www.simplypsychology.org/unconscious-mind.html
- Roberts, A. (n.d.). Extracts from Sigmund Freud's Totem and Taboo (1913). Extracts from Sigmund Freud's Totem and Taboo (1913). Retrieved November 28, 2013, from http://studymore.org.uk/xfre1913.htm
- Sammons, A. (n.d.). Psychodynamic approach: The basics. Psychodynamic Approach: The Basics. Retrieved November 2013
- Solms, Mark. (2012). The "Id" Knows More than the "Ego" Admits: Neuropsychoanalytic and Primal Consciousness Perspectives on the Interface Between Affective and Cognitive Neuroscience. Brain Sciences, 2(2), 147–175. Retrieved from http://www.mdpi.com/2076-3425/2/2/147
- Strachey, J. (Trans.) (1922). Group Psychology and the Analysis of the Ego. The International Psycho-analytical Library, 6. Retrieved December 2013.
- Strong Reading: Sigmund Freud—"Totem & Taboo" (August 14, 2011)
- The Freud Museum (n.d.). Freud Museum ~ Education. Retrieved from http://www.freud.org.uk/education/topic/10573/freud-and-religion/
- The life of Sigmund Freud. (2004). PBS. Retrieved from https://www.pbs.org/wgbh/questionofgod/twolives/freudbio.html
- Understanding the Id, Ego, and Superego in Psychology (n.d.). - For Dummies. Retrieved from http://www.dummies.com/how-to/content/understanding-the-id-ego-and-superego-in-psycholog.html
