= Concert (Braque) =

1937 painting by Georges Braque

- Artist: Georges Braque
- Year: 1937
- Medium: Oil on canvas
- Dimensions: 71.12 cm × 90.17 cm (28.00 in × 35.50 in)
- Location: Los Angeles County Museum of Art, Los Angeles

Concert is an oil-on-canvas still-life painting by the French painter Georges Braque, painted in 1937. It is held at the Los Angeles County Museum of Art. In comparison to earlier paintings by Braque, especially those of Analytical Cubism, it contains Surrealist inspired aspects, such as a more colorful palette, and a more representational rendering of the objects. Concert incorporates colors such as green and blue, as opposed to containing strictly neutral tones. However, Concert still incorporates many Cubist elements, such as the play on perspectives, fragmentation, and the inclusion of letters.

Braque had an early fascination with still-life subjects for their tactile space, and for the possibilities of contradictory perspectives. However, with the end of Cubism in 1919, and the birth of Dada and Surrealism in the 1920s, contemporary artists became interested in dreams, automatism, and the Freudian Theory of the id, and paintings subsequently included dream or fantasy inspired subject matter. Nonetheless, in the 1930s, Braque's early interest in still-life re-emerged, and he continued to use still-life as the subject of his paintings.
