= MiFinder =

Mifinder
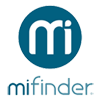
- Website type: Social Discovery Application
- Available in: English
- Website: mifinder.co
- Registration: No
- Current status: Active

Mifinder was an iPhone app released in 2012. It was aimed at LGBT groups who share a common life experience, and used a mobile phone's Global Positioning System to locate users.

== History ==
Mifinder was launched in November 2012 by a UK based company which created the app after working with diverse communities for over a decade and found that there was no community-oriented application that allowed people from diverse ethnic, religious, sexual and disability backgrounds to find each other and actively make friends, and gain social support with other communities around them based on their location. Mifinder later expanded to include "Life Experiences" to help people such as wheelchair users to connect with one another. Mifinder evolved to specifically focus on life experiences as it is driven by the principle that people who have gone through similar experiences can have greater mutual understanding, and therefore can offer more support to one another.

== Life Experiences ==
UK charity Scope's tech blog described Mifinder's product evolution, explaining that the app is now uniquely aimed at groups in society with often higher rates of isolation, as people connect with each other based on a shared ‘life experience’. These experiences include visual, hearing or other specific impairments, or an experience such as being new to an area or learning a language. Momentum Magazine wrote that Mifinder now also includes "Life Experiences" filters, such as wheelchair users and coping with parenting. Mifinder is reported to be driven by the principle that people who have gone through similar experiences can have greater mutual understanding, and therefore can offer support to one another, for example to seek advice about accessible venues, local support and information about the area. Mifinder was keen to emphasise that the focus is on community and friendships.

== Product ==
According to Tourism For All UK, in order to use the application the user selects the communities he/she belong to, uploads their photo and profile text, and their reason for using the application. They select the communities to engage with, in any combination. A thumbnail screen then appears, showing the profiles of the closest 120 users who fit the exact chosen criteria, ordered on the screen according to how far they are from the user in metres and miles at that moment. The user is then able to instant message, share photos and their exact location with car and walking directions with any user they choose. This GPS works globally.

Mifinder caters to a variety of life experience, ethnic, religious, sexual and disability communities. In addition to Life Experiences, these include the globally dispersed such as Baháʼí, Ismaili, Jewish, Traveler, those small in number such as Australian Aborigine, Native American etc.

The app's filters mean that a user who identifies with several groups, such as a black gay Christian or a Jewish, disabled male etc. can see who around them shares the same characteristics and connect with them via GPS. People who are not from minority communities can use the app to meet a diverse range of people around them. Users can also select “support” if they are looking for social support from other users for example if they are disabled, new to an area or may not speak the local language. Mifinder also allows community groups and organizations to have a ‘real time’ presence on the app.

The filters are said to encourage people to engage with other communities who they may not have otherwise socialized with. This application was designed to strengthen community ties and reduce isolation on an individual level and act as a tool for greater cohesion. Mifinder also allows community groups and organizations to have a ‘real time’ presence on the app.

== Reception ==
Momentum Magazine, an online publication for the UK disability sports community, said "Mifinder have made it easier for people with a variety of life experiences, including wheelchair users, to meet each other in realtime." It added that the app "provides countless opportunities for not only organising sports events and finding new members for teams, but also for simply making meaningful connections and sharing local information."

Carrie-Ann Lightley, head of Tourism for All's Information service, an independent charity supporting tourism and leisure opportunities for disabled people stated “I would highly recommend Mifinder® to people with disabilities as it could have a real and invaluable benefit to their lives and their ability to access support, networking and dating. It is an excellent idea and a unique concept for those people who may feel lonely and isolated, so overall a great product”

The application is listed as a founding partner of Go-On-Gold, which is a national campaign to raise awareness about the barriers faced by disabled people in accessing computers and the Internet, and to help remove those barriers.

== Security ==
According to the developers, security is paramount including options to instantly block and report users, and to turn distance off. The exact location is never shared unless given and all profile photos are checked by real people and there are profanity filters. According to the developers these controls make it as "secure as it can possibly be".
