= Anangeon =

Method of argument

Anangeon (Ancient Greek: ἀναγκαῖον, "necessary"), also known as dicaeologia (δικαιολογία, "a plea in defense"), is a specious method of argument, in which the basis lies in inevitability or necessity. For example, a murderer could argue that his actions were inevitable or necessary because the opposite provoked so he had to retaliate ignoring the fact there were alternative actions to handle the situation. It is used to limit or contradict fault in a matter.

Anangeon can be seen as a part of logos and is a type of non sequitur.

== See also ==
- Ethos
- Pathos
- Rationalization (making excuses)
