= James DiCenso =

Canadian philosopher

- Born: 1957 (age 68–69)
- Awards: Choice Outstanding Academic Title

Education
- Education: Syracuse University (PhD), Carleton University (MA), Concordia University (BA)
- Thesis: Hermeneutics and the Disclosure of Truth: A Study in the Work of Heidegger, Gadamer, and Ricoeur (1987)

Philosophical work
- Era: 21st-century philosophy
- Region: Western philosophy
- Institutions: University of Toronto

James J. DiCenso (born 1957) is a Canadian philosopher and Professor at the University of Toronto. He is known for his works on the philosophy of religion. His book Kant, Religion, and Politics was accredited as one of the 2012 Choice Review Online's Outstanding Academic Titles.

== Books ==
- Hermeneutics and the Disclosure of Truth: A Study in the Work of Heidegger, Gadamer, and Ricoeur. Charlottesville: University of Virginia Press, 1990
- The Other Freud: Religion, Culture and Psychoanalysis. London: Routledge, 1999
- Kant, Religion, and Politics. Cambridge: Cambridge University Press, 2011
- Kant’s Religion within the Boundaries of Mere Reason: a Commentary. Cambridge: Cambridge University Press, 2012
