= Homeostatic capacity =

Capability of systems to maintain homeostasis

Homeostatic capacity refers to the capability of systems to self-stabilize in response to external forces or stressors, or more simply the capability of systems to maintain homeostasis. For living organisms, it is life's foundational trait, consisting of a hierarchy and network of traits endowed by nature and shaped by natural selection. Homeostatic capacity comprises a multidimensional network of traits and operates at all scales of biology systems levels including molecular, cellular, physiological, and organismal.

== Human homeostatic capacity ==
In the context of human beings, homeostatic capacity refers to the inherent ability of the body to self-stabilize in response to external and internal stimuli. Homeostatic capacity of the human body erodes with age.

== Homeostatic capacity and aging ==
A hypothesis proffered by the proponents of the Palo Alto Longevity Prize is that the array of ailments associated with aging may be epiphenomena of eroding homeostatic capacity and the process of aging may be halted or reversed by restoring homeostatic capacity to that of a healthy young adult.

== See also ==
- Senescence
