= Isolation (psychology) =

Defence mechanism

Isolation (German: Isolierung) is a defence mechanism in psychoanalytic theory, first proposed by Sigmund Freud. While related to repression, the concept distinguishes itself in several ways. It is characterized as a mental process involving the creation of a gap between an unpleasant or threatening cognition and other thoughts and feelings. By minimizing associative connections with other thoughts, the threatening cognition is remembered less often and is less likely to affect self-esteem or self concept. Freud illustrated the concept with the example of a person beginning a train of thought and then pausing for a moment before continuing to a different subject. His theory stated that by inserting an interval, the person was "letting it be understood symbolically that he will not allow his thoughts about that impression or activity to come into associative contact with other thoughts." As a defense against harmful thoughts, isolation prevents the self from allowing these cognitions to become recurrent and possibly damaging to the self-concept.

== Evidence ==
A wide range of studies support the conclusion that people defend themselves against threats by mentally isolating them. Repressors have been shown to process information in a rushed, shallow, or minimal fashion. When presented with some negative information, they will often generate spontaneous happy thoughts or feelings, minimizing its impact. Depressed people process information much more thoroughly, whether it is good or bad. This high level of processing develops strong associative links with similar information. When a depressed person tries to avoid damaging cognition, they often think of some other negatively affecting thought. Evidence from human and animal studies shows that isolation prompts sensitivity to social threats and motivates the renewal of social connections.

One study showed that people would remain satisfied with their performance in the face of negative feedback as long as they could keep the feedback isolated from performance standards. The researchers would present the standards either before the performance, or after the performance but before the feedback, or after both the performance and the feedback. The people who received the standards early recalled them as well as the others, but simply ignored them. They managed to isolate their feedback from the standards, thereby minimizing the threat to their self-esteem. Those who received the standards later were less satisfied with their performance, unable to avoid their lack of success as compared to the norm. This form of isolation has been referred to as trivializing.

Another noteworthy type of isolation is referred to as "temporal bracketing," in which some perceived failure or shortcoming is buried away in one's past, effectively removing its impact on the current self. This type of separation from the past can be seen in religious conversion or "born again" experiences, in certain drug addiction recovery programs, and in the throwing away of delinquent files in the legal system. These socially accepted practices effectively make isolation socially permissible, at least in certain instances; and those behaviors seem to relieve some of the stress from past events. People with low self-esteem often use temporal bracketing when describing past failures. By isolating themselves from whatever misdeed they are bringing to cognition, they contend that it has nothing to do with their current state or relationships with people.

=== Effect ===
Habitual repressors have been shown to have fewer unhappy memories than other people, but the difference rests in the secondary associations. Research on repressors concluded that they had equally strong negative reactions to bad memories; however, those memories did not evoke other negative feelings as much as they did for non-repressors. The phrase "architecture of less complex emotions" was created to describe this phenomenon. Repressors have bad memories just like anyone else, but they are less troubled by them because they are relatively isolated in memory. Most current researchers have agreed that isolation is one of the most effective and important mechanisms of defense from harmful cognitions. It is a coping mechanism that does not require delusions of reality, which makes it more plausible than some alternatives (denial, sublimation, projection, etc.). Further research will be needed for accounts of isolation to be considered fully concrete.
