= Defence mechanism =

Unconscious psychological mechanism

In psychoanalytic theory, defence mechanisms are unconscious psychological processes that protect the self from anxiety-producing thoughts and feelings related to internal conflicts and external stressors. Defences are automatically used to protect ourselves from threats and affects to maintain psychological balance and homeostasis. Defences are automatic responses to external stressors or internal conflicts.

Healthy people have a fully developed sense of "object constancy", knowing that bad and good can exist at the same time in the same person. A defence mechanism can become pathological when its persistent use leads to maladaptive behaviour such that the physical or mental health of the individual is adversely affected. Among the purposes of defence mechanisms is to protect the mind/self/ego from anxiety or to provide a refuge from a situation with which one cannot cope at that moment.

== Examples ==
Examples of defence mechanisms include: repression, the exclusion of unacceptable desires and ideas from consciousness; identification, the incorporation of some aspects of an object into oneself; rationalization, the justification of one's behaviour by using apparently logical reasons that are acceptable to the ego, thereby further suppressing awareness of the unconscious motivations; and sublimation, the process of channeling libido into "socially useful" disciplines, such as artistic, cultural, and intellectual pursuits, which indirectly provide gratification for the original drives.

== History ==
In the first definitive book on defence mechanisms, The Ego and the Mechanisms of Defence (1936), Anna Freud enumerated the ten defence mechanisms that appear in the works of her father, Sigmund Freud: repression, regression, reaction formation, isolation, undoing, projection, introjection, turning against one's own person, reversal into the opposite, and sublimation or displacement.

Sigmund Freud posited that defence mechanisms work by distorting id impulses into acceptable forms, or by unconscious or conscious blockage of these impulses. Anna Freud considered defence mechanisms as intellectual and motor automatisms of various degrees of complexity, that arose in the process of involuntary and voluntary learning.

Anna Freud introduced the concept of signal anxiety; she stated that it was "not directly a conflicted instinctual tension but a signal occurring in the ego of an anticipated instinctual tension". The signalling function of anxiety was thus seen as crucial, and biologically adapted to warn the organism of danger or a threat to its equilibrium. The anxiety is felt as an increase in bodily or mental tension, and the signal that the organism receives in this way allows for the possibility of taking defensive action regarding the perceived danger.

Both Freuds studied defence mechanisms, but Anna spent more of her time and research on five main mechanisms: repression, regression, projection, reaction formation, and sublimation. All defence mechanisms are responses to anxiety and how the consciousness and unconscious manage the stress of a social situation.

- Repression: the exclusion of unacceptable desires and ideas from consciousness, though in certain circumstances they may resurface in a disguised or distorted form
- Regression: falling back into an early state of mental/physical development seen as "less demanding and safer"
- Projection: possessing a feeling that is deemed as socially unacceptable and instead of facing it, that feeling or "unconscious urge" is seen in the actions of other people
- Reaction formation: acting the opposite way that the unconscious instructs a person to behave, "often exaggerated and obsessive". For example, if a wife is infatuated with a man who is not her husband, reaction formation may cause her to – rather than cheat – become obsessed with showing her husband signs of love and affection.
- Sublimation: seen as the most acceptable of the mechanisms, an expression of anxiety in socially acceptable ways

Robert Plutchik's (1979) theory views defences as derivatives of basic emotions, which in turn relate to particular diagnostic structures. According to his theory, reaction formation relates to joy (and manic features), denial relates to acceptance (and histrionic features), repression to fear (and passivity), regression to surprise (and borderline traits), compensation to sadness (and depression), projection to disgust (and paranoia), displacement to anger (and hostility) and intellectualization to anticipation (and obsessionality).

Different theorists have different categorizations and conceptualizations of defence mechanisms. Large reviews of theories of defence mechanisms are available from Paulhus, Fridhandler and Hayes (1997) and Cramer (1991). The Journal of Personality published a special issue on defence mechanisms (1998).

=== DSM-IV-TR classification ===
The Diagnostic and Statistical Manual of Mental Disorders (DSM-IV) published by the American Psychiatric Association (1994) includes a tentative diagnostic axis for defence mechanisms. This classification is largely based on Vaillant's hierarchical view of defences, but has some modifications. Examples include: denial, fantasy, rationalization, regression, isolation, projection, and displacement. However, additional defence mechanisms are still proposed and investigated by different authors. For instance, in 2023, time distortion was proposed in a publication as a newly identified ego defence.

- High adaptive level
  - Anticipation
  - Affiliation
  - Altruism
  - Humor
  - Self-Assertion
  - Self-Observation
  - Sublimation
  - Suppression
- Mental inhibitions (compromise formation) level
  - Displacement
  - Dissociation
  - Intellectualization
  - Isolation of Affect
  - Reaction Formation
  - Repression
  - Undoing
- Minor image-distorting level
  - Devaluation
  - Idealization
  - Omnipotence
- Disavowal level
  - Denial
  - Projection
  - Rationalization
- Major image-distorting level
  - Autistic fantasy
  - Projective identification
  - Splitting of self-image or image of others
- Action level
  - Acting Out
  - Apathetic withdrawal
  - Help-rejecting complaining
  - Passive aggression
- Level of defensive dysregulation
  - Delusional projection
  - Psychotic denial
  - Psychotic distortion

== PDM-2 classification ==
- Healthy level of organization
  - Flexibility (personality)
- Neurotic level of organization
  - Rigidity (psychology)
  - Inner conflict
- Borderline level of organization
  - defences ("primitive", "immature", or "costly")
    - Splitting
      - Identity diffusion
    - Projective identification
    - Denial
    - Withdrawal
    - Omnipotent control
    - Acting out
    - Somatization
    - Dissociation
    - Primitive idealization
    - Primitive devaluation
  - Emotional dysregulation
  - Relational problems
  - Self-destructive behavior
  - Impulsivity
- Psychotic level of organization
  - defences to terrifying anxieties
    - Psychotic denial
    - Autistic withdrawal
    - Distortion
    - Delusional projection
    - Fragmentation
    - Concretization
  - Thought disorder
  - Inappropriateness
  - Annihilation anxiety
  - Certainty
  - Identity diffusion
  - Severe deficits in reality testing
  - Delusions

== Transference-focused psychotherapy classification ==
Otto F. Kernberg developed a theory of borderline personality organization of which one consequence may be borderline personality disorder. His theory is based on ego psychological object relations theory. Borderline personality organization develops when the child cannot integrate helpful and harmful mental objects together. Kernberg views the use of primitive defence mechanisms as central to this personality organization. Primitive psychological defences are projection, denial, dissociation or splitting and they are called borderline defence mechanisms. Also, devaluation and projective identification are seen as borderline defences.

- Mature defences
  - Suppression
  - Anticipation
  - Altruism
  - Humor
  - Sublimation
- Repression-based defences
  - Repression
  - Isolation of affect
  - Intellectualization
  - Reaction formation
  - Neurotic projection
  - Displacement
- Splitting-based defences
  - Splitting
  - Projective identification
  - Lower-level idealization
  - Devaluation
  - Omnipotent control
  - Lower-level denial

== Gabbard's classification ==
- Most adaptive
  - Humor
  - Altruism
  - Sublimation
  - Suppression
- More adaptive
  - Isolation of affect
  - Intellectualization
  - Rationalization
  - Displacement
  - Somatization
  - Undoing
  - Reaction formation
  - Identification
  - Excessive emotionality
  - Externalization
  - Sexualization
  - Repression
  - Turning against the self
- Less adaptive
  - Splitting
  - Projection
  - Pathological idealization and devaluation
  - Projective identification
  - Denial
  - Dissociation
  - Acting out
  - Regression

== Vaillant's categorization ==
Psychiatrist George Eman Vaillant introduced a four-level classification of defence mechanisms. Much of this work is derived from his observations while overseeing the Grant Study, a longitudinal investigation that began in 1937 and continues to the present. In monitoring a cohort of Harvard men from their freshman year through late adulthood, Vaillant sought to determine which psychological mechanisms influenced long-term adaptation and life outcomes. The hierarchy of defences was found to correlate with overall psychological maturity and the capacity to adapt effectively to life’s challenges. The overarching aim of the study was to define the characteristics of mental health rather than psychopathology.

- Level I – pathological defences (psychotic denial, delusional projection)
- Level II – immature defences (fantasy, projection, passive aggression, acting out)
- Level III – neurotic defences (intellectualization, reaction formation, dissociation, displacement, repression)
- Level IV – mature defences (humour, sublimation, suppression, altruism, anticipation)

=== Level 1: pathological ===
When predominant, the mechanisms on this level are almost always severely pathological. These defences permit the individual to radically reshape external reality in order to avoid coping with it. Pathological users of these mechanisms may appear irrational or insane to others. These are the “pathological” defences, commonly observed in overt psychosis, although they also appear in dreams and in normal childhood development.

They include:

- Delusional projection: Delusions about external reality, usually of a persecutory nature.
- Denial: Refusal to accept external reality because it is too threatening; resolving emotional conflict and reducing anxiety by rejecting or failing to acknowledge unpleasant aspects of reality.
- Distortion: A gross reshaping of external reality to meet internal needs.

=== Level 2: immature ===
These mechanisms are often present in adults. They lessen distress and anxiety produced by threatening people or by an uncomfortable reality. Excessive use of such defences is seen as socially undesirable, in that they are immature, difficult to deal with, and seriously out of touch with reality. These defences are often seen in major depression and personality disorders.

They include:

- Acting out: Direct expression of an unconscious wish or impulse in action, without conscious awareness of the emotion that drives the expressive behavior.
- Hypochondriasis: An excessive preoccupation or worry about having a serious illness.
- Passive-aggressive behavior: Indirect expression of hostility.
- Projection: A primitive form of paranoia. Projection reduces anxiety by allowing the expression of undesirable impulses or desires without conscious awareness; attributing one's own unacceptable thoughts and emotions to another.
- Schizoid fantasy: Tendency to retreat into fantasy in order to resolve inner and outer conflicts.
- Splitting.

=== Level 3: neurotic ===
These mechanisms are considered neurotic, but fairly common in adults. Such defences have short-term advantages in coping but can cause long-term problems in relationships, work, and enjoyment of life when used as one's primary coping style.

They include:

- Displacement: Shifting sexual or aggressive impulses to a more acceptable or less threatening target.
- Dissociation: Temporary drastic modification of one's personal identity or character to avoid emotional distress.
- Intellectualization: Excessively analytical or abstract thought patterns used to block out conflicting or disturbing feelings.
- Isolation of affect: Detachment of emotion from an idea, making it "flat." Frequently observed in obsessive–compulsive disorder and in non-disordered people following traumatic events.
- Reaction formation: Converting unconscious wishes or impulses perceived as dangerous or unacceptable into their opposites.
- Repression: Attempting to repel desires toward pleasurable instincts by moving them into the unconscious.

=== Level 4: mature ===
These mechanisms are commonly found among emotionally healthy adults and are considered mature, even though many originate in earlier developmental stages. They are conscious processes adapted over time to optimise success in society and relationships. Their use enhances pleasure and feelings of control and helps integrate conflicting emotions and thoughts.

Mature defences include:

- Altruism: Constructive service to others that brings pleasure and personal satisfaction.
- Anticipation: Realistic planning for future discomfort.
- Humour: Expression of ideas and feelings that gives pleasure to others while retaining some of their innate distress.
- Sublimation: Transformation of unhelpful emotions or instincts into healthy actions; for example, channeling aggression into a contact sport.
- Suppression: Conscious decision to delay attention to a thought, emotion, or need in order to cope with present reality.

== Perry's defence mechanism rating scale (DMRS) ==
The defence Mechanism Rating Scale (DMRS) includes thirty processes of defence that are divided into 7 categories. Starting from the highest level of adaptiveness these levels include: high-adaptive, obsessional, neurotic, minor image-distorting, disavowal, major image-distorting, and action. The scale was originally created by J. Christopher Perry for the purpose of being able to provide patients with a "defence diagnosis." Additions have been made by Mariagrazia Di Giuseppe and colleagues to enlarge the application of the DMRS, creating the DMRS self report and DMRS-Q sort.

Psychologist J. Perry follows a system that ranks defence mechanisms into seven levels, ranging from a high-adaptive defence level to a psychotic defence level. Assessments carried out when analyzing patients such as the Defence Mechanism Rating Scale (DMRS) and Vaillant's hierarchy of defence mechanisms have been used and modified for over 40 years to provide numerical data on the state of a person's defensive functioning.

=== Level 0: psychotic defences ===
Psychotic defence mechanisms (P-DMRS) occur when one confronts a stressor, eliciting psychotic denial, autistic withdrawal, distortion, delusional projection, fragmentation, or concretization.

=== Level 1: action defences ===
Action defence mechanisms are used unconsciously to help reduce stress. Examples include passive aggression, help-rejecting complaining, and acting out, which channel impulses into appropriate behaviors. These processes offer short-term relief but may prevent lasting improvements in the root causes.

=== Level 2: major image-distorting defences ===
Major image-distorting mechanisms are used to guard a person's own image and their ego from perceived dangers, conflicts, or fears. These processes involve simplifying the way a person sees themselves and others. Splitting of one's self or other's image and projective identification both work on an unconscious level and help to alter reality, enabling these individuals to uphold a more positive view of their lives or situations.

=== Level 3: disavowal defences ===
Disavowal defence mechanisms include the rejection or denial of unpleasant ideas, emotions, or events. People sometimes distance themselves from certain parts of their identity, whether they are aware of it or not, in order to avoid feelings of unease or discomfort. Mechanisms such as autistic fantasy, rationalization, denial, and projection, can help shield one's ego from feelings of stress or guilt that arise when facing reality.

=== Level 4: minor image-distorting defences ===
Level four defence mechanisms serve the purpose of protecting an individual's self-esteem. There are several processes that people may use, such as devaluation and idealization of self-image and others-image, as well as omnipotence. These mechanisms assist in preserving a healthy self-perception during times of psychological instability.

=== Level 5: neurotic defences ===
These defences are strategies that the mind uses without conscious awareness in order to manage anxiety, which is often a result of ongoing conflicts. There are several mechanisms that people use to cope with distressing thoughts and emotions. These include repression, displacement, dissociation, and reaction formation. These defences may offer brief relief; however, they can inhibit development in oneself and contribute to harmful habits.

=== Level 6: obsessional defences ===
Obsessional defences refer to mental techniques that individuals utilize to cope with anxiety by exerting control over their thoughts, emotions, or behaviors. People may rely on strict routines, a desire for perfection, or a strong need for order to maintain a sense of control and avoid facing uncertainty or undesirable impulses. These defences, such as isolation of affects, intellectualization, and undoing, provide a short-term solution but can result in the development of obsessive-compulsive behaviors and hinder one's capacity to express and adapt to emotions.

=== Level 7: high-adaptative defences ===
This level of defences allow individuals to cope with stressors, challenges, and trauma. Mechanisms, such as sublimation, affiliation, self-assertion, suppression, altruism, anticipation, humor, and self-observation play a role in building resilience. They allow individuals to redefine challenges in a beneficial way that maximizes positivity. In doing so, they enhance their psychological well-being and encourage adaptation.

== Relation with coping ==
There are multiple different perspectives on how the construct of defence relates to the construct of coping. While the two concepts share multiple similarities, there is a distinct difference between them that depends on the state of consciousness the process is carried out in. The process of coping involves using logic and reason to stabilize negative emotions and stressors. This differs from defence, which is driven by impulse and urges.

Similarities between coping and defence mechanisms have been extensively studied in relation to various mental health conditions, such as depression, anxiety, and personality disorders. Research indicates that these mechanisms often follow specific patterns within different disorders, with some, like avoidant coping, potentially exacerbating future symptoms. This aligns with the vulnerability-stress psychopathology model, which involves two core components: vulnerability (non-adaptive mechanisms and processes) and stress (life events). These factors interact to create a threshold for the development of mental disorders. The types of coping and defence mechanisms used can either contribute to vulnerability or act as protective factors. Coping and defence mechanisms work in tandem to balance out feelings of anxiety or guilt, categorizing them both as a "mechanisms of adaptation."

== Criticism ==
Criticism regarding defence mechanisms focus on the lack of empirical evidence as most of the evidence for defence mechanisms comes from clinical observations and subjective interpretations.

Critics have stated that due to the difficult nature of studying defence mechanisms that future research should distinguish more between the theoretical constructs of defence mechanisms and actual behaviors.

== See also ==
- Coherence therapy § Symptom coherence
- Personality disorder – Maladaptive patterns of behavior
- Cognitive dissonance – Mental phenomenon of holding contradictory beliefs
- Experiential avoidance – Attempts to avoid internal experiences
- List of cognitive biases
- List of maladaptive schemas – List on psychotherapy topic
- Motivated forgetting – Psychological defense mechanism
- Motivated reasoning – Processing personal/social information
- Narcissistic defences – Mental processes which preserve the self
- Psychological resistance – Phenomenon in clinical psychology
- Self-enhancement – Type of motivation
