= Undoing (psychology) =

Psychological concept

Undoing is a defense mechanism in which a person tries to cancel out or remove an unhealthy, destructive or otherwise threatening thought or action by engaging in contrary behavior. For example, after thinking about being violent with someone, one would then be overly nice or accommodating to them. It is one of several defense mechanisms proposed by the founder of psychoanalysis Sigmund Freud during his career, many of which were later developed further by his daughter Anna Freud. The German term "Ungeschehenmachen" was first used to describe this defense mechanism. Transliterated, it means "making un-happened", which is essentially the core of "undoing". Undoing refers to the phenomenon whereby a person tries to alter the past in some way to avoid or feign disappearance of an adversity or mishap.

== Freud's development of the concept ==
Freud first described the practice of undoing in his 1909 "Notes upon a Case of Obsessional Neurosis". Here he recounted how his patient (the "Rat Man") first removed a stone from the road in case his lady's carriage should overturn upon it, and thereafter 'felt obliged to go back and replace the stone in its original position in the middle of the road'. Freud argued that his 'undoing this deed of love by replacing the stone where...her carriage might come to grief against it...was determined by a motive contrary to that which produced the first part' by hate, not love.

It was two decades later in 1926 that he formalised the ego defense as' undoing what has been done....it is, as it were, negative magic, and endeavours, by means of motor symbolism, to blow away not merely the consequences of some event (or experience or impression) but the event itself'. Freud then went on to use '"undoing" what has been done...[as] good enough grounds for re-introducing the old concept of defence, which can cover all these processes that have the same purpose—namely the protection of the ego against instinctual demands'—one of the major technical advances of his later years.

== In psychoanalysis after Freud ==
The first psychoanalytic half-century saw several writers exploring the concept of undoing in Freud's wake. Anna Freud listed it among the ego mechanisms; Ernest Jones and Ella Freeman Sharpe both wrote articles linking it with 'actions and attitudes aimed at the undoing of imaginative destructions. Strivings for reparation may...be the main motive'. Otto Fenichel devoted a substantial section of his "mechanism of defense" to summarizing past work in his encyclopedic Theory of Neurosis: he was especially interested in how 'the undoing sometimes does not consist in a compulsion to do the opposite of what has been done previously but in a compulsion to repeat the very same act...with the opposite unconscious meaning'.

The second half of the twentieth century saw little new theoretical or creative work around the concept. Jean Laplanche and J. B. Pontalis laid stress on how 'Undoing in the pathological sense is directed at the act's very reality, and the aim is to suppress it absolutely, as though time were reversed'. The Freud encyclopedia highlighted how 'Acts of expiation can be seen as forms of undoing'; George Eman Vaillant placed undoing among the neurotic defenses in his hierarchy of defense mechanisms.

Melanie Klein in her early work had written of undoing in terms of a kind of magical reparation: 'a tendency to undo harm and put objects to right magically'. Later, however, she would use it in terms of a kind of ego disintegration—'a process of undoing, or what she called "a falling into bits"'—and it was in this latter, rather different sense of the term that later Kleinians would tend to use it: 'an invitation to dissolution and undoing...leaving the mental field open for enactment and horror'.

== Automaticity ==
There is a proposal that speaks specifically about the automaticity of this counter factual thinking. This theory, as stipulated by Medvec, Madey and Gilovich (1995) states that Undoing can occur as an automatic response to a situation. Their findings involved Olympic Silver Medalists who were less happy about their achievement than the bronze medalists, even though it is known that Silver medalists have a higher honor. To the individuals, the Silver Medal represented how close they were to winning which is worse than being awarded bronze, which signified how close they were to not having a placement at all. This suggests that the counterfactual thinking was a sort of implicit way of control and was not actually deliberately employed as a mechanism.

== Further uses ==
Undoing can be used to 'explain away' habits or behaviors that are not in line with an individual's personality. For example, in the case of a person who is well organised in the workplace, yet always forgets to pay bills on time at home, Freudian psychologists could argue that his tardiness with bills is an undoing of his desire to be orderly, or vice versa. Freud has been criticized regarding examples such as this because his theory is so complicated that most problems can be explained by another part of the theory.

For some people undoing can be used to reduce cognitive dissonance, the uncomfortable feeling created when an attitude and an action, or two attitudes are in conflict with one another.

In criminal profiling the term refers to a pattern of behavior by which an offender tries to undo their crime symbolically, e.g. by painting the face of a person killed by the perpetrator, covering up and decorating the corpse with flowers, personal belongings and jewelry, or folding the hands, imitating a laying-out.

== Effects of positive emotions ==
Happiness, joy, love, excitement are all positive emotions and there is no arguing that these emotions contribute in large to how we act, how we think, and what we do. In contrast there are also negative feelings such as sadness that can lead us to act in certain ways that may not necessarily be good. Studies have been performed that have shown that positive emotions can be used to "correct" or "undo" the effects of negative emotions. Barbara Fredrickson and Robert Levenson have come up with the undoing hypothesis. In essence what the hypothesis states is that people might hold in the effects of their positive emotions to counterbalance the effects of their negative emotions. Overall positive emotions help lower the potentially health-damaging cardiovascular reactivity that lingers following negative emotions. This effect may be especially important for those most at risk for developing coronary heart disease.

== Effects of negative emotions ==
Negative emotions, including anger and fear, can be seen as the evolution of human adaptation to survival in life-threatening situations. For example, anger shows the sign of attack, fear shows the sign of escape. These emotional reactions interconnect with our mind and body. These negative emotions are influenced by the physiological support mechanisms, such as the physical energy, that relies on the body to mobilize at an optimal level for individual action to react. In the attack or flee situation, it produces heightened cardiovascular re-activity that redistributes blood flow to relevant skeletal muscles. However, in extreme cases, negative emotions will cause damage to people's health in their cardiovascular re-activity.

== Classification ==
Undoing is tentatively classified at the "Mental inhibitions (compromise formation) level" in DSM-IV-TR's proposed Defensive Functioning Scale (under Appendix B, "Criteria Sets and Axes Provided for Further Study.")
