= Rationalization (psychology) =

Psychological defense mechanism

Rationalization is a defense mechanism (ego defense) in which apparent logical reasons are given to justify behavior that is motivated by unconscious instinctual impulses. It is an attempt to find reasons for behaviors, especially one's own. Rationalizations are used to defend against feelings of guilt, maintain self-respect, and protect oneself from criticism.

Rationalization happens in two steps:

1. A decision, action, judgement is made for a given reason, or no (known) reason at all.
2. A rationalization is performed, constructing a seemingly good or logical reason, as an attempt to justify the act after the fact (for oneself or others).

Rationalization encourages irrational or unacceptable behavior, motives, or feelings and often involves ad hoc hypothesizing. This process ranges from fully conscious (e.g. to present an external defense against ridicule from others) to mostly unconscious (e.g. to create a block against internal feelings of guilt or shame). People rationalize for various reasons—sometimes when we think we know ourselves better than we do. Rationalization may differentiate the original deterministic explanation of the behavior or feeling in question.

== History ==
Quintilian and classical rhetoric used the term color for the presenting of an action in the most favorable possible perspective. Laurence Sterne in the eighteenth century took up the point, arguing that, were a man to consider his actions, "he will soon find, that such of them, as strong inclination and custom have prompted him to commit, are generally dressed out and painted with all the false beauties [color] which, a soft and flattering hand can give them".

== DSM definition ==
According to the DSM-IV, rationalization occurs "when the individual deals with emotional conflict or internal or external stressors by concealing the true motivations for their own thoughts, actions, or feelings through the elaboration of reassuring or self serving but incorrect explanations".

== Examples ==
=== Individual ===
- Rationalization can be used to avoid admitting disappointment: "I didn't get the job that I applied for, but I didn't really want it in the first place."

Egregious rationalizations intended to deflect blame can also take the form of ad hominem attacks or DARVO. Some rationalizations take the form of a comparison. Commonly, this is done to lessen the perception of an action's negative effects, to justify an action, or to excuse culpability:

- "At least [what occurred] is not as bad as [a worse outcome]."
- In response to an accusation: "At least I didn't [worse action than accused action]."
- As a form of false choice: "Doing [undesirable action] is a lot better than [a worse action]."
- In response to unfair or abusive behavior from a separate individual or group to the person: "I must have done something wrong if they treat me like this."

Based on anecdotal and survey evidence, John Banja states that the medical field features a disproportionate amount of rationalization invoked in the "covering up" of mistakes. Common excuses made are:

- "Why disclose the error? The patient was going to die anyway."
- "Telling the family about the error will only make them feel worse."
- "It was the patient's fault. If he wasn't so (sick, etc.), this error wouldn't have caused so much harm."
- "Well, we did our best. These things happen."
- "If we're not totally and absolutely certain the error caused the harm, we don't have to tell."
- "They're dead anyway, so there's no point in blaming anyone."

In 2018, Muel Kaptein and Martien van Helvoort developed a model, called the Amoralizations Alarm Clock, that covers all existing amoralizations in a logical way. Amoralizations, also called neutralizations, or rationalizations, are defined as justifications and excuses for deviant behavior. Amoralizations are important explanations for the rise and persistence of deviant behavior. There exist many different and overlapping techniques of amoralizations.

=== Collective ===
- Collective rationalizations are regularly constructed for acts of aggression, based on exaltation of the in-group and demonization of the opposite side: as Fritz Perls put it, "Our own soldiers take care of the poor families; the enemy rapes them".
- Celebrity culture can be seen as rationalizing the gap between rich and poor, powerful and powerless, by offering participation to both dominant and subaltern views of reality.

== Psychoanalysis ==
Ernest Jones introduced the term "rationalization" to psychoanalysis in 1908, defining it as "the inventing of a reason for an attitude or action the motive of which is not recognized"—an explanation which (though false) could seem plausible. The term (Rationalisierung in German) was taken up almost immediately by Sigmund Freud to account for the explanations offered by patients for their own neurotic symptoms.

As psychoanalysts continued to explore the glossary of unconscious motives, Otto Fenichel distinguished different sorts of rationalization—both the justifying of irrational instinctive actions on the grounds that they were reasonable or normatively validated and the rationalizing of defensive structures, whose purpose is unknown on the grounds that they have some quite different but somehow logical meaning.

Later psychoanalysts are divided between a positive view of rationalization as a stepping stone on the way to maturity, and a more destructive view of it as splitting feeling from thought, and so undermining the powers of reason.

== Cognitive dissonance ==
Leon Festinger highlighted in 1957 the discomfort caused to people by awareness of their inconsistent thought. Rationalization can reduce such discomfort by explaining away the discrepancy in question, as when people who take up smoking after previously quitting decide that the evidence for it being harmful is less than they previously thought.

== See also ==
- Anangeon (or dicaeologia)
- Affirming the consequent
- Circumstantial evidence
- Cognitive inertia
- Compartmentalization (psychology)
- Confirmation bias
- Criminals from a sense of guilt
- Denialism
- Displacement (psychology)
- Doublethink
- Entitlement (psychology)
- Explanation
- Fairness
- Illusory superiority
- Intellectualization
- Just-world phenomenon
- Legitimating ideology
- Might makes right
- Minimisation (psychology)
- Motivated reasoning
- Narcissistic defenses
- Omission bias
- Psychological projection
- Psychological repression
- Rationality
- Reaction formation
- Reductionism
- Regression (psychology)
- Self-deception
- Spin (public relations)
- Splitting (psychology)
- Victim blaming
