= Reaction formation =

Type of defense mechanism in psychoanalytic theory

In psychoanalytic theory, reaction formation (German: Reaktionsbildung) is a defense mechanism in which emotions, desires and impulses that are anxiety-producing or unacceptable to the ego are mastered by exaggeration of the directly opposing tendency.

== Theory ==
Reaction formation depends on the hypothesis that:

[t]he instincts and their derivatives may be arranged as pairs of opposites: life versus death, construction versus destruction, action versus passivity, dominance versus submission, and so forth. When one of the instincts produces anxiety by exerting pressure on the ego either directly or by way of the superego, the ego may try to sidetrack the offending impulse by concentrating upon its opposite. For example, if feelings of hate towards another person make one anxious, the ego can facilitate the flow of love to conceal the hostility."

Where reaction-formation takes place, it is usually assumed that the original, rejected impulse does not vanish, but persists, unconscious, in its original infantile form. Thus, where love is experienced as a reaction formation against hate, we cannot say that love is substituted for hate, because the original aggressive feelings still exist underneath the affectionate exterior that merely masks the hate to hide it from awareness.

In a diagnostic setting, the existence of a reaction-formation rather than a 'simple' emotion would be suspected where exaggeration, compulsiveness and inflexibility were observed. For example,

[r]eactive love protests too much; it is overdone, extravagant, showy, and affected. It is counterfeit, and [...] is usually easily detected. Another feature of a reaction formation is its compulsiveness. A person who is defending himself against anxiety cannot deviate from expressing the opposite of what he really feels. His love, for instance, is not flexible. It cannot adapt itself to changing circumstances as genuine emotions do; rather it must be constantly on display as if any failure to exhibit it would cause the contrary feeling to come to the surface.

Reaction formation is an effective form of disguise, and can be utilized in many forms. For example, "solicitude may be a reaction-formation against cruelty, cleanliness against coprophilia". An analyst might explain a client's unconditional pacifism as a reaction formation against their sadism. In addition,

[h]igh ideals of virtue and goodness may be reaction formations against primitive object cathexes rather than realistic values that are capable of being lived up to. Romantic notions of chastity and purity may mask crude sexual desires, altruism may hide selfishness, and piety may conceal sinfulness.

Even more counter-intuitively, according to this model

[a] phobia is an example of a reaction formation. The person wants what he fears. He is not afraid of the object; he is afraid of the wish for the object. The reactive fear prevents the dreaded wish from being fulfilled.

The concept of reaction formation has been used to explain responses to external threats as well as internal anxieties. In the phenomenon described as Stockholm syndrome, a hostage or kidnap victim 'falls in love' with the feared and hated person who has complete power over them. Similarly, paradoxical reports exist of powerless and vulnerable inmates of Nazi camps creating 'favourites' among the guards and even collecting objects discarded by them. The mechanism of reaction formation is often characteristic of obsessional neuroses. When this mechanism is overused, especially during the formation of the ego, it can become a permanent character trait. This is often seen in those with obsessional character and obsessive personality disorders. This does not imply that its periodic usage is always obsessional, but that it can lead to obsessional behavior.

== Research ==
A few studies have found evidence for the existence of reaction formation.

Women who scored high on sex-related guilt feelings claimed lower arousal when exposed to erotic stimulus, but physiological measures showed higher than average sexual responses. When Caucasians who actually showed non-racist, egalitarian tendencies were told they scored high for racist tendencies, they gave more money to an African-American panhandler when leaving the testing lab than those who were not accused of harboring racist sentiments.

== See also ==
- Counterphobic attitude
- Displacement
- Dunning-Kruger effect
- Projection
- Repression
- Rationalization
- Regression
