= Sublimation (psychology) =

Psychological defense mechanism

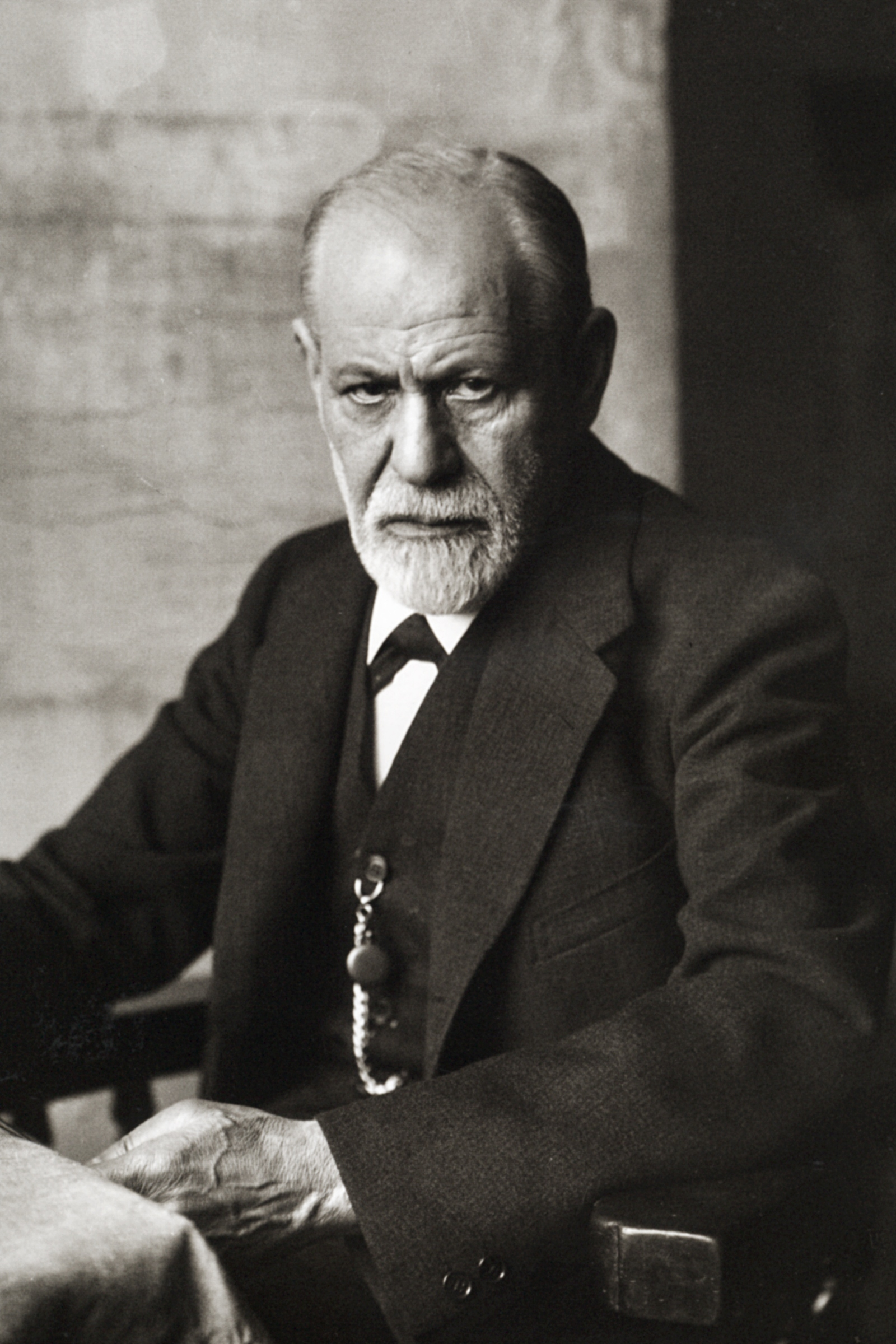
Sigmund Freud, 1926

In psychology, sublimation is a mature type of defense mechanism, in which socially unacceptable impulses or idealizations are transformed into socially acceptable actions or behavior, possibly resulting in a long-term conversion of the initial impulse.

Sigmund Freud believed that sublimation was a sign of maturity and civilization, allowing people to function normally in culturally acceptable ways. He defined sublimation as the process of deflecting sexual instincts into acts of higher social valuation, being "an especially conspicuous feature of cultural development; it is what makes it possible for higher psychical activities, scientific, artistic or ideological, to play such an 'important' part in civilized life."

Psychology textbooks present a similar view, stating that sublimation is "translating a distressing desire into an acceptable form." It occurs when displacement involves "the transformation of sexual or aggressive energies into culturally acceptable, even admirable, behaviors," and "serves a higher cultural or socially useful purpose, as in the creation of art or inventions".

== Nietzsche ==
In the opening section of Human, All Too Human entitled "Of first and last things", Friedrich Nietzsche wrote:

There is, strictly speaking, neither unselfish conduct, nor a wholly disinterested point of view. Both are simply sublimations in which the basic element seems almost evaporated and betrays its presence only to the keenest observation. All that we need and that could possibly be given us in the present state of development of the sciences, is a chemistry of the moral, religious, aesthetic conceptions and feeling, as well as of those emotions which we experience in the affairs, great and small, of society and civilization, and which we are sensible of even in solitude. But what if this chemistry established the fact that, even in its domain, the most magnificent results were attained with the basest and most despised ingredients? Would many feel disposed to continue such investigations? Mankind loves to put by the questions of its origin and beginning: must one not be almost inhuman in order to follow the opposite course?

== Freud ==
=== Psychoanalytic theory ===
In Freud's psychoanalytical theory, erotic energy is allowed a limited amount of expression, owing to the constraints of human society and civilization itself. It therefore requires other outlets, especially if an individual is to remain psychologically balanced. The ego must act as a mediator between the moral norms of the super-ego, the realistic expectations of reality, and the drives and impulses of the id. One method by which the ego lessens the stress that unacceptably strong urges or emotions can cause is through sublimation.

Sublimation (German: Sublimierung) is the process of transforming libido into "socially useful" achievements, including artistic, cultural, and intellectual pursuits. Freud considered this psychical operation to be fairly salutary compared to the others that he identified, such as repression, displacement, denial, reaction formation, intellectualisation, and projection. In The Ego and the Mechanisms of Defence (1936), his daughter, Anna, classed sublimation as one of the major 'defence mechanisms' of the psyche.

Freud developed his idea of sublimation while reading The Harz Journey by Heinrich Heine. The story is about Johann Friedrich Dieffenbach, who cut off the tails of dogs he encountered in childhood and later became a surgeon. Freud concluded that sublimation could be a conflict between the need for satisfaction and the need for security without perturbation of awareness. In an action performed many times throughout one's life, which firstly appears sadistic, thought is ultimately refined into an activity which is of benefit to mankind.

=== Sexual sublimation ===
Sexual sublimation was, according to Freud, a deflection of sexual instincts into non-sexual activity, based upon a principle akin to the conservation of energy in physics. There is a finite amount of activity, and it is converted, in a mechanistic fashion like a mechanical engine, from sexual activity to non-sexual. One such example is the case of Wolf Man, a case in which a young boy's sexual attraction to his father was redirected toward Christianity and eventually led the boy to obsessional neurosis in the form of uncontrollable sacrilegious reverence. Freud travelled to Clark University to speak about instances of sexual sublimation, but he was not wholly convinced of his own theories. 20th century psychological thought by the likes of Melanie Klein has largely relegated the idea and replaced it with subtler ideas. One such idea is that the sexual desires are not made totally non-sexual, but rather transformed into a more appropriate desire.

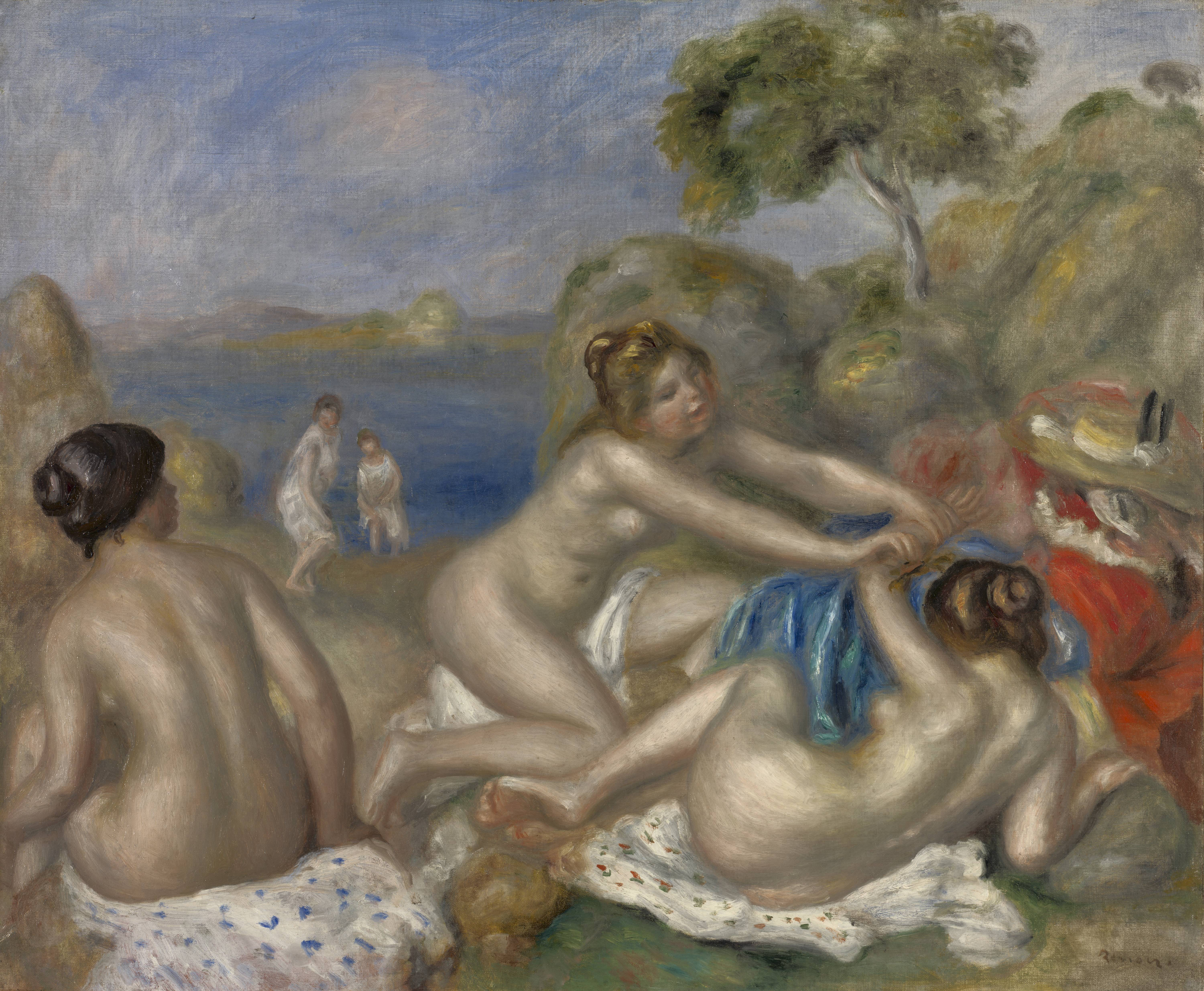
Renoir's Bathers Playing with a Crab, circa 1897

The concept is superficially evident, and anecdotal examples abound across time, occupation, and culture of origin (e.g. Wayland Young stating that "love's loss is empire's gain", Lawrence Stone's view that Western civilization has achieved so much because of sublimation, and the claims by biographers of many people from Higgins on Rider Haggard to Sinclair on George Grey). Sexual sublimation is, however, ill-defined and comes with the caveats that it rarely happens in practice, that many outcomes attributed to it are actually the results of other motivations, and that it is most definitely not some quasi-physical transfer of some sort of "sexual energy" in the modern psychoanalytical view but rather an internal thought process.

== Jung ==
C. G. Jung argued that Freud's opinion:

...can only be based on the totally erroneous supposition that the unconscious is a monster. It is a view that springs from fear of nature and the realities of life. Freud invented the idea of sublimation to save us from the imaginary claws of the unconscious. But what is real, what actually exists, cannot be alchemically sublimated, and if anything is apparently sublimated it never was what a false interpretation took it to be.

In the same article, Jung went on to suggest that unconscious processes became dangerous only to the extent that people repress them. The more people come to assimilate and recognize the unconscious, the less of a danger it becomes. In this view sublimation requires not repression of drives through will, but acknowledgement of the creativity of unconscious processes and a learning of how to work with them.

This differs fundamentally from Freud's view of the concept. For Freud, sublimation helped explain the plasticity of the sexual instincts (and their convertibility to non-sexual ends) - see libido. The concept also underpinned Freud's psychoanalytical theories, which showed the human psyche at the mercy of conflicting impulses (such as the super-ego and the id). In his private letters, Jung criticized Freud for obscuring the alchemical origins of sublimation and for attempting instead to make the concept appear scientifically credible:

Sublimation is part of the royal art where the true gold is made. Of this Freud knows nothing; worse still, he barricades all the paths that could lead to true sublimation. This is just about the opposite of what Freud understands by sublimation. It is not a voluntary and forcible channeling of instinct into a spurious field of application, but an alchymical transformation for which fire and prima materia are needed. Sublimation is a great mystery. Freud has appropriated this concept and usurped it for the sphere of the will and the bourgeois, rationalistic ethos.

== Lacan ==
=== Das Ding ===
The French psychoanalyst Jacques Lacan's exposition of sublimation is framed within a discussion about the relationship of psychoanalysis and ethics within the seventh book of his seminars. Lacanian sublimation is defined with reference to the concept Das Ding (later in his career Lacan termed this objet petit a); Das Ding is German for "the thing" though Lacan conceives it as an abstract notion and one of the defining characteristics of the human condition. Broadly speaking it is the vacuum one experiences as a human being and which one endeavours to fill with differing human relationships, objects and experiences, all of which are used to plug a gap in one's psychical needs. Unfortunately, all attempts to overcome the vacuity of Das Ding are insufficient in wholly satisfying the individual. For this reason, Lacan also considers Das Ding to be a non-Thing or vacuole.

Lacan considers Das Ding a lost object ever in the process of being recuperated by Man. Temporarily the individual will be duped by his or her own psyche into believing that this object, this person or this circumstance can be relied upon to satisfy his needs in a stable and enduring manner when in fact it is in its nature that the object as such is lost—and will never be found again. Something is there while one waits for something better, or worse, but which one wants, and again Das Ding "is to be found at most as something missed. One doesn't find it, but only its pleasurable associations." Human life unravels as a series of detours in the quest for the lost object or the absolute Other of the individual: "The pleasure principle governs the search for the object and imposes detours which maintain the distance to Das Ding in relation to its end."

=== Lacanian sublimation ===
Lacanian sublimation centres to a large part on the notion of Das Ding. His general formula for sublimation is that "it raises an object ... to the dignity of The Thing." Lacan considers these objects (whether human, aesthetic, credal, or philosophical) to be signifiers which are representative of Das Ding and that "the function of the pleasure principle is, in effect, to lead the subject from signifier to signifier, by generating as many signifiers as are required to maintain at as low a level as possible the tension that regulates the whole functioning of the psychic apparatus." Furthermore, man is the "artisan of his support system", in other words, he creates or finds the signifiers which delude him into believing he has overcome the emptiness of Das Ding.

Lacan also considers sublimation to be a process of creation ex nihilo (creating out of nothing), whereby an object, human or manufactured, comes to be defined in relation to the emptiness of Das Ding. Lacan's prime example of this is the courtly love of the troubadours and Minnesänger who dedicated their poetic verse to a love-object which was not only unreachable (and therefore experienced as something missing) but whose existence and desirability also centered around a hole (the vagina). For Lacan such courtly love was "a paradigm of sublimation." He affirms that the word 'troubadour' is etymologically linked to the Provençal verb trobar (like the French trouver), "to find". If we consider again the definition of Das Ding, it is dependent precisely on the expectation of the subject to re-find the lost object in the mistaken belief that it will continue to satisfy him (or her).

Lacan maintains that creation ex nihilo operates in other noteworthy fields as well. In pottery for example vases are created around an empty space. They are primitive and even primordial artifacts which have benefited mankind not only in the capacity of utensils but also as metaphors of (cosmic) creation ex nihilo. Lacan cites Heidegger who situates the vase between the earthly (raising clay from the ground) and the ethereal (pointing upwards to receive). In architecture, Lacan asserts, buildings are designed around an empty space and in art paintings proceed from an empty canvas, and often depict empty spaces through perspective.

In myth, Pan pursues the nymph Syrinx who is transformed into hollow reeds in order to avoid the clutches of the god, who subsequently cuts the reeds down in anger and transforms them into what we today call panpipes (both reeds and panpipes rely on their hollowness for the production of sound).

Lacan briefly remarks that religion and science are also based around emptiness. In regard to religion, Lacan refers the reader to Freud, stating that much obsessional religious behavior can be attributed to the avoidance of the primordial emptiness of Das Ding or in the respecting of it. As for the discourse of science this is based on the notion of Verwerfung (the German word for "dismissal") which results in the dismissing, foreclosing or exclusion of the notion of Das Ding presumably because it defies empirical categorisation.

== Empirical research ==
A study by Kim, Zeppenfeld, and Cohen studied sublimation by empirical methods. These investigators view their research, published 2013 in the Journal of Personality and Social Psychology, as providing "possibly the first experimental evidence for sublimation and [suggesting] a cultural psychological approach to defense mechanisms."

== Religious and spiritual views ==
=== Judaism ===
In the ethics tractate known as Pirkei Avot (4:1), the Jewish scholar Shimon ben Zoma writes that true strength is found in the sublimation of evil inclinations into self-control, and true richness is found in the sublimation of desire for more into gratitude for what is already possessed.

As espoused in its foundational text, the Tanya, the Chabad Lubavitcher sect of Judaism views sublimation of the animal soul as an essential task in life, wherein the goal is to transform animalistic and earthy cravings for physical pleasure into holy desires to connect with God.

Several scholars propose that Freud's Jewish background was central to his development of psychoanalytic theory.

=== Non-Western thought ===
Different schools of thought describe general sexual urges as carriers of spiritual essence, and have the varied names of vital energy, vital winds (prana), spiritual energy, ojas, shakti, tummo, or kundalini.

In Tantric sex, sexual energies and practices may be considered spiritual offerings. These sexual energies (eros) serve as substitution for sacrifices to deities (thanatos)

== In fiction ==
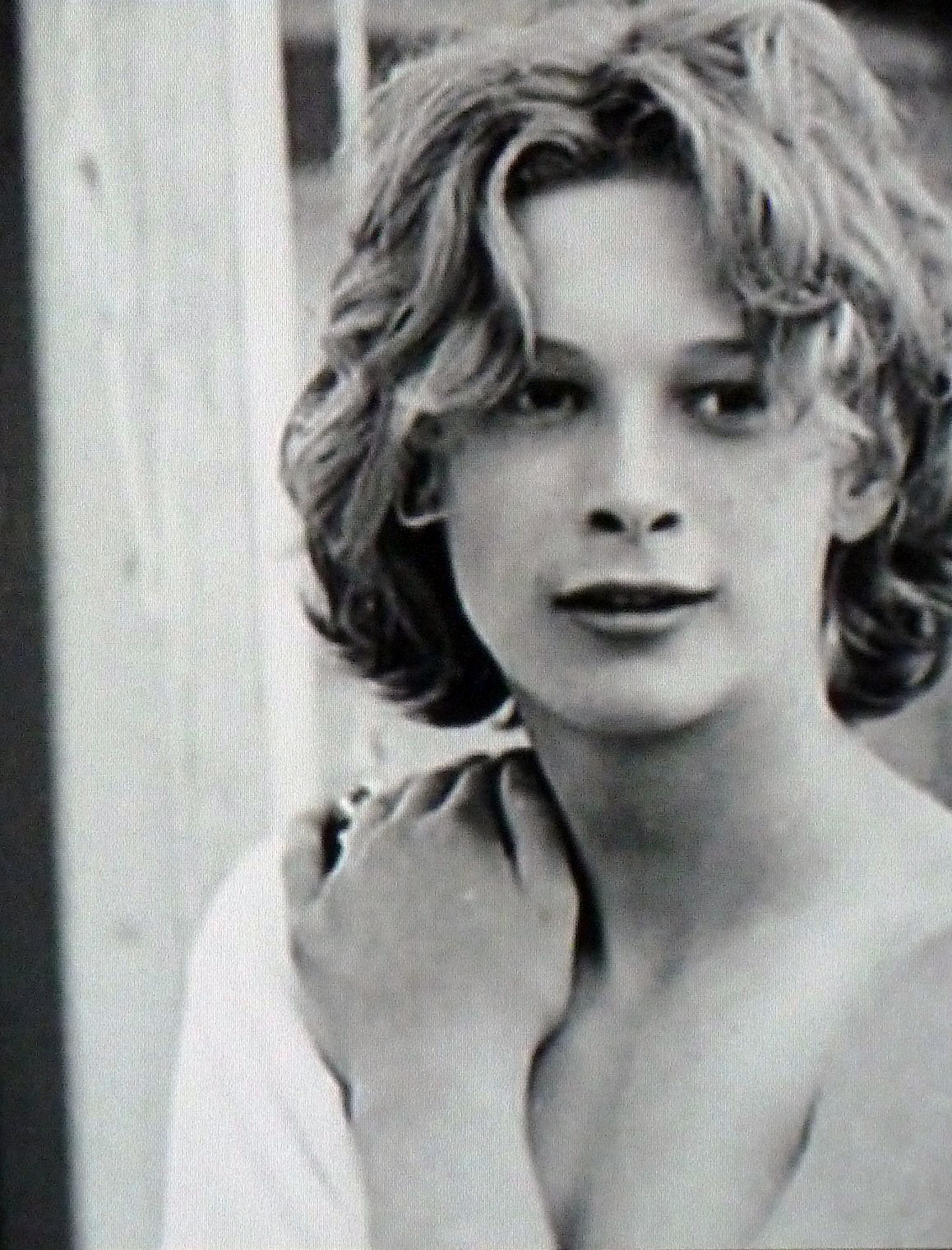
Björn Andrésen in the film adaptation of Death in Venice

- One of the best-known examples in Western literature is in Thomas Mann's novella, Death in Venice, in which the protagonist Gustav von Aschenbach, a famous writer, sublimates his desire for an adolescent boy into writing poetry.
- In The Diamond Age by Neal Stephenson, sublimation is presented as the source of the Neo-Victorians' dominance: "...it was precisely their emotional repression that made the Victorians the richest and most powerful people in the world. Their ability to submerge their feelings, far from pathological, was rather a kind of mystical art that gave them nearly magical power over Nature and over the more intuitive tribes. Such was also the strength of the Nipponese."
- In Sensation and Sublimation in Charles Dickens, author John Gordon posits that Dickens was inspired by his subconscious collective milieu; his reflections on social issues were sublimated into aspects of his literary works. For example, Dickens was not overtly antisemitic, but he sublimated the antisemitism and Blood Libel tropes of his day and expressed them in the stereotypical caricature of Fagin in Oliver Twist.
- In Henry James's Thwarted Love, author Wendy Graham argues that much of Henry James's work can be understood as an expression of how his sexuality differed from Victorian norms; his sublimation of desire into fiction was a form of self-discipline.
