= Intellectualization =

Psychological defense mechanism

In psychology, intellectualization (intellectualisation) is a defense mechanism by which reasoning is used to block confrontation with an unconscious conflict and its associated emotional stress – where thinking is used to avoid feeling. It involves emotionally removing one's self from a stressful event. Intellectualization may accompany, but is different from, rationalization, the pseudo-rational justification of irrational acts.

Intellectualization was among the first defense mechanisms identified by Sigmund Freud. He believed that memories have both conscious and unconscious aspects, and that intellectualization allows for the conscious analysis of an event in a way that does not provoke anxiety.

== Description ==
Intellectualization is a transition to reason, where the person avoids uncomfortable emotions by focusing on facts and logic. The situation is treated as an interesting problem that engages the person on a rational basis, whilst the emotional aspects are completely ignored as being irrelevant.

While Freud did not himself use the term "intellectualization", in On Negation he described clinical instances in which "the intellectual function is separated from the affective process....The outcome of this is a kind of intellectual acceptance of the repressed, while at the same time what is essential to the repression persists". Elsewhere he described an (unsuccessful) analysis with "the patient participating actively with her intellect, though absolutely tranquil emotionally...completely indifferent", while he also noted how in the obsessional the thinking processes themselves become sexually charged.

Anna Freud devoted a chapter of her book The Ego and the Mechanisms of Defense [1937] to "Intellectualization at Puberty", seeing the growing intellectual and philosophical approach of that period as relatively normal attempts to master adolescent drives. She considered that only "if the process of intellectualization overruns the whole field of mental life" should it be considered pathological.

Jargon is often used as a device of intellectualization. By using complex terminology, the focus becomes on the words and finer definitions rather than the human effects.

Intellectualization protects against anxiety by repressing the emotions connected with an event. A comparison is sometimes made between isolation (also known as isolation of affect) and intellectualization. The former is a dissociative response that allows one to dispassionately experience an unpleasant thought or event. The latter is a cognitive style that seeks to conceptualize an unpleasant thought or event in an intellectually comprehensible manner. The DSM-IV-TR thus mentions them as separate entities. It allows one to rationally deal with a situation, but may cause suppression of feelings that need to be acknowledged to move on.

== In the defense hierarchy ==
George Vaillant divided defense mechanisms into a hierarchy of defenses ranging from immature through neurotic to healthy defenses, and placed intellectualization – imagining an act of violence without feeling the accompanying emotions, for example – in the mid-range, neurotic defenses. Like rationalisation, intellectualization can thus provide a bridge between immature and mature mechanisms both in the process of growing up and in adult life.

Donald Winnicott, however, considered that erratic childhood care could lead to over-dependence on intellectuality as a substitute for mothering; and saw over-preoccupation with knowledge as an emotional impoverishment aimed at self-mothering via the mind. Julia Kristeva similarly described a process whereby "symbolicity itself is cathected...Since it is not sex-oriented, it denies the question of sexual difference."

One answer to such over-intellectualization may be the sense of humour, what Richard Hofstadter called the necessary quality of playfulness – Freud himself saying that "Humour can be regarded as the highest of these defensive processes!"

== During therapy ==
Among the intellectual defenses against analysis are a refusal to accept the logic of emotions, attempts to refute the theory of psychoanalysis, or speculating about one's own problems rather than experiencing them and attempting to change.

Such intellectualizations of therapy may form part of wider manic defenses against emotional reality. A further difficulty may be that of assimilating new and unfamiliar feelings once the defense of intellectualization begins to crack open.

Alternatively the therapist may unwittingly deflect the patient away from feeling to mere talking of feelings, producing not emotional but merely intellectual insight an obsessional attempt to control through thinking the lost feelings parts of the self. As Jung put it, "the intellectual still suffers from a neurosis if feeling is undeveloped."

== Psychoanalytic controversy ==
Freud's theory of psychoanalysis has been criticized by some for revealing intellectual grandiosity.

Jacques Lacan, however, would defend it on the basis of its intellectuality, arguing that one could "recognize bad psychoanalysts...by the word they use to deprecate all technical or theoretical research...intellectualization. Lacan himself was exposed to exactly the same criticism: "My own conception of the dynamics of the unconscious has been called an intellectualization – on the grounds that I based the function of the signifier in the forefront."

Freud himself stated that he had a vast desire for knowledge and reflected on how theorizing could become a compulsive activity.Didier Anzieu analyzed "Freud's Self-Analysis", claiming "his elaboration of psychoanalytic theory...corresponded to a setting up of obsessional defenses against depressive anxiety" – "to defend himself against [anxiety] through such a degree of intellectualization."

== Examples ==
Suppose John has been brought up by a strict father, feels hurt, and is angry as a result. Although John may have deep feelings of hatred towards his father, when he talks about his childhood, John may say: "Yes, my father was a rather firm person, I suppose I do feel some antipathy towards him even now." John intellectualizes; he chooses rational and emotionally cool words to describe experiences which are usually emotional and very painful.

A woman in therapy continues to theorise her experience to her therapist – "It seems to me that being psycho-analysed is essentially a process where one is forced back into infantilism... intellectual primitivism" – despite knowing that she "would get no answer to it, or at least, not on the level I wanted, since I knew that what I was saying was the 'intellectualising' to which she attributed my emotional troubles."
