= Psychological projection =

Attributing parts of the self to others

In psychology, psychoanalysis, and psychotherapy, projection is the mental process in which an individual attributes their own internal thoughts, beliefs, emotions, experiences, and personality traits to another person or group.

== Definition ==
The American Psychological Association Dictionary of Psychology defines projection as follows:

[T]he process by which one attributes one's own individual positive or negative characteristics, affects, and impulses to another person or group... often a defense mechanism in which unpleasant or unacceptable impulses, stressors, ideas, affects, or responsibilities are attributed to others. For example, the defense mechanism of projection enables a person conflicted over expressing anger to change "I hate them" to "They hate me." Such defensive patterns are often used to justify prejudice or evade responsibility.

== History ==
A prominent precursor in the formulation of the projection principle was Giambattista Vico. In 1841, Ludwig Feuerbach was the first enlightenment thinker to employ this concept as the basis for a systematic critique of religion.

The Babylonian Talmud (500 AD) notes the human tendency toward projection and warns against it: "Do not taunt your neighbour with the blemish you yourself have." In the parable of the Mote and the Beam in the New Testament, Jesus warned against projection:

Why do you look at the speck of sawdust in your brother's eye and pay no attention to the plank in your own eye? How can you say to your brother, 'Let me take the speck out of your eye,' when all the time there is a plank in your own eye? You hypocrite, first take the plank out of your own eye, and then you will see clearly to remove the speck from your brother's eye.

=== Freud ===
Projection (German: Projektion) was first conceptualised by Sigmund Freud in his letters to Wilhelm Fliess, and further refined by Karl Abraham and Anna Freud. Freud argued that in projection, thoughts, motivations, desires, and feelings that cannot be accepted as one's own are dealt with by being placed in the outside world and attributed to someone else. Freud would later argue that projection did not take place arbitrarily, but rather seized on and exaggerated an element that already existed on a small scale in the other person.

According to Freud, projective identification occurs when the other person introjects, or unconsciously adopts, that which is projected onto them. In projective identification, the self maintains a connection with what is projected, in contrast to the total repudiation of projection proper.

=== Further psychoanalytic development ===
Freud conceptualised projection within his broader theory of psychoanalysis and the id, ego, and superego. Later psychoanalysts have interpreted and developed Freud's theory of projection in varied ways.

Otto Fenichel argued that projection involves that which the ego refuses to accept, which is thus split off and placed in another.

Melanie Klein saw the projection of good parts of the self as leading potentially to over-idealisation of the object. Equally, it may be one's conscience that is projected, in an attempt to escape its control: a more benign version of this allows one to come to terms with outside authority.

Carl Jung considered that the unacceptable parts of the personality represented by the Shadow archetype were particularly likely to give rise to projection, both small-scale and on a national/international basis. Marie-Louise Von Franz extended her view of projection, stating that "wherever known reality stops, where we touch the unknown, there we project an archetypal image".

Erik Erikson argues that projection tends to come to the fore in normal people at times of personal or political crisis.

=== Historical clinical use ===
Drawing on Gordon Allport's idea of the expression of self onto activities and objects, projective techniques have been devised to aid personality assessment, including the Rorschach ink-blots and the Thematic Apperception Test (TAT).

== Theoretical views ==
=== Psychoanalytic theory ===
According to some psychoanalysts, projection forms the basis of empathy by the projection of personal experiences to understand someone else's subjective world. In its malignant forms, projection is a defense mechanism in which the ego defends itself against disowned and highly negative parts of the self by denying their existence in themselves and attributing them to others, breeding misunderstanding and causing interpersonal damage. Projection incorporates blame shifting and can manifest as shame dumping. It has also been described as an early phase of introjection.

== Applications ==
=== Psychopathology ===
==== Personality disorders ====
Projection is commonly found in borderline personality disorder and paranoid personalities.

In psychoanalytical and psychodynamic terms, projection may help a fragile ego reduce anxiety, but at the cost of a certain dissociation, as in dissociative identity disorder. In extreme cases, an individual's personality may end up becoming critically depleted. In such cases, therapy may be required which would include the slow rebuilding of the personality through the "taking back" of such projections.

=== Psychotherapy and counselling ===
==== Counter-projection ====
Jung wrote, "All projections provoke counter-projection when the object is unconscious of the quality projected upon it by the subject." Jung argued that what is unconscious in the recipient will be projected back onto the projector, precipitating a form of mutual acting out. In a different usage, Harry Stack Sullivan saw counter-projection in the therapeutic context as a way of warding off the compulsive re-enactment of a psychological trauma, by emphasizing the difference between the current situation and the projected obsession with the perceived perpetrator of the original trauma.

==== Psychoanalytic and psychodynamic techniques ====
The method of managed projection is a projective technique. The basic principle of this method is that a subject is presented with their own verbal portrait named by the name of another person, as well as with a portrait of their fictional opposition. The technique may be suitable for application in psychological counseling and might provide valuable information about the form and nature of their self-esteem. Bodalev, A (2000). "General psychodiagnostics".

=== Psychobiography ===
Psychological projection is one of the medical explanations of bewitchment used to explain the behavior of the afflicted children at Salem in 1692. The historian John Demos wrote in 1970 that the symptoms of bewitchment displayed by the afflicted girls could have been due to the girls undergoing psychological projection of repressed aggression.

== Types ==
In victim blaming, the victim of someone else's actions or bad luck may be offered criticism, the theory being that the victim may be at fault for having attracted the other person's hostility. According to some theorists, in such cases, the psyche projects the experiences of weakness or vulnerability with the aim of ridding itself of the feelings and, through its disdain for them or the act of blaming, their conflict with the ego.

Thoughts of infidelity to a partner may also be unconsciously projected in self-defence on to the partner in question, so that the guilt attached to the thoughts can be repudiated or turned to blame instead, in a process linked to denial. For example, a person who is having a sexual affair may fear that their spouse is planning an affair or may accuse the innocent spouse of adultery.

A bully may project their own feelings of vulnerability onto the target(s) of the bullying activity. Despite the fact that a bully's typically denigrating activities are aimed at the bully's targets, the true source of such negativity is ultimately almost always found in the bully's own sense of personal insecurity or vulnerability. Such aggressive projections of displaced negative emotions can occur anywhere from the micro-level of interpersonal relationships, all the way up to the macro-level of international politics, or even international armed conflict.

Projection of a severe conscience is another form of defense, one which may be linked to the making of false accusations, personal or political. In a more positive light, a patient may sometimes project their feelings of hope onto the therapist. People in love "reading" each other's mind involves a projection of the self into the other.

== Criticism ==
Research on social projection supports the existence of a false-consensus effect whereby humans have a broad tendency to believe that others are similar to themselves, and thus "project" their personal traits onto others. This applies to both good and bad traits; it is not a defense mechanism for denying the existence of the trait within the self.

A study of the empirical evidence for a range of defense mechanisms by Baumeister, Dale, and Sommer (1998) concluded, "The view that people defensively project specific bad traits of their own onto others as a means of denying that they have them is not well supported." However, Newman, Duff, and Baumeister (1997) proposed a new model of defensive projection in which the repressor's efforts to suppress thoughts of their undesirable traits make those trait categories highly accessible—so that they are then used all the more often when forming impressions of others. The projection is then only a byproduct of the real defensive mechanism.

== See also ==
- Accusation in a mirror
- Ad hominem
- Displacement
- Hostile attribution bias
- Introjection
- Rationalization
- Regression
- Repression
- The pot calling the kettle black
- Tu quoque
