= Chantal Chawaf =

French writer

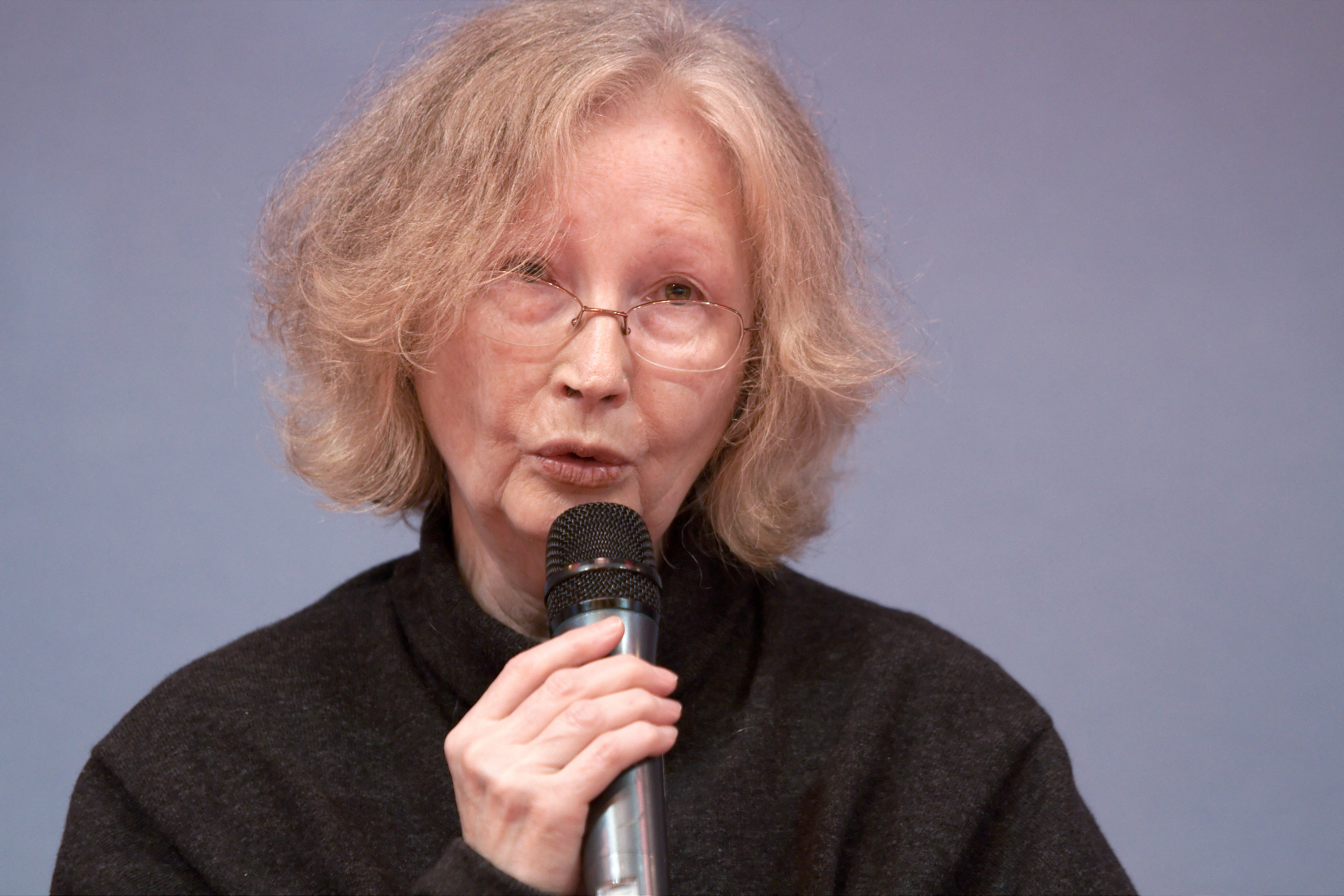
Chantal Chawaf in March 2010

Chantal Chawaf (born 1943) is a French writer.

== Biography ==
Chawaf was born in Paris during World War II. After studying art and literature at l'École du Louvre, she married and lived in Damascus for seven years where she had two children. She also traveled and lived for some years in Europe and North America.

In 1974, she published, her first book, with Editions des Femmes, the feminist press created by activists in the MLF (Mouvement de Liberation des Femmes) centered around French feminist Antoinette Fouque. Chawaf’s first book, Retable, la rêverie, started what critics called "Écriture féminine", along with the works of Hélène Cixous, Catherine Clément, Julia Kristeva, and Luce Irigaray. Other key texts by Chawaf include Cercoeur (1975) and Maternité (1979).

In her books, Chawaf explores the mother-daughter relationship and attempts to realize the potential of words to free the female unconscious, to de-intellectualize the body and to give voice to an inner experience. Chantal Chawaf's work on birth and life-giving leads, in her last decade books, to an eco-critique of contemporary society (Melusine des détritus).

She has traveled frequently in the United States where her work has been translated and studied. She also edited a collection at a publishing house in Paris from 2000 to 2010.

== Bibliography ==
- Retable. La rêverie, 1974, Editions des femmes
- Cercœur, 1975, Mercure de France
- Chair chaude (théâtre, essay), 1976, Mercure de France
- Blé de semence, 1976, Mercure de France
- Le Soleil et la Terre, 1977, Editions Jean-Jacques Pauvert
- Rougeâtre, 1978, Editions Jean-Jacques Pauvert
- Maternité, 1979, Editions Stock
- Landes, 1980, Editions Stock
- Crépusculaires, 1981, Editions Ramsay
- Les Surfaces de l'orage, 1982, Editions Ramsay
- La Vallée incarnate, 1984, Editions Flammarion
- Elwina, le roman fée, 1985, Editions Flammarion
- Fées de toujours (with Jinane Chawaf), 1987, Editions Plon
- L'intérieur des heures, 1987, Editions des femmes
- Rédemption, 1988, Editions Flammarion
- L'éclaircie, 1990, Editions Flammarion
- Vers la lumière, 1994, Editions des femmes
- Le Manteau noir, 1998, Editions Flammarion, republished as Je suis née, 2010, Editions des femmes
- Issa, 1999, Editions Flammarion
- Under the pseudonym Marie de la Montluel : Mélusine des détritus, 2002, Editions du Rocher
- L'Ombre, 2004, Editions du Rocher
- La Sanction, 2004, Editions des Femmes
- Sable noir, 2005, Editions du Rocher
- Infra- monde, 2005, Editions des Femmes
- Les Obscures, 2008, Editions des Femmes
- Je suis née, 2010, Editions des Femmes, augmented republishing of le Manteau noir
- Syria, le désert d'une passion, 2012, Editions Ixcea
- Délivrance brisée, 2013, Éditions de la Grande Ourse
- Ne quitte pas les vivants, 2015, Éditions Des femmes -Antoinette Fouque
- L'inconnue du désir, 2017, Éditions de la Grande Ourse
- Relégation, Éditions Des femmes - Antoinette Fouque, 2019

== Non fictional writings ==
- Le corps et le verbe, la langue en sens inverse (essay), 1992, Presses de la Renaissance
- L'Erotique des mots, with Régine Deforges, 2004, Editions du Rocher
- L'identité inachevée, with Adonis, 2004, Editions du Rocher

== Translated books ==
- Redemption, translated by Monique F. Nagem, 1992, Dalkey Archive Press
- Mother Love, Mother Earth, translated by M. F. Nagem, 1993, Garland Publishing
- Warmth: a bloodsong in "Plays by French and Francophone Women", translated by par C.P. Makward et J.G. Miller, 1994, University of Michigan Press: 233-246
- Fées de Toujours, with Jinane Chawaf; translated in Arabic by Samia Esber, 2000, Ministère de la Culture de Syrie, Damas
