= Postmodern feminism =

Feminism that rejects a universal female subject

Postmodern feminism is a branch of feminism that opposes a universal female subject. Drawing on postmodern philosophy, postmodern feminism questions traditional ideas about gender, identity, and power, while emphasizing the social nature of these concepts.

Postmodern feminists argue that language constructs reality and that power is embedded in social norms, shaping identities and limiting agency. They seek to challenge traditional binary oppositions (e.g., man/woman, culture/nature) and deconstruct hierarchies.

The inclusion of postmodern theory into feminist theory is not readily accepted by all feminists—some believe postmodern thought undermines the attacks that feminism attempts to create, while other feminists are in favor of the union.

== Origins ==
=== Derrida ===
Jacques Derrida (1930-2004) challenged the idea of a singular, objective truth or "transcendental signifier," arguing instead that meaning is constructed through an endless chain of signifiers that refer only to each other. He introduced the concept of différance to illustrate how language operates through contrasts and perpetual deferral of meaning. His work underscores the idea that language does not represent reality but actively constructs it.

=== Foucault ===
Michel Foucault (1926-1984) viewed power as a diffuse and pervasive force that shapes individual subjectivity. In his framework, power is not merely repressive but productive, operating through institutions, norms, and internalized self-surveillance. He suggested that recognizing these power dynamics can enable individuals to challenge and reconstitute their subjectivities.

=== French feminism ===
French feminism, as it is known today, is not a self-defined school of thought originating in France, but rather an Anglo-American construct. It describes a certain body of theory associated with French-speaking thinkers—particularly Hélène Cixous, Luce Irigaray, and Julia Kristeva. Their work is deeply rooted in Freudian and Lacanian psychoanalysis, focusing on pre-Oedipal experiences, maternal representation, and the unconscious.

The term was coined by Alice Jardine to identify an emerging trend in French intellectual circles in the 1980s, where the failure of Enlightenment ideals was being re-theorized. For feminism, this meant revisiting the sameness/difference debate through new lenses. Toril Moi's book Sexual/Textual Politics (1986) further shaped French feminism by including only Cixous, Irigaray, and Kristeva. Moi also made official a distinction between Anglo-American and French feminism: while Anglo-American feminists wanted to find a "woman-centered perspective", French feminists believed there was no identity for women but that "the feminine can be identified where difference and otherness are found."

Elaine Marks, an academic in the field of Women's Studies, noted another difference between French and American feminists: French feminists, specifically radical feminists, criticized and attacked the systems that benefit men, along with widespread misogyny as a whole, more intensely than their American counterparts.

== Theory ==
=== Centrality of language ===
Legal scholar Mary Joe Frug, a founding member of a group of legal scholars known as the Fem-Crits— itself a part of the critical legal studies movement—, suggested that one "principle" of postmodernism is that human experience is located "inescapably within language". Power is exercised not only through direct coercion, but also through the way in which language shapes and restricts our reality. She also stated that because language is always open to re-interpretation, it can also be used to resist this shaping and restriction, and so is a potentially fruitful site of political struggle.

=== Anti-essentialism ===
An early contribution to postmodern feminism is Donna Haraway’s "Cyborg Manifesto," which challenges the essentialist boundaries between human, animal, and machine. Haraway uses the metaphor of the cyborg—a hybrid of machine and organism—to argue that identity is not fixed by nature or biology, but is instead a fluid construction.

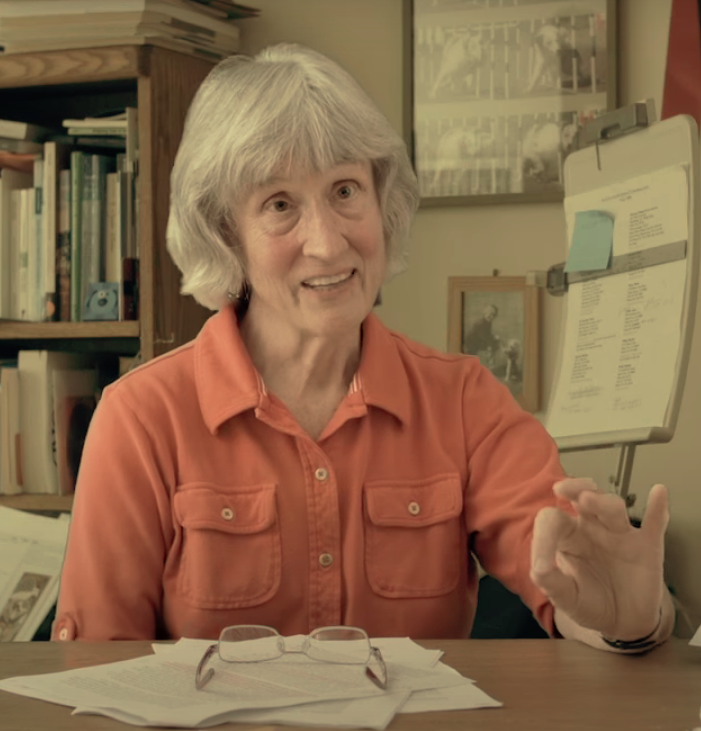
Historian of science Donna Haraway

By dismantling the "informatics of domination," Haraway critiques the traditional Western dualisms such as male/female, culture/nature, and mind/body, which have historically underpinned patriarchal and colonial structures. She suggests that by embracing the cyborg identity, feminists can move beyond the identity politics of the past and instead form affinities based on shared political goals rather than inherent biological categories.

==== Sex as a social construct ====
Postmodern feminism's major departure from other branches of feminism is perhaps the argument that not only gender, but also sex, is constructed through language, a view notably propounded in Judith Butler's 1990 book Gender Trouble. Butler examines the work of Derrida and Foucault, as well as the arguments of Simone de Beauvoir, Monique Wittig, and Luce Irigaray, on how femininity is defined with masculinity as a point of reference.

Butler criticises the distinction drawn by previous Anglophone feminists between (biological) sex and (socially constructed) gender. Drawing from Foucault and Wittig, they ask why we assume that material things (such as the body) are not subject to processes of social construction themselves. Butler argues that this does not allow for a sufficient criticism of essentialism: though recognizing that gender is a social construct, feminists assume it is always constructed in the same way. Butler's argument implies that women's subordination has no single cause or single solution.

Similarly, Frug maintains that sex is not something natural, nor is it something completely determinate and definable; rather, sex is part of a system of meaning, produced by language. Cultural mechanisms "encode the female body with meanings", and then go on to explain these meanings "by an appeal to the 'natural' differences between the sexes, differences that the rules themselves help to produce".

=== Situated knowledges ===
Central to Haraway’s postmodern framework is the concept of situated knowledges, which serves as a critique of the God's-eye view—the illusion of achieving a completely objective, neutral view of the world from nowhere. She argues that all scientific and cultural knowledge is produced from a specific, embodied perspective, and that acknowledging these positions is the only way to achieve "strong objectivity."

In the context of postmodern feminism, this theory rejects the idea of a universal "woman’s experience," instead advocating for a multifaceted understanding of reality that accounts for the intersections of race, class, and technology. This approach allows for a feminist science that is both critical of historical biases and deeply engaged with the material realities of a technologically mediated world.

== Criticism ==
There have been many critiques of postmodern feminism since it originated in the 1990s. Most of the criticism has been from modernists and feminists supporting modernist thought.

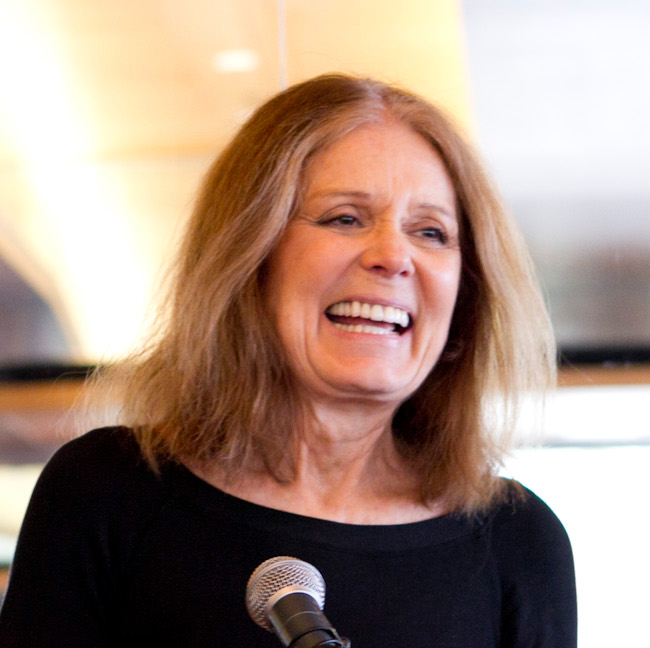
Feminist activist Gloria Steinem

Modernist critics have put a focus on the themes of relativism and nihilism as defined by postmodernism. They believe that through abandoning the values of Enlightenment thought postmodern feminism "precludes the possibility of liberating political action." This concern can be seen in critics such as Meaghan Morris, who have argued that postmodern feminism runs the risk of undercutting the basis of a politics of action based upon gender difference, through its very anti-essentialism. Alison Assiter published the book Enlightened Women (1995) to critique postmodernists and postmodern feminists alike, saying that there should be a return to Enlightenment values and modernist feminism. Gloria Steinem has also criticized feminist theory, and especially postmodernist feminist theory, as being overly academic, where discourse that is full of jargon and inaccessible is helpful to no one.

However, the very term "postmodernism" has been criticised by some theorists who have themselves been labelled as postmodern feminists: Butler, for example, rejects it as too vague to be meaningful. They argue that the term brings together a series of sometimes contradictory thoughts so that it is easier to disqualify them.

Paula Moya argues that Butler derives this rejection to postmodernism from misreadings of Cherríe Moraga's work: "She reads Moraga's statement that 'the danger lies in ranking the oppressions' to mean that we have no way of adjudicating among different kinds of oppressions—that any attempt to casually relate or hierarchize the varieties of oppressions people suffer constitutes an imperializing, colonizing, or totalizing gesture that renders the effort invalid…thus, although Butler at first appears to have understood the critiques of women who have been historically precluded from occupying the position of the 'subject' of feminism, it becomes clear that their voices have been merely instrumental to her" (Moya, 790). Moya contends that because Butler feels that the varieties of oppressions cannot be summarily ranked, that they cannot be ranked at all; and takes a short-cut by throwing out the idea of not only postmodernism, but women in general.

Evolutionary biologist John Maynard Smith sharply criticised postmodern feminism and characterised it as impossible to accept by science due to its rejection of objective reality and the idea that science can yield any factual insights about the natural world. Maynard Smith said about postmodern feminists "I do not understand how people who hold such views manage to live in a world in which so many acts of everyday life depend on the results of past scientific research. Why do they expect the light to go on when they press the switch?" to highlight what he saw as the absurdity of this position; if postmodern views of science were true and genuinely believed, then there would be no reason to trust everyday technologies whose functioning is directly built on established scientific theories being true.

As with criticism of postmodernism in general, postmodern feminism also faces criticism with its heavy focus on sexism in language.

== See also ==
- Alison Assiter
- Cyborg feminism
- Écriture féminine
- Feminist metaphysics
- Individualist feminism
- Nancy Fraser
- Post-structural feminism
- Standpoint feminism
- Structuralist feminism
- Third-wave feminism

== Bibliography ==
- Ahmed, Sara (1998). Differences that Matter: Feminist Theory and Postmodernism. Cambridge: Cambridge University Press. ISBN 9780521592253.
- Assiter, Alison (1996). Enlightened women: modernist feminism in a postmodern age. London New York: Routledge. ISBN 9780415083386.
- Kottiswari, W. S. (2008). Postmodern feminist writers. New Delhi: Sarup & Sons. ISBN 9788176258210.
- Nicholson, Linda (1990). Feminism/postmodernism. New York: Routledge. ISBN 9780415900591.
- Williams, Susan; Williams, David (1 January 1996). "A Feminist Theory of Malebashing". Michigan Journal of Gender & Law. 4 (1): 35–127. ISSN 1095-8835.
