= Post-structural feminism =

Approach to feminism influenced by post-structuralist thought

Post-structural feminism is a branch of feminism that engages with insights from post-structuralist thought. Post-structural feminism emphasizes "the contingent and discursive nature of all identities", and in particular the social construction of gendered subjectivities.

Like post-structuralism itself, the feminist branch is in large part a tool for literary analysis, but it also deals in psychoanalysis and socio-cultural critique, and seeks to explore relationships between language, sociology, subjectivity and power-relations as they impact upon gender in particular. Post-structural feminism also seeks to criticize the kyriarchy, while not being limited by narrow understandings of kyriarchal theory, particularly through an analysis of the pervasiveness of othering, the social exile of those people removed from the narrow concepts of normal.

== Origins ==
Hélène Cixous, Luce Irigaray and Julia Kristeva are considered the mothers of post-structuralist feminist theory. Their work is deeply rooted in Freudian and Lacanian psychoanalysis, focusing on pre-Oedipal experiences, maternal representation, and the unconscious. Since the 1990s, these three together with Bracha Ettinger have considerably influenced French feminism and feminist psychoanalysis.

=== Hélène Cixous ===
In the 1970s, Cixous began writing about the relationship between sexuality and language. Like many other feminist theorists, Cixous believes that human sexuality is directly tied to how people communicate in society.

In "The Laugh of the Medusa" she discusses how women have been repressed through their bodies all through history. She suggests that if women are forced to remain in their bodies as a result of male repression then they can do one of two things. The first option is to remain trapped inside their bodies, thereby perpetuating the passivity women have been a party to throughout history. The second option is to use the female body as a medium of communication, a tool through which women can speak. This is ironic given the body, the very thing women have been defined by and trapped within, can now become a vehicle in transcending the boundaries once created by the body.

In the original myth, Medusa was a beautiful woman who confronted endless hardships that were brought about by the actions of men. She was raped, killed, and beheaded by various gods. However, even in the face of tragedy and disgrace, Medusa was still portrayed as a meaningful figure. Following the moment her head was cut off, a Pegasus flew out of her body, representing the birth of beauty. In the more popular version known by most today, Medusa is a monster with hair of a thousand snakes whose glance will turn anything she looks at into stone. Cixous claims that this monstrous image of Medusa exists only because it has been directly determined by the male gaze. Even though this version of the myth is misrepresentative of the original version, people continue to believe the modern version without question.

Cixous suggests that it is important for women to expose the flaws in language that currently exist. Through the awareness of such flaws, as well as the invention of new ways of expression, women can overcome the obstacles that are constructed by what she labels a phallocentric discourse. She argues that even through attempts to expose current inadequacies, it will always be impossible to define a feminine practice of writing because this practice can never be theorized, enclosed, coded. "It will always surpass the discourse that regulates the phallocentric system; it does and will take place in areas other than those subordinated to philosophico-theoretical domination. It will be conceived of only by those who are breakers of automatisms."

=== Luce Irigaray ===
Born in Belgium in 1932, Irigaray is a French feminist, psychoanalytic, and cultural theorist. Best known works: Speculum of the Other Woman (1974) and This Sex Which is Not One (1977). She was inspired by the psychoanalytic theories of Jacques Lacan and the deconstruction of Jacques Derrida. Her work aims to reveal a perceived masculine philosophy underlying language and gestures toward a “new” feminine language that would allow women to express themselves if it could be spoken.

=== Julia Kristeva ===
Born on June 24, 1941, in Bulgaria Kristeva is a Bulgarian-French philosopher, literary critic, psychoanalyst, feminist, and (most recently) novelist, who has lived in France since the mid-1960s. She has become influential in today's international critical analysis, cultural theory, and feminism after publishing her first book Semeiotikè in 1969. Although Kristeva does not refer to her own writing as feminist, many feminists turn to her work in order to expand and develop various discussions and debates in feminist theory and criticism.

Three elements of Kristeva's thought have been particularly important for feminist theory in Anglo-American contexts:

- Her attempt to bring the body back into discourses in the human sciences;
- Her focus on the significance of the maternal body and pre-oedipal in the constitution of subjectivity; and
- Her notion of abjection as an explanation for oppression and discrimination.

== Theory ==
=== Critique of classical psychoanalysis ===
Post-structuralist feminists often criticize Freudian and Lacanian theories for reproducing patriarchal assumptions. They argue that classical psychoanalysis is based on a phallocentric model, in which male subjectivity is the standard and woman is conceived as lacking. Drawing on post-structuralist insights, these feminists insist on difference, multiplicity, and the possibility of female subjectivities beyond patriarchal structures.

Freud's analysis of gender roles and sexual identity concluded with separate male (Oedipus) and female (Electra) theories, of which Hélène Cixous was critical. For Bracha Ettinger both Oedipus and Electra are complexes that belong to the phallic paradigm. She proposes a different paradigm: the feminine-matrixial borderspace.

Building on but departing from Lacan, Irigaray asserts that the phallus has functioned as the central signifier of meaning and subjectivity, leaving no space for women to exist as autonomous subjects. To counter this, she proposes the creation of a new symbolic order that acknowledges and values genuine sexual difference.

Later post-structural feminists, influenced by Michel Foucault and Jacques Derrida, would problematize the affirmation of sexual difference and assert the multiplicity of bodies beyond binary sex.

=== Literary criticism and écriture féminine ===
Post-structural feminist literary criticism takes post-structuralism and combines it with feminist views and looks to see if a literary work has successfully used the process of mimesis on the image of the female. If successful, then a new image of a woman has been created by a woman for a woman, therefore it is not a biased opinion created by men.

Écriture féminine literally means women's writing. It is a philosophy that promotes women's experiences and feelings to the point that it strengthens the work. It is a strain of feminist literary theory that originated in France in the 1970s.

Cixous first uses this term in her essay, The Laugh of the Medusa in which she asserts:

Women must write through their bodies, they must invent the impregnable language that will wreck partitions, classes, and rhetorics, regulations and codes, they must submerge, cut through, get beyond the ultimate reserve-discourse, including the one that laughs at the very idea of pronouncing the word "silence," the one that, aiming for the impossible, stops short before the word "impossible" and writes it as "the end."

=== Abjection ===
Julia Kristeva developed the idea of the abject as that which is rejected by or disturbs social reason – the communal consensus that underpins a social order. The "abject" exists accordingly somewhere between the concepts of subject and object, representing taboo elements of the self barely separated off in a liminal space. Kristeva claims that within the boundaries of what one defines as subject – a part of oneself – and object – something that exists independently of oneself – there reside pieces that were once categorized as a part of oneself or one's identity that has since been rejected – the abject.

Judith Butler uses the concept of abjection to discuss how subjects considered normal depend on deviant subjects to define themselves. In heteronormativity, for example, the stability of heterosexual and cisgender identities depends, in part, on the rejection of homosexual and transgender subjects.

== Criticism ==
Post-structural feminism has been criticised for its abandonment of the humanistic female subject, and for tactical naivety in its rejection of any form of female essentialism.

French materialist feminists have criticized the American reduction of French feminism to its post-structuralist current. They point out that Cixous and Kristeva, among others, did not even claim to be feminists.

== Leading figures ==
- Judith Butler – explored the constricting nature of social norms in constructing 'normal' men and women; and argued for a feminism without a feminist subject, fearing the constraining influence implicit in overt identity politics.
- Hélène Cixous – argued in her best-known essay 'The Laugh of the Medusa' that writing was more important in the construction of womanhood than biology.
- Bracha Ettinger
- Jane Gallop
- Elizabeth Grosz
- Luce Irigaray – became famous for her post-structuralist work on The Sex Which is Not One (1977) and the deconstruction of the Oedipal Complex.
- Julia Kristeva
- Teresa de Lauretis
- Joan Wallach Scott
- Monique Wittig

== Literary examples ==
- The heroine of Nice Work admits that, when younger, she "allowed myself to be constructed by the discourse of romantic love for a while"; but adds that she soon came to realise that "we aren't unique individual essences existing prior to language. There is only language".
- The heroine of Possession, a novel by A. S. Byatt, more ruefully acknowledges that "we live in the truth of what Freud discovered...we question everything except the centrality of sexuality - Unfortunately feminism can hardly avoid privileging such matters".

== See also ==
- Deconstruction
- Feminist literary criticism
- Feminist psychoanalytic theory
- Lacanianism
- Postmodern feminism
- Phallogocentrism
- Queer theory
