= Academic bias =

Bias of scholars allowing their beliefs to shape their research

Academic bias is the bias or perceived bias in academia shaping research and the scientific community. Academic bias can involve discrimination based on race, sex, religion, ideology or protected group. One study sent a questionnaire to students and staff in a range of American universities. 44% of undergraduates and 27% of professors claimed that they had witnessed overt biases within the classroom. Respondents claimed that bias was directed at individuals because of their sexual orientation, ethnicity, race, sex, religion and class. The types of bias witnessed involved stereotyping, offensive humour, social isolation, slurs and insults. Academic bias can result in a citation bias, suppress scientific dissent and prevent the discovery of scientific truth.

== By politics or ideology ==
Conservative activists such as David Horowitz have argued that there is a bias against Christians and conservatives in academia. Barry Ames et al., John Lee and Henry Giroux have argued that these claims are based upon anecdotal evidence that would not reliably indicate systematic bias, and that the divide is due to self-selection due to conservatives simply being less likely to pursue an academic career. Russell Jacoby has argued that claims of academic bias have been used to push measures that infringe on academic freedom.

One study of academic philosophers found that while half of respondents believed that ideological discrimination was wrong, a significant minority believed discrimination against individuals with opposing ideologies was justified. A 2017 paper argued that left-wing ideologies had taken over criminology in the 1960s and 1970s, observing a massive increase in research around fields such as radical, Marxist and feminist criminology. The paper's authors argued this resulted in bias, as the ideology of scientists within the field influenced both the acceptance of certain theories and the rejection of others; criminologists of this period came to regard criminology as being about criticising the social structure of society and those who supported the status quo. The authors also argue that even in the modern day, much of the writing in criminology remains primarily political in both origin and purpose. A 2018 study argued that since groups seen as deviant from the norm are frequently seen as in need of explanation, if bias against conservatives existed, then conservatives and conservatism should be seen as more in need of explanation than liberals and liberalism, as a liberal-biased science would see them as deviant and that they would be described more negatively. This was confirmed by the results of the study. Other researchers also argue that political bias manifests in scientific research, influencing how ideological groups are described, what measurements are used, the interpretation of results and which results are published.

A 2018 study found bias amongst criminal law students, with students engaging in motivated reasoning favourable to their political in-group and demonstrating bias towards their political in-group. Mark Horowitz also argues that researchers' political views can bias their research.

A 2005 paper argued that, controlling for student ability, there was no evidence of any disciplines being biased against conservative students in grading. In contrast, the researchers did find some disciplines, such as economics and business, where conservative students achieved higher grades than would be expected by student ability. The authors concluded that this was unlikely to be due to any explicit or implicit bias in these disciplines, instead arguing that it was likely due to differences in student interest in subject matter, as well as possibly due to differences in discipline teaching methodology interacting with student personalities and values.

Justin Tetrault argues that research into hate groups relied too much upon stereotypes rather than rigorous analysis, likely because said stereotypes appealed to researchers' own beliefs.

It has been argued that apparent evidence of a "prejudice gap" between right-wingers and left-wingers—the idea that right-wingers are more prejudiced than left-wingers—was caused by researchers having not measured groups that left-wingers would be prejudiced towards. It has been suggested that this was because this was not regarded as prejudice or was not seen as worthy of investigation. Christine Reyna argues that ideological bias can affect how scales are constructed and interpreted in multiple ways. Lee Jussim argues that right-wing individuals were classified as "cognitively rigid", however he argues this label is misleading because what studies indicate is that right-wing individuals were less willing to change their beliefs and to be open to new experiences relative to left-wing individuals but this did not make them "rigid" in any absolute sense and that absent any absolute measure as to how cognitively flexible a person should be, labels such as "rigid" were meaningless. A 2019 study by the researchers measuring "actively open-minded thinking" noted that the researchers' original scale was biased against religious individuals due to test items, skewing correlations, and that the team had not realised this error for almost two decades, requiring a new scale.

Some scholars, such as J. F. Zipp, have said that studies on the political orientations of professors are faulty, having focused on unrepresentative institutions and fields; when taken as a whole, they say that academia has become more moderate over time.

A 2019 study of European universities argued that while university professors were more left-wing and liberal than other professions, professors did not display a higher level of homogeneity in political views (aside from views on immigration) than other professions such as CEOs did, suggesting European universities are not exclusionary compared to other institutions.

The American Council of Trustees and Alumni, a conservative group, argues that course curriculums betray a progressive bias. However, John Lee argues that this research is not based on a probability sample and uses a research design that cannot rule out explanations other than political bias. Furthermore, research suggests little or no leftward movement among college students while they are in college.

Academic bias has also been argued as a problem due to discrimination against conservative students. Research has indicated that conservative Christians may experience discrimination on colleges and universities, but these studies are anecdotal and rely on self-reported perceptions of discrimination. For example, the Hyers' study includes "Belief Conflicts" and "Interaction Difficulties" as discriminatory events. However, other work suggests that very few students experience discrimination based on political ideology.

Phillip Gray argues that ideological bias in political science risks creating "blind spots", whereby certain ideas and assumptions are just accepted as normal and not challenged. Gray argues that this could mean that issues that concern the ideology of the dominant majority could receive a lot of focus, while issues that concern less prominent ideologies could be seen as less worthy of investigation and thus be consequently understudied. This risks resulting in a fairly ideologically homogenous field whereby certain "givens" are just accepted and thus not examined. In addition, Gray argues that this means that certain studies are not given adequate examination if they confirm the dominant group's ideological priors, even if the studies are flawed. Gray further argues that ideological bias in academia risks portraying other political groups not as another group of actors with their own beliefs but rather as a threat (too ignorant or prejudiced to know what is good) or menace (inherently inclined towards destructive acts and policies). This results in these groups being portrayed as dysfunctional and requiring diagnosis rather than understanding; while Gray does not believe political science blatantly "otherizes" its ideological outgroups, he does argue that there is an implicit "diagnostic" attitude towards groups that disagree with the majority's view.

=== Politicization of science ===
Cofnas et al. argue that activism within social science can undermine trust in scientists. Brandt et al. argue that bias can limit what topics are researched and thus limit scientific knowledge as a whole. In addition, political bias in social science can risk creating a perception amongst the general public that the scientific field is producing politically biased findings and thus not worthy of receiving public funds.

Surveys show that a college education tends to have a "regression to the mean" effect whereby both left-wing students and right-wing students moderate their views. Students also become more supportive of dissent and free speech during their education.

== By religion ==
An early audit study published in 1986 suggested that entrance into an American clinical psychology graduate program was negatively affected by whether the applicant was a fundamentalist Christian. One study examined the comments made by members of an American medical school admission committee towards 21 Christian applicants. It concluded that applicants were more likely to be criticised when responding to a question on abortion with an anti-abortion response. George Yancey says that academics are less likely to hire a colleague if they find out that the colleague is either religiously or politically conservative, and discrimination exists against fundamentalists, evangelicals and to a lesser extent Republicans, though only within certain cultural contexts.

Brent D. Slife and Jeffrey S. Reber assert that an implicit bias against theism limits possible insights in the field of psychology.

== By nationality or race ==
Jeff Colgan argues that, amongst international relations data, there can be interpretive biases by researchers depending on their nationality, with bias towards the United States being common due to a large number of scholars being from the US. In this context, it has been proposed that implicit bias based on the region from which an Academic comes (e.g. it has been argued that when scholarly manuscripts are reviewed by peers the return address influences perceptions of Academic quality) can be counteracted by improved intercontinental Academic collaboration.

== By sex or gender ==
A vignette study found academic discrimination against men in Germany.

== Self-censorship ==
Studies have also suggested that one reason for the unwillingness of conservatives to pursue academic careers may be because conservatives prefer higher paying jobs and are not as tolerant of controversial ideas as progressives. Empirical support for self-selection can be found in the work of Neil Gross. Gross conducted an audit study whereby he sent emails to directors of graduate study programs. He varied the emails so that some of them indicated the student supported the presidential candidacy of Senator John McCain, some of them supported the presidential candidacy of then Senator Barack Obama and some of them were politically neutral. He found that the directors of graduate study programs did not significantly vary in their treatment of the senders of the letters regardless of the implied political advocacy of that sender. His work suggests an absence of systematic discrimination against political conservatives.

== Logocentrism and phonocentrism ==
Academic bias can refer to several types of logocentrism or phonocentrism. or the belief that some sciences and disciplines rank higher than others.

== Funding and peer review bias ==
Asle Toje argues that while academic bias does not seem to make scholars dishonest, it does affect what questions are deemed worthy of research and what conclusions are deemed career-advancing. Toje also argues that the field of social science is filled with biased terminology that a priori discredits certain perspectives while lending credence to others. Similarly, Honeycutt et al. argue that bias can affect not only what questions get asked but how they are asked – they observe that the debate of whether rightists were more biased than leftists or if the two were equally biased failed to consider if leftists were more biased as a possible debate point.

== See also ==
- Anti-intellectualism
- Antiscience
- Board of education
- In-group favoritism
- Intellectual diversity
- Legacy preferences
- Political censorship
- Replication crisis
- Repression of science in the Soviet Union
