= Olivier Morel =

Olivier Morel may refer to:

- Olivier Morel (filmmaker), French-American filmmaker, scholar and writer
- Olivier Morel (tennis) (born 1972), French tennis player
