= Hélène Cixous =

French writer (born 1937)

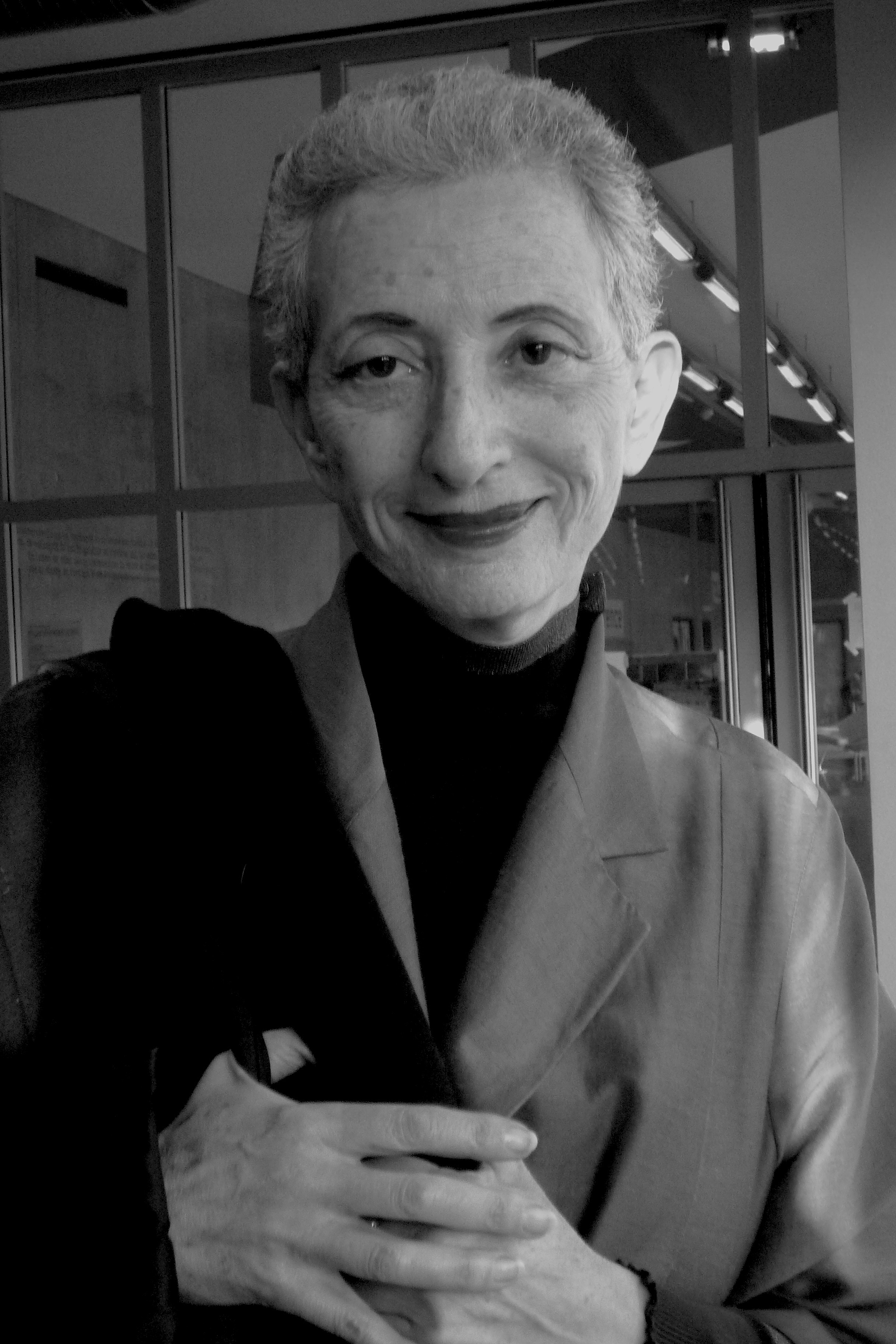
- Hélène Cixous, Sept. 2011
- Born: 5 June 1937 (age 89); Oran, French Algeria

Education
- Education: University of Paris
- Doctoral advisor: Jean-Jacques Mayoux

Philosophical work
- Era: Contemporary philosophy
- Region: Western philosophy
- School: Continental philosophy Post-structural feminism French feminism
- Institutions: University of Bordeaux; University of Paris; University of Paris VIII; European Graduate School; Cornell University
- Doctoral students: Frédéric Regard
- Main interests: Literary criticism
- Notable ideas: Écriture féminine, the philosophical generation of the "incorruptibles"

Hélène Cixous (/sɪkˈsuː/ sihk-SOO; French: [siksu]; born 5 June 1937) is a French writer, playwright and literary critic. During her academic career, she was primarily associated with the Centre universitaire de Vincennes (today's University of Paris VIII), which she co-founded in 1969 and where she created the first centre of women's studies at a European university. Known for her experimental writing style and great versatility as a writer and thinker, she has written more than seventy books dealing with multiple genres: theatre, literary and feminist theory, art criticism, autobiography and poetic fiction.

She first gained attention in 1969 with her first work of fiction, Dedans (Inside), a semi-autobiographical novel which won the Prix Médicis and explored the themes of identity, memory, death and writing. She is perhaps best known for her 1976 article "The Laugh of the Medusa", which established her as one of the early thinkers in post-structural feminism. She has collaborated with several artists and directors, such as Adel Abdessemed, Pierre Alechinsky, Simone Benmussa, Jacques Derrida, Simon Hantaï, Daniel Mesguich and Ariane Mnouchkine. She is considered a strong contender for the Nobel Prize in Literature.

== Life and career ==
=== Personal life ===
Cixous was born in Oran, French Algeria, to Jewish parents, Eve Cixous, née Klein, (1910–2013) and Georges Cixous (1909–1948). Georges Cixous, a physician who had written his dissertation on tuberculosis, died of the disease in 1948. Eve Cixous became a midwife in Algiers following his death, "until her expulsion with the last French doctors and midwives in 1971." Cixous' brother, Pierre, "a medical student and a supporter of Algerian independence" was condemned to death in 1961 by the Organisation armée secrète, and joined Cixous in Bordeaux. Her mother and brother returned to Algeria following the country's independence in 1962. They were arrested, and Cixous "obtained their release with the help of Ahmed Ben Bella's lawyer."

Cixous married Guy Berger in 1955, with whom she had three children, Anne-Emmanuelle (b. 1958), Stéphane (1960–1961), and Pierre-François (b. 1961). Cixous and Berger divorced in 1964.

=== Academic career ===
Cixous earned her agrégation in English in 1959 and her Doctorat ès lettres in 1968. Her main focus, at this time, was English literature and the works of James Joyce. Cixous became assistante at the University of Bordeaux in 1962, served as maître assistante at the Sorbonne from 1965 to 1967, and was appointed maître de conférence at Paris Nanterre University in 1967.

In 1968, following the French student riots, Cixous was charged with founding the University of Paris VIII, "created to serve as an alternative to the traditional French academic environment." Cixous would, in 1974, found the University's centre for women's studies, the first in Europe. Cixous is a professor at the University of Paris VIII and at the European Graduate School in Saas-Fee, Switzerland.

=== Publications ===
In 1968, Cixous published her doctoral dissertation L'Exil de James Joyce ou l'Art du remplacement (The Exile of James Joyce, or the Art of Displacement) and the following year she published her first novel, Dedans (Inside), a semi-autobiographical work that won the Prix Médicis.

She has published widely, including twenty-three volumes of poems, six books of essays, five plays, and numerous influential articles. She published Voiles (Veils) with Jacques Derrida and her work is often considered deconstructive. In introducing her Wellek Lecture, subsequently published as Three Steps on the Ladder of Writing, Derrida referred to her as the greatest living writer in his language (French). Cixous wrote a book on Derrida titled Portrait de Jacques Derrida en jeune saint juif (Portrait of Jacques Derrida as a Young Jewish Saint). Her reading of Derrida finds additional layers of meaning at a phonemic rather than strictly lexical level. In addition to Derrida and Joyce, she has written monographs on the work of the Brazilian writer Clarice Lispector, on Maurice Blanchot, Franz Kafka, Heinrich von Kleist, Michel de Montaigne, Ingeborg Bachmann, Thomas Bernhard, and the Russian poet Marina Tsvetaeva. Cixous is also the author of essays on artists, including Simon Hantaï, Pierre Alechinsky and Adel Abdessemed to whom she has devoted two books.

Along with Luce Irigaray and Julia Kristeva, Cixous is considered one of the mothers of poststructuralist feminist theory. In the 1970s, Cixous began writing about the relationship between sexuality and language. Like other poststructuralist feminist theorists, Cixous believes that our sexuality is directly tied to how we communicate in society. In 1975, Cixous published her most influential article "Le Rire de la Méduse" ("The Laugh of the Medusa"), which was revised by her, translated into English by Paula Cohen and Keith Cohen, and released in English in 1976. She has published over 70 works of criticism, fiction, dramatic writing, and poetry.

=== Film ===
Hélène Cixous is featured in Olivier Morel's 118-minute film Ever, Rêve, Hélène Cixous (France, USA, 2018).

=== Accolades and awards ===
Cixous holds honorary degrees from Queen's University and the University of Alberta in Canada; University College Dublin in Ireland; the University of York and University College London in the UK; and Georgetown University, Northwestern University, and the University of Wisconsin–Madison in the USA. In 2008 she was appointed as A.D. White Professor-at-Large at Cornell University until June 2014. On 13 October 2020, Cixous was awarded the Prix de la Principauté by Les Rencontres Philosophiques de Monaco and the Prince Pierre Foundation for her entire body of work and lifetime of achievement.

== Influences on Cixous' writing ==
Some of the most notable influences on her writings have been Jacques Derrida, Sigmund Freud, Jacques Lacan and Arthur Rimbaud.

=== Sigmund Freud ===
Psychoanalyst Sigmund Freud established the initial theories that would serve as a basis for some of Cixous' arguments in developmental psychology. Freud's analysis of gender roles and sexual identity concluded with separate paths for boys and girls through the Oedipus complex and Electra complex, theories of which Cixous was particularly critical. She joined other scholars in positing The Freudian Coverup.

=== Jacques Derrida ===
Contemporaries, lifelong friends, and intellectuals, Jacques Derrida and Cixous both grew up as French Jews in Algeria and share a "belonging constituted of exclusion and nonbelonging"—not Algerian, rejected by France, their Jewishness concealed or acculturated. In Derrida's family, "one never said 'circumcision' but 'baptism,' not 'Bar Mitzvah' but 'communion.'" Judaism cloaked in Catholicism is one example of the undecidability of identity that influenced the thinker whom Cixous calls a "Jewish Saint". Her book Portrait of Jacques Derrida as a Young Jewish Saint addresses these matters.

Through deconstruction, Derrida appropriated and employed the term logocentrism (which is not his coinage although he adapted it substantially for his needs). This is the concept that explains how Western metaphysics use of language relies on a hierarchical system that values the spoken word over the written word in Western culture. The idea of binary opposition is essential to Cixous' position on language.

Cixous and Luce Irigaray combined Derrida's logocentric idea and Lacan's primary signifier for desire (the phallus), creating the term phallogocentrism. This term focuses on Derrida's social structure of speech and binary opposition as the centre of reference for language, with the phallic being privileged and how women are only defined by what they lack; not A vs. B, but, rather A vs. ¬A (not-A).

In a dialogue between Derrida and Cixous, Derrida said about Cixous: "Helene's texts are translated across the world, but they remain untranslatable. We are two French writers who cultivate a strange relationship, or a strangely familiar relationship with the French language – at once more translated and more untranslatable than many a French author. We are more rooted in the French language than those with ancestral roots in this culture and this land."

== Major works ==
=== "The Laugh of the Medusa" (1975) ===
Cixous' critical feminist essay "The Laugh of the Medusa", originally written in French as "Le Rire de la Méduse" in 1975, was (after she revised it) translated into English by Paula Cohen and Keith Cohen in 1976. It is considered a foundational essay, particularly because it announces what Cixous called écriture féminine, a distinctive mode of writing by women and for women.

== Bibliography ==
=== Published in English ===
==== Selected books ====
- The Exile of James Joyce. Translated by Sally, A.J. New York:David Lewis; London:John Calder. 1972. ISBN 978-0-912-01212-4. OCLC 988992987.
- To Live the Orange. Translated by Liddel, Ann; Cornell, Sarah. Des Femmes. 1979. ISBN 978-2-721-00158-0. OCLC 461745151.
- Angst. Translated by Levy, Jo. London: Calder; New York: Riverrun. 1985. ISBN 978-0-714-53905-8. OCLC 993300655.
- Inside. Translated by Barko, Carol. New York: Schocken Books. 1986. ISBN 978-0-805-24019-1. OCLC 13395846.
- The Newly Born Woman. Translated by Wing, Betsy. Minneapolis: University of Minnesota Press. 1986. ISBN 978-0-816-61466-0. OCLC 949556909.
- Neutre. Translated by Birden, Loren. M.A. Thesis, University of Massachusetts at Amherst. 1988. ISBN 978-2-721-00476-5. OCLC 246612241.
- Reading with Clarice Lispector (seminar 1980-1985). Translated by Conley, Verna. London: Harvester Wheatsheaf. 1990. ISBN 978-0-745-00915-5.
- The Book of Promethea. Translated by Wing, Betsy. Lincoln: University of Nebraska Press. 1991. ISBN 978-0-803-26343-7. OCLC 317400193.
- 'Coming to Writing' and Other Essays. Translated by Cornell, Sarah; Jenson, Deborah. Cambridge, MA: Harvard University Press. 1991. ISBN 978-0-674-14436-1. OCLC 805722597.
- Readings: the poetics of Blanchot, Joyce, Kafka, Lispector, Tsvetaeva (seminar 1982-1984). Translated by Conley, Verena. London: Harvester Wheatsheaf. 1992. ISBN 978-0-745-01149-3. OCLC 916735267.
- Three Steps on the Ladder of Writing, The Welleck Library Lecture Series, University of California, Irvine (June 1990). Translated by Cornell, Sarah; Sellers, Susan. New York: Columbia University Press. 1993. ISBN 978-023-1-07659-3. OCLC 877287969.
- The Terrible but Unfinished Story of Norodom Sihanouk, King of Cambodia. Translated by Flower MacCannell, Juliet; Pike, Judith; Groth, Lollie. Lincoln: University of Nebraska Press. 1994. ISBN 978-0-803-26361-1. OCLC 832510454.
- Manna, for the Mandelstams for the Mandelas. Translated by A.F., Catherine. Minneapolis: University of Minnesota Press. 1994. ISBN 978-0-816-62114-9. OCLC 476451353.
- The Hélène Cixous Reader. Translated by Sellers, Susan. London: Routledge. 1994. ISBN 978-0-415-04929-0. OCLC 777321141.
- Rootprints: Memory and Life Writing. Translated by Prenowitz, Eric. London and New York: Routledge. 1997. ISBN 978-0-203-44359-0. OCLC 314390075.
- First Days of the Year. Translated by MacGillivray, Catherine A.F. Minneapolis: University of Minneapolis Press. 1998. ISBN 978-0-816-62117-0. OCLC 925291649.
- The Third Body. Translated by Cohen, Keith. Evanston, Ill: Hydra Books/Northwestern University. 1999. ISBN 978-0-810-11687-0. OCLC 41119060.
- Veils. Cambridge: Cambridge University Press. 2002. ISBN 978-0-804-73795-1. OCLC 48195251. co-authored with Jacques Derrida.
- Selected Plays of Hélène Cixous [in translation]. New York, N.Y.: Routledge. 2003. ISBN 978-0-415-23668-3. OCLC 1004589125.
- Portrait of Jacques Derrida as a Young Jewish Saint. Translated by Brahic, Beverley Bie. New York: Columbia University Press. 2004. ISBN 978-0-231-12825-4. OCLC 52623579.
- The writing notebooks of Hélène Cixous. Translated by Sellers, Susan. New York: Continuum. 2004. ISBN 978-1-441-18494-8. OCLC 978530581.
- Stigmata: Escaping Texts. London: Routledge. 2005. ISBN 978-0-203-02366-2. OCLC 826516507. Foreword by Jacques Derrida.
- Vera's Room: The Art of Maria Chevska. London: Black Dog. 2005. OCLC 645932288.
- Dream I Tell You. Translated by Brahic, Beverley Bie. Edinburgh: Edinburgh University Press. 2006. ISBN 978-0-748-62132-3. OCLC 474721880.
- Reveries of the Wild Woman: Primal Scenes. Translated by Bie Brahic, Beverley. Evanston, Ill: Northwestern University Press. 2006. ISBN 978-0-810-12363-2. OCLC 62857806.
- Insister of Jacques Derrida. Translated by Pignon-Ernest. Edinburgh: Edinburgh University Press. 2007. OCLC 929635178.
- Manhattan: letters from prehistory [Manhattan: lettres de la prehistorie]. Translated by Brahic, Beverly Bie. New York: Fordham University Press. 2007. ISBN 978-0-823-22775-4. OCLC 740804455.
- Love Itself: In the Letter Box. Translated by Kaufman, Peggy. Cambridge: Polity Press. 2008. ISBN 978-0-745-63989-5. OCLC 530404932.
- Hyperdream. Translated by Brahic, Beverley Bie. Cambridge, UK; Malden, MA: Polity. 2009. ISBN 978-0-745-64300-7. OCLC 488268287.
- So Close. Cambridge: Polity Press. 2009. ISBN 978-0-745-64435-6. OCLC 759676449.
- Zero's Neighbor:Sam Beckett. Translated by Milesi, Laurent. Cambridge, UK: Polity. 2010. ISBN 978-0-745-64416-5.
- Philippines. Translated by Milesi, Laurent. Cambridge: Polity. 2011. ISBN 978-0-745-64815-6. OCLC 972865912.
- Hemlock: old women in bloom. Translated by Brahic, Beverley Bie. Cambridge, UK; Malden, MA: Polity. 2011. OCLC 851339267.
- Poetry in painting : writings in contemporary arts and aesthetics. Translated by Segarra, Marta; Maso, Joana. Edinburgh: Edinburgh University Press. 2012. ISBN 9780748647453.
- White Ink: Interviews on Sex, Text and Politics. Translated by Sellers, Susan. Hoboken: Taylor and Francis. 2014. ISBN 978-1-317-49274-0. OCLC 898104202.
- Abstracts and brief chronicles of the time: I. los, a chapter (English ed.). Cambridge, UK; Malden, MA: Polity Press. 2016. ISBN 978-1-5095-0054-3.
- Death shall be dethroned: Los, a chapter, the journal. Cambridge: Polity Press. 2016. ISBN 978-1-509-50065-9. OCLC 944312591.
- Mother Homer is dead ... Translated by Kamuf, Peggy. Hoboken: Taylor and Francis. 2018. ISBN 1474425135.
- Osnabrück Station to Jerusalem. Translated by Kamuf, Peggy. New York: Fordham University Press. 2020. ISBN 9780823287635.
- Well-Kept Ruins. Translation by Beverley Bie Brahic, Seagull Books, 2022 ISBN 9781 80309 059 7
- Rêvoir. Translated by Bie Brahic, Beverley. Kolkata: Seagull Books. 2024. ISBN 978-1-803-09387-1.

==== Plays ====
- "The Conquest of the School at Madhubai," trans. Carpenter, Deborah. 1986.
- "The Name of Oedipus," trans. Christiane Makward & Miller, Judith. In: Out of Bounds: Women's Theatre in French. Ann Arbor: University of Michigan Press. 1992.
- "The Terrible but Unfinished Story of Norodom Sihanouk, King of Cambodia," trans. Juliet Flower MacCannell, Judith Pike, and Lollie Groth. University of Nebraska Press, 1994.

=== Published in French ===
==== Criticism ====
- L'Exil de James Joyce ou l'Art du remplacement (The Exile of James Joyce, or the Art of Displacement). 1969 (1985).
- Prénoms du personne. Seuil. 1974.
- Un K. incompréhensible: Pierre Goldman. Christian Bourgois. 1974.
- La jeune née. U.G.E. Collection 10/18. 1974.
- La venue à l'écriture. U.G.E. Collection 10/18. 1977.
- Entre l'écriture. Des femmes. 1986.
- L'heure de Clarice Lispector, précédé de Vivre l'Orange. Des femmes. 1989.
- Hélène Cixous, Photos de Racines. Des femmes. 1994.
- Portrait de Jacques Derrida en jeune saint juif [Portrait of Jacques Derrida as a Young Jewish Saint]. Paris: Galilée. 2001. ISBN 978-2-718-60556-2.

==== Books ====
- Le Prénom de Dieu. Bernard Grasset. 1967.
- Dedans. Paris: Grasset. 1969. ISBN 978-2-721-00298-3.
- Le Troisième Corps. Grasset. 1970. ISBN 978-2-721-00479-6.
- Les Commencements. Grasset. 1970. ISBN 978-2-721-00481-9.
- Un vrai jardin. L'Herne. 1971. ISBN 978-2-721-00473-4.
- Neutre. Grasset. 1972. ISBN 978-2-721-00476-5.
- Tombe. Le Seuil. 1973.
- Portrait du Soleil. Denoël. 1973. ISBN 978-2-020-96635-1.
- Révolutions pour plus d'un Faust. Le Seuil. 1975.
- Souffles. Des femmes. 1975. ISBN 978-2-721-00029-3.
- La. Gallimard. 1976.
- Partie. Des femmes. 1976. ISBN 978-2-721-00051-4.
- Angst. Des femmes. 1977. ISBN 978-0-714-53905-8.
- Préparatifs de noces au-delà de l'abîme. Des femmes. 1978. ISBN 978-2-721-00117-7.
- Vivre l'orange [To live the orange]. Des femmes. 1979. ISBN 978-2-721-00158-0.
- Ananké. Des femmes. 1979. ISBN 978-2-721-00157-3.
- Illa. Des femmes. 1980. ISBN 978-2-721-00180-1.
- With ou l'Art de l'innocence. Des femmes. 1981. ISBN 978-2-721-002136-.
- Limonade tout était si infini. Des femmes. 1982. ISBN 978-2-721-00230-3.
- Le Livre de Promethea [The Book of Promethea]. Paris: Gallimard. 1983. ISBN 978-2-070-70010-3..
- La Bataille d'Arcachon: un conte. Québec: Laval: Éd. Trois. 1986. ISBN 978-2-980-05352-8.
- Manne. Des femmes. 1988. ISBN 978-2-721-00369-0.
- Jours de l'an [First days of the year]. Des Femmes. 1990. ISBN 978-2-721-00394-2.
- L'Ange au secret. Des femmes. 1991. ISBN 978-2-721-00412-3.
- Déluge. Des femmes. 1992. ISBN 978-2-721-00431-4.
- Beethoven à jamais, ou l'éxistence de Dieu'. Des femmes. 1993. ISBN 978-2-721-00446-8.
- La Fiancée Juive: de la tentation. Des femmes. 1995. ISBN 978-2-721-004581-.
- Or: Les lettres de mon père. Des femmes. 1997. ISBN 978-2-721-00466-6.
- Voiles (with Jacques Derrida). Des femmes. 1998. ISBN 978-2-718-60504-3.
- Osnabrück. Des femmes. 1999. ISBN 978-2-721-00477-2.
- Les Rêveries de la femme sauvage. Scènes primitives. Galilée. 2000.
- Le Jour où je n'étais pas là. Galilée. 2000.
- Benjamin à Montaigne. Il ne faut pas le dire. Galilée. 2001.
- Manhattan. Lettres de la préhistoire. Galilée. 2002.
- Rêve je te dis. Galilée. 2003.
- L'Amour du loup et autres remords. Galilée. 2003.
- Tours promises. Galilée. 2004.
- L'amour même dans la boîte aux lettres. Galilée. 2005.
- Hyperrêve. Galilée. 2006.
- Si près. Galilée. 2007.
- Cigüe: vieilles femmes en fleurs. Galilée. 2008.
- Philippines: prédelles. Galilée. 2009.
- Ève s'évade: la ruine et la vie. Galilée. 2009.
- Double Oubli de l'Orang-Outang [Double Oblivion of the Ourang-Outang]. Translated by Garnier, Lucy; Dow, Suzanne. Galilée. 2010.
- Ruines bien rangées published by Éditions Gallimard, 2020
- Rêvoir. Gallimard. 2021. ISBN 978-2-072-95233-3.

==== Theatre ====
- La Pupulle, Cahiers Renaud-Barrault, Gallimard, 1971.
- Portrait de Dora, Des femmes, 1976.
- Le Nom d'Oedipe. Chant du corps interdit, Des femmes, 1978.
- La Prise de l'école de Madhubaï, Avant-scène du Théâtre, 1984.
- L'Histoire terrible mais inachevée de Norodom Sihanouk, roi du Cambodge, Théâtre du Soleil, 1985.
- Théâtre, Des femmes, 1986.
- L'Indiade, ou l'Inde de leurs rêves, Théâtre du Soleil, 1987.
- On ne part pas, on ne revient pas, Des femmes, 1991.
- Les Euménides d'Eschyle (traduction), Théâtre du Soleil, 1992.
- L'Histoire (qu'on ne connaîtra jamais), Des femmes, 1994.
- "Voile Noire Voile Blanche / Black Sail White Sail", bilingual, trad. Catherine A.F. MacGillivray, New Literary History 25, 2 (Spring), Minnesota University Press, 1994.
- La Ville parjure ou le Réveil des Érinyes, Théâtre du Soleil, 1994.
- Jokasta, libretto to the opera of Ruth Schönthal, 1997.
- Tambours sur la digue, Théâtre du Soleil, 1999.
- Rouen, la Trentième Nuit de Mai '31, Galilée, 2001.
- Le Dernier Caravansérail, Théâtre du Soleil, 2003.
- Les Naufragés du Fol Espoir, Théâtre du Soleil, 2010.

==== Selected essays ====
- L'Exil de James Joyce ou l'Art du remplacement (doctoral thesis), Grasset, 1969.
- Prénoms de personne, Le Seuil, 1974.
- The Exile of James Joyce or the Art of Replacement (translation by Sally Purcell of L'exil de James Joyce ou l'Art du remplacement). New York: David Lewis, 1980.
- Un K. Incompréhensible : Pierre Goldman, Christian Bourgois, 1975.
- La Jeune Née, with Catherine Clément, 10/18, 1975.
- La Venue à l'écriture, with Madeleine Gagnon and Annie Leclerc, 10/18, 1977.
- Entre l'écriture, Des femmes, 1986.
- L'Heure de Clarice Lispector, Des femmes, 1989.
- Photos de racines, with Mireille Calle-Gruber, Des femmes, 1994.
- Lettre à Zohra Drif, 1998
- Portrait de Jacques Derrida en Jeune Saint Juif, Galilée, 2001.
- Rencontre terrestre, with Frédéric-Yves Jeannet, Galilée, 2005.
- Le Tablier de Simon Hantaï, 2005.
- Insister. À Jacques Derrida, Galilée, 2006.
- Le Voisin de zéro : Sam Beckett, Galilée, 2007
- Défions l'augure (on the quote 'we defy augury' from Hamlet), Galilée, 2018

== See also ==
- Antinarcissism
- List of deconstructionists
- Jean-Louis de Rambures, "Comment travaillent les écrivains", Paris 1978 (interview with H. Cixous)
- Phallic monism
