= Écriture féminine =

Feminist writing style

Écriture féminine ('women's writing') was coined by French feminist and literary theorist Hélène Cixous in her 1975 essay "The Laugh of the Medusa". Cixous aimed to establish a genre of literary writing that deviates from traditional masculine styles of writing, one which examines the relationship between the cultural and psychological inscription of the female body and female difference in language and text. This strand of feminist literary theory originated in France in the early 1970s through the works of Cixous and other theorists including Luce Irigaray, Chantal Chawaf, Catherine Clément and Julia Kristeva, and has subsequently been expanded upon by writers such as psychoanalytic theorist Bracha Ettinger, who emerged in this field in the early 1990s.

Écriture féminine as a theory foregrounds the importance of language for the psychic understanding of self. Cixous is searching for what Isidore Isou refers to as the "hidden signifer" in language which expresses the ineffable and what cannot be expressed in structuralist language. It has been suggested by Cixous herself that more free and flowing styles of writing such as stream of consciousness, have a more "feminine" structure and tone than that of more traditional modes of writing. This theory draws on ground theory work in psychoanalysis about the way that humans come to understand their social roles. In doing so, it goes on to expound how women, who may be positioned as 'other' in a masculine symbolic order, can reaffirm their understanding of the world through engaging with their own otherness, both within and outside their own minds, or consciousness.

== Cixous ==
Hélène Cixous first coined écriture féminine in her essay "The Laugh of the Medusa" (1975), where she asserts "woman must write her self: must write about women and bring women to writing, from which they have been driven away as violently as from their bodies" because their sexual pleasure has been repressed and denied expression. Inspired by Cixous' essay, a recent book titled Laughing with Medusa (2006) analyzes the collective work of Julia Kristeva, Luce Irigaray, Bracha Ettinger and Hélène Cixous. These writers are as a whole referred to by Anglophones as "the French feminists," though Mary Klages, Associate Professor in the English Department at the University of Colorado at Boulder, has pointed out that "poststructuralist theoretical feminists" would be a more accurate term. Madeleine Gagnon is a more recent proponent. And since the aforementioned 1975 when Cixous also founded women's studies at Vincennes, she has been as a spokeswoman for the group Psychanalyse et politique and a prolific writer of texts for their publishing house, des femmes. And when asked of her own writing she says, "Je suis là où ça parle" ("I am there where it/id/the female unconscious speaks.")

American feminist critic and writer Elaine Showalter defines this movement as "the inscription of the feminine body and female difference in language and text." Écriture féminine places experience before language, and privileges non-linear, cyclical writing that evades "the discourse that regulates the phallocentric system." Because language is not a neutral medium, it can be said to function as an instrument of patriarchal expression. As Peter Barry writes, "the female writer is seen as suffering the handicap of having to use a medium (prose writing) which is essentially a male instrument fashioned for male purposes". Ecriture féminine thus exists as an antithesis of masculine writing or as a means of escape for women.

In the words of Rosemarie Tong, "Cixous challenged women to write themselves out of the world men constructed for women. She urged women to put themselves-the unthinkable/unthought-into words."

Almost everything is yet to be written by women about femininity: about their sexuality, that is, its infinite and mobile complexity; about their eroticization, sudden turn-ons of a certain minuscule-immense area of their bodies; not about destiny, but about the adventure of such and such a drive, about trips, crossings, trudges, abrupt and gradual awakenings, discoveries of a zone at once timorous and soon to be forthright.

With regard to phallogocentric writing, Tong argues that "male sexuality, which centers on what Cixous called the "big dick", is ultimately boring in its pointedness and singularity. Like male sexuality, masculine writing, which Cixous usually termed phallogocentric writing, is also ultimately boring" and furthermore, that "stamped with the official seal of social approval, masculine writing is too weighted down to move or change".

Write, let no one hold you back, let nothing stop you: not man; not the imbecilic capitalist machinery, in which the publishing houses are the crafty, obsequious relayers of imperatives handed down by an economy that works against us and off our backs; not yourself. Smug-faced readers, managing editors, and big bosses don't like the true texts of women- female-sexed texts. That kind scares them.

For Cixous, écriture féminine is not only a possibility for female writers; rather, she believes it can be (and has been) employed by male authors such as James Joyce or Jean Genet. Some have found this idea difficult to reconcile with Cixous' definition of écriture féminine (often termed 'white ink') because of the many references she makes to the female body ("There is always in her at least a little of that good mother's milk. She writes in white ink".) when characterizing the essence of écriture féminine and explaining its origin. This notion raises problems for some theorists:

"Ecriture féminine, then, is by its nature transgressive, rule-transcending, intoxicated, but it is clear that the notion as put forward by Cixous raises many problems. The realm of the body, for instance, is seen as somehow immune to social and gender condition and able to issue forth a pure essence of the feminine. Such essentialism is difficult to square with feminism which emphasizes femininity as a social construction..."

== Irigaray and Kristeva ==
For Luce Irigaray, women's sexual pleasure jouissance cannot be expressed by the dominant, ordered, "logical," masculine language because, according to Kristeva, feminine language is derived from the pre-oedipal period of fusion between mother and child which she termed the semiotic. Associated with the maternal, feminine language (which Irigaray called parler femme, womanspeak) is not only a threat to culture, which is patriarchal, but also a medium through which women may be creative in new ways. Irigaray expressed this connection between women's sexuality and women's language through the following analogy: women's jouissance is more multiple than men's unitary, phallic pleasure because

"woman has sex organs just about everywhere...feminine language is more diffusive than its 'masculine counterpart'. That is undoubtedly the reason...her language...goes off in all directions and...he is unable to discern the coherence."

Irigaray and Cixous also go on to emphasize that women, historically limited to being sexual objects for men (virgins or prostitutes, wives or mothers), have been prevented from expressing their sexuality in itself or for themselves. If they can do this, and if they can speak about it in the new languages it calls for, they will establish a point of view (a site of difference) from which phallogocentric concepts and controls can be seen through and taken apart, not only in theory, but also in practice.

== Ettinger ==
Bracha L. Ettinger invented a field of notions and concepts to address and become aware of affects, feeling and trans-subjective connectivity that originates in the subject and humanizes her and him, according to Ettinger, via the feminine sexuality, pre-maternal experiences and maternal potentiality. Ettinger's language, developed slowly from 1985 and until now in poetic writing in artist's books and in academic writing, includes her original concepts like: matrixial time-space, matrixial space, metramorphosis, com-passion, coemergence, cofading, copoiesis, wit(h)nessing, fascinance, carriance, psychic pregnance, distance-in-proximity, borderlnking, borderspacing, proximity-in-distance, matrixial feminine/prenatal Encounter-event and ethical seduction-into-life. Many writers in the fields of film theory, psychoanalysis, ethics, aesthetics, Literature studies, Contemporary art and Art History are using the Ettingerian matrixial sphere (matricial sphere) in their analysis of contemporary and historical material.

== Critiques ==
The approach through language to feminist action has been criticised by some as over-theoretical: they would see the fact that the very first meeting of a handful of would-be feminist activists in 1970 only managed to launch an acrimonious theoretical debate as marking the situation as typically 'French' in its apparent insistence on the primacy of theory over politics. Nonetheless, in practice the French women's movement developed in much the same way as the feminist movements elsewhere in Europe or in the United States: French women participated in consciousness-raising groups; demonstrated in the streets on the 8 March; fought hard for women's right to choose whether to have children; raised the issue of violence against women; and struggled to change public opinion on issues concerning women and women's rights.

Further criticisms of écriture féminine include what some claim is an essentialist view of the body and the consequential reliance on a feminism of 'difference' which, according to Diana Holmes, for instance, tends to "demonize masculinity as the repository of all that (at least from a post-'68, broadly Left perspective) is negative." It also, says Holmes in French Women's Writings, 1848-1994 (1996), would exclude much of women's writing from the feminist canon. Monique Wittig and other French materialist feminists have been particularly opposed to any celebration of féminité.

== Variations ==
In Quebec and Canada, "écriture féminine" was reconceived as "écriture au féminin" or "writing in the feminine," which is to say, the act of women writing, the subjective, literary and material dimensions of women doing so. Both practices were theorized and explored by critics and writers such as Louky Bersianik, Nicole Brossard, Louise Cotnoir, Louise Dupré, Gail Scott, France Théoret, Barbara Godard, Kathy Mezei, and Daphne Marlatt in journals such as Tessera and Spirale, as well as in individual creative and critical works.

== Literary examples ==
As a result of the difficulties inherent in the notion of "écriture féminine", very few books of literary criticism have run the risk of using it as a critical tool. Jeanette Winterson's novel, Written on the Body has been read as both shaped by and diverging sharply from the project of Cixous' "Laugh of the Medusa." A. S. Byatt offers: "There is a marine and salty female wave-water to be...read as a symbol of female language, which is partly suppressed, partly self-communing, dumb before the intruding male and not able to speak out...thus mirroring those female secretions which are not inscribed in our daily use of language (langue, tongue)".

== See also ==
- Assia Djebar
- Gynocriticism
- Postmodern feminism
