= The Laugh of the Medusa =

1975 essay by Hélène Cixous

- 2010 edition
- Author: Helene Cixous
- Original title: Le Rire de la Méduse
- Language: French
- Subjects: Feminist theory, women's rights
- Published: 1975
- Publication place: France
- Media type: Print

"The Laugh of the Medusa" is a 1975 essay by French feminist critic Hélène Cixous. Originally written in French as "Le Rire de la Méduse", a revised version was translated into English by Paula Cohen and Keith Cohen in 1976.

== Overview ==
In the essay, Cixous issues an ultimatum: that women can either read and choose to stay trapped in their own bodies by a language that does not allow them to express themselves, or they can use the body as a way to communicate. She describes a writing style, écriture féminine, that she says attempts to move outside of the conventional rules found in patriarchal systems. She argues that écriture feminine allows women to address their needs by building strong self-narratives and identity. This text is situated in a history of feminist conversations that separated women because of their gender especially in terms of authorship. The "Laugh of the Medusa" addresses this rhetoric, writing on individuality and commanding women to use writing and the body as sources of power and inspiration.

Cixous uses the term the "Logic of Antilove" to describe her understanding of the systematic oppression of women by patriarchal figures. She defines the Logic of Antilove as the self-hatred women have noting that, "they have made for women an antinarcissism! A narcissism which loves itself only to be loved by what women haven't got." This idea persecutes women by defining them by what misogynistic tradition believes makes the female sex inferior. Cixous commands women to focus on individuality, particularly the individuality of the body and to write to redefine self-identity in the context of her history and narrative. The essay argues that writing is a tool women must use to advocate for themselves to acquire the freedom women have historically been denied.

However, Cixous demonstrates that écriture féminine is not limited to "woman". She names Colette, Marguerite Duras, and Jean Genet as "the only inscriptions of femininity that [she has] ever seen" in twentieth century French literature. She also criticises the women writers of the nineteenth century for writing to appeal to men. For Cixous, it is not anatomy that should define our identity; this is 'to confuse the biological and the cultural'.

"The Laugh of the Medusa" is an exhortation and call for a "feminine mode" of writing which Cixous calls "white ink" and écriture féminine. Cixous builds the text using the elements of this mode and fills it with literary allusions. She instructs women to use writing as a means of authority. Cixous explores how the female body is closely connected to female authorship. She conveys this message by employing a conversational dialogue in which she instructs her audience directly. She urges her audience to write, using many direct conversational statements such as "Writing is for you, you are for you; your body is yours, take it." Cixous' repetition in her message that women must write for themselves and claim their bodies bridges the gap between the physicality of the female body and their authorship. In doing so she challenges the distinctions between theory and practice expanding on the feminist rhetorical tradition. "The Laugh of the Medusa" is successful in its creation of a writing style that allows women to claim authority because it was created on the foundation of the woman's claim to herself and her body, therefore eliminating the oppressive effects of patriarchal control of rhetoric. This text is also a critique of logocentrism and phallogocentrism, because it de-prioritizes the masculine form of reason traditionally associated with rhetoric, having much in common with Jacques Derrida's earlier thought.

== Inspiration for ==
Inspired by Cixous' essay, a recent book titled Laughing with Medusa (2006) analyzes the collective work of Julia Kristeva, Luce Irigaray, Bracha Ettinger and Hélène Cixous.
