= Sally Purcell =

British poet and translator

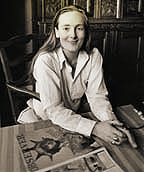
- Sally Purcell
- Born: 1 December 1944; Aston Fields, Worcestershire, England
- Died: 4 January 1998 (aged 53); Oxford
- Occupations: Poet, writer, researcher, translator

Sally Purcell (1 December 1944 – 4 January 1998) was a British poet and translator. She produced several English translations of poetry and literary works, including the first English translation of Hélène Cixous's The Exile of James Joyce or the Art of Replacement, and published at least six volumes of her own poetry.

== Biography ==
Born in Aston Fields, Worcestershire in 1944, Purcell attended Bromsgrove High School and became the first pupil of the school to win an open scholarship to Oxford University, where she studied Mediaeval and Modern French at Lady Margaret Hall. After graduation she remained in Oxford, working as a typist, barmaid, researcher and writer until her death, at age 53, from a rare lymphoma of the brain.

Her contemporaries remarked on Purcell's old-fashioned style of diction, which never used contractions. She told a reviewer for Isis magazine, "I know that my English is 200 years out of date, but I think that I speak it more pleasantly than most."

In 1971 Purcell co-edited (with Libby Purves, then an undergraduate student) The Happy Unicorns, a volume of work by poets under 25 years old. She published a number of translations and several selected editions of poetry, including Monarchs and the Muse (Carcanet, 1972), editions of George Peele and Charles d'Orléans (also for Carcanet), and a selection of Provençal Poems. With William Leaf she published Heraldic Symbols (1986) for the Victoria and Albert Museum.

Her own poetry was regarded by some of her contemporaries at least as of outstanding importance, precisely because it stood apart from the realism of the late twentieth century. There was a strange blend of influences from folklore, the Classics and modern French. There is a surreal Arthurian streak to much of Purcell's work, which may owe something of its beginning to another Oxford poet with a scholarly background, Charles Williams (British writer), though she always retains a strong individuality. The style was notably more lyrical and sonorous than many of her contemporaries, though it used an increasingly spare free verse, which was well described in a review of her last volume Fossil Unicorn (by Douglas Clark in Lynx): "Sally Purcell writes brilliant snowflakes of poems. Her sharp crystal language is perfect for the short gasp of her work." Her books appeared from the early seventies till her death in 1998, in several cases from Peter Jay's Anvil Press. Her main volumes are The Holly Queen (1971), Dark of Day (1977), Lake and Labyrinth (Taxvs, 1985) and "Fossil Unicorn" (1997). Her Collected Poems, edited by Peter Jay with a foreword by Marina Warner appeared posthumously in 2002 from Anvil Press.

== Bibliography ==
Poetry

- The Holly Queen, London: Anvil Press Poetry, 1971 (edited by Peter Jay; preface by Marina Warner) ISBN 9780900977817, OCLC 12889401
- Dark of Day, London: Anvil Press Poetry, 1977. ISBN 9780856460296, OCLC 4193074
- By The Clear Fountain, Bath: Mammon Press, 1980. OCLC 7621933
- Guenever and the Looking Glass, London: Greville Press, 1984
- Lake and Labyrinth, London: Taxvs, 1985. ISBN 9781850190196, OCLC 13360366
- Fossil Unicorn. London: Anvil Press Poetry, 1997. ISBN 9780856462825, OCLC 38240654
- Collected Poems. London: Anvil Press Poetry, 2002. ISBN 9780856463389, OCLC 248238868

Poetry translations

- Provençal Poems, Oxford: Carcanet Press, 1969. ISBN 9780902145023, OCLC 198738
- Amorgos, by Nikos Gatsos, translated from the Greek by Sally Purcell. London: Anvil Press Poetry, 2000

Literary translations

- The Early Italian Poets, translated from the Italian by Dante Gabriel Rossetti, edited by Sally Purcell. University of California Press, 1982, reprinted 2022. ISBN 9780520347236
- The Exile of James Joyce or the Art of Replacement, Translation of L'exil de Joyce ou l'art du remplacement by Hélène Cixous. Translated from the French by Sally Purcell. New York: David Lewis, 1980.
