= Audit study =

Method for studying discrimination

A type of study used in economics, sociology, political science, and psychology, an audit study is one in which trained employees of the researcher ("auditors") are matched on all characteristics except the one being tested for discrimination. These auditors then apply for a service, be it a job, financial advice regarding their stock portfolio, housing, or a credit card, to test for discrimination.

== Applications ==
Audit studies have been conducted to test the existence of discrimination in numerous occupations and services and in regards to multiple characteristics. For example, studies have been conducted to measure discrimination against racial minorities by real estate agents, racial discrimination in professional networking on LinkedIn and Twitter, requests on Airbnb, prices in online markets, emails to early childcare facilities as well as gender discrimination against women applying for restaurant jobs. Most employment-related audit studies have focused on overqualified college students applying for low-paying jobs during the summer. They have also been used to measure racial and gender discrimination in academia, racial discrimination in the low and high ends of the labor market, discrimination in social integration, and racial/ethnic discrimination in roommate selection. Beyond such demographic characteristics, audit studies have also examined career-history signals: callback rates decline with the length of an applicant's unemployment spell, and self-employed applicants tend to receive fewer callbacks than comparable wage earners, particularly in lower-skilled roles.

== Criticism ==
Audit studies have been criticized because the auditors may look different to employers, and this may result in the appearance of discrimination when employers were really just making decisions based on appearance. The other limitations of these studies, according to their critics, include that they are unable to audit jobs found through interactions with other people directly, only those found through newspapers. Additionally, others have noted the lack of standardization of signals (primarily names) to indicate race through correspondence (e.g., resumes and emails). Aside from being a noisy signal, since not everybody may understand what, e.g., a "Black" name is, names have also been criticized for signalling additional information. For instance, in the USA, stereotypically Black names are associated with lower socioeconomic background within the Black community. However, some recent studies have used AI-generated images, pictures of hands, or pictures of actors to signal race.

Other criticisms concern the ethics of running such experiments. Specifically, it has been pointed out that audit studies do typically not obtain informed consent of participants. Simultaneously, they generate some though usually low costs to participants and rarely provide benefits. Because of this, the literature has developed multiple guidlines to judge the ethics of an audit study on discrimination specifically. This includes judging (1) the potential harm to participants, (2) against the benefits of having a reliable measure of discrimination, (3) and taking into account whether there are other, less harmful ways to measure discrimination in the same setting. Finally, (4) deception should not strongly violate the norms of the setting the experiment is conducted in.

== See also ==
- Academic bias
- Equal opportunity
- Gender discrimination in the medical professions
- Gender pay gap
- Sexism in academia
- Sociology of race and ethnic relations
- Vignette (psychology)
