= Catherine Clément =

French writer and philosopher

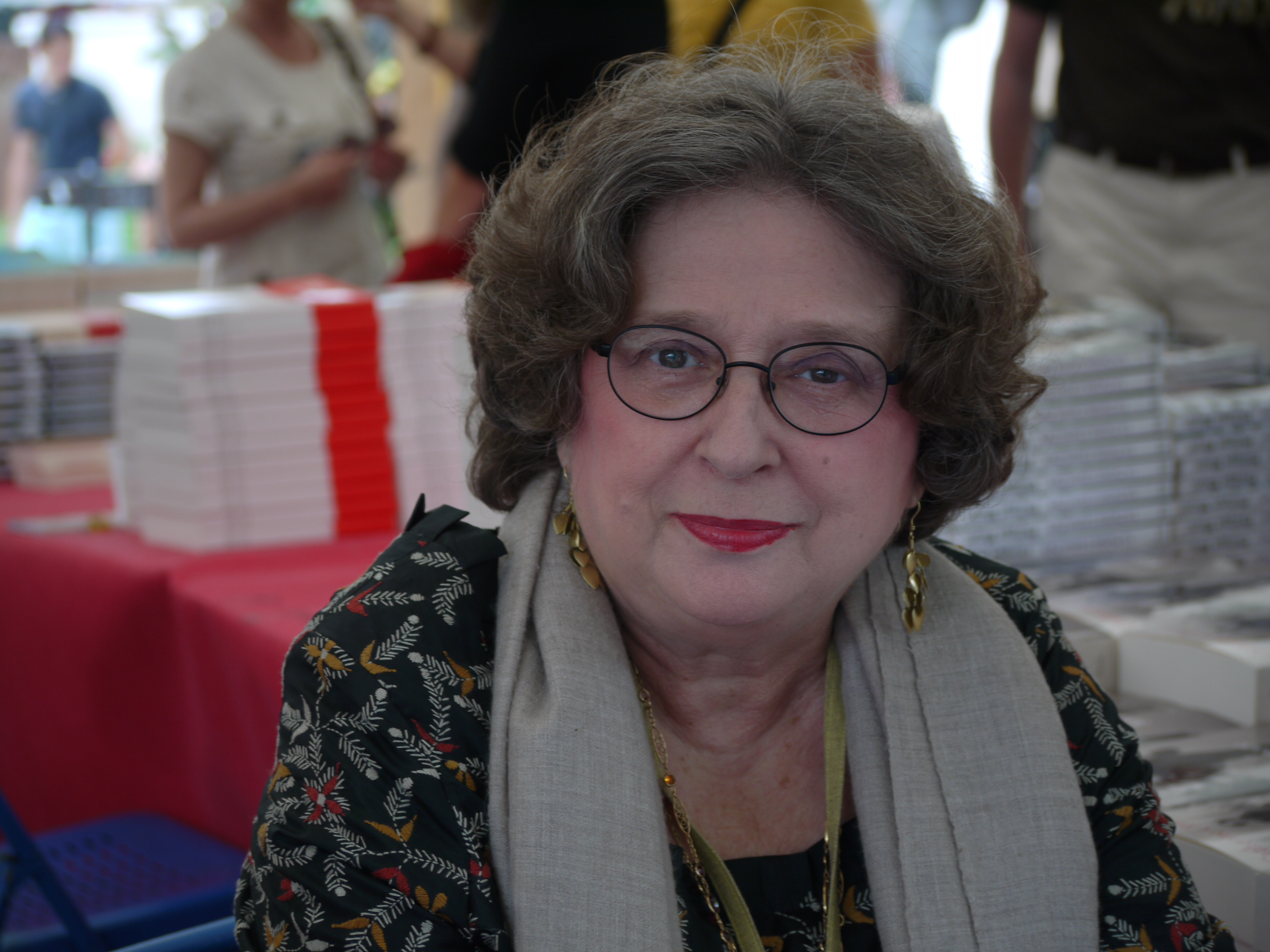
- Clément in 2009
- Born: 10 February 1939 (age 87); Boulogne-Billancourt, France
- Education: École Normale Supérieure
- Occupations: Novelist; philosopher; feminist; literary critic
- Writing career
- Language: French
- Notable awards: Ordre national du Mérite 2012 Grand Officer; Legion of Honour 2017 Commander
- Movements: French feminism; Écriture féminine

Catherine Clément (French: [klemɑ̃]; born 10 February 1939) is a French philosopher, novelist, feminist, and literary critic, born to a Jewish mother in Boulogne-Billancourt. She received a degree in philosophy from the École Normale Supérieure, and studied under its faculty Claude Lévi-Strauss and Jacques Lacan, working in the fields of anthropology and psychoanalysis. A member of the school of French feminism and écriture féminine, she has published books with Hélène Cixous and Julia Kristeva. She has also made contributions to musicology; her Opera, or the Undoing of Women (1979) is notable for its emphasis on the representation of women in opera.

She lived many years overseas, as her husband, André Lewin (1934–2012), was a diplomat who was France's Ambassador to India, Austria, Guinea, Gambia and Senegal. She was awarded the Grand Officer of the Ordre national du Mérite in 2012 and the Commander of the Legion of Honour in 2017.

== Bibliography ==
=== Novels ===
- Bildoungue ou la vie de Freud, Christian Bourgois, 1978
- La Sultane, Grasset, 1981
- Le Maure de Venise, Grasset, 1983
- Bleu Panique, Grasset, 1986
- Adrienne Lecouvreur ou le cœur transporté, Robert Laffont, 1991, (reissue: J'ai lu n°3957)
- La Señora, Calmann-Lévy (reissue: LGF-Livre de Poche n°8717)
- Pour l'amour de l'Inde, Flammarion, J'ai Lu, 1993
- La valse inachevée, Calmann-Lévy, 1994 (reissue: Le Livre de Poche n°13942)
- La Putain du diable, Flammarion, 1996 (reissue: J'ai Lu n°4839)
- Le Roman du Taj Mahal, Noésis, 1997
- Les Dames de l'agave, Flammarion, 1998
- Le Voyage de Théo, Seuil, 1998 (Points Seuil n°P680)
- Martin et Hannah, Calmann-Lévy, 1999 (reissue: Le Livre de poche n°14798)
- Afrique esclave, Noésis, 1999
- Jésus au bûcher, Seuil, 2000
- Cherche-midi, Stock, 2000 (reissue: Le Livre de poche n°30048)
- Les Mille Romans de Bénarès, Noésis, 2000
- Le Sang du monde, Seuil, 2004, sequel to Voyage de Théo
- Les derniers jours de la déesse, Stock, 2006
- La Princesse mendiante, Panama, 2007 (on the life of Mirabai)
- La Reine des cipayes, Paris: Seuil, 2012, ISBN 978-2-021-02651-1 (on the life of Rani Lakshmibai)
- Les Ravissements du Grand Moghol, Seuil, 2016
- Indu Boy, Seuil, 2018

=== Essays ===
- Lévi-Strauss ou la Structure et le malheur, Seghers, 1re édition en 1970, 2e édition en 1974,

dernière édition entièrement remaniée Le Livre de poche, « Biblio essais », 1985

- Le Pouvoir des mots, Mame, « Repères sciences humaines », 1974
- Miroirs du sujet, 10/18, série « Esthétiques », 1975
- "La Jeune Née", with Hélène Cixous U.G.E., 1975
- Les fils de Freud sont fatigués, Grasset, « Figures », 1978
- L'Opéra ou la Défaite des femmes, Grasset, « Figures », 1979
- Vies et légendes de Jacques Lacan, Grasset, « Figures », 1981, et Le Livre de poche, « Biblio essais », 1983
- Rêver chacun pour l'autre essai sur la politique culturelle, Fayard, 1982
- Le Goût du miel, Grasset, « Figures », 1987
- Gandhi : Athlète de la liberté, collection « Découvertes Gallimard » (nº 50), série Histoire. Paris: Gallimard, 1989, 2^{e} édition, 1990, new edition in 2008
  - Gandhi: Father of a Nation, 'New Horizons' series. London: Thames & Hudson, 1996
  - Gandhi: The Power of Pacifism, "Abrams Discoveries" series. New York: Harry N. Abrams, 1996
- La Syncope, philosophie du ravissement, Grasset, « Figures », 1990
- La Pègre, la peste et les dieux, chroniques du Festival d'Avignon, Éditions théâtrales, 1991
- Sissi : L'impératrice anarchiste, collection « Découvertes Gallimard » (nº 148), série Histoire. Paris: Gallimard, 1992
- Sollers, la fronde, Julliard, 1995
- Les Révolutions de l'inconscient : histoire et géographie des maladies de l'âme, La Martinière, 2001
- Le Divan et le Grigri w/ Tobie Nathan, Odile Jacob, 1998
- Claude Lévi-Strauss, PUF, « Que sais-je ? », 2003
- La Nuit et l'été : rapport sur la culture à la télévision, Seuil/La Documentation française, 2003
- Pour Sigmund Freud, Mengès, 2005
- Maison mère, NIL, 2006
- Qu'est-ce qu'un peuple premier ?, Panama, « Cyclo », 2006

=== Journalism ===
- Literary critic and philosopher for Le Matin de Paris
- Member of the editorial board of the literary journal L'Arc
- Member of the editorial board of La Nouvelle Critique, a journal of Communist intellectuals
- Member of the editorial board of Opéra International
- Responsible for many issues of Magazine Littéraire
