= Graphocentrism =

Focus on written language as "best" language

Graphocentrism or scriptism is a typically unconscious interpretative bias in which writing is privileged over speech.

Biases in favor of the written or printed word are closely associated with the ranking of sight above sound, the eye above the ear, which has been called 'ocularcentrism'. It opposes phonocentrism, which is the bias in favor of speech.

== See also ==
- Harold A. Innis, Empire and Communications
