= Judith Van Herik =

American academic

- Born: August 18, 1947; Rochester, Minnesota, U.S.
- Education: Bachelor's in Arts at University of Chicago in 1968 Master of Arts in Teaching at University of Chicago in 1971 Master of Arts in Divinity at University of Chicago in 1973 Doctor of Philosophy in Divinity at University of Chicago in 1978
- Occupation: Professor at Pennsylvania State University
- Notable work: Freud on Femininity and Faith

Judith Van Herik (born August 18, 1947) is an academic who studied Psychology and Religion. Van Herik worked at Pennsylvania State University for 24 years, from September 1977 to her retirement in June of 2001, and is most well-known for her publication Freud on Femininity and Faith.

== Early life and education ==
Judith Van Herik was born in Rochester, Minnesota, on August 18, 1947, to Martin and Jeanette Van Herik.

She received her Bachelor's in Arts from the University of Chicago in 1968, then remained at the University of Chicago for her Master of Arts in Teaching in 1971, her Master of Arts in Divinity in 1973, and her Doctor of Philosophy in Divinity in 1978. Her dissertation was entitled "Religion as Renunciation and Fulfillment: Freud's Theories of Religion and Gender"

== Career ==
After her work at the University of Chicago, Van Herik went on to work at Pennsylvania State University as an instructor from 1977 to 1978. She became an assistant professor in 1978 and became an associate professor in 1985. Van Herik retired from Pennsylvania State in 2001 and received emeritus rank for her work in religious studies and Jewish studies.

While at Pennsylvania State University, Van Herik worked on the intersection of psychology and religion, especially exploring Sigmund Freud in relation to the female experience. From 1989 to 1990, Van Herik worked with Harvard Divinity School as a Women's Studies in Religion Program Associate on a project called "The Influence of 'Fluss' (Flux): The Reflection of Women's Body-Experience in Freud's Early Work."

== Publication ==
In 1982, Van Herik published her first edition of Freud on Femininity and Faith through University of California, Berkeley Press. In 1985, it was reissued with soft covers. This publication worked to connect two different aspects of Freud's work - his conversation on gender and the Oedipus complex combined with his analyses of religion. Van Herik claims that Freud's concepts of gender are indivisible from his analysis of organized religion. She argues that gender differences evolved from the emphasis on patriarchal authority, but also that Freud's own analysis of gender criticizes femininity far more than masculinity, creating an asymmetrical analysis. Van Herik also discusses Freud's work on the topic of wish fulfillment, where he paired inferiority and femininity with weak wish fulfillment and Christianity. Freud also associated a rejection of wish fulfillment and illusion with masculinity and Judaism. Masculinity is associated with the "scientific attitude" and renunciation, or a rejection of pursuing material comforts and goods in order to achieve spiritual enlightenment.

== See also ==
- Feminist Views on the Oedipus Complex
- Feminist theology
- Psychology of Religion
- Jewish Studies
