= Frédéric Regard =

French academic

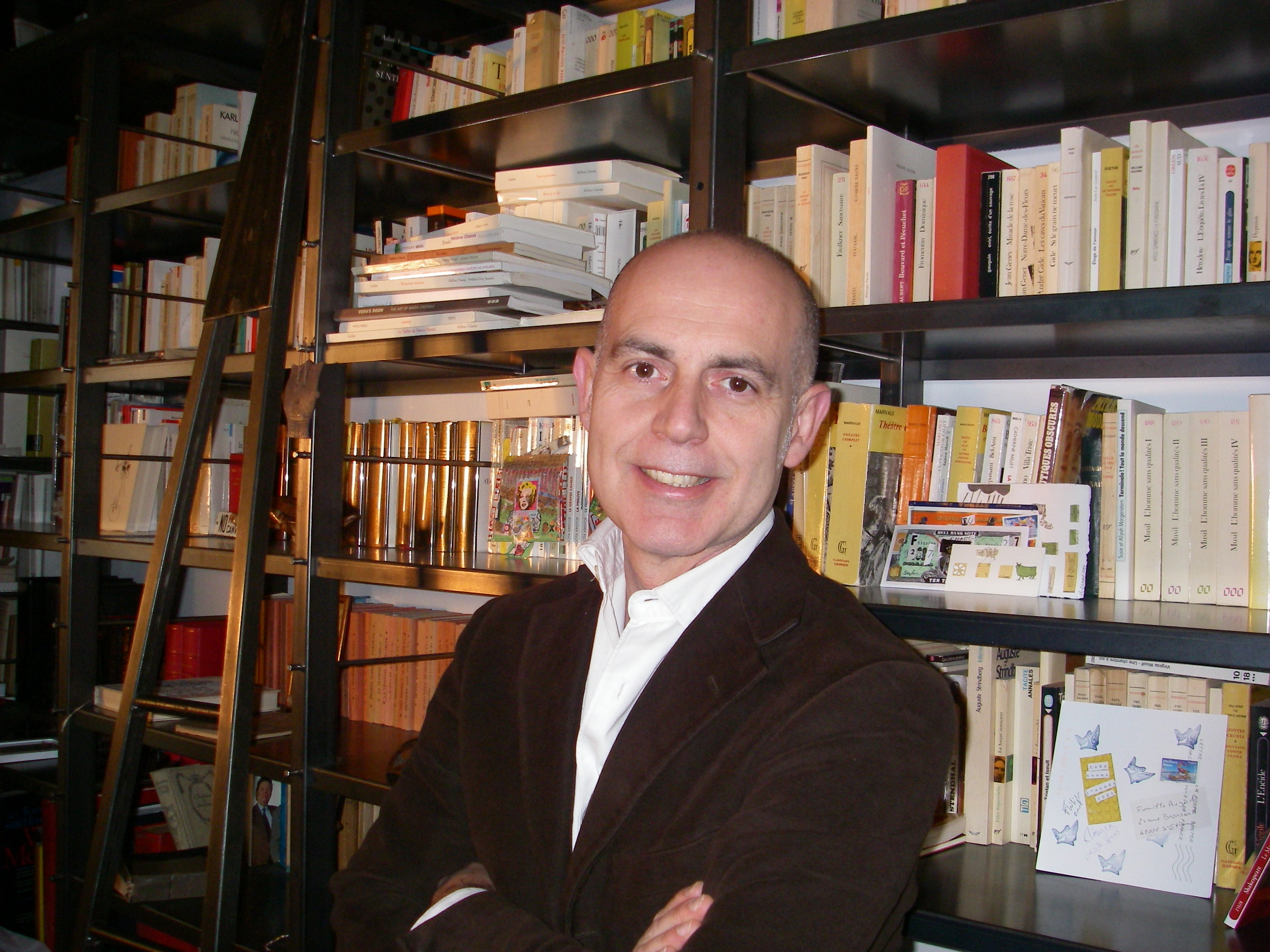
Frédéric Regard

Frédéric Regard (born 1959) is a French literary theorist who is professor of English Literature at Paris-Sorbonne University, where he teaches 19th-, 20th- and 21st-century literature and literary theory. He is a specialist in gender studies in France.

== Biography ==
Regard was born in 1959 in French Algeria in a family that had settled in Kabylie in the 19th century. He was schooled in Metropolitan France from the age of ten and entered the École normale supérieure de lettres et sciences humaines in 1978, where he majored in English literature. He passed the Agrégation in 1981 and then pursued a state doctorate under Hélène Cixous's supervision. His doctorate focused on the work of novelist William Golding, who won the Nobel Prize in Literature a year later. Regard's approach in this work had already developed into the analytical stance he would adopt later on in his career: the relationship between ethics and aesthetics. He defended his thesis at Paris 8 University in 1990.

== Career ==
Regard taught at the lycée Montaigne in Bordeaux and the lycée Simone Weil in Saint-Étienne, as well as at the University of Otago in Dunedin, New Zealand and Cairo University in Egypt. He became a "Professeur des Universités" (professor) at Jean Monnet University in 1991, before being appointed head of the English Department at the École normale supérieure de lettres et sciences humaines when it was inaugurated in September 2000. He was head of the Department until 2008, when he became a professor at Paris-Sorbonne University.

== Research ==
As a 20th-century-literature scholar, Regard has published many books and articles about key figures of the English novel, such as Virginia Woolf, George Orwell, or Doris Lessing among others, as well as contemporary authors (Anthony Burgess, Angela Carter, Jeanette Winterson, Salman Rushdie, Hanif Kureishi). At the beginning of the 2000s he extended his research to 19th-century prose, and more particularly to the field of life writing, including such topics as biography, autobiography or travel writing. This led him to found the SEMA research group at the French National Centre for Scientific Research. While still writing about 20th- and 21st-century English literature, he started to publish articles and books on cardinal John Henry Newman, explorers such as E. B. Tylor, Richard F. Burton, John Ross or John Franklin, female traveler Honoria Lawrence, slave Mary Prince, journalist W. T. Stead, or feminist activist Josephine Butler. His latest book attempts a genealogy of English detective fiction from a feminist perspective.

Regard is the founder and lead editor of the collection Les Fondamentaux du féminisme anglo-saxon (Fundamentals of Anglo-Saxon Feminism), published by ENS Editions. He is an associate research fellow at the and a member of the scientific board of the Institut du Genre. He has written several article about Jacques Derrida and Hélène Cixous, and wrote the preface to the new French edition of her famous essay Le Rire de la Méduse (The Laugh of the Medusa").

== List of works by Frédéric Regard ==
- 1984 de George Orwell, Paris: Gallimard, coll. « Foliothèque », 1994.
- La Biographie littéraire en Angleterre, Saint-Étienne: PUSE, 1999.
- L’Autobiographie littéraire en Angleterre, Saint-Étienne: PUSE, 2000.
- L’Écriture féminine en Angleterre. Perspectives postféministes, Paris: Presses universitaires de France, 2002.
- La Force du féminin. Sur trois essais de Virginia Woolf, Paris: La Fabrique, 2002.
- Mapping the Self: Space, Identity, Discourse in British Auto/Biography, Saint-Étienne: PUSE, 2003.
- De Drake à Chatwin. Rhétoriques de la découverte, Lyon: ENS Éditions, 2007.
- Histoire de la littérature anglaise, Paris: PUF, 2009.
- British Narratives of Exploration: Case Studies on the Self and Other, London: Pickering and Chatto, 2009.
- The Quest for the Northwest Passage: Knowledge, Nation and Empire, 1576-1806, London: Pickering and Chatto, 2012.
- Arctic Exploration in the Nineteenth Century: Discovering the Northwest Passage, London: Pickering and Chatto, 2013.
- Féminisme et prostitution dans l’Angleterre du XIXe siècle : la croisade de Josephine Butler, Lyon: ENS Éditions, 2014.
- Le Détective était une femme. Le polar en son genre, Paris: Presses Universitaires de France, 2018.
