= Opera, or the Undoing of Women =

1979 book by Catherine Clément

- Author: Catherine Clément
- Language: French
- Subject: Opera
- Published: 1979
- Publication place: France
- Media type: Print

Opera, or the Undoing of Women (French: L’Opéra ou la Défaite des femmes) is a 1979 book by French philosopher Catherine Clément, in which the author explores the way in which traditional operatic plots often feature the death of female characters – in her words, "the infinitely repetitive spectacle of a woman who dies, murdered." Besides the literal deaths of characters such as Carmen, Cio-Cio-San, Isolde and Mélisande, Clément also discusses metaphorical deaths – for example, Turandot's power and the Marschallin's sexuality. Clément makes many references to works outside the field of traditional musicological and opera scholarship, including Jules Michelet's La Sorcière and Claude Lévi-Strauss's Mythologiques.

The English translation, published 1988, is by Betsy Wing, with a foreword by Susan McClary.

== Operas discussed ==
- Aida
- La Bohème
- Carmen
- Les Contes d'Hoffmann
- Don Carlos
- Don Giovanni
- Elektra
- Eugene Onegin
- Falstaff
- Lucia di Lammermoor
- Madama Butterfly
- Die Meistersinger von Nürnberg
- Norma
- Otello
- Parsifal
- Pelléas et Mélisande
- I Puritani
- Der Ring des Nibelungen
- Der Rosenkavalier
- La Sonnambula
- Tosca
- La Traviata
- Tristan und Isolde
- Turandot
- Die Zauberflöte

== Reception ==
Paul Robinson reviewed the English translation in The New York Times in 1989, describing Clément's interpretation of opera as "highly original" and capable of making readers reconsider familiar works, while also calling the book "sometimes perverse". Robinson argued that the book's "gravest inadequacy" was its limited attention to music, writing that Clément's critique was largely an indictment of opera librettos rather than opera as a musical form.

Some critics, including musicologist Carolyn Abbate, similarly criticized Clément's failure to discuss the music of opera in her focus on the libretto. These critics argue that although female characters die, they also hold the "authorial voice" and thus, through singing, reverse the tradition of the passive, silent woman as object. Others note that it is exactly the music that reinforces the view of Don Jose as a sweet, romantic boy, such as in his flower aria, who is brought low by the seductive Gypsy Carmen, such as in her Habanera.

Robinson concluded that Clément had overstated her case but was "onto something", and described the study as "a work of useful provocation".
