= Phonocentrism =

Belief that speech is superior to sign or written language

Phonocentrism is the belief that sounds and speech are inherently superior to, or more primary than, written language or sign language. Those who espouse phonocentric views maintain that spoken language is the primary and most fundamental method of communication whereas writing is merely a derived method of capturing speech. Many also believe that spoken language is inherently richer and more intuitive than written language.

Some writers have argued that philosophers such as Plato, Jean-Jacques Rousseau, and Ferdinand de Saussure have promoted phonocentric views. Walter Ong, who has also expressed support for the idea of phonocentrism, has argued that the culture of the United States is particularly non-phonocentric.

Some philosophers and linguists, notably including the philosopher Jacques Derrida, have used the term "phonocentrism" to criticize what they see as a disdain for written language. Derrida has argued that phonocentrism developed because the immediacy of speech has been regarded as closer to the presence of subjects than writing. He believed that the binary opposition between speech and writing is a form of logocentrism.

== Advocates of phonocentrism ==
The philosopher John Searle has argued that Plato expressed some skepticism about the value of writing relative to speech. The rhetorician and philosopher Walter Ong also believes that Plato was phonocentric. He argues that Plato had a clear preference for "orality over writing." and that Plato's belief in phonocentrism was both contrived and defended textually, and is therefore paradoxical.

Rousseau also held views that have since been characterized as phonocentric. He discussed the topic in Essay on the Origin of Languages. He believed that speech was a more natural form of communication than writing, which he viewed as a somewhat parasitic and unhealthy derivation of speech.

The linguist Leonard Bloomfield has also expressed the belief that spoken languages are the primary form of language, and that written languages should be viewed as derived from them. He argued that "writing is not language, but merely a way of recording language."

Saussure believed that speech should be treated as the primary topic of linguistics. He believed that writing was given too much attention in the field of linguistics. In Course in General Linguistics, Saussure argued that "language and writing are two distinct systems of signs." He believed that both systems influenced each other, but that writing could obscure language. He argued that writing obscures how pronunciation forms because of its influence on pronunciation. Saussure drew a distinction between phonetic languages and languages such as Chinese in which a single character represents a word. He believed that only phonetic languages cause problems for linguists.

Ong has argued that American society is particularly opposed to phonocentrism. He believes that one cause of this is the fact that written documents, such as the United States Constitution, form a key part of American national identity. He also notes that many Americans view the reality of words as defined by dictionaries rather than by vocal speech. He has stated, "We are so literate in ideology that we think writing comes naturally. We have to remind ourselves from time to time that writing is completely and irremediably artificial."

Ong believes that writing is necessary for transmitting knowledge in a technological culture. He maintains that speech should be viewed as primary because it is drawn from the unconscious while writing requires conscious attention: "Speech is structured through the entire fabric of the human person. Writing depends on consciously contrived rules." He also states that writing and speech are each privileged in specific ways, and that they depend upon each other for identification and clarity.

== Derrida ==
Derrida believed that the fields of philosophy, literature, anthropology, and linguistics had become highly phonocentric. He argued that phonocentrism was an important example of what he saw as Western philosophy's logocentrism. He maintained that phonocentrism developed due to the human desire to determine a central means of authentic self-expression. He argued that speech is no better than writing, but is assigned that role by societies that seek to find a transcendental form of expression. This form of expression is said to allow one to better express transcendental truths and to allow one to understand key metaphysical ideas. Derrida believed that phonocentric cultures associate speech with a time before meaning was corrupted by writing. He saw phonocentrism as part of the influence of Romanticism, specifically its belief in a time in which people lived in harmony and unity with nature. Derrida did not believe that there was any ideal state of unity with nature. He also argued that speech suffers from many of the same inherent flaws as writing.

Gayatri Chakravorty Spivak has characterized Derrida's opposition to phonocentrism as part of his campaign against "human egocentricity." Derrida points out that the expression of human views is often dominated by the voices of humans. He also noted that writing frees expression from the human voice and is more exterior and stable than speech. He believed that this makes it a more effective carrier of meaning. Randal Holme has argued that Derrida preferred writing because he associated it with "the construction of meaning and the creation of category."

Derrida identified the often perceived difference between the value of speaking versus writing as one of the key binary oppositions of logocentrism. He attempted to deconstruct this opposition by arguing that speech can be seen as derived from writing as easily as writing is seen as derived from speech. He wrote that societies often make determinations that unfairly casts writing as an inferior method of communication and self-expression.

Derrida insisted that the written word has its own value, and is likely not "the simple 'supplement to the spoken word.'" In Of Grammatology he uses this method of analysis to critique the views that Rousseau expressed in Essay on the Origin of Languages. Derrida argued that Rousseau's views were contradictory and often undermined his arguments.

=== Criticism ===
Searle has criticized Derrida's claims of historical opposition to phonocentrism. Searle believes that many philosophers, including Aristotle, Gottfried Leibniz, Gottlob Frege, and Bertrand Russell, have "tended to emphasize written language as the more perspicuous vehicle of logical relations." He argues that support for ordinary speech over written language only emerged in the 1950s with the advent of Ordinary language philosophy. He also contends that Derrida makes sweeping misinformed claims about the history of writing.

Geoffrey Hartman has also criticized Derrida's accounts of phonocentrism. He has argued that Derrida failed to provide an account of the historical forces that have influenced phonocentric and non-phonocentric cultures. Ong has expressed some agreement with Hartman's critique. Though he describes Derrida's view as "brilliant and to a degree serviceable," he believes that it "plays with the paradoxes of textuality alone and in historical isolation." Though Ong believes that it is impossible to separate writing from its pretext, he contends that "this does not mean that text can be reduced to orality."

== See also ==
- Graphocentrism
- Phallogocentrism

== Bibliography ==
- Derrida, Jacques (1998), Of Grammatology, Baltimore: JHU Press, p. 452, ISBN 978-0-8018-5830-7
- Evans, Joseph Claude (1991), Strategies of deconstruction: Derrida and the myth of the voice, Minneapolis: U of Minnesota Press, p. 224, ISBN 978-0-8166-1925-2
- Fasold, Ralph W. (2003), The sociolinguistics of language, Oxford: Wiley-Blackwell, p. 352, ISBN 978-0-631-13825-9
- Hogan, Patrick Colm (2000), Philosophical approaches to the study of literature, Gainesville: University Press of Florida, p. 384, ISBN 978-0-8130-1764-8
- Holme, Randal (2004), Literacy: an introduction, Edinburgh: Edinburgh University Press, p. 280, ISBN 978-0-7486-1689-3
- Ong, Walter J. (1994), "Literacy and Orality in Our Times", in Young, Richard E.; Liu, Yameng (eds.), Landmark essays on rhetorical invention in writing, vol. 8, Davis: Psychology Press, p. 272, ISBN 978-1-880393-14-7
- Ong, Walter J. (2004), Orality and literacy: the technologizing of the word, New York: Psychology Press, p. 232, ISBN 978-0-415-28129-4
- Sarup, Madan (1993), An introductory guide to post-structuralism and postmodernism, Athens: University of Georgia Press, p. 240, ISBN 978-0-8203-1531-7
- Searle, John R. (1983), "The Word Turned Upside Down", The New York Review of Books, 30 (16), New York
