= Feminist views on the Oedipus complex =

Feminist psychoanalytic response to Freud's model of gender identity

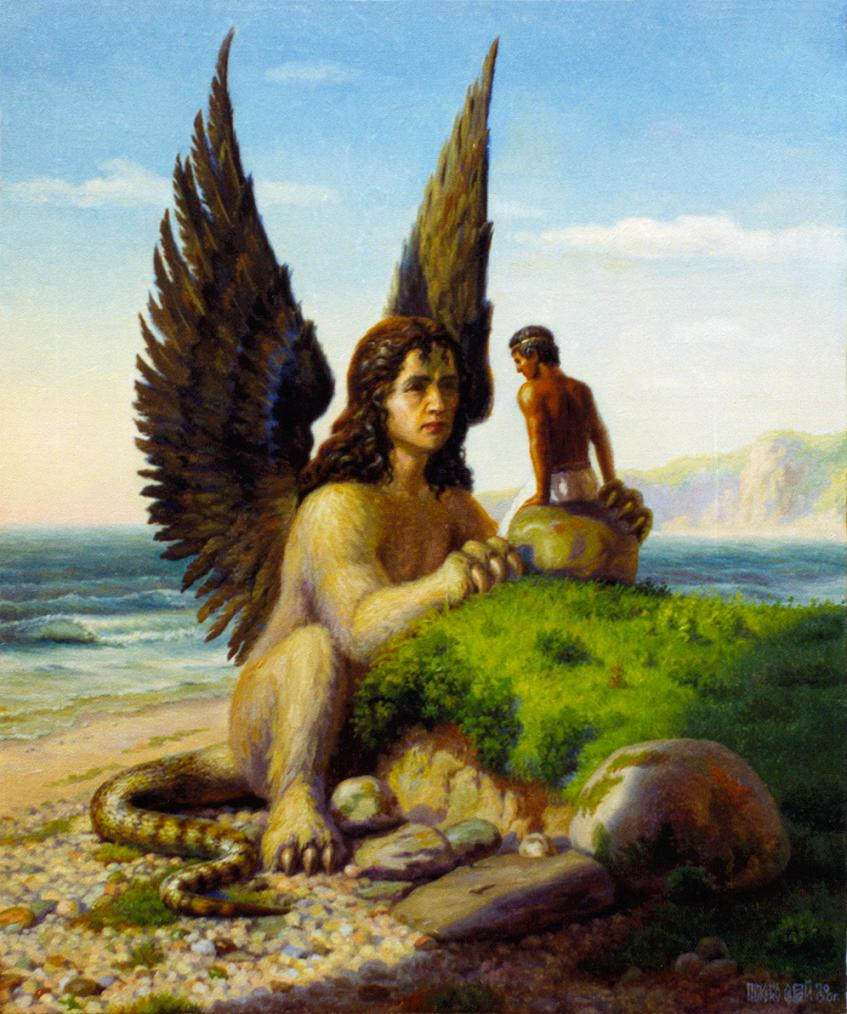
Sphinx & Oedipus

Feminists have long struggled with Sigmund Freud's classical model of gender and identity development, which centers on the Oedipus complex. Freud's model, which became integral to orthodox psychoanalysis, suggests that because women lack the visible genitals of the male, they feel they are "missing" the most central characteristic necessary for gaining narcissistic value—therefore developing feelings of gender inequality and penis envy. In his late theory on the feminine, Freud recognized the early and long lasting libidinal attachment of the daughter to the mother during the pre-oedipal stages. Feminist psychoanalysts have confronted these ideas (particularly the female relationship to the real, imaginary and symbolic phallus) and reached different conclusions. Some generally agree with Freud's major outlines, modifying it through observations of the pre-Oedipal phase. Others reformulate Freud's theories more completely.

== Hélène Deutsch ==
Hélène Deutsch (1884–1982) was one of Freud's first female pupils and the first analyst who made an integral, chronological study of woman's psychological development. In short, Deutsch claims that women have a passive-masochistic sexuality, they are born for reproduction and their development must be seen as different from the development of men.

Deutsch sees the female development as exceedingly difficult and tortuous, because at some point she must transfer her primary sexual object choice from her mother to her father (and males), if she is to attain her expected heterosexual adulthood. According to Deutsch, the girl blames her father, not her mother, for the lack of a penis; thus, she stops identifying with her father and masculinity. Because of this relationship with her father, she develops libidinous fantasies of being raped. Thus, the rape fantasy is universal and non-pathological, a key part of female sexuality. Meanwhile, the girl identifies herself with her mother through the wish for an "anal child". When she recognizes her failure, a decline to the pre-genital stage takes place: a wish for the earlier active (phallic) clitoris. Masochistic tensions in the girl prevail and she longs to be castrated by her father. The desire for a child also becomes masochistic.

== Melanie Klein ==
Melanie Klein, originator of the Kleinian school of psychoanalysis, agreed with the basic structure of the Oedipal situation, but argued that it originated at 6 months of life while subsequently continuing to be worked through during the time that Freud had previously articulated. She identified the recognition of triangular relationships as originating during this time with the start of the infant's burgeoning awareness of the mother's relationships with others.

== Nancy Chodorow ==
Nancy Chodorow noted that Freud believed that males possess physical superiority and that a woman's personality is inevitably determined by her lack of a penis. Like Freud, but for different reasons, Chodorow emphasizes that the female Oedipal crisis is not resolved completely, unlike the male crisis: a girl cannot and does not completely reject her mother in favour of men, but continues her relationship of attachment to her. The strength and quality of her relationship with her father are completely dependent upon the strength and quality of her relationship with her mother. Chodorow claims that most women are genitally heterosexual, but they have other, equally deep relationships with their children and with other women, as a result of the primary relationship with the mother. Thus, a girl represses neither her pre-Oedipal nor her Oedipal attachment to her mother nor her Oedipal attachment to her father. This means that she grows up with more ongoing preoccupation with internalized object relationships and with external relationships. Because a girl does not have to repress her pre-Oedipal and Oedipal attachment to father and mother, she reaches a more relational sensibility than boys. Chodorow illustrated this through studies suggesting that men love (and fall in love) romantically, where women love and fall in love sensibly and rationally.

== Luce Irigaray ==
In Freud's model there is no place for femininity unless it is related to masculinity. Luce Irigaray, a student of Jacques Lacan, disagrees with the thoughts about the importance of the penis and phallic for women. She hypothesizes that the reason the penis is privileged in Freud's model is that it is visible. This is also the reason that male sexuality is based, in early Lacanianism, on having (a penis) and female sexuality is based on lack. In Freud's paradigm, female desire is the desire for a baby to substitute for penis, thus female pleasure is derived from reproduction. Irigaray disagrees: "How can we accept that the entire female sexuality is being controlled by the lack and envy of the penis?" Female sexuality is not solely related to reproduction, but neither is it less valuable in reproduction, and thus it should not hold less social power. Furthermore, she says that Freud is forgetting the mother-daughter relationship. To enter the Oedipus-complex, a girl must hate her mother. Irigaray says this view makes it impossible for a girl to give meaning to the relationship with her mother.

== See also ==
- Jessica Benjamin
- Dorothy Dinnerstein
- Francoise Dolto
- Anna Freud
- Karen Horney
- Melanie Klein
- Julia Kristeva
- Jacques Lacan
- Juliet Mitchell
- Griselda Pollock
- Bracha L. Ettinger
- Joan Riviere
- Gender
- Gender inequality
- Feminist theory
- Judith Van Herik
