= Phallogocentrism =

Theory in literary analysis

In critical theory and deconstruction, phallogocentrism is a neologism coined by Jacques Derrida to refer to the privileging of the masculine (phallus) in the construction of meaning. The term is a blend word of the older terms phallocentrism (focusing on the masculine point of view) and logocentrism (focusing on language in assigning meaning to the world).

Derrida and others identified phonocentrism, or the prioritizing of speech over writing, as an integral part of phallogocentrism. Derrida explored this idea in his essay "Plato's Pharmacy".

== Background ==
In contemporary literary and philosophical works concerned with gender, the term "phallogocentrism" is commonplace largely as a result of the writings of Jacques Derrida, the founder of the philosophy of deconstruction, which is considered by many academics to constitute an essential part of the discourse of postmodernism. Deconstruction is a philosophy of "indeterminateness" and its opposing philosophy, "determinateness". According to deconstruction, indeterminate knowledge is "aporetic", i.e., based on contradictory facts or ideas ("aporias") that make it impossible to determine matters of truth with any degree of certitude; determinate knowledge, on the other hand, is "apodictic", i.e., based on facts or ideas that are considered to be "true", from one perspective or another.

The phallogocentric argument is premised on the claim that modern Western culture has been, and continues to be, both culturally and intellectually subjugated by "logocentrism" and "phallocentrism". Logocentrism is the term Derrida uses to refer to the philosophy of determinateness, while phallocentrism is the term he uses to describe the way logocentrism itself has been genderized by a "masculinist (phallic)" and "patriarchal" agenda. Hence, Derrida intentionally merges the two terms phallocentrism and logocentrism as "phallogocentrism".

The French feminist thinkers of the school of écriture féminine also share Derrida's phallogocentric reading of 'all of Western metaphysics'. For example, Cixous & Clément (1975) decry the "dual, hierarchical oppositions" set up by the traditional phallogocentric philosophy of determinateness, wherein "death is always at work" as "the premise of woman's abasement", woman who has been "colonized" by phallogocentric thinking. According to Cixous & Clément, the 'crumbling' of this way of thinking will take place through a Derridean-inspired, anti-phallo / logocentric philosophy of indeterminateness.

== Critique ==
French philosopher Catherine Malabou, part-time collaborator with Derrida himself, has taken a constructive critical approach to the idea of phallogocentrism, for example Malabou (2007). Going into dialogue with psychoanalytic masters like Sigmund Freud, Jacques Lacan and most recently Alain Badiou – to whose philosophy of the event, Malabou responds with a radical traumatology firmly rooted in the neurosciences – her take is simply that psychoanalysis is inadequate to respond to the challenges she forwards due to its phallogocentrist fixation, a dilemma she believes the neurosciences are better fit to solve. The name of her solution to this problem is plasticity.

== See also ==
- Phallic monism
