= Olivier Morel (filmmaker) =

French and American scholar, writer, and filmmaker

- Occupations: Director; filmmaker; scholar; writer

Olivier Morel is a French and American scholar, writer and filmmaker. He is the director of several feature-length nonfiction films (documentaries) and is the author of essays including one graphic novel with the artist and writer Maël. His academic work as well as his films highlight the importance of creation and the arts (music, literature, cinema, photography...) in the perception of historical events. He teaches at the department of Film, Television and Theatre at the University of Notre Dame in the United States.

== Filmography ==
- On the Bridge (L'Âme en sang, Amerikas Verletzte Seelen), 97 minutes, Zadig Productions, ARTE Grand Format, 2011.
- Germany as Told by Christoph Hein, Vladimir Kaminer, Emine Sevgi Özdamar and Bernhard Schlink, 55 minutes, Seconde Vague Productions [archive], ARTE, 2013.
- Ever, Rêve, Hélène Cixous, 118 minutes, Zadig Productions, 2018.

== Webdocumentary ==
- (in French) Profils 14-18 [archive], TV5 Monde, in collaboration with Didier Pazery and Claude Vittiglio.

== Books ==
- (in French) Visages de la Grande Guerre, Calmann-Lévy, Paris, 1998.
- (in French) Berlin Légendes ou la Mémoire des Décombres, Presses Universitaires de Vincennes, Paris, 2014.
- (in French) Revenants, drawings by Maël, Foreword by Marc Crépon, Futuropolis, Paris, 2013
  - Die Rückkehrer (German trans.), Carlsen Verlag 2014
  - Walking Wounded (English trans.), NBM Publishing, New York, 2015
- The "German Illusion" Germany and Jewish-German Motifs in Hélène Cixous's Late Work, Bloomsbury Academic Publishing, New York City, 2024.

== Exhibits ==
- Between Listening and Telling, Paris (France) City Hall, January 25-March 12, 2005, filmed testimonies of Holocaust survivors installation directed by Esther Shalev-Gerz, MK2-History (produced by Martine Saada), Mémorial de la Shoah (Paris), Paris City. The exhibit also took place in the Jeu de Paume, Paris, France, 2010; at the MCBA, Lausanne, Switzerland, 2012; at the Belkin Art Gallery, UBC, Vancouver, Canada, 2013; at La Galerie de l’UQAM, Montréal, Canada, 2014; at Wasserman Projects, Detroit, USA, 2016
- Visages de la Grande Guerre (Faces of the Great War), Douaumont Ossuary (Verdun, France), permanent exhibit inaugurated on November 11, 2008 (with Didier Pazery, photographer).
- Vestiges et Visages de la Grande Guerre (Faces and Remains of the Great War), Great East Train Station, Paris, France, June 23-November 30, 2014 (with Didier Pazery, photographer).
- Profils 14-18 (Profiles 14-18), Museum of the Great War (Musée de la Grande Guerre), Meaux, France, June 2-December 2, 2018 (with Didier Pazery, photographer).
