= Logocentrism =

Term in philosophy coined by Ludwig Klages

Logocentrism was coined by the German philosopher Ludwig Klages in the early 1900s. It refers to the tradition of Western science and philosophy that regards words and language as a fundamental expression of an external reality. It holds the logos as epistemologically superior and that there is an original, irreducible object which the logos represent. According to logocentrism, the logos is the ideal representation of the Platonic ideal.

== In linguistics ==
According to Jacques Derrida, with the logos as the site of a representational unity, linguistics dissects the structure of the logos further and establishes the sound of the word, coupled with the sense of the word, as the original and ideal location of metaphysical significance. Logocentric linguistics proposes that "the immediate and privileged unity which founds significance and the acts of language is the articulated unity of sound and sense within the phonic." As the science of language, linguistics is a science by way of this semiotic phonology. It follows, therefore, that speech is the primary form of language and that writing is secondary, representative, and, importantly, outside of speech. Writing is a "sign of a sign" and, therefore, is basically phonetic.

Jonathan Culler in his book Literary Theory: A Very Short Introduction says:

Traditionally, Western philosophy has distinguished "reality" from "appearance," things themselves from representations of them, and thought from signs that express it. Signs or representations, in this view, are but a way to get at reality, truth, or ideas, and they should be as transparent as possible; they should not get in the way, should not affect or infect the thought or truth they represent. In this framework, speech has seemed the immediate manifestation or presence of thought, while writing, which operates in the absence of the speaker, has been treated as an artificial and derivative representation of speech, a potentially misleading sign of a sign (p. 11).

This notion that the written word is a sign of a sign has a long history in Western thought. According to Aristotle (384 BC – 322 BC), "Spoken words are the symbols of mental experience and written words are the symbols of spoken words." Jean-Jacques Rousseau similarly states, "Writing is nothing but the representation of speech; it is bizarre that one gives more care to the determining of the image than to the object."

Derrida's critique of logocentrism examines the limitations of linguistic systems that prioritize speech over writing and assume a direct, stable connection between language and meaning. He argues that traditional linguistics fails to be "general" as it remains bound by rigid distinctions—between inside and outside, essence and fact—which prevent a complete understanding of language's structure.

For Derrida, writing is not merely a secondary "image" or representation of speech; rather, it challenges the very notion of a pure linguistic core. He suggests that if signs always refer to other signs, then writing is inherent within language itself, not a detached representation. This concept undermines the idea of language as a transparent tool for representing a stable reality.

Derrida identifies this bias, logocentrism, as central to Western metaphysical thought, which privileges "presence" and direct expression in speech. This bias has stifled deeper inquiry into writing's origin and role, reducing it to a mere technical tool rather than acknowledging it as fundamental to meaning-making. Consequently, logocentrism restricts linguistic theory, making it impossible to fully explore the complex, interconnected nature of language and writing.

== Saussure ==
Ferdinand de Saussure (1857–1913), it is claimed by Derrida, follows this logocentric line of thought in the development of his linguistic sign and its terminology. Where the word remains known as the whole sign, the unification of concept and sound-image becomes the unification of the signified and the signifier respectively. The signifier is then composed of an indivisible sound and image whereby the graphic form of the sign is exterior.

According to Saussure in his Course in General Linguistics, "The linguistic object is not defined by the combination of the written word and the spoken word: the spoken form alone constitutes the object." Language has, he writes, "an oral tradition that is independent of writing."

== Derrida ==
French philosopher Jacques Derrida (1930–2004) in his book Of Grammatology responds in depth to what he believes is Saussure's logocentric argument. Derrida deconstructs the apparent inner, phonological system of language, stating in Chapter 2, Linguistics and Grammatology, that in fact and for reasons of essence Saussure's representative determination is "...an ideal explicitly directing a functioning which...is never completely phonetic". The idea that writing might function other than phonetically and also as more than merely a representative delineation of speech allows an absolute concept of logos to end in what Derrida describes as infinitist metaphysics. The difference in presence can never actually be reduced, as was the logocentric project; instead, the chain of signification becomes the trace of presence-absence.

That the signified is originarily and essentially (and not only for a finite and created spirit) trace, that it is always already in the position of the signifier, is the apparently innocent proposition within which the metaphysics of the logos, of presence and consciousness, must reflect upon writing as its death and its resource.

== In literary theory ==
Inherent in Saussure's reasoning, a structuralist approach to literature began in the 1950s to assess the literary text, or utterance, in terms of its adherence to certain organising conventions which might establish its objective meaning. Again, as for Saussure, structuralism in literary theory is condemned to fail on account of its own foundation: '...language constitutes our world, it doesn't just record it or label it. Meaning is always attributed to the object or idea by the human mind, and constructed by and expressed through language: it is not already contained within the thing'.

There is no absolute truth outside of construction no matter how scientific or prolific that construction might be. Enter Derrida and post-structuralism. Other like-minded philosophers and psychoanalysts who have notably opposed logocentrism are Nietzsche, Wittgenstein, Heidegger and Freud, as well as those who have been influenced by them in this vein. Literary critic Roland Barthes (1915–1980), with his essay The Death of the Author (1968), converted from structuralism to post-structuralism.

For the post-structuralist the writer must be present in a kind of absence, or 'dead', according to Barthes; just as the reader is absent in a kind of presence at the 'moment' of the literary utterance. Post-structuralism is therefore against the moral formalism of the Western literary tradition which maintains only The Greats should be looked to for literary inspiration and indeed for a means of political control and social equilibrium.

Modernism, with its desire to regain some kind of lost presence, also resists post-structuralist thought; whereas Post-modernism accepts the loss (the loss of being as 'presence') and steps beyond the limitations of logocentrism.

== In non-Western cultures ==
Some researchers consider that logocentrism may not be something which exists across all cultures, but instead has a particular bias in Western culture. Dennis Tedlock's study of stories in the Quiché Maya culture leads him to suggest that the development of alphabetic writing systems may have led to a logocentric perspective, but this is not the case in all writing systems, and particularly less prevalent in cultures where writing has not been established. Tedlock writes, "The voice is linear, in [Derrida's] view; there is only one thing happening at a time, a sequence of phonemes," and this is reflected in writing and even the study of language in the field of linguistics and what Tedlock calls "mythologics (or larger-scale structuralism)", "are founded not upon a multidimensional apprehension of the multidimensional voice, but upon unilinear writing of the smallest-scale articulations within the voice." This one-dimensionality of writing means that only words can be represented through alphabetic writing, and, more often than not, tone, voice, accent and style are difficult if not impossible to represent. Geaney, in writing about ming (names) in early Chinese reveals that ideographic writing systems present some difficulty for the idea of logocentrism, and that even Derrida wrote of Chinese writing in an ambivalent way, assuming firstly that "writing has a historical telos in which phonetic writing is the normal 'outcome'", but also "speculat[ing] without irony about Chinese writing as a 'movement of civilization outside all logocentrism'".

== See also ==
- Metaphysics of presence
- Deconstruction
- Différance
- Phallogocentrism
- Phonocentrism
- Apollonian and Dionysian
