= Luce Irigaray =

Belgian-born French feminist, philosopher

- Born: 3 May 1930 (age 96); Blaton, Wallonia, Belgium

Education
- Education: Catholic University of Louvain; University of Paris; Institut de Psychologie de Paris; University of Paris VIII; University of Paris X
- Doctoral advisor: Jean Dubois; François Châtelet

Philosophical work
- Era: Contemporary philosophy
- Region: Western philosophy
- School: Continental philosophy Difference feminism Post-structural feminism French feminism
- Institutions: CNRS; University of Paris VIII; Erasmus University Rotterdam
- Main interests: Linguistics, psychoanalysis, feminist philosophy, gender identity, ethics
- Notable ideas: Ethics of sexual difference, criticism of phallogocentric arguments, "women on the market"

Luce Irigaray (born 3 May 1930) is a Belgian-born French feminist, philosopher, linguist, psycholinguist, psychoanalyst, and cultural theorist who examines the uses and misuses of language in relation to women. She is considered one of the founders of French difference feminism.

Irigaray's first and most well known book, published in 1974, was Speculum of the Other Woman (1974), which analyzes the texts of Freud, Hegel, Plato, Aristotle, Descartes, and Kant through the lens of phallocentrism. Irigaray is the author of works analyzing many thinkers, including This Sex Which Is Not One (1977), which discusses Lacan's work as well as political economy; Elemental Passions (1982) can be read as a response to Maurice Merleau-Ponty's article “The Intertwining—The Chiasm” in The Visible and the Invisible, and in The Forgetting of Air in Martin Heidegger (1999), Irigaray critiques Heidegger's emphasis on the element of earth as the ground of life and speech and his "oblivion" or forgetting of air.

Irigaray employs three different modes in her investigations into the nature of gender, language, and identity: the analytic, the essayistic, and the lyrical poetic. As of October 2021, she is active in the women's movements in both France and Italy.

== Education ==
Luce Irigaray received a bachelor's degree from the University of Louvain in 1954, a master's degree from the same university in 1956, and taught at a high school in Brussels from 1956 to 1959.

In 1960, she moved to Paris to pursue a master's degree in psychology from the University of Paris, which she earned in 1961. She also received a specialist diploma in psychopathology from the Institut de Psychologie de Paris in 1962. In 1968, she received a doctorate in Linguistics from the Paris Nanterre University (University of Paris X). Her thesis was titled Approche psycholinguistique du langage des déments.

She completed a PhD in linguistics in 1968 from the University of Vincennes in Saint-Denis (University of Paris VIII). Her dissertation on speech patterns of subjects suffering from dementia became her first book, Le langage des déments, published in 1973. In 1974, she earned a second PhD in Philosophy.

In the 1960s, Irigaray started attending the psychoanalytic seminars of Jacques Lacan and joined the École Freudienne de Paris (Freudian School of Paris), directed by Lacan. She was expelled from this school in 1974, after the publication of her second doctoral thesis (doctorat d'État), Speculum of the Other Woman (Speculum: La fonction de la femme dans le discours philosophique, later retitled as Speculum: De l'autre femme), which received much criticism from both the Lacanian and Freudian schools of psychoanalysis. This criticism brought her recognition, but she was removed from her position as an instructor at the University of Vincennes as well as ostracized from the Lacanian community.

She has held a research post at the CNRS since 1964, where she is now a Director of Research in Philosophy. Her initial research focused on dementia patients, about whom she produced a study of the differences between the language of male and female patients.

It has also been noted that in her writings, Irigaray has stated a concern that an interest in her biography would affect the interpretation of her ideas, as the entrance of women into intellectual discussions has often also included the challenging of women's point of view based on biographical material. Her most extensive autobiographical statements thus far are gathered in Through Vegetal Being (co-authored with Michael Marder). Overall, she maintains the belief that biographical details pertaining to her personal life hold the possibility to be used against her within the male dominated educational establishment as a tool to discredit her work. However, at age 91, she published A New Culture of Energy: Beyond East and West (2021) in which she discusses her decades-long practices of yoga asanas (postures) and pranayama (breathing) and maintains that yoga builds a bridge between body and spirit.

== Major works ==
=== Speculum of the Other Woman (Speculum de l'autre femme) ===
Her first major book, Speculum of the Other Woman, based on her second dissertation, was published in 1974. In Speculum, Irigaray engages in close analyses of phallocentrism in Western philosophy and psychoanalytic theory, analyzing texts by Freud, Hegel, Plato, Aristotle, Descartes, and Kant. The book's most cited essay, "The Blind Spot of an Old Dream," critiques Freud's lecture on femininity.

=== This Sex Which is Not One (Ce sexe qui n'en est pas un) ===
In 1977, Irigaray published This Sex Which is Not One (Ce sexe qui n'en est pas un) which was subsequently translated into English with that title and published in 1985, along with Speculum. In addition to more commentary on psychoanalysis, including discussions of Lacan's work, This Sex Which is Not One also comments on political economy, drawing on structuralist writers such as Lévi-Strauss. For example, Irigaray argues that the phallic economy places women alongside signs and currency, since all forms of exchange are conducted exclusively between men.

==== "Women on the Market" ====
In "Women on the Market" (Chapter Eight of This Sex Which is Not One), Irigaray draws upon Karl Marx's theory of capital and commodities to claim that women are exchanged between men in the same way as any other commodity is. She argues that our entire society is predicated on this exchange of women. Her exchange value is determined by society, while her use value is her natural qualities. Thus, a woman’s self is divided between her use and exchange values, and she is only desired for the exchange value. This system creates three types of women: the mother, who is all use value; the virgin, who is all exchange value; and the prostitute, who embodies both use and exchange value.

She further uses additional Marxist foundations to argue that women are in demand due to their perceived shortage and as a result, males seek "to have them all," or seek a surplus like the excess of commodity buying power, capital, that capitalists seek constantly. Irigaray speculates thus that perhaps, "the way women are used matters less than their number." In this further analogy of women "on the market," understood through Marxist terms, Irigaray points out that women, like commodities, are moved between men based on their exchange value rather than just their use value, and the desire will always be surplus – making women almost seem like capital, in this case, to be accumulated. "As commodities, women are thus two things at once: utilitarian objects and bearers of value."

=== Elemental Passions ===
Luce Irigaray's Elemental Passions (1982) could be read as a response to Merleau‐Ponty's article “The Intertwining—The Chiasm” in The Visible and the Invisible. Like Merleau‐Ponty, Irigaray describes corporeal intertwining or vision and touch. Counteracting the narcissistic strain in Merleau‐Ponty's chiasm, she assumes that sexual difference must precede the intertwining. The subject is marked by the alterity or the “more than one” and encoded as a historically contingent gendered conflict.

== Themes ==
=== Philosophy ===
Some of Irigaray's books written in her lyrical mode are imaginary dialogues with significant contributors to Western philosophy, such as Nietzsche and Heidegger. However, Irigaray also writes a significant body of work on Hegel, Descartes, Plato, Aristotle and Emmanuel Levinas, Spinoza, as well as Merleau-Ponty. Her academic work is largely influenced by a wide range of philosophers and cannot be limited to one approach.

=== Language ===
She continued to conduct empirical studies about language researching the differences between the way men and women speak. This focus on sexual difference is the key characteristic of Irigaray's oeuvre, since she is seeking to provide a site from which a feminine language can eventuate. Through her research, Irigaray discovered a correlation between the suppression of female thought in the Western world and language of men and women. She concluded that there are gendered language patterns that denote dominance in men and subjectivity in women.

=== Sexual difference ===
Building on but departing from Lacan, Irigaray asserts that the phallus has functioned as the central signifier of meaning and subjectivity, leaving no space for women to exist as autonomous subjects. To counter this, she proposes the creation of a new symbolic order that acknowledges and values genuine sexual difference, allowing women to develop their own forms of speech, desire, and representation. Her vision is not for gender neutrality but for a world in which male and female exist as two equally recognized yet distinct identities.

=== Gender identity ===
Since 1990, Irigaray's work has turned increasingly toward women and men together. In Between East and West, From Singularity to Community (1999) and in The Way of Love (2002), she imagines new forms of love for a global democratic community. In An Ethics of Sexual Difference, she introduces the idea of relationships between men and women centered around a bond other than reproduction. She acknowledges themes including finiteness and intersubjectivity, embodied divinity, and the emotional distinction between the two sexes. She concludes that Western culture is unethical due to gender discrimination.

=== Politics ===
Irigaray is active in a feminist movement in Italy, but she refused to belong to any one movement because she does not like the competitive dynamic between the feminist movements.

== Criticism ==
Some feminists criticize Irigaray's perceived essentialist positions. However, there is much debate among scholars as to whether or not her theory of sexual difference is, indeed, an essentialist one. Feminist theorists in the late 1970s and 1980s often accused Irigaray of essentialism, but that changed in the 1990s with American scholars such as Naomi Schor, Jane Gallop, and Diana Fuss arguing for a "political essentialist" reading of her work.

The perception that Irigaray's work is essentialist usually concentrates on her attention to sexual difference, taking this to constitute a rehearsal of heteronormative sexuality. For Helen Fielding, the uneasiness among feminists about Irigaray's discussion of masculinity and femininity does not so much reveal Irigaray's heteronormative bias as much as it "arises out of an inherited cultural understanding [on the part of her critics] that posits nature as either unchanging organism or as matter that can be ordered, manipulated and inscribed upon. Hence the concern over essentialism is itself grounded in the binary thinking that preserves a hierarchy of...culture over nature."

W. A. Borody has criticised Irigaray's phallogocentric argument as misrepresenting the history of philosophies of "indeterminateness" in the West. Irigaray's "black and white" claims that the masculine equates to determinateness and that the feminine equates to indeterminateness which a degree of cultural and historical validity, but not when they are deployed to self-replicate a similar form of the gender-othering they originally sought to overcome.

In Fashionable Nonsense, Alan Sokal and Jean Bricmont criticized Irigaray's use of hard-science terminology in her writings. Among the criticisms, they question the purported interest Einstein had in "accelerations without electromagnetic reequilibrations"; confusing special relativity and general relativity; and her claim that E = mc^{2} is a "sexed equation" because "it privileges the speed of light over other speeds that are vitally necessary to us". In reviewing Sokal and Bricmont's book, Richard Dawkins wrote that Irigaray's assertion that fluid mechanics was unfairly neglected in physics due to its association with "feminine" fluids (in contrast to "masculine" solids) was "daffy absurdity."

== Selected bibliography ==
=== Books ===
- Irigaray, Luce (1974). Speculum of the Other Woman. (Eng. trans. 1985 by Gillian C. Gill), ISBN 9780801493300.
- Irigaray, Luce (1977). This Sex Which Is Not One. (Eng. trans. 1985), ISBN 9780801493317.
- Irigaray, Luce (1980). Marine Lover: Of Friedrich Nietzsche. (Eng. trans. 1991 by Gillian C. Gill), ISBN 9780231070829.
- Irigaray, Luce (1982). Elemental Passions. (Eng. trans. 1992), ISBN 9780415906920.
- Irigaray, Luce (1983). The Forgetting of Air: In Martin Heidegger. (Eng. trans. 1999), ISBN 9780292738720.
- Irigaray, Luce (1984). An Ethics of Sexual Difference. (Eng. trans. 1993 by Gillian C. Gill), ISBN 9780801481451.
- Irigaray, Luce (1985). To Speak is Never Neutral. (Eng. trans. 2002), ISBN 9780826459046.
- Irigaray, Luce (1987). Sexes and Genealogies. (Eng. trans. 1993 by Gillian C. Gill), ISBN 9780231070331.
- Irigaray, Luce (1989). Thinking the Difference: For a Peaceful Revolution. (Eng. trans. 1993), ISBN 9780485114263.
- Irigaray, Luce (1990). Je, tu, nous: Towards a Culture of Difference. (Eng. trans. 1993), ISBN 9780415905824.
- Irigaray, Luce (1990). I Love to You: Sketch for a Felicity Within History. (Eng. trans. 1993), ISBN 9780415907323.
- Irigaray, Luce (1994). Democracy Begins Between Two. (Eng. trans. 2000), ISBN 9780415918169.
- Irigaray, Luce (1997). To Be Two. (Eng. trans. 2001), ISBN 9780415918145.
- Irigaray, Luce (1999). Between East and West: From Singularity to Community. (Eng. trans. 2001), ISBN 9780231119351.
- Irigaray, Luce (2000). Why Different?, ISBN 9780801493300.
- Irigaray, Luce (2002). The Way of Love.ISBN 9780826473271.
- Irigaray, Luce (2008). Sharing the World. (Eng. trans. 2008), ISBN 9781847060341.
- Irigaray, Luce (2008). Conversations, ISBN 9781847060365.
- Irigaray, Luce (2013). In the Beginning, She Was. ISBN 9781441106377
- Irigaray, Luce; Marder, Michael (2016). Through Vegetal Being: Two Philosophical Perspectives. ISBN 9780231173865.
- Irigaray, Luce (2017). To Be Born: Genesis of a New Human Being. ISBN 9783319392219.
- Irigaray, Luce (2019). Sharing the Fire: Outline of a Dialectics of Sensitivity. ISBN 9783030283292.
- Irigaray, Luce (2021). A New Culture of Energy: Beyond East and West. (Eng. trans. 2021), ISBN 9780231177139

=== Papers ===
- Irigaray, Luce (1996), "This sex which is not one", in Jackson, Stevi; Scott, Sue (eds.), Feminism and sexuality: a reader, New York: Columbia University Press, pp. 79–83, ISBN 9780231107082.
- Irigaray, Luce (1997), "This sex which is not one", in Nicholson, Linda (ed.), The second wave: a reader in feminist theory, New York: Routledge, pp. 323–329, ISBN 9780415917612.
- Luce Irigaray (1999), "Philosophy in the Feminine", Feminist Review, Volume 42, Issue 1, pp 111–114, ISSN 1466-4380.
- Irigaray, Luce (2005), "In science, is the subject sexed?", in Gutting, Gary (ed.), Continental philosophy of science, Blackwell Readings in Continental Philosophy Series, Malden, Massachusetts: Blackwell Publishing, pp. 283–292, ISBN 9780631236108.
- Irigaray, Luce (1981), "And the One Doesn't Stir Without the Other", Signs, Vol. 7, No. 1, pp. 60–67.
- Irigaray, Luce (1980), "When Our Lips Speak Together", Signs, Vol. 6, No. 1, pp. 69–79.

== See also ==
- Feminism and the Oedipus complex
- List of deconstructionists
- Strategic essentialism
- Unsaid
