= The Symbolic =

Term in Lacanian psychoanalysis

In Lacanian psychoanalysis, the Symbolic (or Symbolic Order of the Borromean knot) is the order in the unconscious that gives rise to subjectivity and bridges intersubjectivity between two subjects; an example is Jacques Lacan's idea of desire as the desire of the Other, maintained by the Symbolic's subjectification of the Other into speech. In the later psychoanalytic theory of Lacan, it is linked by the sinthome to the Imaginary and the Real.

== Overview ==
'It is in the dimension of a synchrony that you must situate the unconscious' (SXI: 26).

— Lacan

In Lacan's theory, the unconscious is the discourse of the Other and thus belongs to the Symbolic. It is also the realm of the Law that regulates desire in the Oedipus complex, and is determinant of subjectivity. A formative moment in the development of the Symbolic in a subject is the Other giving rise to the objet petit (a)utre, establishing lack, demand and need. However, when it becomes an empty signifier, psychosis, which Freud had failed to tackle in theory, develops from an unstable metonymic sliding of the signified (i.e., foreclosure). "The signifier", which in Lacan's theory is above the signified as opposed to Saussure's unity of signifier and signified, "is that which represents a subject for another signifier."

Early on, Lacan considered his attempt "to distinguish between those elementary registers whose grounding I later put forward in these terms: the symbolic, the imaginary, and the real" to be "a distinction never previously made in psychoanalysis", because Freud had not encountered semiotic ideas, but had encountered phenomena in case studies that warranted a semiotic understanding.

== Quilting point ==
Lacan uses a French double entendre of nom (name) vs. non (no-no) to contextualize Freudian incest prohibition into a figurative, linguistic framework; the name-of-the-father (no-of-the-father) signifier quilts the lattice of signifiers with a "paternal metaphor", a master signifier that "double stitches" the meaning of the Symbolic Order over the Imaginary Order by establishing the Law, a prohibition of imaginary demand by supplanting symbolic desire.

The name-of-the-father is a "binary signifier" while the phallus is a "unary signifier".

Lacan's term for such elected transcendental constants is the 'point de capiton,' which Žižek describes as the ultimately fake 'quasi-transcendental master signifier that guarantees the consistency of the big Other.'

— Andrea Hurst

== History ==
Lacan's early work was centred on an exploration of the Imaginary, of those "specific images, which we refer to by the ancient term of imago.…it set out from their formative function in the subject." Therefore "the notion of the 'symbolic came to the forefront in the Rome Report [1953]…henceforth it is the symbolic, not the imaginary, that is seen to be the determining order of the subject."

Lacan's concept of the symbolic "owes much to a key event in the rise of structuralism…the publication of Claude Lévi-Strauss's Elementary Structures of Kinship in 1949.… In many ways, the symbolic is for Lacan an equivalent to Lévi-Strauss's order of culture:" a language-mediated order of culture. Therefore, "Man speaks…but it is because the symbol has made him man" which "superimposes the kingdom of culture on that of a nature."Accepting that "language is the basic social institution in the sense that all others presuppose language," Lacan found in Ferdinand de Saussure's linguistic division of the verbal sign between signifier and signified a new key to the Freudian understanding that "his therapeutic method was 'a talking cure.'"

=== Predominance of the idea ===
For a decade or so after the Rome Report, Lacan found in the concept of the Symbolic an answer to the neurotic problematic of the Imaginary: "It is the task of symbolism to forbid imaginary capture […] supremacy of the symbolic over the imaginary […] supremacy of the symbolic over the real." Accepting through Lévi-Strauss the anthropological premise that "man is indeed an 'animal symbolicum'", and that "the self-illumination of society through symbols is an essential part of social reality," Lacan made the leap to seeing "the Oedipus complex—in so far as we continue to recognise it as covering the whole field of our experience with its signification"—as the point whereby the weight of social reality was mediated to the developing child by the (symbolic) father: "It is in the name of the Father that we must recognize the support of the symbolic function which, from the dawn of history, has identified his person with the figure of the law."

The imaginary now came to be seen increasingly as belonging to the earlier, closed realm of the dual relationship of mother and child—"Melanie Klein describes the relation to the mother as a mirrored relationship […] [neglecting] the third term, the father"—to be broken up and opened to the wider symbolic order.

Lacan's shorthand for that wider world was the Other—"the big other, that is, the other of language, the Names-of-the-Father, signifiers or words [which] […] are public, communal property." But though it is an essentially linguistic dimension, Lacan does not simply equate the symbolic with language, since the latter is involved also in the Imaginary and the Real. The symbolic dimension of language is that of the signifier, in which elements have no positive existence but are constituted by virtue of their mutual differences.

=== Changes in the idea's meaning ===
With the increasing use of Lacanian theory in psychoanalysis in the Sixties, the Symbolic was seen more as an inseparable quality of the human condition, rather than as a register for a therapeutic cure-all. Lacan's critical attention began to shift instead to the concept of the Real, seen as "that over which the symbolic stumbles […] that which is lacking in the symbolic order, the ineliminable residue of all articulation […] the umbilical cord of the symbolic."

By the turn of the decade (1968–71), "Lacan gradually came to dismiss the Oedipus […] as 'Freud's dream'", despite his own earlier warning of the dangers if "one wishes to ignore the symbolic articulation that Freud discovered at the same time as the unconscious…his methodical reference to the Oedipus complex."

Whether his development of the concept of jouissance, or "the 'identification with the sinthome' (as the naming of one's Real) advocated in Lacan's last works as the aim of psychoanalysis," will in time prove as fruitful as that of the symbolic order perhaps remains to be seen. Part of Lacan's enduring legacy will surely however remain bound up with the triumphal exploration of the symbolic order that was the Rome Report: "Symbols in fact envelop the life of man in a network so total that they join together […] the shape of his destiny."

== Notable figures ==
- Louis Althusser
- Alain Badiou
- Georges Bataille
- Maurice Blanchot
- Sigmund Freud
- Julia Kristeva
- Philippe Lacoue-Labarthe
- Jean-Luc Nancy

== See also ==
- Amor fati
- Anima and animus
- Delphic maxims
- Four discourses
- Interpellation (philosophy)
- Logocentrism
- Logosphere
- Phallocentrism
- Phenomenology (philosophy)
- Psychogeography
- Semiosphere
- Social philosophy
- Sociology of space
- Spectacle (critical theory)
- Umwelt
- Worldview
