= Sinthome =

Psychoanlaytic concept

Sinthome (French: [sɛ̃tom]) is a concept introduced by Jacques Lacan in his seminar Le sinthome (1975–76). It redefines the psychoanalytic symptom in terms of the role of the subject outside of analysis, where enjoyment is made possible through creative identification with the symptom.

== Overview ==
The idea of the sinthome was the final stage in Lacan's exploration of the Freudian conception of the symptom which gradually emerges through analysis, and especially Freud's conception of neuroses which emerge from a struggle for pleasure. Lacan first viewed the symptom as something inscribed in a writing process of the unconscious, not as a completed ciphered message calling for interpretation: it is not a call to the Other and has no addressee. For example, in the first seminar, explaining the Freudian concept of the "return of the repressed", Lacan compares the emergence of the symptom with a scenario posited by American cyberneticist Norbert Wiener:

Wiener posits two beings each of whose temporal dimension moves in the opposite direction from the other. To be sure, that means nothing, and that is how things which mean nothing all of a sudden signify something, but in a quite different domain. If one of them sends a message to the other, for example a square, the being going in the opposite direction will first of all see the square vanishing, before seeing the square. That is what we see as well. The symptom initially appears to us as a trace, which will only ever be a trace, one which will continue not to be understood until the analysis has got quite a long way, and until we have discovered its meaning.

In the third seminar on the psychoses, Lacan defined psychosis as the intrusion of foreclosure, or Verwerfung, into the subject, contrasted with neurosis as the grounding of the subject in repression. The topic of psychosis provided him with a path for the continuation of his exploration of the symptom, with Freud's case study of Daniel Paul Schreber used in particular as an illustration of the misstep that can be made in analysis to attempt to interpret the symptom. Considering Lacan's reading of the case study where he notes that Schreber used common language to explain his otherwise expressively rich psychoses, approaching the sinthome but failing to escape the detrimental symptoms of psychosis, Russell Grigg observes that "there is a moment when [Schreber] is called, interpellated, by—or perhaps better 'in'—the Name-of-the-Father. This is when the lack of the signifier declares itself, and it is sufficient to trigger the psychosis."

However, in the 1970s, he radically departed from the previous linguistic definition of the symptom as a signifier with which scenes are constructed. This departure was accompanied by the idea of the sinthome, the process of "the idiosyncratic jouissance of a particular subject", functioning as a creative enjoyment of the symptom that intertwines with the Real to relay itself to the Symbolic and the Imaginary, and as an escape from the struggle for pleasure caused by the symptom for the subject.

== Position in the Borromean knot ==
Lacan's shift from a lingual psychoanalysis to a topological psychoanalysis concluded with the status of the sinthome as unanalyzable. The seminar on the sinthome extends the theory of the Borromean knot, which in the RSI (Real, Symbolic, Imaginary) seminar had been proposed as the structure of the subject by adding the sinthome as the fourth ring to the triad already mentioned, tying together a knot which constantly threatens to come undone. The topic of the seminar was the life and work of James Joyce: "the sign of [Lacan's] entanglement is indeed Joyce, precisely inasmuch as what he puts forth, and in a way that is quite especially that of an artist because he has the know-how to pull it off, is the sinthome, and a sinthome such that there is nothing to be done to analyse it."

Clinical psychologist Jonathan D. Redmond has suggested using the idea "to denote specific signifiers in the real that, for reasons specific to the individual, may take on a supplementary function in psychic structure. In this sense, the sinthome is 'a piece of the real' linking jouissance to a signifier that is able to take on the supplementary function of the Name-of-the-Father." Since meaning (or sens in Lacan's seminars) is already figured within the knot, at the intersection of the Symbolic and the Imaginary, it follows that the function of the sinthome, knotting together the Real, the Imaginary and the Symbolic, is beyond meaning—especially in the framework of analysis—and is essentially a personal, idiosyncratic route to control over jouissance, catharsis and unprecedented creativity. Roberto Harari writes in his study of the seminar, How James Joyce Made His Name, that it is "a question of the occurrence, without it being sought, of a certain experience that leads to the unique point of inventing one's own sinthome. […] The suffering entailed by the symptom is certainly not at work in the same way in the sinthome, linked as it is to the epiphanic quality of inventing something".

=== Žižek's interpretation ===
Extending from his use of the Lacanian framework, Slovenian philosopher Slavoj Žižek variously expounds on the idea of the sinthome, in particular in The Sublime Object of Ideology. He asserts, working off of Lacan's general idea that enjoyment of the symptom as sinthome radicalizes the subject, that "symptom, conceived as sinthome, is […] the only point that gives consistency to the subject. In other words, symptom is the way we—the subjects—'avoid madness', […] through the binding of our enjoyment to a certain signifying, symbolic formation which assures a minimum of consistency to our being-in-the-world"; ultimately, in practice, "the final Lacanian definition of the end of the psychoanalytic process is identification with the symptom", and, in its aftermath, a collaboration between the subject and its symptom to make a sinthome, for instance with art, particularly with Lacan's initial example of James Joyce.

== See also ==
- Matheme
