= Lack (psychoanalysis) =

Concept that is always related to desire

In Jacques Lacan's psychoanalytic philosophy, lack (French: manque) is a concept that is always related to desire. In his seminar Le transfert (1960–61) he states that lack is what causes desire to arise.

== Types of lack ==
Lacan first designated a lack of being: what is desired is being itself. "Desire is a relation to being to lack. The lack is the lack of being properly speaking. It is not the lack of this or that, but lack of being whereby the being exists" (Seminar: The Ego in Freud's Theory and in the Technique of Psychoanalysis). In "The Direction of the Treatment and the Principles of Its Power" (Écrits) Lacan argues that desire is the metonymy of the lack of being (manque à être): the subject's lack of being is at the heart of the analytic experience and the very field in which the neurotic's passion is deployed. In "Guiding Remarks for a Convention on Feminine Sexuality" Lacan contrasts the lack of being related to desire with the lack of having (manque à avoir) which he relates to demand.

Starting in his seminar La relation d'objet, Lacan distinguishes between three kinds of lack, according to the nature of the object which is lacking. The first one is Symbolic Castration and its object related is the Imaginary Phallus; the second one is Imaginary Frustration and its object related is the Real Breast; the third kind of lack is Real Privation and its object related is the Symbolic Phallus. The three corresponding agents are the Real Father, the Symbolic Mother, and the Imaginary Father. Of these three forms of lack, castration is the most important from the perspective of the cure.

It is in La relation d'objet that Lacan introduces the algebraic symbol for the barred Other, and lack comes to designate the lack of the signifier in the Other. Then the relation of the subject to the lack of the signifier in the Other, designates the signifier of a lack in the Other. No matter how many signifiers one adds to the signifying chain, the chain is always incomplete, it always lacks the signifier that could complete it. This missing signifier is then constitutive of the subject.

== Lack of phallus ==
The symbolic version of the phallus, a phallic symbol is meant to represent male generative powers. According to Sigmund Freud's theory of psychoanalysis, while males possess a penis, no one can possess the symbolic phallus. Jacques Lacan's Écrits includes an essay titled The Signification of the Phallus which articulates the difference between "being" and "having" the phallus. Men are positioned as men insofar as they are seen to have the phallus. Women, not having the phallus, are seen to "be" the phallus. The symbolic phallus is the concept of being the ultimate man, and having this is compared to having the divine gift of God.

In Gender Trouble (1990), Judith Butler explores Freud's and Lacan's discussions of the symbolic phallus by pointing out the connection between the phallus and the penis. They write, "The law requires conformity to its own notion of 'nature'. It gains its legitimacy through the binary and asymmetrical naturalization of bodies in which the phallus, though clearly not identical to the penis, deploys the penis as its naturalized instrument and sign" (135). In Bodies that Matter, they further explore the possibilities for the phallus in their discussion of the lesbian phallus. If, as they note, Freud enumerates a set of analogies and substitutions that rhetorically affirm the fundamental transferability of the phallus from the penis elsewhere, then any number of other things might come to stand in for the phallus (62).

== Criticism ==
In Anti-Oedipus, Gilles Deleuze and Félix Guattari postulate that desire does not arise from lack, but rather is a productive force (desiring-production) in itself.

== See also ==
- Demand

== Sources and external links ==
- Lacan Dot Com
- The Seminars of Jacques Lacan
- "How to Read Lacan" by Slavoj Zizek – full version
- Chronology of Jacques Lacan

Specific
