= Graph of desire =

Psychoanalytic tool devised by Jacques Lacan

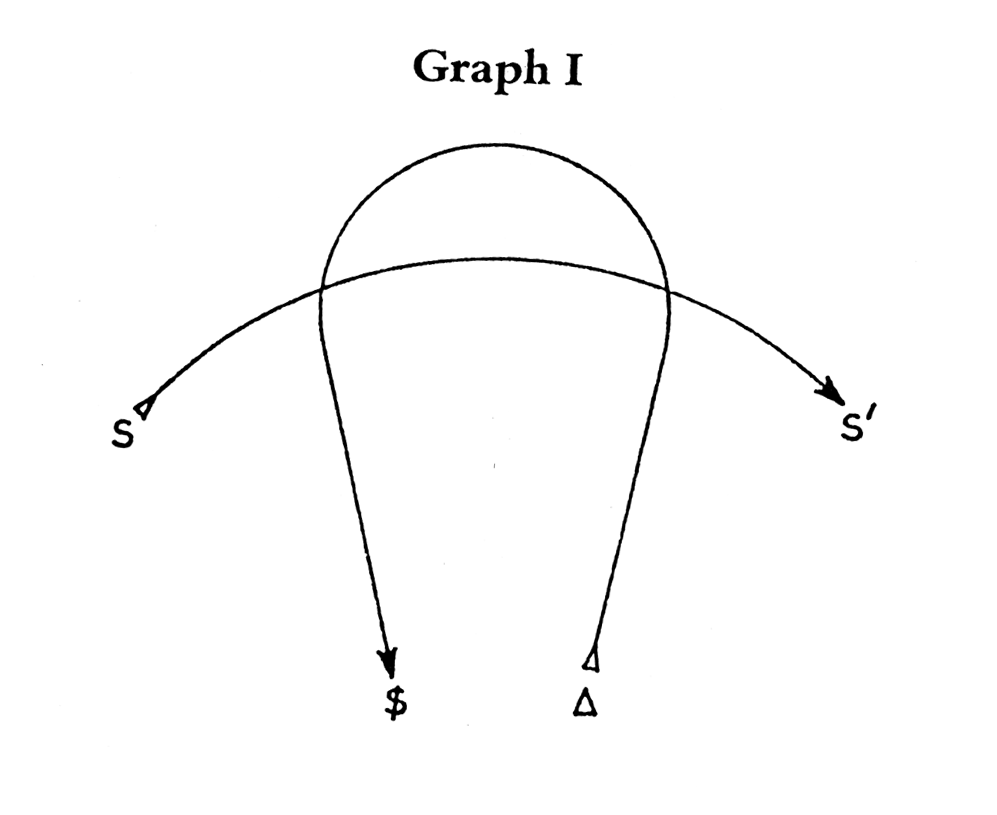
The most basic section of the Graph of Desire, as published in Lacan's essay "The Subversion of the Subject and the Dialectic of Desire in the Freudian Unconscious."

The graph of desire (French: graphe du désir) is a conceptual tool in Lacanianism.

== History ==
Lacan devised numerous quasi-mathematical diagrams to represent the structure of the unconscious and its points of contact with empirical and mental reality. He adapted figures from the field of topology in order to represent the Freudian view of the mind as embodying a "double inscription" (which could be defined as the ultimate inseparability of unconscious motivations from conscious ones).

Although commonly attributed to "The Subversion of the Subject and the Dialectic of Desire in the Freudian Unconscious," a 1960 article published in Lacan's Ecrits, it originally appeared during Lacan's 1957–58 seminar (Formations of the Unconscious).

== Graph ==
It depends on ideas developed originally in Lacan's Schema R, a graph in which fundamental organising structures of the human mind are shown in a schematic relationship to the domains or "orders" which in turn structure human reality: the Imaginary, the Symbolic and the Real.

The graph of desire is a "flattened" representation of a signifying chain as it crosses a pathway Lacan called a vector of desire. It appears as two curved lines which cross one another at two separate points. Each line has a symbolic meaning.

=== Elements of the graph ===
The signifying chain begins in a linguistic sign (S) and progresses to a signification (S'), or a linguistic meaning. It can be expressed sequentially and has a duration.

The vector of desire is a representation of the volition and will of the split or barred subject ($). Unlike the signifying chain, the vector of desire is expressed metaphorically, and has no duration.

It is necessary to bear in mind the special conception of the subject Lacan means by the $ symbol. The barred subject is the internally conflicted result of the processes of individuation that begin in infancy. In Lacan's account of individuation, the infant must respond to the loss of symbiosis with the mother by creating a symbol of this lack. In doing so the infant is constrained by the always-already present structures of a natural language. There is a certain relief in the summoning of a symbolically present "mother", but the experience of the mother who returns to the infant as someone-signified-by-the-word-"mother" is nevertheless one of absolute, irremediable loss. Mother—and the world—is now mediated by the Symbolic order and the exigencies of language.

With this in mind, the crossing of the two pathways in the graph of desire can be understood to connote interference and constraint. Desire for the primordial object is not fulfilled except through the constraints of the signifying chain. The vector of desire is metaphorical, substituting various objects for the absolutely lost primordial one, and irrupting into language without regard for the passage of time, or for the particular human relationship through which the vector moves.

Finally, the points at which the vector of desire and the signifying chain cross can be seen as instances of Freudian double inscription. The "conscious and unconscious" significance of an act or utterance are one and the same, and each constrains the other.

== See also ==
- Demand
- Desire
