= Matheme =

Concept in Lacanian thought

The matheme (French: mathème, from Greek: μάθημα "lesson") is a concept introduced in the work of the 20th century French psychoanalyst Jacques Lacan. The term matheme "occurred for the first time in the lecture Lacan delivered on November 4th, 1971 [...] Between 1972 and 1973 he gave several definitions of it, passing from the use of the singular to the use of the plural and back again".

== Characteristics ==
David Macey writes in his introduction to the translation of Lacan's The Four Fundamental Concepts of Psychoanalysis that "Lacan saw his "matheme" as something that would ensure the integral transmission of his teachings ... proof against the "noise" or interference inherent in any process of communication". They are formulae, designed as symbolic representations of his ideas and analyses. They were intended to introduce some degree of technical rigour in philosophical and psychological writing, replacing the often hard-to-understand verbal descriptions with formulae resembling those used in the hard sciences, and as an easy way to hold, remember, and rehearse some of the core ideas of both Freud and Lacan. For example: "$<>a" is the matheme for fantasy in the Lacanian sense, in which "$" refers to the subject as split into the subject of utterance and uttered subject (hence the matheme is a barred S), "a" stands for the object-cause of desire, and "<>" stands for the relationship between the two.

A more complex set of mathemes are Lacan's "formulae of sexuation" which he outlined in the March 13, 1973, session of his Seminar XX. Composed of two pairs of propositions written in a unique logico-mathematical shorthand inspired by Gottlob Frege, one pair was dubbed 'masculine' and the other 'feminine.' These formulae Lacan originally constructed from Aristotelian logic over the course of an entire year of study. The "matheme", for Lacan, is not simply the imitation of science by philosophy, but the ideal of a perfect means for the integral transmission of knowledge. Natural language, with its constant "metonymic slide", fails here, where mathematics succeeds. Contemporary philosopher Alain Badiou identifies "matheme" with the scientific procedure.

== Criticism ==
Though sometimes disparaged as a case of "physics envy" or accused of introducing false rigor into a discipline that is more literary theory than hard science, there is also something of a sense of humor in Lacan's formulas: of one 'sigla which I have introduced in the form of an algorithm', Lacan himself has declared that 'it is created to allow for a hundred and one different readings, a multiplicity that is admissible as long as the spoken remains caught in its algebra'.

Serge Leclaire, who is one of the most respected and distinguished of all French analysts, remarked in 1975, for example, that whilst the mathemes might have a certain pedagogic utility, they were basically no more than "graffiti"'.
