= The Instance of the Letter in the Unconscious, or Reason Since Freud =

1957 essay by Jacques Lacan

"The Instance of the Letter in the Unconscious, or Reason Since Freud" (French: L'instance de la lettre dans l'inconscient) is an essay by the psychoanalyst Jacques Lacan, originally delivered as a talk on May 9, 1957, and later published in Lacan's 1966 book Écrits.

Lacan begins the essay by declaring it to be "situated halfway" between speech and writing. By doing so, he foreshadows both the essay's notorious opacity and its theme: the relationship between speech and language and the place of the subject in relation to both. The paper represents a key moment in 'his resolutely structuralist notion of the structure of the subject ', as well as in his gradual 'incorporation of the findings of linguistics and anthropology...in the rise of structuralism'.

== The Meaning of the Letter ==
The essay's first section, 'The Meaning of the Letter', introduces the concept of "the letter", which Lacan describes as 'the material support that concrete discourse borrows from language'. In his commentary on the essay, the Lacanian psychoanalyst Bruce Fink argues that "the letter" is best thought of as the differential element which separates two words, noting that:

"In a hundred years, 'drizzle' might be pronounced 'dritszel', but that will be of no importance as long as the place occupied by the consonant in the middle of the word is filled by something that allows us to continue to differentiate the word from other similar words in the English language, such as 'dribble'."

Lacan indicates that the letter, when thought of as a "material medium" in this way, cannot be directly manipulated so as to alter language or intersubjective meaning. In a footnote to the essay, he praises Joseph Stalin for rejecting the idea (promoted by some communist philosophers) of creating 'a new language in communist society with the following formulation: language is not a superstructure'.

== The letter in the unconscious ==
Lacan uses his concept of the letter to distance himself from the Jungian approach to symbols and the unconscious. Whereas Jung believes that there is a collective unconscious which works with symbolic archetypes, Lacan insists that we must read the productions of the unconscious à la lettre - in other words, literally to the letter (or, more specifically, the concept of the letter which Lacan's essay seeks to introduce).

In Freud's theory of dreams, the individual's unconscious takes advantage of the weakened ego during sleep in order to produce thoughts which have been censored during the individual's wakened life. Using Lacan's concept of the letter, we should be able to see how, in Fink's example, the unconscious cleverly produces the censored thought associated with the word "algorithm". (Of course, this does not actually tell us why this particular hypothetical analysand has consciously censored a thought associated with the word "algorithm".)

== The signifier and the signified ==
Because Lacan's use of the concept "the letter" requires a concept of materiality different from anything previously found in linguistics, Lacan argues that the signifier and signified are separated by a bar: 'the signifier over the signified, "over" corresponding to the bar separating the two stages'. The signifiers can slide over the top of this bar, with the signified elements beneath. This means that there is never an easy correlation between signifier and signified and, as a result, all language and communication is actually produced by the failure to fully communicate.

The asymmetrical relationship between signifier and signified is further complicated by the fact that the bar between them cannot itself be signified: 'the S and the s of the Saussurian algorithm are not on the same level, and man only deludes himself when he believes his true place is at their axis'.

=== Phallus ===
Such a formulation enabled Lacan subsequently to assert that 'the phallus is a signifier...not a phantasy...[and] even less the organ, penis or clitoris, that it symbolizes'. Theorists such as Slavoj Žižek have frequently pointed out this fact in order to defend Lacan against his feminist critics.

== Metonymy and desire, metaphor and the subject ==
Lacan aligns desire with metonymy and the slide of signifiers above the bar, 'indicating that it is the connection between signifier and signifier that permits the lesion in which the signifier installs the lack-of-being in the object relation...in order to invest it with the desire aimed at the very lack it supports'. This produces a situation in which desire is never satisfied, 'being caught in the rails - eternally stretching forth towards the desire for something else - of metonymy' Partly for this reason, one's desires can never be identified in a statement along the lines of: 'I desire x, y and z'. Instead, desire is slippery and metonymical.

Lacanian theorists often note that capitalist consumerism is predicated upon this fact about desire: because desire is never satisfied and yet, always sliding from one signifier to the other, the capitalist subject finds him or herself making an endless series of purchases in order to satisfy their desire.

The way out of this metonymical chain of unsatisfied desire, for Lacan, is a "crossing of the bar" by a signifier: Lacan emphasises 'the constitutive value of this crossing for the emergence of signification'. Lacan aligns this operation with metaphor rather than metonymy. When a signifier crosses the bar, from above it to under it, it becomes a signified. But this leaves a space or gap above the bar which, according to Lacan, is the subject. In Lacanian psychoanalysis, the subject only appears fleetingly, on those rare occasions when a signifier crosses the bar, leaving an empty space above it.

== "Wo Es war, soll Ich werden" ==
With the fleetingness of the subject established, Lacan closes the essay by developing a maxim of Sigmund Freud's: "Wo Es war, soll Ich werden" (usually translated as: "where the id was, the ego shall be"). Rather than strengthening the ego as the great intellectual and ideological rival of Lacanian psychoanalysis, ego psychology, encouraged the patient to do, Lacan claims that the analysand 'must come to the place where that was...modifying the moorings that anchor his being'.

This means breaking out of the metonymy of desire by crossing the bar.

== Criticism ==
'Whereas Saussure placed the signifier over the signified, dividing the two by a bar of "meaning", Lacan inverted this arrangement, placing the signified under the signifier, to which he ascribes the primary role'. In the same way, 'like Jakobson Lacan associated the Freudian idea of condensation with metaphor and displacement with metonymy'. Critics would contend that we see here a typical example of the way 'Lacan was...an intellectual magpie', illegitimately borrowing the intellectual kudos of linguistics to give a respectable veneer to his psychoanalytic theories, without submitting to the actual rigors of the discipline itself. It should be noted, however, that a criticism such as this remains a point of extreme controversy, and is not at all acknowledged as an informed criticism by Lacanian theorists.

Nevertheless, Élisabeth Roudinesco concludes that 'this extraordinary intellectual operation, by means of which Lacan endowed psychoanalytic doctrine with a Cartesian theory of the subject and a "post-Saussurian" conception of the unconscious...alone would earn him a place among the great theoreticians of the twentieth century'.
