= Gilles & Jeanne =

1983 novella by Michel Tournier

Gilles & Jeanne: A Novel (French: Gilles & Jeanne: Récit) is a 1983 novella by Michel Tournier, published by Éditions Gallimard. It was translated into English by Alan Sheridan, and this translation was published by Grove Weidenfeld in the United States, and by Methuen Publishing in the United Kingdom.

Tournier categorized the work as a "récit".

== Story ==
In the work, Gilles de Rais is in love with Joan of Arc, who presents herself in a masculine style. After Joan dies, Gilles begins to victimize and murder boys, and faces execution for doing so.

== Reception ==
Publishers Weekly described the work as being "fervent and striking".

Galen Strawson, in The Observer, criticized the translation, stating that it weakens the text and that it makes many mistakes. Strawson stated that the "extremely poor" translation ought to "be withdrawn immediately."
