= Philosophy of desire =

Concept in philosophy

In philosophy, desire has been identified as a recurring philosophical problem. It has been variously interpreted as what compels someone towards the highest state of human nature or consciousness, as well as being posited as either something to be eliminated or a powerful source of potential.

In Plato's The Republic, Socrates argued that individual desires must be postponed in the name of a higher ideal. Similarly, within the teachings of Buddhism, craving, identified as the most potent form of desire, is thought to be the cause of all suffering, which can be eliminated to attain greater happiness (Nirvana). While on the path to liberation, a practitioner is advised to "generate desire" for skillful ends.

== History ==
=== Ancient Greece ===
Plato uses the term epithumia to refer to both desire as a broad category and as a specific kind of desire. Aristotle clarifies the varying notions by specifying that overarching category is orexis. Within that category, epithumia is a type of desire along with boulêsis (wish) and thumos (spirited thinking).

In Aristotle's De Anima the soul is seen to be involved in motion, because animals desire things and in their desire, they acquire locomotion. Aristotle argued that desire is implicated in animal interactions and the propensity of animals to motion. But Aristotle acknowledges that desire cannot account for all purposive movement towards a goal. He brackets the problem by positing that perhaps reason, in conjunction with desire and by way of the imagination, makes it possible for one to apprehend an object of desire, to see it as desirable. In this way reason and desire work together to determine what is a good object of desire. This resonates with desire in the chariots of Plato's Phaedrus, for in the Phaedrus the soul is guided by two horses, a dark horse of passion and a white horse of reason. Here passion and reason, as in Aristotle, are also together. Socrates does not suggest the dark horse be done away with, since its passions make possible a movement towards the objects of desire, but he qualifies desire and places it in a relation to reason so that the object of desire can be discerned correctly, so that we may have the right desire. Aristotle distinguishes desire into two aspects of appetition, and volition. Appetition, or appetite, is a longing for or seeking after something; a craving.

Aristotle makes the distinction as follows:

Everything, too, is pleasant for which we have the desire within us, since desire is the craving for pleasure. Of the desires some are irrational, some associated with reason. By irrational I mean those which do not arise from any opinion held by the mind. Of this kind are those known as ‘natural’; for instance, those originating in the body, such as the desire for nourishment, namely hunger and thirst, and a separate kind of desire answering to each kind of nourishment; and the desires connected with taste and sex and sensations of touch in general; and those of smell, hearing, and vision. Rational desires are those which we are induced to have; there are many things we desire to see or get because we have been told of them and induced to believe them good.

=== Western philosophers ===
In Passions of the Soul, René Descartes writes of the passion of desire as an agitation of the soul that projects desire, for what it represents as agreeable, into the future. Desire in Immanuel Kant can represent things that are absent and not only objects at hand. Desire is also the preservation of objects already present, as well as the desire that certain effects not appear, that what affects one adversely be curtailed and prevented in the future. Moral and temporal values attach to desire in that objects which enhance one's future are considered more desirable than those that do not, and it introduces the possibility, or even necessity, of postponing desire in anticipation of some future event, anticipating Sigmund Freud's text Beyond the Pleasure Principle. See also, the pleasure principle in psychology.

In his Ethics, Baruch Spinoza declares desire to be "the very essence of man," in the "Definitions of the Affects" at the end of Part III. An early example of desire as an ontological principle, it applies to all things or "modes" in the world, each of which has a particular vital "striving" (sometimes expressed with the Latin "conatus") to persist in existence (Part III, Proposition 7). Different striving beings have different levels of power, depending on their capacity to persevere in being. Affects, or emotions which are divided into the joyful and the sad, alter our level of power or striving: joy is a passage "from a lesser to a greater perfection" or degree of power (III Prop. 11 Schol.), just as sadness is the opposite. Desire, qualified by the imagination and the intellect, is an attempt to maximize power, to "strive to imagine those things that increase or aid the body's power of acting." (III Prop. 12). Spinoza ends the Ethics by a proposition that both moral virtue and spiritual blessedness are a direct result of essential power to exist, i.e. desire (Part V Prop. 42).

In A Treatise on Human Nature, David Hume suggests that reason is subject to passion. Motion is put into effect by desire, passions, and inclinations. It is desire, along with belief, that motivates action. Immanuel Kant establishes a relation between the beautiful and pleasure in Critique of Judgment. He says "I can say of every representation that it is at least possible (as a cognition) it should be bound up with a pleasure. Of representation that I call pleasant I say that it actually excites pleasure in me. But the beautiful we think as having a necessary reference to satisfaction." Desire is found in the representation of the object.

Georg Wilhelm Friedrich Hegel begins his exposition of desire in Phenomenology of Spirit with the assertion that "self-consciousness is the state of desire (German: Begierde) in general." It is in the restless movement of the negative that desire removes the antithesis between itself and its object, "and the object of immediate desire is a living thing," an object that forever remains an independent existence, something other. Hegel's inflection of desire via stoicism becomes important in understanding desire as it appears in Marquis de Sade. Stoicism in this view has a negative attitude towards "otherness, to desire, and work."

Reading Maurice Blanchot in this regard, in his essay Sade's Reason, the libertine is one of a type that sometimes intersects with a Sadean man, who finds in stoicism, solitude, and apathy the proper conditions. Blanchot writes, "the libertine is thoughtful, self-contained, incapable of being moved by just anything." Apathy in de Sade is opposition not to desire but to its spontaneity. Blanchot writes that in Sade, "for passion to become energy, it is necessary that it be constricted, that it be mediated by passing through a necessary moment of insensibility, then it will be the greatest passion possible." Here is stoicism, as a form of discipline, through which the passions pass. Blanchot says, "Apathy is the spirit of negation, applied to the man who has chosen to be sovereign." Dispersed, uncontrolled passion does not augment one's creative force but it gets diminished.

In his Principia Ethica, British philosopher G. E. Moore argued that two theories of desire should be clearly distinguished. The hedonistic theory of John Stuart Mill states that pleasure is the sole object of all desire. Mill suggests that a desire for an object is caused by an idea of the possible pleasure that would result from the attainment of the object. The desire is fulfilled when this pleasure is achieved. On this view, the pleasure is the sole motivating factor of the desire. Moore proposes an alternative theory in which an actual pleasure is already present in the desire for the object and that the desire is then for that object and only indirectly for any pleasure that results from attaining it.

"In the first place, plainly, we are not always conscious of expecting pleasure, when we desire a thing. We may only be conscious of the thing which we desire, and may be impelled to make for it at once, without any calculation as to whether it will bring us pleasure or pain. In the second place, even when we do expect pleasure, it can certainly be very rarely pleasure only which we desire.

On Moore's view, Mill's theory is too non-specific as to the objects of desire. Moore provides the following example:

"For instance, granted that, when I desire my glass of port wine, I have also an idea of the pleasure I expect from it, plainly that pleasure cannot be the only object of my desire; the port wine must be included in my object, else I might be led by my desire to take wormwood instead of wine . . . If the desire is to take a definite direction, it is absolutely necessary that the idea of the object, from which the pleasure is expected, should also be present and should control my activity."

For Charles Fourier, following desires (like passions or in Fourier's own words 'attractions') is a means to attain harmony.

=== Buddhism ===
Within the teachings of Siddhartha Gautama (Buddhism), craving is thought to be the cause of all suffering that one experiences in human existence. The extinction of this craving leads one to ultimate happiness, or Nirvana. Nirvana means "cessation", "extinction" (of suffering) or "extinguished", "quieted", "calmed"; it is also known as "Awakening" or "Enlightenment" in the West. The Four Noble Truths were the first teaching of Gautama Buddha after attaining Nirvana. They state that suffering is an inevitable part of life as we know it. The cause of this suffering is attachment to, or craving for worldly pleasures of all kinds and clinging to this very existence, our "self" and the things or people we—due to our delusions—deem the cause of our respective happiness or unhappiness. The suffering ends when the craving and desire ends, or one is freed from all desires by eliminating the delusions, reaches "Enlightenment".

While greed and lust are always unskillful, desire is ethically variable—it can be skillful, unskillful, or neutral. In the Buddhist perspective, the enemy to be defeated is craving rather than desire in general.

=== Psychoanalysis ===
Jacques Lacan's désir follows Freud's concept of Wunsch and it is central to Lacanian theories. For the aim of the talking cure—psychoanalysis—is precisely to lead the analysis and or patient to uncover the truth about their desire, but this is only possible if that desire is articulated, or spoken. Lacan said that "it is only once it is formulated, named in the presence of the other, that desire appears in the full sense of the term." "That the subject should come to recognize and to name his/her desire, that is the efficacious action of analysis. But it is not a question of recognizing something which would be entirely given. In naming it, the subject creates, brings forth, a new presence in the world." "[W]hat is important is to teach the subject to name, to articulate, to bring desire into existence." Now, although the truth about desire is somehow present in discourse, discourse can never articulate the whole truth about desire: whenever discourse attempts to articulate desire, there is always a leftover, a surplus.

In The Signification of the Phallus Lacan distinguishes desire from need and demand. Need is a biological instinct that is articulated in demand, yet demand has a double function, on one hand it articulates need and on the other acts as a demand for love. So, even after the need articulated in demand is satisfied, the demand for love remains unsatisfied and this leftover is desire. For Lacan "desire is neither the appetite for satisfaction nor the demand for love, but the difference that results from the subtraction of the first from the second" (article cited). Desire then is the surplus produced by the articulation of need in demand. Lacan adds that "desire begins to take shape in the margin in which demand becomes separated from need." Hence desire can never be satisfied, or as Slavoj Žižek puts it "desire's raison d'être is not to realize its goal, to find full satisfaction, but to reproduce itself as desire."

It is also important to distinguish between desire and the drives. Even though they both belong to the field of the Other (as opposed to love), desire is one, whereas the drives are many. The drives are the partial manifestations of a single force called desire (see "The Four Fundamental Concepts of Psychoanalysis"). If one can surmise that objet petit a is the object of desire, it is not the object towards which desire tends, but the cause of desire. For desire is not a relation to an object but a relation to a lack (manque). Then desire appears as a social construct since it is always constituted in a dialectical relationship.

==== Deleuze and Guattari ====
French philosophers and critical theorists Gilles Deleuze and Félix Guattari's 1972 book Anti-Oedipus has been widely credited as a landmark work tackling philosophical and psychoanalytical conceptions of desire, and proposing a new theory of desire in the form of schizoanalysis. Deleuze and Guattari regard desire as a productive force, not as originating from lack like Lacan does.

== See also ==
- Desire
- Hedonism
- Passions (philosophy)
