= The Four Fundamental Concepts of Psychoanalysis =

1964 seminar by Jacques Lacan

- Cover of the first edition
- Editor: Jacques-Alain Miller
- Author: Jacques Lacan
- Original title: Les quatre concepts fondamentaux de la psychanalyse
- Translator: Alan Sheridan
- Illustrator: Jay J. Smith
- Cover artist: François Leclaire (photo)
- Language: French
- Series: Seminars of Jacques Lacan
- Subject: Psychoanalysis
- Publisher: Éditions du Seuil
- Publication date: 1973
- Publication place: France
- English publication date: 1978
- Media type: Print (Hardcover and Paperback)
- Pages: 290
- ISBN: 0-393-00079-6
- OCLC: 8106863
- Preceded by: Seminar X
- Followed by: Seminar XII

The Four Fundamental Concepts of Psychoanalysis is the 1978 English-language translation of a seminar held by Jacques Lacan. The original (French: Le séminaire. Livre XI. Les quatre concepts fondamentaux de la psychanalyse) was published in Paris by Le Seuil in 1973. The Seminar was held at the École Normale Supérieure in Paris between January and June 1964 and is the eleventh in the series of The Seminar of Jacques Lacan. The text was published by Jacques-Alain Miller.

In this seminar Lacan introduces the following 4 concepts as the fundamental concepts of psychoanalysis:

1. Unconscious
2. Repetition
3. Transference
4. Drive

== Background ==
In January 1963, Serge Leclaire succeeded Lacan as president of the S.F.P. (Societé Francaise de Psychanalyse). In May, envoys from the I.P.A (International Psychoanalytic Association) visited Paris and meet with Leclaire. Not only did they express doubts about Lacan's attitude towards Freud, but they also claimed that Lacan manipulates transference through the short session: he must be excluded from the training courses. At the Congress of Stockholm, in July, the I.P.A. votes an ultimatum: within three months Lacan's name has to be crossed off the list of didacticians. Two weeks before the expiration of the deadline fixed by the I.P.A. (October 31), a motion was called for Lacan's name to be removed from the list of training analysts. On November 19 a general meeting had to make a final decision on I.P.A.'s conditions regarding Lacan. Lacan then wrote a letter to Leclaire announcing he would not attend the meeting because he could foresee the disavowal. Thus, on November 19, the members' majority takes the position in favor of the ban. As a result, Lacan no longer is one of the didacticians. The next day, his seminar on "The Names-of-the-Father" was to start at Sainte-Anne: he announced its end. Fragments of it would be published in L'excommunication. Lacan then founded L'École Française de Psychanalyse that would become L'École Freudienne de Paris (E.F.P.): "I hereby found the École Française de Psychanalyse, by myself, as alone as I have ever been in my relation to the psychoanalytic cause."

In early 1964, with Claude Lévi-Strauss and Fernand Braudel's support, he was appointed lecturer at the École Pratique des Hautes Etudes. He begins his new seminar on "The Four Fundamental Concepts of Psychoanalysis" on January 15 in the Dussane room at the École Normale Supérieure.

== Contents ==
Lacan talks about the censorship of his teachings and his excommunication from official psychoanalytical circles. He wants to train analysts and, at the same time, address the non-analyst by raising the following questions: Is psychoanalysis a science? If so, under what conditions? If it is – the "science of the unconscious" or a "conjectural science of the subject" – what can it teach us about science?

Lacan sought in his eleventh Seminar to cover what he called "the major Freudian concepts – I have isolated four that seem to come within this category...the first two, the Unconscious and Repetition. The Transference – I hope to approach it next time -...and lastly, the Drive." Praxis thus, which "places the subject in a position of dealing with the real through the symbolic," produces concepts, of which four are offered here: the Unconscious, Repetition, Transference and the Drive.

The 1973 title, Les quatre concepts fondamentaux de la psychanalyse, has often been contested in favor of the 1964's: Les fondements de la psychanalyse, which implies neither that it is a matter of concepts, nor that there are only four of them. Lacan is suspicious of the rapport between psychoanalysis, religion and science. Did they not have a founding father and quasi-secret texts? Freud was "legitimately the subject presumed to know," at least as to the unconscious: "He was not only the subject who was presumed to know, he knew." "He gave us this knowledge in terms that may be said to be indestructible." "No progress has been made that has not deviated whenever one of the terms has been neglected around which Freud ordered the ways that he traced and the paths of the unconscious." This declaration of allegiance contrasts with the study of Freud's dream about the dead son screaming "Father, can't you see I'm burning?" The main problem remains that of transference: the Name-of-the-Father is a foundation, but the legacy of the Father is sin, and the original sin of psychoanalysis is Freud's desire that was not analyzed. In "The Freudian thing", Lacan presents the Name-of-the-Father as a treasure to be found, provided it implies self-immolation as a sacrificial victim to truth.

Of the four concepts mentioned, three were developed between 1953 and 1963. As to drives, whose importance has increased since the study of objet a in the 1963 Seminar L'angoisse, Lacan considers them as different from biological needs in that they can never be satisfied. The purpose of the drive is not to reach a goal (a final destination) but to follow its aim (the way itself), which is to circle round the object. The real source of jouissance is the repetitive movement of this closed circuit. Freud defined Trieb as a montage of four discontinuous elements: "Drive is not thrust (Drang); in "Instincts and Their Vicissitudes" Freud distinguishes four terms in the drive: Drang, thrust; Quelle, the source; Objekt, the object; Ziel, the aim. Such a list may seem quite natural; my purpose is to prove that the text was written to show that it is not as natural as that." The drive is a thoroughly cultural and symbolic construct. Lacan integrates the aforementioned elements into the drive's circuit, which originates in an erogenous zone, circles the object and returns to the erogenous zone. This circuit is structured by the three grammatical voices:

1. the active (to see)
2. the reflexive (to see oneself)
3. the passive (to make oneself be seen).

The first two are autoerotic; only in the passive voice a new subject appears, "this subject, the other, appears in so far as the drive has been able to show its circular course." The drive is always active, which is why he writes the third instance as "to make oneself be seen" instead of "to be seen."

Lacan rejects the notion that partial drives can attain any complete organization since the primacy of the genital zone is always precarious. The drives are partial, not in the sense that they are a part of a whole (a genital drive), but in that they only represent sexuality partially: they convey the dimension of jouissance. "The reality of the unconscious is sexual reality – an untenable truth," much as it cannot be separated from death. Objet petit a is something from which the subject, in order to constitute itself, has separated itself off as organ. This serves as symbol of the lack, of the phallus, not as such, but in so far as it is lacking. It must be an object that is separable and that has some rapport to the lack. At the oral level, it is the nothing; at the anal level, it is the locus of the metaphor – one object for another, give the feces in place of the phallus – the anal drive is the domain of the gift; at the scopic level, we are no longer at the level of demand, but of desire, of the desire of the Other; it is the same at the level of the invocatory drive, which is the closest to the experience of the unconscious." The first two relate to demand, the second pair to desire. Under the form of objet a, Lacan groups all the partial drives linked to part objects: the breast, feces, the penis, and he adds the gaze and the voice. Here, he asserts the split between the eye and the gaze when he analyzes Holbein's painting The Ambassadors as a "trap for the gaze" (piège à regards), but also as a dompte-regard (the gaze is tamed by an object) and a trompe-l'oeil. In the foreground, a floating object, a phallic ghost object gives presence to the – Φ of castration. This object is the heart of the organization of desire through the framework of the drives.

In "La Lettre volée", The Purloined Letter, Lacan states that "the unconscious is the discourse of the Other," meaning that "one should see in the unconscious the effects of speech on the subject." The unconscious is the effect of the signifier on the subject – the signifier is what gets repressed and what returns in the formations of the unconscious. How then is it possible to reconcile desire linked to the signifier and to the Other with the libido, now an organ under the shape of the "lamella," the placenta, the part of the body from which the subject must separate in order to exist? A new conception of repetition comes into play, whose functioning stems from two forces: automatism on the side of the signifier and the missed yet desired encounter on the side of the drive, where objet a refers to the "impossible" Real (that as such cannot be assimilated). If transference is the enactment (la mise en acte) of the reality of the unconscious – what Lacan's deconstruction of the drive wants to bring to light – if desire is the nodal point where the motion of the unconscious, an untenable sexual reality, is also at work, what is to be done? The analyst's role is to allow the drive "to be made present in the reality of the unconscious": he must fall from the idealized position so as to become the upholder of objet a, the separating object.

The appearance during its course of what he called 'the newly published, posthumous work of my friend Maurice Merleau-Ponty, Le Visible et l'invisible" led Lacan however – "free as I am to pursue...the way that seems best to me" – into a long detour midway upon "the eye and the gaze – this is for us the split in which the drive is manifested at the level of the scopic field."

The French edition contained Lacan's 1965 "Report" on the Seminar" and a "Postface" penned in 1973 on the occasion of the French publication. Both were omitted from the 1977 English-language translation in favour of a specially written "Preface". The original "Report" and "Postface" can be consulted in English.

== Editions ==
- Seminar on The Purloined Letter, Écrits, transl. by Jeffrey Mehlman, "French Freud" in Yale French Studies 48, 1972.

== See also ==
- Seminars of Jacques Lacan
- Gaze
- Psychoanalytic theory
