= Objet petit a =

Concept in Lacanian psychoanalysis

In the psychoanalytic theory of Jacques Lacan, objet petit a (French for "object little a"; "a" for "autre", i.e. other) stands for the unattainable object of desire, a projection or reflection of the ego made to symbolise otherness, like a specular image, as opposed to the big Other (written as capitalised "A") which represents otherness itself. It is sometimes called the object cause of desire, as it is the force that induces desire towards any particular object. According to Alan Sheridan's note to his translation of Écrits: A Selection, Lacan always insisted that the term should remain untranslated, "thus acquiring, as it were, the status of an algebraic sign".

== Origins ==
Jacques-Alain Miller, Lacan's protégé, traces the idea back to Sigmund Freud's Three Essays on the Theory of Sexuality, out of which Karl Abraham develops the notion of the "part-object", a concept further developed by his student, Melanie Klein, which in turn inspired Donald Winnicott's idea of the "transitional object".

== Lacanian development ==
The objet petit a is what falls from the subject in anxiety.

— Lacan

Mary Jacobus writes 'In Lacan's seminars of the late 1950s and early 1960s, the evolving concept of the objet (petit) a is viewed in the matheme of phantasy as the object of desire sought in the other...a deliberate departure from British Object Relations psychoanalysis'.

In 1957, in his Seminar Les formations de l'inconscient, Lacan introduces the concept of objet petit a as the (Kleinian) imaginary part-object, an element which is imagined as separable from the rest of the body. In the Seminar Le transfert (1960–1961) he articulates objet a with the term agalma (Greek, an ornament). Just as the agalma is a precious object hidden in a worthless box, so objet petit a is the object of desire which we seek in the Other. The "box" can take many forms, all of which are unimportant, the importance lies in what is "inside" the box, the cause of desire.

In the Seminars L'angoisse (1962–1963) and The Four Fundamental Concepts of Psychoanalysis (1964), objet petit a is defined as the leftover, the remnant left behind by the introduction of the Symbolic in the Real. This is further elaborated in the Seminar The Other Side of Psychoanalysis (1969–1970), where Lacan elaborates his Four discourses. In the discourse of the Master, one signifier attempts to represent the subject for all other signifiers, but a surplus is always produced: this surplus is objet petit a, a surplus meaning, a surplus of jouissance.

=== Hierarchy of object (a) ===
The object a is the form which lack assumes when it is represented. In truth, the object of desire is merely lack, void, which must be lacking in both the imaginary and the symbolic: which is to say, the real: ' a is of the order of the real' (SXII: 5/1/66).

— Michael Lewis citing Lacan

Speaking of the "fall" of the a, Lacan noted that 'the diversity of forms taken by that object of the fall ought to be related to the manner in which the desire of the Other is apprehended by the subject.' The earliest form is 'something that is called the breast...this breast in its function as object, object a cause of desire.'

Next there emerges 'the second form: the anal object. We know it by way of the phenomenology of the gift, the present offered in anxiety.' The third form appears 'at the level of the genital act...[where] Freudian teaching, and the tradition that has maintained it, situates for us the gaping chasm of castration.'

Lacan also identified 'the function of petit a at the level of the scopophilic drive. Its essence is realized in so far as, more than elsewhere, the subject is captive of the function of desire.' The final term relates to 'the petit a source of the superego...the fifth term of the function of petit a, through which will be revealed the gamut of the object in its – pregenital – relation to the demand of the – post-genital – Other.'

=== Analyst and the a ===
For transference to take place, the analyst must incorporate the a for the analysand: 'analysts who are such only insofar as they are object – the object of the analysand'. For Lacan, 'it is not enough that the analyst should support the function of Tiresias. He must also, as Apollinaire tells us, have breasts' – must represent or incorporate the (missing) object of desire.

Working through the transference thereafter entails moving 'beyond the function of the a': the 'analyst has to...be the support of the separating a,' so as to allow the analysis eventually to be completed. 'If the analyst during the analysis will come to be this object, he will also at the end of analysis not be it. He will submit himself to the fate of any object that stands in for a, and that is to be discarded.'

== Popular culture ==
Slavoj Žižek explains the objet petit a in relation to the MacGuffin in the films of Alfred Hitchcock: "The McGuffin is clearly the objet petit a, a gap in the centre of the symbolic order – the lack, the void of the Real setting in motion the symbolic movement of interpretation, a pure semblance of the Mystery to be explained, interpreted." In the 1996 documentary Love thy symptom as thyself, Žižek argues that Lacan's principle was illustrated by a crude television advert in which a woman kisses a frog, turning it into a handsome man (echoing The Frog Prince fairy tale), at which point the man then kisses the woman, who turns into a bottle of beer (his "true" object of desire, and the subject of the advert). Humorously, Zizek suggests: "Maybe the ideal couple would be the frog embracing the bottle of beer."
