= Jacques Lacan =

French psychoanalyst and writer (1901–1981)

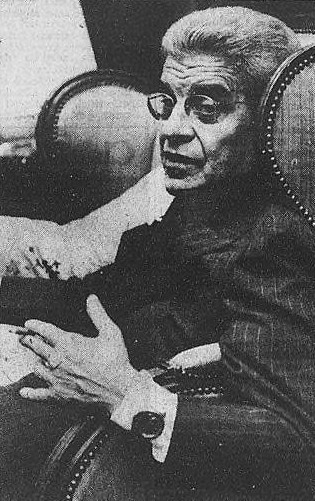
- Lacan in 1969
- Born: Jacques Marie Émile Lacan; 13 April 1901; Paris, France
- Died: 9 September 1981 (aged 80); Paris, France
- Spouse(s): Marie-Louise Blondin (m. 1934; div. 1941) Sylvia Bataille (m. 1953; died 1981)
- Children: 4, including Judith
- Relatives: Laurence Bataille (stepdaughter); Jacques-Alain Miller (son-in-law)

Education
- Education: University of Paris (SpDip, 1931; MD, 1932); École nationale des langues orientales vivantes (Dip, 1945)
- Thesis: De la psychose paranoïaque dans ses rapports avec la personnalite (1932)
- Doctoral advisor: Henri Claude

Philosophical work
- Era: 20th-century philosophy
- Region: Western philosophy
- School: Psychoanalysis; Structuralism; Post-structuralism
- Institutions: EPHE; University of Paris VIII
- Notable students: Jean-Claude Milner
- Main interests: Psychoanalysis, semiotics
- Notable ideas: Mirror phase The Real; The Symbolic; The Imaginary; Graph of desire Split subject Objet petit a

Jacques Marie Émile Lacan (UK: /læˈkɒ̃/, US: /ləˈkɑːn/ lə-KAHN; French: [ʒak maʁi emil lakɑ̃]; 13 April 1901 – 9 September 1981) was a French psychoanalyst and psychiatrist. Described as "the most controversial psycho-analyst since Freud", Lacan gave annual seminars in Paris from 1952 to 1980 and published papers that were later collected in the book Écrits. Transcriptions of the seminars 1953–1980 were published. His work made a significant impact on continental philosophy and cultural theory in areas such as post-structuralism, critical theory, feminist theory and film theory, as well as on the practice of psychoanalysis itself.

Lacan discussed the whole range of Freudian concepts, emphasizing the philosophical dimension of Freud's thought and applying concepts derived from structuralism in linguistics and anthropology to his own work, which he augmented with predicate logic and topology. Taking this new direction, and introducing controversial innovations in clinical practice, led to expulsion for Lacan and his followers from the International Psychoanalytic Association. In consequence, Lacan went on to establish new psychoanalytic institutions to promote and develop his work, which he declared to be a "return to Freud", in opposition to prevalent trends in psychology and institutional psychoanalysis which adapted Freud's ideas to social norms.

== Biography ==
=== Early life ===
Lacan was born in Paris, the eldest of Émilie and Alfred Lacan's three children. His father was a successful soap and oils salesman. His mother was ardently Catholic – his younger brother entered a monastery in 1929. Lacan attended the Catholic Collège Stanislas de Paris between 1907 and 1918. An interest in philosophy led him to a preoccupation with the work of Spinoza, one outcome of which was his abandonment of religious faith for atheism. There were tensions in the family around this issue, and he regretted not persuading his brother to take a different path, but by 1924 his parents had moved to Boulogne and he was living in rooms in Montmartre.

During the early 1920s, Lacan actively engaged with the Parisian literary and artistic avant-garde. Having met James Joyce, he was present at the Parisian bookshop where the first readings of passages from Ulysses in French and English took place, shortly before it was published in 1922. He also had meetings with Charles Maurras, whom he admired as a literary stylist, and he occasionally attended meetings of Action Française (of which Maurras was a leading ideologue), of which he would later be highly critical.

In 1920, after being rejected for military service on the grounds that he was too thin, Lacan entered medical school. Between 1927 and 1931, after completing his studies at the faculty of medicine of the University of Paris, he specialised in psychiatry under the direction of Henri Claude at the Sainte-Anne Hospital, the major psychiatric hospital serving central Paris, at the Infirmary for the Insane of the Police Prefecture under Gaëtan Gatian de Clérambault and also at the Hospital Henri-Rousselle.

=== 1930s ===
Lacan was involved with the Parisian surrealist movement of the 1930s, associating with André Breton, Georges Bataille, Salvador Dalí, and Pablo Picasso. For a time, he served as Picasso's personal therapist. He attended the mouvement Psyché that Maryse Choisy founded and published in the Surrealist journal Minotaure. "[Lacan's] interest in surrealism predated his interest in psychoanalysis," former Lacanian analyst and biographer Dylan Evans explains, speculating that "perhaps Lacan never really abandoned his early surrealist sympathies, its neo-Romantic view of madness as 'convulsive beauty', its celebration of irrationality." Translator and historian David Macey writes that "the importance of surrealism can hardly be over-stated... to the young Lacan... [who] also shared the surrealists' taste for scandal and provocation, and viewed provocation as an important element in psycho-analysis itself".

In 1931, after a second year at the Sainte-Anne Hospital, Lacan was awarded his Diplôme de médecin légiste (a medical examiner's qualification) and became a licensed forensic psychiatrist. The following year he was awarded his Diplôme d'État de docteur en médecine (roughly equivalent to an MD degree) for his thesis "On Paranoiac Psychosis in its Relations to the Personality" ("De la Psychose paranoïaque dans ses rapports avec la personnalité"). (Note: The thesis was published in Paris by Librairie E. Francois (1932); reprinted in Paris by Éditions du Seuil (1975)) Its publication had little immediate impact on French psychoanalysis but it did meet with acclaim amongst Lacan's circle of surrealist writers and artists. In their only recorded instance of direct communication, Lacan sent a copy of his thesis to Sigmund Freud who acknowledged its receipt with a postcard.

Lacan's thesis was based on observations of several patients with a primary focus on one female patient whom he called Aimée. Its exhaustive reconstruction of her family history and social relations, on which he based his analysis of her paranoid state of mind, demonstrated his dissatisfaction with traditional psychiatry and the growing influence of Freud on his ideas. Also in 1932, Lacan published a translation of Freud's 1922 text "Über einige neurotische Mechanismen bei Eifersucht, Paranoia und Homosexualität" ("Some Neurotic Mechanisms in Jealousy, Paranoia and Homosexuality") as "De quelques mécanismes névrotiques dans la jalousie, la paranoïa et l'homosexualité" in the Revue française de psychanalyse. In Autumn 1932, Lacan began his training analysis with Rudolph Loewenstein, which was to last until 1938.

In 1934 Lacan became a candidate member of the Société psychanalytique de Paris (SPP). He began his private psychoanalytic practice in 1936 whilst still seeing patients at the Sainte-Anne Hospital, and the same year presented his first analytic report at the Congress of the International Psychoanalytical Association (IPA) in Marienbad on the "Mirror Phase". The congress chairman, Ernest Jones, terminated the lecture before its conclusion, since he was unwilling to extend Lacan's stated presentation time. Insulted, Lacan left the congress to witness the Berlin Olympic Games. No copy of the original lecture remains, Lacan having decided not to hand in his text for publication in the conference proceedings.

Lacan's attendance at Kojève's lectures on Hegel, given between 1933 and 1939, and which focused on the Phenomenology and the master-slave dialectic in particular, was formative for his subsequent work, initially in his formulation of his theory of the mirror phase, for which he was also indebted to the experimental work on child development of Henri Wallon.

It was Wallon who commissioned from Lacan the last major text of his pre-war period, a contribution to the 1938 Encyclopédie française entitled "La Famille" (reprinted in 1984 as "Les Complexes familiaux dans la formation de l'individu", Paris: Navarin). 1938 was also the year of Lacan's accession to full membership (membre titulaire) of the SPP, notwithstanding considerable opposition from many of its senior members who were unimpressed by his recasting of Freudian theory in philosophical terms.

Lacan married Marie-Louise Blondin in January 1934 and in January 1937 they had the first of their three children, a daughter named Caroline. A son, Thibaut, was born in August 1939 and a daughter, Sibylle, in November 1940.

=== 1940s ===
The SPP was disbanded due to Nazi Germany's occupation of France in 1940. Lacan was called up for military service which he undertook in periods of duty at the Val-de-Grâce military hospital in Paris, whilst at the same time continuing his private psychoanalytic practice. In 1942 he moved into apartments at 5 rue de Lille, which he would occupy until his death. During the war he did not publish any work, turning instead to a study of Chinese for which he obtained a degree from the École nationale des langues orientales vivantes (ENLOV).

In a relationship they formed before the war, Sylvia Bataille (née Maklès), the estranged wife of his friend Georges Bataille, became Lacan's mistress and, in 1953, his second wife. During the war their relationship was complicated by the threat of deportation for Sylvia, who was Jewish, since this required her to live in the unoccupied territories. Lacan intervened personally with the authorities to obtain papers detailing her family origins, which he destroyed. In 1941 they had a child, Judith. She kept the name Bataille because Lacan wished to delay the announcement of his divorce until after the war.

After the war, the SPP recommenced their meetings. In 1945 Lacan visited England for a five-week study trip, where he met the British analysts Ernest Jones, Wilfred Bion and John Rickman. Bion's analytic work with groups influenced Lacan, contributing to his own subsequent emphasis on study groups as a structure within which to advance theoretical work in psychoanalysis. He published a report of his visit as 'La Psychiatrique anglaise et la guerre' (Evolution psychiatrique 1, 1947, pp. 293–318).

In 1949, Lacan presented a new paper on the mirror stage, 'The Mirror-Stage, as Formative of the I, as Revealed in Psychoanalytic Experience', to the sixteenth IPA congress in Zurich. The same year he set out in the Doctrine de la Commission de l'Enseignement, produced for the Training Commission of the SPP, the protocols for the training of candidates.

=== 1950s ===
With the purchase in 1951 of a country mansion at Guitrancourt, Lacan established a base for weekend retreats for work, leisure—including extravagant social occasions—and for the accommodation of his vast library. His art collection included Courbet's L'Origine du monde, which he had concealed in his study by a removable wooden screen on which an abstract representation of the Courbet by the artist André Masson was portrayed.

In 1951, Lacan started to hold private weekly meetings in Paris in which he inaugurated what he described as "a return to Freud," whose doctrines were to be re-articulated through a reading of Saussure's linguistics and Levi-Strauss's structuralist anthropology. In 1952, these meetings became a private seminar at the Sainte-Anne Hospital where Lacan worked as a consultant psychiatrist. Becoming public in 1953, Lacan's 27-year-long seminar was highly influential in Parisian cultural life, as well as in psychoanalytic theory and clinical practice. Transcriptions of these seminars were published as The Seminar of Jacques Lacan.

In January 1953 Lacan was elected president of the SPP. When, at a meeting the following June, a formal motion was passed against him criticising his abandonment of the standard analytic training session for the variable-length session, he immediately resigned his presidency. He and a number of colleagues then resigned from the SPP to form the Société Française de Psychanalyse (SFP). One consequence of this was to eventually deprive the new group of membership of the International Psychoanalytical Association.

Encouraged by the reception of "the return to Freud" and of his report "The Function and Field of Speech and Language in Psychoanalysis," Lacan began to re-read Freud's works in relation to contemporary philosophy, linguistics, ethnology, biology, and topology. From 1953 to 1964 at the Sainte-Anne Hospital, he held his Seminars and presented case histories of patients. During this period he wrote the texts that are found in the collection Écrits, which was first published in 1966. In his seventh seminar "The Ethics of Psychoanalysis" (1959–60), which according to Lewis A. Kirshner "arguably represents the most far-reaching attempt to derive a comprehensive ethical position from psychoanalysis," Lacan defined the ethical foundations of psychoanalysis and presented his "ethics for our time"—one that would, in the words of Freud, prove to be equal to the tragedy of modern man and to the "discontent of civilization." At the roots of the ethics is desire: the only promise of analysis is austere, it is the entrance-into-the-I (in French a play on words between l'entrée en je and l'entrée en jeu). "I must come to the place where the id was," where the analysand discovers, in its absolute nakedness, the truth of his desire. The end of psychoanalysis entails "the purification of desire." He defended three assertions: that psychoanalysis must have a scientific status; that Freudian ideas have radically changed the concepts of subject, of knowledge, and of desire; and that the analytic field is the only place from which it is possible to question the insufficiencies of science and philosophy.

=== 1960s ===
Starting in 1962, a complex negotiation took place to determine the status of the SFP within the IPA. Lacan's practice (with its controversial indeterminate-length sessions) and his critical stance towards psychoanalytic orthodoxy led, in August 1963, to the IPA setting the condition that registration of the SFP was dependent upon the removal of Lacan from the list of SFP analysts. With the SFP's decision to honour this request in November 1963, Lacan had effectively been stripped of the right to conduct training analyses and thus was constrained to form his own institution in order to accommodate the many candidates who desired to continue their analyses with him. This he did, on 21 June 1964, in the "Founding Act" of what became known as the École Freudienne de Paris (EFP), taking "many representatives of the third generation with him: among them were Maud and Octave Mannoni, Serge Leclaire ... and Jean Clavreul".

With the support of Claude Lévi-Strauss and Louis Althusser, Lacan was appointed lecturer at the École Pratique des Hautes Études (EPHE). He started with a seminar on The Four Fundamental Concepts of Psychoanalysis in January 1964 in the Dussane room at the École Normale Supérieure. Lacan began to set forth his own approach to psychoanalysis to an audience of colleagues that had joined him from the SFP. His lectures also attracted many of the École Normale's students. He divided the École Freudienne de Paris into three sections: the section of pure psychoanalysis (training and elaboration of the theory, where members who have been analyzed but have not become analysts can participate); the section for applied psychoanalysis (therapeutic and clinical, physicians who either have not started or have not yet completed analysis are welcome); and the section for taking inventory of the Freudian field (concerning the critique of psychoanalytic literature and the analysis of the theoretical relations with related or affiliated sciences). In 1967 he invented the procedure of the Pass, which was added to the statutes after being voted in by the members of the EFP the following year.

1966 saw the publication of Lacan's collected writings, the Écrits, compiled with an index of concepts by Jacques-Alain Miller. Printed by the prestigious publishing house Éditions du Seuil, the Écrits did much to establish Lacan's reputation to a wider public. The success of the publication led to a subsequent two-volume edition in 1969.

By the 1960s, Lacan was associated, at least in the public mind, with the far left in France. In May 1968, Lacan voiced his sympathy for the student protests and as a corollary his followers set up a Department of Psychology at the University of Vincennes (Paris VIII). However, Lacan's unequivocal comments in 1971 on revolutionary ideals in politics draw a sharp line between the actions of some of his followers and his own style of "revolt".

In 1969, Lacan moved his public seminars to the Faculté de Droit (Panthéon), where he continued to deliver his expositions of analytic theory and practice until the dissolution of his school in 1980.

=== 1970s ===
Throughout the final decade of his life, Lacan continued his widely followed seminars. During this period, he developed his concepts of masculine and feminine jouissance and placed an increased emphasis on the concept of "the Real" as a point of impossible contradiction in the "symbolic order". Lacan continued to draw widely on various disciplines, working closely on classical Chinese literature with François Cheng and on the life and work of James Joyce with Jacques Aubert. The growing success of the Écrits, which was translated (in abridged form) into German and English, led to invitations to lecture in Italy, Japan and the United States. He gave lectures in 1975 at Yale, Columbia and MIT.

=== Last years ===
Lacan's failing health made it difficult for him to meet the demands of the year-long Seminars he had been delivering since the 1950s, but his teaching continued into the first year of the 1980s. After dissolving his School, the EFP, in January 1980, Lacan travelled to Caracas to found the Freudian Field Institute on 12 July.

The Overture to the Caracas Encounter was to be Lacan's final public address. His last texts from the spring of 1981 are brief institutional documents pertaining to the newly formed Freudian Field Institute.

Lacan died on 9 September 1981.

== Major concepts ==
=== Return to Freud ===
Lacan's "return to Freud" emphasizes a renewed attention to the original texts of Freud, and included a radical critique of ego psychology, whereas "Lacan's quarrel with Object Relations psychoanalysis" was a more muted affair. Here he attempted "to restore to the notion of the Object Relation... the capital of experience that legitimately belongs to it", building upon what he termed "the hesitant, but controlled work of Melanie Klein... Through her we know the function of the imaginary primordial enclosure formed by the imago of the mother's body", as well as upon "the notion of the transitional object, introduced by D. W. Winnicott... a key-point for the explanation of the genesis of fetishism". Nevertheless, "Lacan systematically questioned those psychoanalytic developments from the 1930s to the 1970s, which were increasingly and almost exclusively focused on the child's early relations with the mother... the pre-Oedipal or Kleinian mother"; and Lacan's rereading of Freud—"characteristically, Lacan insists that his return to Freud supplies the only valid model"—formed a basic conceptual starting-point in that oppositional strategy.

Lacan thought that Freud's ideas of "slips of the tongue", jokes, and the interpretation of dreams all emphasized the agency of language in subjects' own constitution of themselves. In "The Instance of the Letter in the Unconscious, or Reason Since Freud," he proposes that "the psychoanalytic experience discovers in the unconscious the whole structure of language". The unconscious is not a primitive or archetypal part of the mind separate from the conscious, linguistic ego, he explained, but rather a formation as complex and structurally sophisticated as consciousness itself. Lacan is associated with the idea that "the unconscious is structured like a language", but the first time this sentence occurs in his work, he clarifies that he means that both the unconscious and language are structured, not that they share a single structure; and that the structure of language is such that the subject cannot necessarily be equated with the speaker. This results in the self being denied any point of reference to which to be "restored" following trauma or a crisis of identity.

André Green objected that "when you read Freud, it is obvious that this proposition doesn't work for a minute. Freud very clearly opposes the unconscious (which he says is constituted by thing-presentations and nothing else) to the pre-conscious. What is related to language can only belong to the pre-conscious". Freud certainly contrasted "the presentation of the word and the presentation of the thing... the unconscious presentation is the presentation of the thing alone" in his metapsychology. Dylan Evans, however, in his Dictionary of Lacanian Psychoanalysis, "... takes issue with those who, like André Green, question the linguistic aspect of the unconscious, emphasizing Lacan's distinction between das Ding and die Sache in Freud's account of thing-presentation". Green's criticism of Lacan also included accusations of intellectual dishonesty, he said, "[He] cheated everybody... the return to Freud was an excuse, it just meant going to Lacan."

=== Mirror stage ===
Lacan's first official contribution to psychoanalysis was the mirror stage, which he described as "formative of the function of the 'I' as revealed in psychoanalytic experience." By the early 1950s, he came to regard the mirror stage as more than a moment in the life of the infant; instead, it formed part of the permanent structure of subjectivity. In the "imaginary order", the subject's own image permanently catches and captivates the subject. Lacan explains that "the mirror stage is a phenomenon to which I assign a twofold value. In the first place, it has historical value as it marks a decisive turning-point in the mental development of the child. In the second place, it typifies an essential libidinal relationship with the body-image".

As this concept developed further, the stress fell less on its historical value and more on its structural value. In his fourth seminar, "La relation d'objet," Lacan states that "the mirror stage is far from a mere phenomenon which occurs in the development of the child. It illustrates the conflictual nature of the dual relationship. "

The mirror stage describes the formation of the ego via the process of objectification, the ego being the result of a conflict between one's perceived visual appearance and one's emotional experience. This identification is what Lacan called "alienation". At six months, the baby still lacks physical co-ordination. The child is able to recognize itself in a mirror prior to the attainment of control over their bodily movements. The child sees its image as a whole and the synthesis of this image produces a sense of contrast with the lack of co-ordination of the body, which is perceived as a fragmented body. The child experiences this contrast initially as a rivalry with its image, because the wholeness of the image threatens the child with fragmentation—thus the mirror stage gives rise to an aggressive tension between the subject and the image. To resolve this aggressive tension, the child identifies with the image: this primary identification with the counterpart forms the ego. Lacan understood this moment of identification as a moment of jubilation, since it leads to an imaginary sense of mastery; yet when the child compares its own precarious sense of mastery with the omnipotence of the mother, a depressive reaction may accompany the jubilation.

Lacan calls the specular image "orthopaedic," since it leads the child to anticipate the overcoming of its "real specific prematurity of birth." The vision of the body as integrated and contained, in opposition to the child's actual experience of motor incapacity and the sense of his or her body as fragmented, induces a movement from "insufficiency to anticipation." In other words, the mirror image initiates and then aids, like a crutch, the process of the formation of an integrated sense of self.

In the mirror stage a "misunderstanding" (méconnaissance) constitutes the ego—the "me" (moi) becomes alienated from itself through the introduction of an imaginary dimension to the subject. The mirror stage also has a significant symbolic dimension, due to the presence of the figure of the adult who carries the infant. Having jubilantly assumed the image as their own, the child turns their head towards this adult, who represents the big other, as if to call on the adult to ratify this image.

=== Other ===
While Freud uses the term "other", referring to der Andere (the other person) and das Andere (otherness), Lacan (influenced by the seminar of Alexandre Kojève) theorizes alterity in a manner more closely resembling Hegel's philosophy.

Lacan often used an algebraic symbology for his concepts: the big other (l'Autre) is designated A, and the little other (l'autre) is designated a. He asserts that an awareness of this distinction is fundamental to analytic practice: "the analyst must be imbued with the difference between A and a, so he can situate himself in the place of Other, and not the other". Dylan Evans explains that:

- The little other is the other who is not really other, but a reflection and projection of the ego. Evans adds that for this reason the symbol a can represent both the little other and the ego in the schema L. It is simultaneously the counterpart and the specular image. The little other is thus entirely inscribed in the imaginary order.
- The big other designates radical alterity, an other-ness which transcends the illusory otherness of the imaginary because it cannot be assimilated through identification. Lacan equates this radical alterity with language and the law, and hence the big other is inscribed in the order of the symbolic. Indeed, the big other is the symbolic insofar as it is particularized for each subject. The other is thus both another subject, in its radical alterity and unassimilable uniqueness, and also the symbolic order which mediates the relationship with that other subject."

For Lacan "the Other must first of all be considered a locus in which speech is constituted," so that the other as another subject is secondary to the other as symbolic order. We can speak of the other as a subject in a secondary sense only when a subject occupies this position and thereby embodies the other for another subject.

In arguing that speech originates in neither the ego nor in the subject but rather in the other, Lacan stresses that speech and language are beyond the subject's conscious control. They come from another place, outside of consciousness—"the unconscious is the discourse of the Other". When conceiving the other as a place, Lacan refers to Freud's concept of psychical locality, in which the unconscious is described as "the other scene".

"It is the mother who first occupies the position of the big Other for the child", Dylan Evans explains, "it is she who receives the child's primitive cries and retroactively sanctions them as a particular message". The castration complex is formed when the child discovers that this other is not complete because there is a "lack (manque)" in the other. This means that there is always a signifier missing from the trove of signifiers constituted by the other. Lacan illustrates this incomplete other graphically by striking a bar through the symbol A; hence another name for the castrated, incomplete other is the "barred other".

=== Phallus ===
Feminist thinkers have both utilised and criticised Lacan's concepts of castration and the phallus. Feminists such as Avital Ronell, Jane Gallop, and Elizabeth Grosz, have interpreted Lacan's work as opening up new possibilities for feminist theory.

Some feminists have argued that Lacan's phallocentric analysis provides a useful means of understanding gender biases and imposed roles, while others, most notably Luce Irigaray, accuse Lacan of maintaining the sexist tradition in psychoanalysis. For Irigaray, the phallus does not define a single axis of gender by its presence or absence; instead, gender has two positive poles. Like Irigaray, French philosopher Jacques Derrida, in criticizing Lacan's concept of castration, discusses the phallus in a chiasmus with the hymen, as both one and other.

=== Three orders (plus one) ===
Lacan considered psychic functions to occur within a universal matrix. The Real, Imaginary and Symbolic are properties of this matrix, which make up part of every psychic function. This is not analogous to Freud's concept of id, ego and superego since in Freud's model certain functions take place within components of the psyche while Lacan thought that all three orders were part of every function. Lacan refined the concept of the orders over decades, resulting in inconsistencies in his writings. He eventually added a fourth component, the sinthome.

==== The Imaginary ====
The Imaginary is the field of images and imagination. The main illusions of this order are synthesis, autonomy, duality, and resemblance. Lacan thought that the relationship created within the mirror stage between the ego and the reflected image means that the ego and the Imaginary order itself are places of radical alienation: "alienation is constitutive of the Imaginary order". This relationship is also narcissistic.

In The Four Fundamental Concepts of Psychoanalysis, Lacan argues that the Symbolic order structures the visual field of the Imaginary, which means that it involves a linguistic dimension. If the signifier is the foundation of the symbolic, the signified and signification are part of the Imaginary order. Language has symbolic and Imaginary connotations—in its Imaginary aspect, language is the "wall of language" that inverts and distorts the discourse of the Other. The Imaginary, however, is rooted in the subject's relationship with his or her own body (the image of the body). In Fetishism: the Symbolic, the Imaginary and the Real, Lacan argues that in the sexual plane the Imaginary appears as sexual display and courtship love.

Insofar as identification with the analyst is the objective of analysis, Lacan accused major psychoanalytic schools of reducing the practice of psychoanalysis to the Imaginary order. Instead, Lacan proposes the use of the symbolic to dislodge the disabling fixations of the Imaginary—the analyst transforms the images into words. "The use of the Symbolic", he argued, "is the only way for the analytic process to cross the plane of identification."

==== The Symbolic ====
In his Seminar IV, "La relation d'objet", Lacan argues that the concepts of "Law" and "Structure" are unthinkable without language—thus the Symbolic is a linguistic dimension. This order is not equivalent to language, however, since language involves the Imaginary and the Real as well. The dimension proper to language in the Symbolic is that of the signifier—that is, a dimension in which elements have no positive existence, but which are constituted by virtue of their mutual differences.

The Symbolic is also the field of radical alterity—that is, the Other; the unconscious is the discourse of this Other. It is the realm of the Law that regulates desire in the Oedipus complex. The Symbolic is the domain of culture as opposed to the Imaginary order of nature. As important elements in the Symbolic, the concepts of death and lack (manque) connive to make of the pleasure principle the regulator of the distance from the Thing (in German, "das Ding an sich") and the death drive that goes "beyond the pleasure principle by means of repetition"—"the death drive is only a mask of the Symbolic order".

By working in the Symbolic order, the analyst is able to produce changes in the subjective position of the person undergoing psychoanalysis. These changes will produce imaginary effects because the Imaginary is structured by the Symbolic.

==== The Real ====
Lacan's concept of the Real dates back to 1936 and his doctoral thesis on psychosis. It was a term that was popular at the time, particularly with Émile Meyerson, who referred to it as "an ontological absolute, a true being-in-itself". Lacan returned to the theme of the Real in 1953 and continued to develop it until his death. The Real, for Lacan, is not synonymous with reality. Not only opposed to the Imaginary, the Real is also exterior to the Symbolic. Unlike the latter, which is constituted in terms of oppositions (i.e. presence/absence), "there is no absence in the Real". Whereas the Symbolic opposition "presence/absence" implies the possibility that something may be missing from the Symbolic, "the Real is always in its place". If the Symbolic is a set of differentiated elements (signifiers), the Real in itself is undifferentiated—it bears no fissure. The Symbolic introduces "a cut in the real" in the process of signification: "it is the world of words that creates the world of things—things originally confused in the 'here and now' of the all in the process of coming into being". The Real is that which is outside language and that resists symbolization absolutely. In Seminar XI Lacan defines the Real as "the impossible" because it is impossible to imagine, impossible to integrate into the Symbolic, and impossible to attain. It is this resistance to symbolization that lends the Real its traumatic quality. Finally, the Real is the object of anxiety, insofar as it lacks any possible mediation and is "the essential object which is not an object any longer, but this something faced with which all words cease and all categories fail, the object of anxiety par excellence."

==== The Sinthome ====
The term "sinthome" (French: [sɛ̃tom]) was introduced by Jacques Lacan in his seminar Le sinthome (1975–76). According to Lacan, sinthome is the Latin way (1495 Rabelais, IV,63) of spelling the Greek origin of the French word symptôme, meaning symptom. The seminar is a continuing elaboration of his topology, extending the previous seminar's focus (RSI) on the Borromean Knot and an exploration of the writings of James Joyce. Lacan redefines the psychoanalytic symptom in terms of his topology of the subject.

In "Psychoanalysis and its Teachings" (Écrits) Lacan views the symptom as inscribed in a writing process, not as ciphered message which was the traditional notion. In his seminar "L'angoisse" (1962–63) he states that the symptom does not call for interpretation: in itself it is not a call to the Other but a pure jouissance addressed to no-one. This is a shift from the linguistic definition of the symptom—as a signifier—to his assertion that "the symptom can only be defined as the way in which each subject enjoys (jouit) the unconscious in so far as the unconscious determines the subject". He goes from conceiving the symptom as a message which can be deciphered by reference to the unconscious structured like a language to seeing it as the trace of the particular modality of the subject's jouissance.

=== Desire ===
Lacan's concept of desire is related to Hegel's Begierde, a term that implies a continuous force, and therefore somehow differs from Freud's concept of Wunsch. Lacan's desire refers always to unconscious desire because it is unconscious desire that forms the central concern of psychoanalysis.

The aim of psychoanalysis is to lead the analysand to recognize his/her desire and by doing so to uncover the truth about his/her desire. However this is possible only if desire is articulated in speech: "It is only once it is formulated, named in the presence of the other, that desire appears in the full sense of the term." And again in The Ego in Freud's Theory and in the Technique of Psychoanalysis: "what is important is to teach the subject to name, to articulate, to bring desire into existence. The subject should come to recognize and to name her/his desire. But it isn't a question of recognizing something that could be entirely given. In naming it, the subject creates, brings forth, a new presence in the world." The truth about desire is somehow present in discourse, although discourse is never able to articulate the entire truth about desire; whenever discourse attempts to articulate desire, there is always a leftover or surplus.

Lacan distinguishes desire from need and from demand. Need is a biological instinct where the subject depends on the Other to satisfy its own needs: in order to get the Other's help, "need" must be articulated in "demand". But the presence of the Other not only ensures the satisfaction of the "need", it also represents the Other's love. Consequently, "demand" acquires a double function: on the one hand, it articulates "need", and on the other, acts as a "demand for love". Even after the "need" articulated in demand is satisfied, the "demand for love" remains unsatisfied since the Other cannot provide the unconditional love that the subject seeks. "Desire is neither the appetite for satisfaction, nor the demand for love, but the difference that results from the subtraction of the first from the second." Desire is a surplus, a leftover, produced by the articulation of need in demand: "desire begins to take shape in the margin in which demand becomes separated from need". Unlike need, which can be satisfied, desire can never be satisfied: it is constant in its pressure and eternal. The attainment of desire does not consist in being fulfilled but in its reproduction as such. As Slavoj Žižek puts it, "desire's raison d'être is not to realize its goal, to find full satisfaction, but to reproduce itself as desire".

Lacan also distinguishes between desire and the drives: desire is one and drives are many. The drives are the partial manifestations of a single force called desire. Lacan's concept of "objet petit a" is the object of desire, although this object is not that towards which desire tends, but rather the cause of desire. Desire is not a relation to an object but a relation to a lack (manque).

In The Four Fundamental Concepts of Psychoanalysis Lacan argues that "man's desire is the desire of the Other." This entails the following:

1. Desire is the desire of the Other's desire, meaning that desire is the object of another's desire and that desire is also desire for recognition. Here Lacan follows Alexandre Kojève, who follows Hegel: for Kojève the subject must risk his own life if he wants to achieve the desired prestige. This desire to be the object of another's desire is best exemplified in the Oedipus complex, when the subject desires to be the phallus of the mother.
2. In "The Subversion of the Subject and the Dialectic of Desire in the Freudian Unconscious", Lacan contends that the subject desires from the point of view of another whereby the object of someone's desire is an object desired by another one: what makes the object desirable is that it is precisely desired by someone else. Again Lacan follows Kojève. who follows Hegel. This aspect of desire is present in hysteria, for the hysteric is someone who converts another's desire into his/her own (see Sigmund Freud's "Fragment of an Analysis of a Case of Hysteria" in SE VII, where Dora desires Frau K because she identifies with Herr K). What matters then in the analysis of a hysteric is not to find out the object of her desire but to discover the subject with whom she identifies.
3. Désir de l'Autre, which is translated as "desire for the Other" (though it could also be "desire of the Other"). The fundamental desire is the incestuous desire for the mother, the primordial Other.
4. Desire is "the desire for something else", since it is impossible to desire what one already has. The object of desire is continually deferred, which is why desire is a metonymy.
5. Desire appears in the field of the Other—that is, in the unconscious.

Last but not least for Lacan, the first person who occupies the place of the Other is the mother and at first the child is at her mercy. Only when the father articulates desire with the Law by castrating the mother is the subject liberated from desire for the mother.

=== Drive ===
Lacan maintains Freud's distinction between drive (Trieb) and instinct (Instinkt). Drives differ from biological needs because they can never be satisfied and do not aim at an object but rather circle perpetually around it. He argues that the purpose of the drive (Triebziel) is not to reach a goal but to follow its aim, meaning "the way itself" instead of "the final destination"—that is, to circle around the object. The purpose of the drive is to return to its circular path and the true source of jouissance is the repetitive movement of this closed circuit. Lacan posits drives as both cultural and symbolic constructs: to him, "the drive is not a given, something archaic, primordial". He incorporates the four elements of drives as defined by Freud (pressure, end, object and source) to his theory of the drive's circuit: the drive originates in the erogenous zone, circles round the object, and returns to the erogenous zone. Three grammatical voices structure this circuit:

1. the active voice (to see)
2. the reflexive voice (to see oneself)
3. the passive voice (to be seen)

The active and reflexive voices are autoerotic—they lack a subject. It is only when the drive completes its circuit with the passive voice that a new subject appears, implying that, prior to that instance, there was no subject. Despite being the "passive" voice, the drive is essentially active: "to make oneself be seen" rather than "to be seen". The circuit of the drive is the only way for the subject to transgress the pleasure principle.

To Freud sexuality is composed of partial drives (i.e. the oral or the anal drives) each specified by a different erotogenic zone. At first these partial drives function independently (i.e. the polymorphous perversity of children), it is only in puberty that they become organized under the aegis of the genital organs. Lacan accepts the partial nature of drives, but (1) he rejects the notion that partial drives can ever attain any complete organization—the primacy of the genital zone, if achieved, is always precarious; and (2) he argues that drives are partial in that they represent sexuality only partially and not in the sense that they are a part of the whole. Drives do not represent the reproductive function of sexuality but only the dimension of jouissance.

Lacan identifies four partial drives: the oral drive (the erogenous zones are the lips (the partial object the breast—the verb is "to suck"), the anal drive (the anus and the faeces, "to shit"), the scopic drive (the eyes and the gaze, "to see") and the invocatory drive (the ears and the voice, "to hear"). The first two drives relate to demand and the last two to desire.

The notion of dualism is maintained throughout Freud's various reformulations of the drive-theory. From the initial opposition between sexual drives and ego-drives (self-preservation) to the final opposition between the life drives (Lebenstriebe) and the death drives (Todestriebe). Lacan retains Freud's dualism, but in terms of an opposition between the symbolic and the imaginary and not referred to different kinds of drives. For Lacan all drives are sexual drives, and every drive is a death drive (pulsion de mort) since every drive is excessive, repetitive and destructive.

The drives are closely related to desire, since both originate in the field of the subject. But they are not to be confused: drives are the partial aspects in which desire is realized—desire is one and undivided, whereas the drives are its partial manifestations. A drive is a demand that is not caught up in the dialectical mediation of desire; drive is a "mechanical" insistence that is not ensnared in demand's dialectical mediation.

=== Other concepts ===
- Foreclosure (psychoanalysis)
- The Four discourses
- The graph of desire
- Lack (manque)
- The "Lamella"
- Matheme
- Name of the Father
- Objet petit a
- Sinthome
- Demand

== Lacan on error and knowledge ==
Building on Freud's The Psychopathology of Everyday Life, Lacan long argued that "every unsuccessful act is a successful, not to say 'well-turned', discourse", highlighting as well "sudden transformations of errors into truths, which seemed to be due to nothing more than perseverance". In a late seminar, he generalised more fully the psychoanalytic discovery of "truth—arising from misunderstanding", so as to maintain that "the subject is naturally erring... discourse structures alone give him his moorings and reference points, signs identify and orient him; if he neglects, forgets, or loses them, he is condemned to err anew".

Because of "the alienation to which speaking beings are subjected due to their being in language", to survive "one must let oneself be taken in by signs and become the dupe of a discourse... [of] fictions organized in to a discourse". For Lacan, with "masculine knowledge irredeemably an erring", the individual "must thus allow himself to be fooled by these signs to have a chance of getting his bearings amidst them; he must place and maintain himself in the wake of a discourse... become the dupe of a discourse... les non-dupes errent".

Lacan comes close here to one of the points where "very occasionally he sounds like Thomas Kuhn (whom he never mentions)", with Lacan's "discourse" resembling Kuhn's "paradigm" seen as "the entire constellation of beliefs, values, techniques, and so on shared by the members of a given community".

== Clinical contributions ==
=== Variable-length session ===
The "variable-length psychoanalytic session" was one of Lacan's crucial clinical innovations, and a key element in his conflicts with the IPA, to whom his "innovation of reducing the fifty-minute analytic hour to a Delphic seven or eight minutes (or sometimes even to a single oracular parole murmured in the waiting-room)" was unacceptable. Lacan's variable-length sessions lasted anywhere from a few minutes (or even, if deemed appropriate by the analyst, a few seconds) to several hours. This practice replaced the classical Freudian "fifty minute hour".

With respect to what he called "the cutting up of the 'timing'", Lacan asked the question, "Why make an intervention impossible at this point, which is consequently privileged in this way?" By allowing the analyst's intervention on timing, the variable-length session removed the patient's former certainty as to the length of time that they would be on the couch. When Lacan adopted the practice, "the psychoanalytic establishment were scandalized"—and, given that "between 1979 and 1980 he saw an average of ten patients an hour", it is perhaps not hard to see why. Psychoanalysis was "reduced to zero", though the treatments were no less lucrative.

At the time of his original innovation, Lacan described the issue as concerning "the systematic use of shorter sessions in certain analyses, and in particular in training analyses"; and in practice it was certainly a shortening of the session around the so-called "critical moment" which took place, so that critics wrote that "everyone is well aware what is meant by the deceptive phrase 'variable length' ... sessions systematically reduced to just a few minutes". Irrespective of the theoretical merits of breaking up patients' expectations, it was clear that "the Lacanian analyst never wants to 'shake up' the routine by keeping them for more rather than less time". Lacan's shorter sessions enabled him to take many more clients than therapists using orthodox Freudian methods, and this growth continued as Lacan's students and followers adopted the same practice.

Accepting the importance of "the critical moment when insight arises", object relations theory would nonetheless suggest that "if the analyst does not provide the patient with space in which nothing needs to happen there is no space in which something can happen". Julia Kristeva would concur that "Lacan, alert to the scandal of the timeless intrinsic to the analytic experience, was mistaken in wanting to ritualize it as a technique of scansion (short sessions)".

== Writings and writing style ==
According to Jean-Michel Rabaté, Lacan in the mid-1950s classed the seminars as commentaries on Freud rather than presentations of his own doctrine (like the writings), while Lacan by 1971 placed the most value on his teaching and "the interactive space of his seminar" (in contrast to Sigmund Freud). Rabaté also argued that from 1964 onward, the seminars include original ideas. However, Rabaté also wrote that the seminars are "more problematic" because of the importance of the interactive performances, and because they were partly edited and rewritten.

Most of Lacan's psychoanalytic writings from the 1940s through to the early 1960s were compiled with an index of concepts by Jacques-Alain Miller in the 1966 collection, titled simply Écrits. Published in French by Éditions du Seuil, they were later issued as a two-volume set (1970/1) with a new "Preface". A selection of the writings (chosen by Lacan himself) were translated by Alan Sheridan and published by Tavistock Press in 1977. The full 35-text volume appeared for the first time in English in Bruce Fink's translation published by Norton & Co. (2006). The Écrits were included on the list of 100 most influential books of the 20th century compiled and polled by the broadsheet Le Monde.

Lacan's writings from the late sixties and seventies (thus subsequent to the 1966 collection) were collected posthumously, along with some early texts from the nineteen thirties, in the Éditions du Seuil volume Autres écrits (2001).

Although most of the texts in Écrits and Autres écrits are closely related to Lacan's lectures or lessons from his Seminar, more often than not the style is denser than Lacan's oral delivery, and a clear distinction between the writings and the transcriptions of the oral teaching is evident to the reader.

An often neglected aspect of Lacan's oral and writing style is his influence from his colleague and personal friend Henry Corbin, who introduced Lacan to the thought of Ibn Arabi. Similarities have been pointed out between the writing styles of Lacan and Ibn Arabi.

Jacques-Alain Miller is the sole editor of Lacan's seminars, which contain the majority of his life's work. "There has been considerable controversy over the accuracy or otherwise of the transcription and editing", as well as over "Miller's refusal to allow any critical or annotated edition to be published". Despite Lacan's status as a major figure in the history of psychoanalysis, some of his seminars remain unpublished. Since 1984, Miller has been regularly conducting a series of lectures, "L'orientation lacanienne." Miller's teachings have been published in the US by the journal Lacanian Ink.

Lacan's writing is notoriously difficult, due in part to the repeated Hegelian/Kojèvean allusions, wide theoretical divergences from other psychoanalytic and philosophical theory, and an obscure prose style. For some, "the impenetrability of Lacan's prose... [is] too often regarded as profundity precisely because it cannot be understood". Arguably at least, "the imitation of his style by other 'Lacanian' commentators" has resulted in "an obscurantist antisystematic tradition in Lacanian literature".

Although Lacan is a major influence on psychoanalysis in France and parts of Latin America, in the English-speaking world his influence on clinical psychology has been far less and his ideas are best known in the arts and humanities. However, there are Lacanian psychoanalytic societies in both North America and the United Kingdom that carry on his work.

One example of Lacan's work being practiced in the United States is found in the works of Annie G. Rogers (A Shining Affliction; The Unsayable: The Hidden Language of Trauma), which credit Lacanian theory for many therapeutic insights in successfully treating sexually abused young women. Lacan's work has also reached Quebec, where The Interdisciplinary Freudian Group for Research and Clinical and Cultural Interventions (GIFRIC) claims that it has used a modified form of Lacanian psychoanalysis in successfully treating psychosis in many of its patients, a task once thought to be unsuited for psychoanalysis, even by psychoanalysts themselves.

== Legacy ==
In his introduction to the 1994 Penguin edition of Lacan's The Four Fundamental Concepts of Psycho-Analysis, translator and historian David Macey describes Lacan as "the most controversial psycho-analyst since Freud". His ideas had a significant impact on post-structuralism, critical theory, French philosophy, film theory, and clinical psychoanalysis. Theorists such as Rafael Holmberg have argued that Lacanian psychoanalysis even contributes to a criticism of the idea of Nature.

In 2003, Rabaté described "The Freudian Thing" (1956) as one of his "most important and programmatic essays".

== Criticism ==
=== Theory of psychoanalysis ===
Social psychologist, psychoanalyst, and humanistic philosopher Erich Fromm rejected Lacan's view on psychoanalysis whereby "true psychoanalysis is founded on the relation between man and talk [parole]," and denounced the reduction of analysis to "a pure and simple exchange of words," arguing that the relation is instead about an "exchange of signs." Fromm supports "clarity and unambiguity" in the communication with others (autrui) and opposes the Lacanian "wordplay [that] is associated with the provision of meaning." Freudian and Lacanian psychoanalyst Élisabeth Roudinesco, in her biography of Lacan, writes that she found some writings of her subject "incomprehensible", as also recorded by Maurice Merleau-Ponty, Claude Lévi-Strauss, and Martin Heidegger.

Former Lacan student Didier Anzieu, in a 1967 article titled "Against Lacan," described him as a "danger" because he kept his students tied to an "unending dependence on an idol, a logic, or a language," by holding out the promise of "fundamental truths" to be revealed "but always at some further point ...and only to those who continued to travel with him." According to Sherry Turkle, these attitudes are "representative of how most members of the Association talk about Lacan." (Note: When the French Society of Psychoanalysis requested official recognition from and affiliation with the Association Psychanalytique Internationale (International Psychoanalytical Association) in 1959, the API demanded the sidelining of Jacques Lacan as a didactician. Two currents of the Société Française de Psychanalyse (French Society of Psychoanalysis) then stood opposed to each other: one, which became the majority in the SFP in November 1963, was led by Daniel Lagache; while a second current, which became the minority, brought together the supporters of Jacques Lacan.)

By 1977, Lacan was declaring that he was not "too keen" (French: pas chaud-chaud) to claim that "when one practices psychoanalysis, one knows where one goes", stating that "psychoanalysis, like every other human activity, undoubtedly participates in abuse. One does as if one knows something."

Lacan's charismatic authority has been linked to the many conflicts among his followers and in the analytic schools he was involved with. His intellectual style has also come in for much criticism. Eclectic in his use of sources, Lacan has been seen as concealing his own thought behind the apparent explication of that of others. Thus, his "return to Freud" was called by Malcolm Bowie "a complete pattern of dissenting assent to the ideas of Freud . . . Lacan's argument is conducted on Freud's behalf and, at the same time, against him". Bowie has also suggested that Lacan suffered from both a love of system and a deep-seated opposition to all forms of system.

=== Therapeutic practice ===
Lacan, in his psychoanalytic practice, came to hold sessions of diminishing duration. Eventually, Lacan's student relates, they often lasted no more than five minutes, held sometimes with Lacan standing in the typically open door of the room. (Note: Godin relates, without criticizing this, that Lacan would often read Le Figaro throughout a session, "turning the pages noisily" and sometimes exclaiming 'this is insane!' at what he was reading. And he'd never give change if the client did not have the exact amount of money for the session.) According to Godin, Lacan sometimes struck patients, once literally kicking out a female patient. Author and Lacanian psychoanalyst Jacques-Alain Miller, who also was his son in law, asserts that "[Lacan]'s morality derives from a superior cynicism."

Lacan was criticised for being aggressive with his clients, often physically hitting them, sometimes sleeping with them, (Note: In her biography, Roudinesco clarifies that this would happen "always away from the place where the analysis was taking place.") and charging "exorbitant amounts of money" for each session. (Note: Rey, who was Marie Claire editor, relates that he, in order to be able to meet the prices of Lacan, for whom he constantly felt "gratitude," abandoned journalism and started writing best-sellers.) Jean Laplanche argued that Lacan could have "harmed" some of his clients.

Others have been more forceful still, describing him as "The Shrink from Hell" and focusing on the many associates–from lovers and family to colleagues, patients, and editors–who were left damaged in his wake.

=== Feminist criticism ===
Many feminist thinkers have criticized Lacan's thought. American philosopher Cynthia Willett accuses Lacan for portraying the mother less as a "loving", "nurturing" presence in the infant's world, than as a "whore" who abandons the child to a "higher bidder for her affections", while Judith Butler, philosopher and gender studies scholar, reworks these notions as "gender performativity".

Psycholinguist and cultural theorist Luce Irigaray "ridicules" through "mimicry and exaggeration" these representations of femininity posited as natural and proper by Lacan. Irigaray accuses Lacan of perpetuating phallocentric mastery in philosophical and psychoanalytic discourse. (Note: Irigaray too has been criticized by Sokal and Bricmont for ostensibly misusing scientific terminology in her work. Among their points of criticism are the interest Irigaray claims Einstein had in "accelerations without electromagnetic re-equilibrations", her confusing special relativity with general relativity, and her claim (Irigaray, To Speak is Never Neutral, 2017) that Einstein's mass–energy equivalence equation is a "sexed equation" since "it privileges the speed of light over other speeds that are vitally necessary to us".)

Others have echoed this accusation, seeing Lacan as trapped in the very phallocentric mastery his language ostensibly sought to undermine. The result, Castoriadis would maintain, was to make all thought depend upon Lacan himself, and thus to stifle the capacity for independent thought among all those around him.

In an interview with anthropologist James Hunt, Sylvia Lacan said of her late husband: "He was a man who worked tremendously hard. Tremendously intelligent. He was...what is called, well, a domestic tyrant... But he was worth the trouble. I have absolutely no reproaches to make against him. Just the contrary. But it was not possible to be a wife, a mother to my children, and an actress at the same time."

=== Mathematics in psychoanalysis ===
In their work Fashionable Nonsense (1997), through which their stated intention was to show that "famous intellectuals" abuse scientific terminology and concepts, professors of physics Alan Sokal and Jean Bricmont examine Lacan's frequent references to mathematics. They are highly critical of his use of terms from mathematical fields, accusing him of "superficial erudition", of abusing scientific concepts that he does not understand, and of producing statements that are "not even wrong".

In 1960, the mathematical "calculations" he presents in a seminar are assessed as "pure fantasies".

Sokal and Bricmont find Lacan to be "fond" of topology, in which, though, they see Lacan committing serious errors. He uses technical terms erroneously, e.g. "space", "bounded", "closed", and even "topology" itself, and posits claims about a literal and not just symbolic or even metaphorical relation of topological mathematics with neurosis. (Note: E.g. Lacan states: "[The] torus really exists and it is exactly the structure of the neurotic. It is not an analogon; it is not even an abstraction, because an abstraction is some sort of diminution of reality, and I think [the torus] is reality itself." Lacan (1970))

In the book's preface, the authors state they shall not enter into the debate over the purely psychoanalytic part of Lacan's work. Nonetheless, after presenting their case, they comment that "Lacan never explains the relevance of his mathematical concepts for psychoanalysis", stating that "the link with psychoanalysis is not supported by any argument". Equally meaningless they find his "famous formulae of sexuation" offered in support for the maxim "There are no sexual relations". Considering the "cryptic writings", the "play on words" and "fractured syntax", as well as the "reverent exegesis" accorded to Lacan's work by "disciples", they point out a similarity to religiosity. (Note: They end with posing the rhetorical question whether we are "dealing with a new religion".)

=== Incomprehensibility ===
Several critics have dismissed Lacan's work wholesale. French philosopher François Roustang called it an "incoherent system of pseudo-scientific gibberish", and quoted linguist Noam Chomsky's opinion that Lacan was an "amusing and perfectly self-conscious charlatan". Noam Chomsky, in a 2012 interview on Veterans Unplugged, said: "[Q]uite frankly I thought [Lacan] was a total charlatan. He was just posturing for the television cameras in the way many Paris intellectuals do. Why this is influential, I haven't the slightest idea. I don't see anything there that should be influential."

Academic and former Lacanian analyst Dylan Evans (Note: Evans published a dictionary of Lacanian terms in 1996, titled An Introductory Dictionary of Lacanian Psychoanalysis.) came to dismiss Lacanianism as lacking a sound scientific basis and as harming rather than helping patients. He criticized Lacan's followers for treating Lacan's writings as "holy writ". Richard Webster decries what he sees as Lacan's obscurity, arrogance, and the resultant "Cult of Lacan".

Roger Scruton included Lacan in his book Fools, Frauds and Firebrands: Thinkers of the New Left, and named him as the only 'fool' included in the book—his other targets merely being misguided or frauds.

In Les Freudiens hérétiques, the 8th tome of his work Contre-histoire de la philosophie (Anti-History of Philosophy), philosopher and author Michel Onfray describes Lacan's Écrits as "illegible". According to Onfray, Lacan engages in constant word play, has a taste for the formulaic, and deploys "incantatory glossolalia" and unnecessary neologisms. (Note: In 2002, the Lacanian School of Psychoanalysis, École lacanienne de psychanalyse, edited and published a book titled 789 Neologismes de Jacques Lacan (Epel publishers).) He calls Lacan a "charlatan" and a "dandy figure" who "sinks into autism", eventually becoming senile.

== Works ==
Selected works published in English listed below. More complete listings can be found at Lacan.com.

- Écrits: A Selection, transl. by Alan Sheridan, New York: W.W. Norton & Co., 1977, ISBN 0393300471.
- Écrits: The First Complete Edition in English, transl. by Bruce Fink, New York: W.W. Norton & Co., 2006, ISBN 0393329259.
- Feminine Sexuality: Jacques Lacan and the école freudienne, edited by Juliet Mitchell and Jacqueline Rose, transl. by Jacqueline Rose, W.W. Norton & Co., New York, 1983, ISBN 0393016331.
- First Writings, transl. by Russell Grigg, Cambridge, Polity, 2025.
- My Teaching, transl. by David Macey, Verso, London, 2008, ISBN 9781844672714
- The Seminar, Book I. Freud's Papers on Technique, 1953–1954, edited by Jacques-Alain Miller, transl. by John Forrester, W.W. Norton & Co., New York, 1988, ISBN 0393306976.
- The Seminar, Book II. The Ego in Freud's Theory and in the Technique of Psychoanalysis, 1954–1955, ed. by Jacques-Alain Miller, transl. by Sylvana Tomaselli, W.W. Norton & Co., New York, 1988, ISBN 0393307093.
- The Seminar, Book III. The Psychoses, edited by Jacques-Alain Miller, transl. by Russell Grigg, W.W. Norton & Co., New York, 1993, ISBN 0393316122.
- The Seminar, Book V. Formations of the Unconscious, edited by Jacques-Alain Miller, transl. by Russell Grigg, Polity Press, New York, 2017, ISBN 0745660371.
- The Seminar, Book VII. The Ethics of Psychoanalysis, 1959–1960, ed. by Jacques-Alain Miller, transl. by Dennis Porter, W.W. Norton & Co., New York, 1992, ISBN 0393316130.
- The Seminar, Book VIII. Transference, ed. by Jacques-Alain Miller, transl. by Bruce Fink, Polity Press, New York, 2015, ISBN 0745660398.
- The Seminar, Book X. Anxiety, 1962–1963, ed. by Jacques-Alain Miller, transl. by A. R. Price, Polity Press, New York, 2014, ISBN 074566041X.
- The Seminar, Book XI. The Four Fundamental Concepts of Psychoanalysis, 1964, ed. by Jacques-Alain Miller, transl. by Alan Sheridan, W.W. Norton & Co., New York, 1977, ISBN 0393317757.
- The Seminar, Book XVII. The Other Side of Psychoanalysis, ed. by Jacques-Alain Miller, transl. by Russell Grigg, W.W. Norton & Co., New York, 2007, ISBN 0393330400.
- The Seminar, Book XIX. ...or Worse, ed. by Jacques-Alain Miller, Polity Press, New York, 2018, ISBN 0745682448.
- The Seminar, Book XX. Encore: On Feminine Sexuality, the Limits of Love and Knowledge, ed. by Jacques-Alain Miller, transl. by Bruce Fink, W.W. Norton & Co., New York, 1998, ISBN 0393319164.
- The Seminar, Book XXIII. The Sinthome, ed. by Jacques-Alain Miller, transl. by A.R. Price, Polity Press, New York, 2016, ISBN 1509510001.
- Television: A Challenge to the Psychoanalytic Establishment, ed. Joan Copjec, trans. Rosalind Krauss, Jeffrey Mehlman, et al., W.W. Norton & Co., New York, 1990, ISBN 0393335674.
- The Triumph of Religion, transl. by Bruce Fink, Cambridge: Polity, 2015.

== See also ==
- Chronology of Jacques Lacan Archived 11 December 2018 at the Wayback Machine
- The Seminars of Jacques Lacan Archived 19 December 2018 at the Wayback Machine
- Jacques Lacan's Complete French Bibliography Archived 27 December 2005 at the Wayback Machine
- Of Structure as the Inmixing of an Otherness Prerequisite to Any Subject Whatever Archived 28 December 2005 at the Wayback Machine – Johns Hopkins University (1966)
- Jacques Lacan; Kant with Sade Archived 25 February 2006 at the Wayback Machine
- The Seminar on "The Purloined Letter" Archived 28 March 2006 at the Wayback Machine
- The Crime of the Papin Sisters Archived 6 January 2007 at the Wayback Machine
- Love beyond Law Archived 26 November 2010 at the Wayback Machine – further discussions by Žižek on Desire in the Lacanian conceptual edifice
