= Seminars of Jacques Lacan =

1952–1980 seminars in Paris

The Seminar of Jacques Lacan, Book I

From 1952 to 1980 French psychoanalyst and psychiatrist Jacques Lacan gave an annual seminar in Paris. The transcripts of these seminars from 1953 were later published as the Books of the Seminar (The Seminar of Jacques Lacan), edited by Jacques-Alain Miller.

== History ==
In 1951, Jacques Lacan, then a member of the Paris Psychoanalytic Society, initiated a series of weekly Wednesday meetings in his apartment on Rue de Lille, Paris. In 1952, the meetings were transferred to the Sainte-Anne Hospital where Lacan worked as a consultant psychiatrist, making the meetings into a seminar. Book I of the seminar is the edited transcription of the 1953–1954 weekly lessons at Sainte-Anne, where the Seminar would be held until 1963.

The final seminar to be held at Sainte-Anne is published as Book X (Anxiety, 1962–1963). The single lesson delivered on 20 November 1963 and published as "Introduction to the Names-of-the-Father Seminar" is the introduction to a seminar that was never delivered, and which has thus been dubbed The Inexistent Seminar. Indeed, the night before this lesson, Lacan had been informed that the SFP "had voted, in a complicated procedure, to refuse to ratify the motion striking Lacan's name from the list of the training analysts", thus stripping Lacan of the right to continue as a training analyst within the International Psychoanalytical Association. This institutional manoeuvre effectively brought to a close the early period of Lacan's teaching.

The middle period of Lacan's teaching began two months later with The Four Fundamental Concepts of Psychoanalysis. Hosted by the École normale supérieure, under the patronage of the School for Advanced Studies in the Social Sciences, the Seminar now enjoyed "a much larger audience" and represented a "change of front". This series of lessons, now edited as Book XI of the Seminar, opens with the lesson "Excommunication" in which Lacan expands on the circumstances and implications of his exclusion from the IPA. The second lesson, "The Freudian Unconscious and Ours" sets the tone of his ensuing teaching by indicating potential points of discontinuity with respect to Sigmund Freud's oeuvre.

Lacan's yearly Seminar continued at the École normale supérieure until 1969. From autumn 1969 onwards, it was hosted by the Law Faculty at Place du Panthéon. This series of seminars, the late period of Lacan's teaching, opened with The Other Side of Psychoanalysis, now edited as Book XVII of the Seminar, and continued until the late seventies.

As Lacan's teaching moved into the phase known as the very late teaching of Lacan, his declining health led to less regular appointments. Lacan's final public delivery on 12 July 1980, sometimes referred to as "The Caracas Seminar" was not, as this title indicates, part of the Parisian series.

== Transcription ==
From the very first seminar at Sainte-Anne, the weekly sessions were recorded by a shorthand typist. For two decades, copies of these typescripts were the only available record of Lacan's oral teaching, Lacan himself having declined the various offers extended to him to have the typescripts edited into publishable volumes.

In the early seventies, Jacques-Alain Miller offered some indications as to what would constitute an effective editorial strategy and at Lacan's invitation drew up a transcription of the twenty lessons that made up the eleventh seminar, The Four Fundamental Concepts of Psychoanalysis delivered in 1964. The result pleased Lacan, and François Wahl at Éditions du Seuil was happy to publish.

Seminar XI was published in 1973. In his "Postface", Lacan writes: "A transcription, now here is a word I am discovering thanks to the modesty of J. A. M., Jacques-Alain Miller by name: what gets read passes through the writing whilst surviving there intact". Lacan had said to Miller, "we will sign it together", but Miller had preferred to opt for a more discreet "Text established by…", a nod to the editing credits to the Greek and Latin texts in the Collection Budé.

Both Lacan and Wahl were keen for more seminars to be published and Lacan entrusted the task to Miller. Four more books of the Seminar were published during Lacan's lifetime. The first to be translated into English was Book XI, published by Hogarth Press in 1977 with a specially written preface. To date (2025), twenty of the seminars have been published in French, several of which have also appeared in English translation. The remaining seminars have all been established by Miller and are currently awaiting publication. As of 2013, the Books of the Seminar will be published by Éditions de la Martinière.

== Chronological list ==
Book	Years	Title	English Translation
I	1953–54	Book I: Les écrits techniques de Freud (Seuil, 1975)	Translated by J. Forrester as Freud's Papers on Technique (Cambridge UP/Norton, 1988)
II	1954–55	Book II: Le moi dans la théorie de Freud et dans la technique de la psychanalyse (Seuil, 1978)	Translated by S. Tomaselli as The Ego in Freud's Theory and in the Technique of Psychoanalysis (Cambridge UP/Norton, 1988)
III	1955–56	Book III: Les psychoses (Seuil, 1981)	Translated by R. Grigg as The Psychoses (Routledge/Norton, 1993)
IV	1956–57	Book IV: La relation d'objet et les structures freudiennes (Seuil, 1994)	Translated by A. R. Price as The Object Relation (Polity, 2020)
V	1957–58	Book V: Les formations de l'inconscient (Seuil, 1998)	Translated by R. Grigg as The Formations of the Unconscious (Polity, 2017)
VI	1958–59	Book VI: Le désir et son interprétation (La Martinière 2013)	Translated by B. Fink as Desire and Its Interpretation (Polity, 2019); Selected lessons published in Ornicar ? 24–25 and translated by J. Hulbert in Yale French Studies 55/56, 11–22.
VII	1959–60	Book VII: L'éthique de la psychanalyse (Seuil, 1986)	Translated by D. Porter as The Ethics of Psychoanalysis (Routledge/Norton, 1992)
VIII	1960–61	Book VIII: Le transfert (2nd edition Seuil, 2001)	Translated by B. Fink as Transference (Polity, 2015)
IX	1961–62	Book IX: L'identification (Seuil, forthcoming January 22, 2027)	
X	1962–63	Book X: L'angoisse (Seuil, 2004)	Translated by A. R. Price as Anxiety (Polity, 2014)
–	1963	The "Inexistent" Seminar. Introduction published as Les Noms du père (Seuil, 2005)	Translated by J. Mehlman as "Introduction to 'The Names of the Father' Seminar", in Television: A Challenge to the Psychoanalytic Establishment, 1990
XI	1964	Book XI: Les quatre concepts fondamentaux de la psychanalyse (Seuil, 1973)	Translated by A. Sheridan as The Four Fundamental Concepts of Psychoanalysis (Hogarth, 1977)
XII	1964–65	Book XII: Problèmes cruciaux pour la psychanalyse (Seuil/Champ Freudien, 2025)	
XIII	1965-66	Book XIII: L'objet de la psychanalyse (Seuil/Champ Freudien, 2026)	
XIV	1966–67	Book XIV: La logique du fantasme (Seuil/Champ Freudien, 2023)	Translated by A. R. Price as The Logic of Fantasy (Polity, 2026)
XV	1967–68	Book XV: L'acte psychanalytique (Seuil/Champ Freudien, 2024)	Translated by A. R. Price as The Psychoanalytic Act (Polity, forthcoming December 30, 2026)
XVI	1968–69	Book XVI: D'un Autre à l'autre (Seuil, 2006)	Translated by B. Fink as From an Other to the other (Polity, 2023)
XVII	1969–70	Book XVII: L'envers de la psychanalyse (Seuil, 1991)	Translated by R. Grigg as The Other Side of Psychoanalysis (Norton, 2007)
XVIII	1971	Book XVIII: D'un discours qui ne serait pas du semblant (Seuil, 2006)	Translated by B. Fink as On a Discourse that Might Not be a Semblance (Polity, 2025); Lesson VI translated by P. Dravers in Hurly-Burly 9, 15–28
XIX	1971–72	Book XIX: . . . ou pire (Seuil, 2011)	Translated by A. R. Price as . . . or Worse (Polity, 2018); Three lessons at Sainte-Anne published as Je parle aux murs (Seuil, 2011). Translated by A. R. Price as Talking to Brick Walls (Polity, 2017)
XX	1972–73	Book XX: Encore, (Seuil, 1975)	Translated by B. Fink as Encore, On Feminine Sexuality: The Limits of Love and Knowledge (Norton, 1998)
XXI	1973–74	Book XXI: Les non-dupes errent	
XXII	1974–75	Book XXII RSI Lessons published in Ornicar ? 2–5	
XXIII	1975–76	Book XXIII Le sinthome (Seuil, 2005)	Translated by A. R. Price as The Sinthome (Polity, 2016)
XXIV	1976–77	Book XXIV: L'insu que sait de l'une-bévue s'aile à mourre Lessons published in Ornicar ? 12–18	
XXV	1977–78	Le moment de conclure	
XXVI	1978–79	La topologie et le temps	
XXVII	1980	Dissolution; Lessons published in Ornicar ? 20–23	
