= Demand (psychoanalysis) =

Concept in Lacanian psychoanalysis

In Lacanianism, demand (French: demande) is the way in which instinctive needs are alienated through language and signification. The concept of demand was developed by Lacan—outside of Freudian theory—in conjunction with need and desire in order to account for the role of speech in human aspirations, and forms part of the Lacanian opposition to the approach to language acquisition favored by ego psychology.

== Language acquisition ==
For Lacan, demand is the result of language acquisition on physical needs – the individual's wants are automatically filtered through the alien system of external signifiers.

Where traditionally psychoanalysis had recognised that learning to speak was a major step in the ego's acquisition of power over the world, and celebrated its capacity for increasing instinctual control, Lacan by contrast stressed the more sinister side of man's early submergence in language.

He argued that "demand constitutes the Other as already possessing the 'privilege' of satisfying needs", and that indeed the child's biological needs are themselves altered by "the condition that is imposed on him by the existence of the discourse, to make his need pass through the defiles of the signifier". Thus even in speaking one's demands, the latter are altered; and even when they are met, the child finds that it no longer wants what it thought it wanted.

== Desire ==
In Lacanian thought, a demand results when a lack in the Real is transformed into the Symbolic medium of language. Demands faithfully express unconscious signifying formations, but always leave behind a residue or kernel of desire, representing a lost surplus of jouissance for the subject, (because the Real is never totally symbolizable).

As a result, for Lacan, "desire is situated in dependence on demand – which, by being articulated in signifiers, leaves a metonymic remainder which runs under it". The frustration inherent in demand – whatever is actually asked for is 'not it' – is what gives rise to desire.

== The Other's demands ==
The demands of human society are initially mediated via the Mother; with the discourse of whom the infant comes to identify, subsuming its own non-verbal self-expression.

The result in the neurotic may be a dominance of parental demand, and of the social objects valued by such demands – jobs, degrees, marriage, success, money and the like. Lacan considered indeed that for the neurotic "the demand of the Other assumes the function of an object in his phantasy...this prevalence given by the neurotic to demand".

== Transference ==
Lacan considered that the transference appears in the forms of demands from the patient – demands which he stressed the analyst must resist.

Through such demands, he states,

the whole past opens up right down to early infancy. The subject has never done anything other than demand, he could not have survived otherwise, and...regression shows nothing other than a return to the present of signifiers used in demands

François Roustang however has challenged the Lacanian view, arguing that the patient's demand, rather than undermining the analysis, may be a positive attempt to get the analyst to shift their therapeutic stance.

== See also ==
- Four discourses
- Julia Kristeva
- Semiotics
- D. W. Winnicott
