= Four discourses =

Concept in Lacanian psychoanalysis

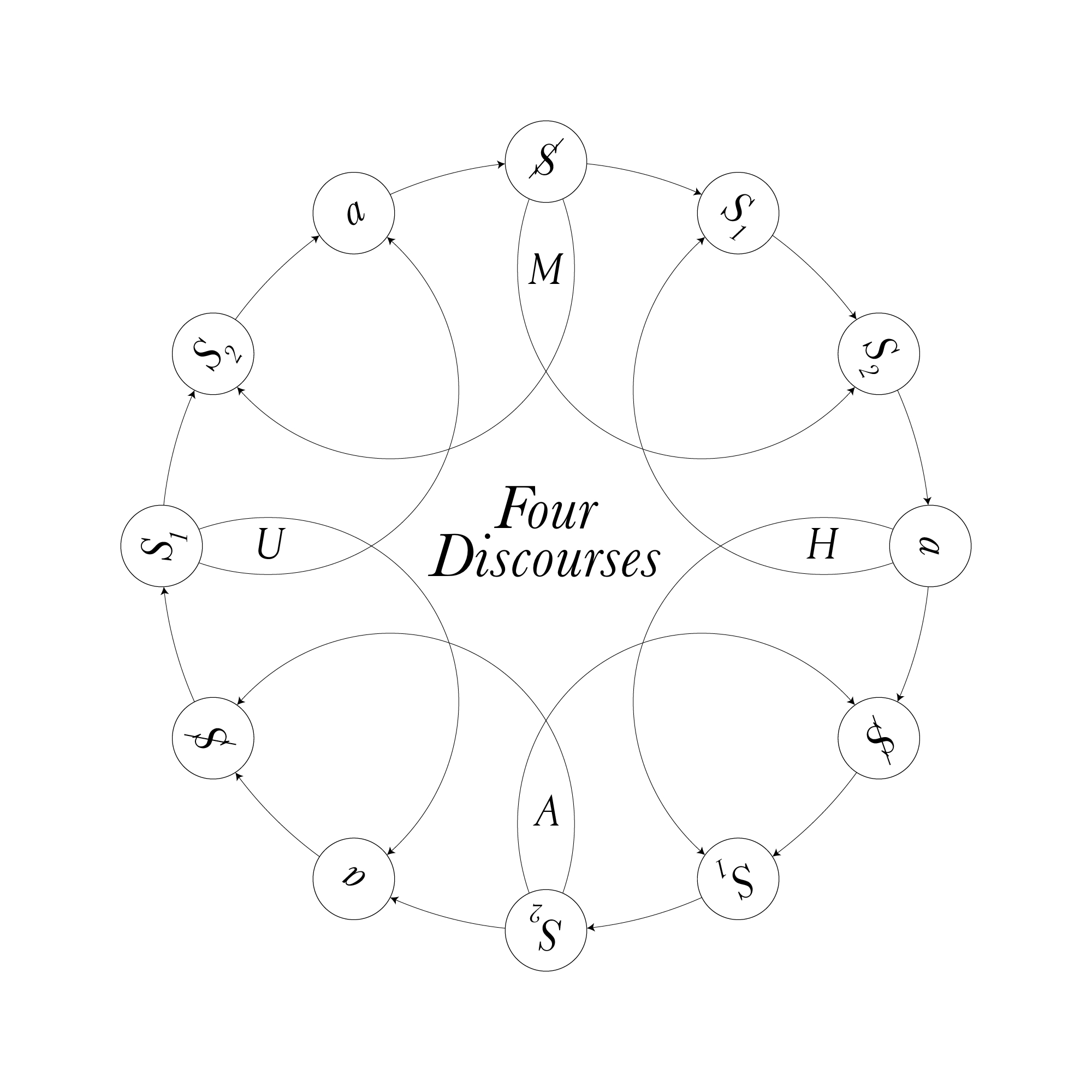
Diagram depicting all four discourses as a single system.

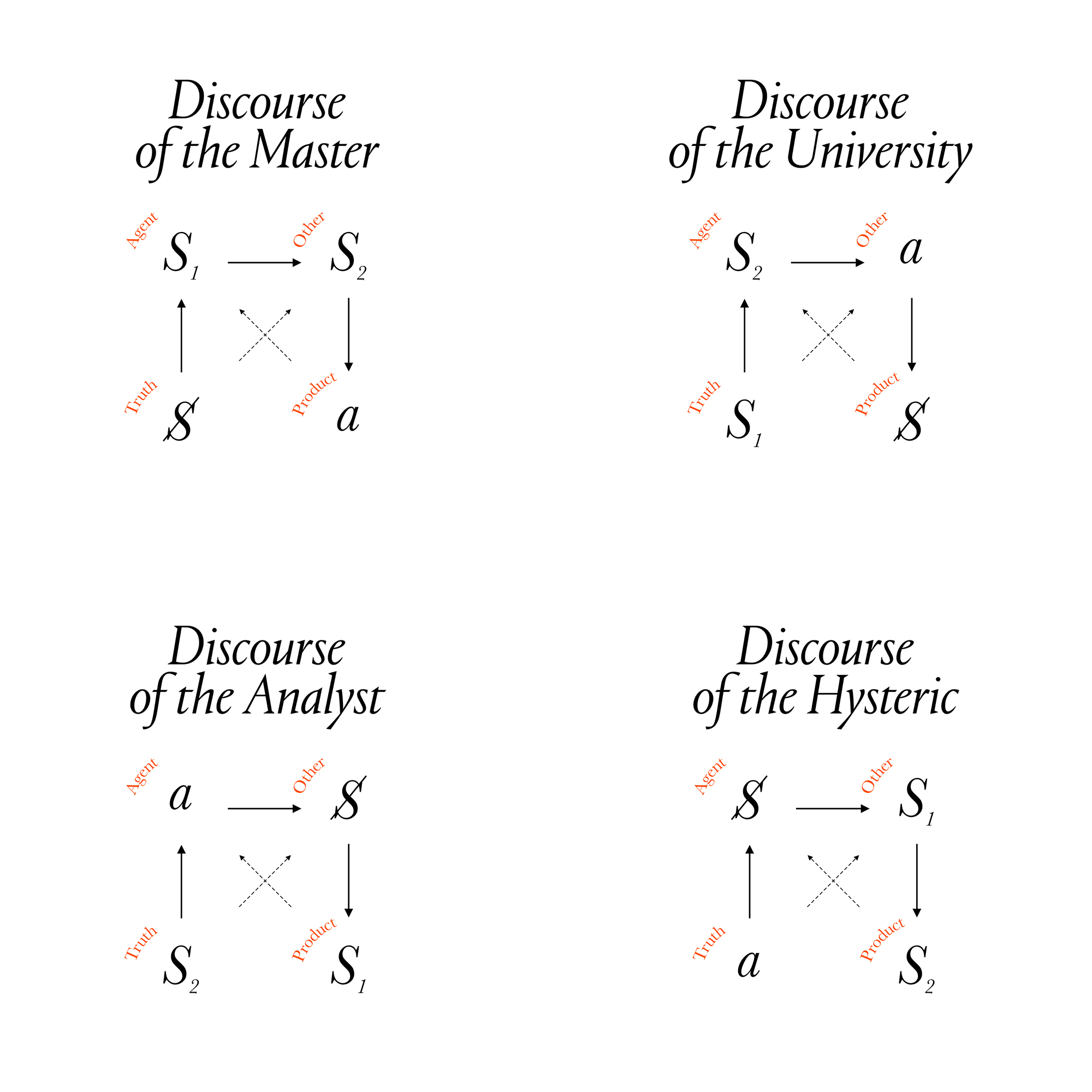
Four Discourses depicted side by side.

Four discourses is a concept developed by French psychoanalyst Jacques Lacan. He argued that there were four fundamental types of discourse. He defined four discourses, which he called Master, University, Hysteric and Analyst, and suggested that these relate dynamically to one another.

Lacan's theory of the four discourses was initially developed in 1969, perhaps in response to the events of social unrest during May 1968 in France, but also through his discovery of what he believed were deficiencies in the orthodox reading of the Oedipus complex. The four discourses theory is presented in his seminar L'envers de la psychanalyse and in Radiophonie, where he starts using "discourse" as a social bond founded in intersubjectivity. (Note: The original presentation of Lacan's theory is in his Seminar XVII (English translation; New York: Norton, 2007) As Dylan Evans asserts, Lacan uses the term discourse "to stress the transindividual nature of language, the fact that speech always implies another subject, an interlocutor."

== Necessity of formalising psychoanalysis ==
Prior to the development of the four discourses, the primary guideline for clinical psychoanalysis was Freud's Oedipus complex. In Lacan's Seminar of 1969–70, Lacan argues that the terrifying Oedipal father that Freud invoked was already castrated at the point of intervention. The castration was symbolic rather than physical. In an effort to stem analysts' tendency to project their own imaginary readings and neurotic fantasies onto psychoanalysis, Lacan worked to formalise psychoanalytic theory with mathematical functions with renewed focus on the semiology of Ferdinand de Saussure. This would ensure only a minimum of teaching is lost when communicated and also provide the conceptual architecture to limit the associations of the analyst.

== Structure ==
Discourse, in the first place, refers to a point where speech and language intersect. The four discourses represent the four possible formulations of the symbolic network which social bonds can take and can be expressed as the permutations of a four-term configuration showing the relative positions—the agent, the other, the product and the truth—of four terms, the subject, the master signifier, knowledge and objet petit a.

=== Positions ===
Agent (upper left), the speaker of the discourse.

Other (upper right), what the discourse is addressed to.

Product (lower right), what the discourse has created.

Truth (lower left), what the discourse attempted to express.

=== Variables ===
S_{1}: the dominant, ordering and sense giving signifier of a discourse as it is received by the group, community or culture. S_{1} refers to "the marked circle of the field of the Other," it is the Master-Signifier. S_{1} comes into play in a signifying battery conforming the network of knowledge.

S_{2}: what is ordered by or set in motion by S_{1}. It is knowledge, the existing body of knowledge, the knowledge of the time. S_{2} is the "battery of signifiers, already there" at the place where "one wants to determine the status of a discourse as status of statement," that is knowledge (savoir).

$: The subject, or person, for Lacan is always barred in the sense that it is incomplete, divided. Just as we can never know the world around us except in the partial refractions of language and the domination of identification, so, too, we can never know ourselves. $ is the subject, marked by the unbroken line (trait unaire) which represents it and is different from the living individual who is not the locus of this subject.

a: the objet petit a or surplus-jouissance. In Lacan's psychoanalytic theory, objet petit a stands for the unattainable object of desire. It is sometimes called the object cause of desire. Lacan always insisted that the term should remain untranslated, "thus acquiring the status of an algebraic sign". It is the object-waste or the loss of the object that occurred when the original division of the subject took place –the object that is the cause of desire: the plus-de-jouir.

=== Four Discourses ===
==== Discourse of the Master ====
We see a barred subject ($) positioned as master signifier's truth, who's itself positioned as discourse's agent for all other signifiers (S_{2}), that illustrates the structure of Hegel's dialectic of the master and the slave. The master, (S_{1}) is the agent that puts the other, (S_{2}) to work: the product is a surplus, object a, that master struggles to appropriate alone. In a modern society, an example of this discourse can be found within so-called “family-like” work environments that tend to hide direct subordination under the mask of “favorable” submission to master's truth that generates value. The Master's reach for the truth in principle is fulfillment of his/her castratedness through subject's work.

==== Discourse of the University ====
Knowledge in position of an agent is handed down by the institute which legitimises the master signifier (S_{1}) taking the place of discourse's truth. Impossibility to satisfy one's need with a knowledge (which is a structural thing) produces a barred subject ($) as discourses sustain, and the cycle repeats itself through the primary subject being slavish to the institution values to fulfill the castratedness. The discourse's truth "knowledge " is being positioned aside of this loop and never the direct object of the subject, and the institute controls the subjects's objet a and defines the subject's master signifier's. Pathological symptom of an agent in this discourse is seeking fulfillment of their castratedness through enjoying the castratedness of their subject.

==== Discourse of the Analyst ====
The position of an agent—the analyst—is occupied by objet a of the analysand. Analyst's silence leads to reverse hysterization, as such the analyst becomes a mirror of question himself to the analysand, thus embodies barred subject's desire that lets his symptom speak itself through speech and thus be interpreted by the analyst. The master signifier of the analysand emerges as a product of this role. Hidden knowledge, positioned as discourse's truth (S_{2}) stands for both analyst interpretation technique and knowledge acquired from the subject.

==== Discourse of the Hysteric ====
Despite its pathological aura, the hysteric's discourse exhibits the most common mode of speech, blurring the line between the clinical image and the otherness of social settings. Object a truth is defined by the interrogative nature of the subject's address ('Who am I?') as well as tryst for satisfaction of knowledge. This mutually drives the barred subject and turns against the agent's master signifiers. It leads the agent to produce a new knowledge (discourse's product) in a futile attempt to provide a barred subject with an answer to fulfill the subject's castratedness (Lacan in Discourse of the Analyst breaks the pathological cycle of it by purposefully leaving the question unanswered, reversing the discourse and putting the analyst in the place of the hysteric's desire). However, object a of the subject searches for the agent's object a, thus without being a subject like in the 'Discourse of the University' the Hysteric ends up gathering knowledge instead of their object a truth.

== Relevance for cultural studies ==
Slavoj Žižek uses the theory to explain various cultural artefacts, including Don Giovanni and Parsifal.

| Discourse | Don Giovanni | Parsifal | Characteristics |
|---|---|---|---|
| Master | Don Ottavio | Amfortas | inauthentic, inconsistent |
| University | Leporello | Klingsor | inauthentic, consistent |
| Hysteric | Donna Elvira | Kundry | authentic, inconsistent |
| Analyst | Donna Anna | Parsifal | authentic, consistent |

== See also ==
- Demand
