= Alan Sheridan =

English author & translator (1934–2015)

Alan Mark Sheridan-Smith (1934 – 17 August 2015) was an English author and translator.

== Life ==
Sheridan studied English at St Catharine's College, Cambridge before spending 5 years in Paris as English assistant at Lycée Henri IV and Lycée Condorcet. Returning to London, he briefly worked in publishing before becoming a freelance translator. He translated works of fiction, history, philosophy, literary criticism, biography and psychoanalysis by Jean-Paul Sartre, Jacques Lacan, Michel Foucault, Alain Robbe-Grillet, Robert Pinget and many others. He was the first to publish a book in English on Foucault's work and also wrote a biography of André Gide.

Sheridan occasionally contributed to the London Review of Books in the 1980s.

== Works ==
=== Translations ===
(partial list)

- Robert Pinget, Mahu or the Material, 1966
- Raymond Radiguet, The Devil in the Flesh: A Novel, 1968
- Philippe Sollers, The Park: A Novel, 1968
- Alain Robbe-Grillet, The Immortal One. London: Calder & Boyars, 1971
- Georges Balandier, Political Anthropology, 1972
- Michel Foucault, The Birth of the Clinic, 1973
- Lucien Goldmann, Towards a Sociology of the Novel. New York: Tavistock Publications, 1974
- Michel Foucault, Mental Illness and Psychology. New York: Harper and Row, 1976
- Michel Foucault, The Archaeology of Knowledge, 1976
- Michel Foucault, Discipline and Punish: The Birth of the Prison, 1976
- Jean-Paul Sartre, Critique of Dialectical Reason, 1976
- Manuel Castells, The Urban Question: A Marxist Approach. London: Edward Arnold, 1977
- Jacques Lacan, The Seminar, Book XI, The Four Fundamental Concepts of Psychoanalysis, London: Hogarth, 1976, reprinted by Harmondsworth: Penguin, 1993.
- Jacques Lacan, Écrits: A Selection, 1977
- Sébastien Japrisot, One Deadly Summer. New York: Harcourt Brace Jovanovich, 1980. ISBN 0-15-169381-1
- Pierre Petitfils, Rimbaud, 1987
- Michel Foucault, Politics, Philosophy, Culture: Interviews and Other Writings, 1977-1984, ed. Lawrence D. Kritzmann, 1988
- Tahar Ben Jelloun, The Sand Child, 1989
- Michel Tournier, Gilles & Jeanne, 1990
- Tahar Ben Jelloun, The Sacred Night, 1991
- Jean Lacouture, De Gaulle: The Ruler, 1945-1970, 1991. ISBN 0-393-03084-9
- Agota Kristof, The Notebook, 1989
- Abdelwahab Bouhdiba, Sexuality in Islam, 1998

=== Novels ===
- Vacation, 1972
- Time and Place, 2003

=== Other ===
- Michel Foucault: The Will to Truth (1980)
- André Gide: A Life in the Present (Cambridge, Massachusetts: Harvard University Press, 1999)
