= The Imaginary (psychoanalysis) =

Term in Lacanian psychoanalysis

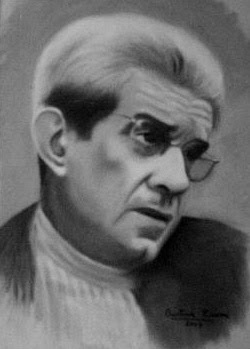
Jacques Lacan

In Lacanian psychoanalysis, the Imaginary (or Imaginary Order) is one of three terms in the psychoanalytic perspective of Jacques Lacan, along with the Symbolic and the Real. Each of the three terms emerged gradually over time, undergoing an evolution in Lacan's own development of thought. "Of these three terms, the 'imaginary' was the first to appear, well before the Rome Report of 1953…[when the] notion of the 'symbolic' came to the forefront." Indeed, looking back at his intellectual development from the vantage point of the 1970s, Lacan epitomised it as follows:

"I began with the Imaginary, I then had to chew on the story of the Symbolic ... and I finished by putting out for you this famous Real."

Accordingly, as Hoens and Puth (2004) express, "Lacan's work is often divided into three periods: the Imaginary (1936–1953), the Symbolic (1953–1963), and the Real (1963–1981)." Regarding the former, "Lacan regarded the 'imago' as the proper study of psychology and identification as the fundamental psychical process. The imaginary was then the…dimension of images, conscious or unconscious, perceived or imagined." It would be in the decade or two following his 1936 delivery of Le stade du miroir at Marienbad that Lacan's concept of the Imaginary was most fully articulated.

== The Imaginary ==
The basis of the Imaginary Order is the formation of the ego in the "mirror stage." By articulating the ego in this way, "the category of the imaginary provides the theoretical basis for a long-standing polemic against ego-psychology" on Lacan's part. Since the ego is formed by identifying with the counterpart or specular image, "identification" is an important aspect of the imaginary. The relationship, whereby the ego is constituted by identification, is a locus of "alienation,"—another feature of the imaginary—and is fundamentally narcissistic: thus Lacan wrote of "the different phases of imaginary, narcissistic, specular identification – the three adjectives are equivalent," which make up the ego's history.

If "the Imaginary, the Symbolic and the Real are an unholy trinity whose members could as easily be called Fraud, Absence and Impossibility," then the Imaginary, a realm of surface appearances which are inherently deceptive, is "Fraud."

Lacan also identifies the imaginary with the intuitive realm: 'intuition, in other words the imaginary' (SXIII: 30/3/66), 'the imaginary, or intuitive, plane' (SII: 18). 'Everything intuitive is far closer to the imaginary than to the symbolic' (SII: 316). The imaginary is the realm of comprehension, in the Kantian sense, where one takes things in as wholes rather than piecemeal[.]

— Michael Lewis citing Lacan

== The fragmented body ==
For Lacan, the driving-force behind the creation of the ego as mirror-image was the prior experience of the phantasy of the fragmented body. "Lacan was not a Kleinian, though he was the first in France…to decipher and praise her work," but "the threatening and regressive phantasy of 'the body-in-pieces'…is explicitly related by Lacan to Melanie Klein's paranoid position." Klein's "specific phantasy…that something inside the person is seeking to pull him apart and render him dead by dismemberment" fuelled for Lacan "the succession of phantasies that extends from a fragmented body-image…to the assumption of the armour of an alienating identity"—to the ego as other-identification, as "fraud."

== The Symbolic ==
With the increasing prominence of the Symbolic in Lacan's thought after 1953, the Imaginary becomes viewed in a rather different light, as structured by the symbolic order. It is still the case that "the body in pieces finds its unity in the image of the other…[or] its own specular image" but no longer does "analysis consist in the imaginary realisation of the subject…to make it well-rounded, this ego, to ... have definitely integrated all its disjointed fragmentary states, its scattered limbs, its pregenital phases, its partial drives." Instead, "one finds a guide beyond the imaginary, on the level of the symbolic plane."

It also became apparent that the imaginary involves a linguistic dimension: whereas the signifier is the foundation of the symbolic, the "signified" and "signification" belong to the imaginary. Thus language has both symbolic and imaginary aspects: "words themselves can undergo symbolic lesions and accomplish imaginary acts of which the patient is the subject.…In this way, speech may become an imaginary, or even real object."

To the Lacan of the fifties, "the entire analytic experience unfolds, at the joint of the imaginary and the symbolic", with the latter as the central key to growth: "the goal in analysing neurotics is to eliminate the interference in symbolic relations created by imaginary relations…dissipating imaginary identifications." The Imaginary was the problem, the Symbolic the answer, so that "an entire segment of the analytic experience is nothing other than the exploration of blind alleys of imaginary experience". Thus it is "in the disintegration of the imaginary unity constituted by the ego that the subject finds the signifying material of his symptoms", the "identity crisis…[when] the false-self system disintegrates."

== In the late Lacan ==
Just as the early predominance of the Imaginary was eclipsed after the Rome Report, so too by the end of the Sixties, the Symbolic would be overshadowed by the Real, as from "this point on, Lacan downplays the Oedipus complex, seen as a mythical – and so imaginarized – version of unconscious organization."

Nevertheless, Lacan could still claim that the "objective of my teaching…is to dissociate…what belongs to the imaginary and…what belongs to the symbolic." In the Borromean knots, he considered he had found a possible topological counterpart to the interconnections of Imaginary, Symbolic, and Real. "Lacan's seminar was at times now little more than a silent demonstration of the properties of the interlocking knots which illustrated the imbrication of the real, the symbolic and the imaginary."

== French culture ==
Use of "the adjective [imaginary] as a noun can…be traced to the works of the novelist André Gide…[and] was probably given greater currency by [Sartre's] L'Imaginaire." In Lacan's hands, the Imaginary came close to being an omnivorously colonising interpretive machine: thus René Girard regretted that "To the Lacanian, whatever I call mimetic must correspond to…'capturé par l'imaginaire.'"

With the post-Lacanian fissiparous tendencies of his "schools", the term can perhaps return to the general culture, as when the philosopher Gilles Deleuze (1972) defines the imaginary "by games of mirroring, of duplication, of reversed identification and projection, always in the mode of the double," or when Cornelius Castoriadis defines the imaginary as the capacity humans have to create other forms of individual and social existence.

== See also ==
- Imaginary (sociology)
- Ideology and Ideological State Apparatuses, an influential essay by Louis Althusser, who draws upon Lacan's 'Imaginary' and 'mirror stage', among other notions, to develop a theory of ideology.
