= Jouissance =

Topic in philosophy and psychoanalysis

Jouissance (pronounced [ʒwisɑ̃s]) is a French language term implying "enjoyment"; the term jouissance connotes jouir 'to come' as in sexual parlance and has the meaning 'orgasm' in French.

In continental philosophy and psychoanalysis, jouissance is the transgression of a subject's regulation of pleasure. It is linked to the division and splitting of the subject involved, which spontaneously compels the subject to transgress the prohibitions imposed on enjoyment and to go beyond the pleasure principle. Beyond this limit, pleasure then becomes pain, before this, initial "painful principle" develops into what Jacques Lacan called jouissance; it is suffering, epitomized in Lacan's remark about "the recoil imposed on everyone, in so far as it involves terrible promises, by the approach of jouissance as such". He linked jouissance to the castration complex, and especially to the aggression of the death drives.

In feminist theory, jouissance describes a form of women's pleasure or sexual rapture, which is a fusion of mental, physical, and spiritual aspects bordering on mystical communion. Jouissance is considered the source of a woman's creative power.

== In Lacanian psychoanalysis ==
English editions of the works of Jacques Lacan have generally left jouissance untranslated in order to help convey its specialised usage. Lacan first developed his concept of an opposition between jouissance and the pleasure principle in his Seminar "The Ethics of Psychoanalysis" (1959–1960). Lacan considered that "there is a jouissance beyond the pleasure principle" linked to the partial drive. Yet according to Lacan, the result of transgressing the pleasure principle is not more pleasure, but instead pain, since there is only a certain amount of pleasure that the subject can bear. In his later seminar "The Other Side of Psychoanalysis" (1969–1970), Lacan introduced the concept of "surplus-enjoyment" (French plus-de-jouir) inspired by Marx's concept of surplus-value: he considered objet petit a as the excess of jouissance, which has no use value, and which persists for the mere sake of jouissance.

Lacan considered that jouissance is essentially phallic, meaning that it does not relate to the "Other" as such. In his seminar "Encore" (1972–1973), however, Lacan introduced the idea of specifically feminine jouissance, saying that women have "in relation to what the phallic function designates of jouissance, a supplementary jouissance...a jouissance of the body which is...beyond the phallus". This feminine jouissance is ineffable, for both women and men may experience it, yet know nothing about it. Jane Gallop has noted that "it is impossible to give an adequate translation of jouissance", adding that it is crucial "not to assimilate it, but to retain its foreignness."

== In philosophy and literary theory ==
The Slovenian philosopher Slavoj Žižek, a known Lacanian theorist, has adopted the term in his philosophy; it also plays an important role in the work of Julia Kristeva and Roland Barthes.

In his 1973 literary theory book The Pleasure of the Text, Barthes divides the effects of texts into two: plaisir (translated as "pleasure") and jouissance. The distinction corresponds to a further distinction Barthes makes between "readerly" and "writerly" texts. The pleasure of the text corresponds to the readerly text, which does not challenge the reader's position as a subject. The writerly text provides bliss, which explodes literary codes and allows the reader to break out of his or her subject position.

For Barthes plaisir is, "a pleasure... linked to cultural enjoyment and identity, to the cultural enjoyment of identity, to a homogenising movement of the ego." As Richard Middleton puts it, "Plaisir results, then, from the operation of the structures of signification through which the subject knows himself or herself; jouissance fractures these structures."

=== In feminist theory ===
The French feminist writer Hélène Cixous uses the term jouissance to describe a form of women's pleasure or sexual rapture that combines mental, physical and spiritual aspects of female experience, bordering on mystical communion: "explosion, diffusion, effervescence, abundance...takes pleasure (jouit) in being limitless". Cixous maintains that jouissance is the source of a woman's creative power and that the suppression of jouissance prevents women from finding their own fully empowered voice. The concept of jouissance is explored by Cixous and other authors in their writings on Écriture féminine, a strain of feminist literary theory that originated in France in the early 1970s.

Other feminists have argued that Freudian "hysteria" is jouissance distorted by patriarchal culture and say that jouissance is a transcendent state that represents freedom from oppressive linearities. In her introduction to Cixous' The Newly Born Woman, literary critic Sandra Gilbert writes: "to escape hierarchical bonds and thereby come closer to what Cixous calls jouissance, which can be defined as a virtually metaphysical fulfillment of desire that goes far beyond [mere] satisfaction... [It is a] fusion of the erotic, the mystical, and the political."

== See also ==
- Emphyteutic lease
- Joie de vivre
- Limerence
- Limit-experience
- Narcissistic elation
- Sexual fetishism
- The Real
