= Materiality turn =

Theoretical movement in organization studies

The materiality turn in organization studies is the theoretical movement emphasizing objects, instruments and embodiments involved in organizations and organizing (the theoretical debate [1]) and the ontologies underpinnings theories about organizations and organizing, what deeply 'matters' in the study of organizations and organizing (the ontological debate[2]; see e.g. Latour, 2007; de Vaujany and Mitev, 2016).

In the context of organization studies (see e.g., Tsoukas and Knudsen, 2005 or Clegg et al., 2006), a turn is a collective direction of research, focused on some coherent sets of concepts, theories, and ideas, which represent a point of bifurcation for the field itself. Most turns in organization studies relate to broader ones in the social sciences and humanities.

The materiality turn is one of these major turns. It emerged in the nineties, precisely because materiality and the modes of existence of things were questioned by the digitalization of societies and organizations (Van Dijk, 2012), the disembodiment of agency (Hayles, 1999), and the increasingly distributed modalities of collective activity (e.g. with mobile technologies, digital nomadism, systematization of entrepreneurship, coworking spaces, end of work, see e.g. Engeström, Miettinen and Punamäki, 1999 or Turner et al., 2006). The turn can be defined as an intellectual project, a forum that encompasses a diversity of ontologies, and it has a specific history.

== Overview ==
The materiality turn corresponds to a broad intellectual project partly related to the symbolic approach of artefacts (see Galiardi, 1990): it develops post-discursive perspectives intended to make sense of the 'materiality' and 'matter-iality' of practices and processes at stake in organizations, organizing and management (Carlile and Langley, 2013;, de Vaujany and Mitev, 2013).

By contrast to debates about sociomateriality (emphasizing the co-constitution of materiality and sociality) which are more likely to lead to a strict relational ontology (see Orlikowski, 2007), the materiality turn is a forum gathering a diversity of ontologies or ontological dimensions (de Vaujany and Mitev, 2016): phenomenology, pragmatism, critical realism, post-Marxism, post-structuralism, post-humanism, post-modernism, etc., which can all contribute and broaden the current debate about materiality.

== History ==
The materiality turn has a specific history and originates from various historical sources, in particular: Marxism (a key source), Foucauldian studies, symbolic artefacts (and aesthetic) studies, material culture, science and technology studies (STS). These studies are largely post-Marxist in the sense that Marxist studies (e.g. with notions such as "Materialism", "Historical Materialism" or "Material dialectic") have been a major turning point both in the development of post-Hegelian ontologies and (probably far from Marx own view) in the disentanglement of ideal and material dimensions, or the distinction between Nature and Society, which are questioned today by some promoters of the materiality turn. The rediscovery of these seminal contributions has provided useful concepts such as materiality, material, devices, apparatus, modes of existence, intra-action, affordance, agentivity, entanglement, heterotopic space, material or sociomaterial practices, ontologies, process, network, meshwork, among others.

Following Latour (Latour, 2007: 139), the materiality turn is related to "the way we move knowledge forward in order to access things that are far away or otherwise inaccessible" (materiality) or "the way things move to keep themselves in existence." We propose to call this 'matter-iality', to emphasise how things matter.

Instrumentations, mediations, materializations, and preformations are at the heart of the materiality turn, which has strong intersections and commonalities with other turns such as the practice turn, communication turn, visual turn, process turn, performativity turn or spatial turn.

== Both a set of theories and ontologies ==
If some researchers are interested in the materiality turn their focus on spaces, artefacts, objects, instruments, technologies, and bodies and their relationships with practices, others prefer to explore broader movements and associations. The latter are not so preoccupied with the usual dichotomies such as nature vs. culture, nature vs. society, or human vs. non-human entities.

Most of all, it seems that the materiality turn and the ontology turn largely converge. Exploring what deeply matters in the study of organizations and organizing leads (or should lead) to the reflexive identification of ontologies (Goodman, 2001); Coole and Frost, 2010; Introna, 2013; Jones, 2013; Kelly, 2014; de Vaujany and Mitev, 2016). Various answers exist about what deeply matters in the study of organizations and organizing, and what it means to be human, and how humanity is understood influences each perspective (Introna, 2013; de Vaujany and Mitev, 2016). For some, relations and associations (involved in movements and assemblages) are the key ontological units. For others, it is more at the level of agency and intentionality (more or less embodied) that the main ontological unit is situated. Lastly, for some other researchers, sociological matter, what is expected to endure across time and space, structures, infrastructures, and superstructures, are expected to be the key units of analysis.

The materiality turn strives to go beyond oppositional debates between various proponents of sociomateriality, such as agential realism vs. critical realism or interpretivism vs. performativity. In short, the material turn is a theoretical stream covering what is expected to endure across time and space, or what is temporally and spatially constituted through everyday activities, i.e. tools, objects, artefacts, technologies, built spaces, bodies and embodiment and their relationships with organizations and organizing (Miller, 1998; 2005; Carlile and Langley, 2013; Dameron, Lê and Lebaron, 2015).

The bulk of this stream of research hankers for post-discursive stances, i.e., visions which do not see language as a mere vehicle of representations and include non-linguistic (visual) elements in analysis (e.g,. through ethnographic analysis, see Meyer, Höllerer, Jancsary and Van Leeuwen, 2013). Some of these approaches adopt critical and historical views to explain how the materiality and semiosis of our world have changed in the post-WWII period (Hayles, 1999; de Vaujany and Mitev, 2015 ).

Paradoxically, ontogenesis itself then needs to be historicized. Some suggest overcoming at some point the materialist terminology for a more technicist one (Latour, 2014; Lemonnier, 2014). It is also an ontological debate (de Vaujany and Mitev, 2016) about the main assumptions underlying the theorizations involved, for instance, in the debates mentioned above.

Some of the key issues the materiality-turn addresses relate to: the entanglement of material and social elements in practices (Orlikowski, 2007); the problem of ethics in a complex world and the issue of control and moral delegations in a more and more digital world (Dale, 2005; Introna, 2013); materiality and regulation in a post-crisis economy (Wasserman and Frenkel, 2011); the temporal, spatial and material dimensions of legitimacy, institutional logics and legitimation which remain a key issue for managers and citizens (Jones, 2013); or the new modalities of collaboration involved in the rising collaborative economy, among others. The material turn is therefore not just philosophical and ontological discussions, but fundamentally about what is happening in organizations and societies.

== See also ==
- New materialism
- Materiality (social sciences and humanities)

== Notes ==
[1] Ontology is about what is, in contrast to epistemology, which explores what we know and how we know it. For Bhaskar (1979)), one should avoid the epistemic fallacy, i.e., the conflation between what is and what we know. Beyond this strong statement (not ontologically neutral itself), it is probably important to keep in mind the possibility that epistemology and ontology sometimes need to be distinguished. [2] The theoretical debate quickly leads to the ontological debate. For numerous researchers in organization studies, objects, instruments, and bodies cannot be research objects or relevant research objects per se. They need to be part of broader practices, activities, routines, or processes. Why, when, how? This corresponds to the ontological debate.
