= Postqualitative inquiry =

Research philosophy

Postqualitative inquiry is a research philosophy proposed by University of Georgia Professor of Education Elizabeth St. Pierre in 2011 that advocates for an intentional deconstructive stance toward concepts within traditional research methods on human subjects, such as interviews, data analysis, and validity. It incorporates ideas from posthumanism, critical theory, poststructuralism, and indigenous research philosophies, emphasizing the use of epistemological and ontological principles to deconstruct and reconstruct assumed knowledge about "the nature of being and human being, language, representation, knowledge, truth, [and] rationality." Postqualitative inquiry does not follow a defined method and methodology but is rather something that "emerges as a process methodology" in the midst of traditional research. It is a direct response to and move away from conventional humanist qualitative research methodology.

== Overview ==
The discourse about postqualitative inquiry arose from the question of “what comes next for qualitative research," particularly regarding how to approach "a problem in the midst of inquiry” in a way that allows new ideas to take shape from preconceived ones. St. Pierre suggested that being restricted to method conforms new research to the form of existing research, hindering progressive insights. In conducting postqualitative inquiry, researchers are able to subvert the endless "repetition of what is known" and instead move toward the limit of what is possible to know. Increasingly, qualitative researchers encounter situations and contexts that are not well known. Postqualitative inquiry posits that through application of epistemology, ontology, and related philosophies to phenomena they encounter through the research process, researchers more substantially add to the body of understanding about those subjects and their relation to the world. It also emphasizes the importance of positionality not only through disclosure in a positionality statement but as an active part of the research process. The core purpose of postqualitative inquiry is to reconcile the "post" philosophies—poststructuralism, posthumanism, postmodernism, and others—with the practice of humanist qualitative methodology.

Elizabeth St. Pierre began to develop an early version of the concept in her doctoral dissertation. The first published work to use the term postqualitative inquiry was her 2011 article "Postqualitative research: The critique and the coming after." The term is based on the idea that "methodology should never be separated from epistemology and ontology". Doing so, states St. Pierre, reduces inquiry to methods, process, and technique, making it mechanized and inhibiting the discovery of new knowledge by challenging existing knowledge. In publishing this idea, St. Pierre created an opening for the development of new ways of conducting research that move beyond conventional humanist approach and incorporate the "posts." Emerging forms of this "post"-centered research that incorporate ontology include new empiricism and new materialism. Collectively this movement is called "the ontological turn."

The practice of postqualitative inquiry does not have defined methods and requires understanding of its foundational philosophies. Thus, unlike with qualitative and quantitative methods, there is no prescription for how to conduct it. Rather, it is based on the application of philosophical ideas of being and knowing and may look different depending on the context and subjects of the research being conducted.

== Key concepts ==
Emerging and established ideas from qualitative, quantitative, and indigenous research intersect with and are incorporated into postqualitative inquiry. Many concepts in postqualitative research are based on the works of physicist and feminist theorist Karen Barad.

=== Agential realism ===
Agential realism is a theory proposed by Karen Barad that asserts the inseparability of ontology from materiality. Both human and non-human entities have agency that is not independent of that of the other; instead, they intertwine as a dynamism of forces that continuously exchange with and influence one another inseparably. Agential realism contrasts with the concept of Cartesian dualism.

=== Diffraction ===
Diffraction or diffractive methodology is the process of reading and comparing different ideas, ontologies, theories, philosophies, and methods "through rather than against one another" without strictly rejecting or negating one or the other. Donna Haraway originated the concept, inspired by Trinh-Minh-Ha's works on disrupting the binary logic of identity and difference. Karen Barad expanded on diffraction, identifying it as a physical process that produces more creative insights and is "both constructive and deconstructive rather than destructive."

=== Entanglement ===
Entanglement describes the relationships of responsibility and obligation between and among human and non-human entities and is part of agential realism. These relationships are characterized by mutuality that is reflected in discursive practice (language) and vice versa. According to Karen Barad, entanglement is not a combining of the material (nonhuman, reality) and language (human, social) but rather sees them as being intertwined, inseparable, and iterative. The word "human," for example, though defined ontologically, is an abstract concept that has been used to separate humans from nonhumans, as well as humans from other humans, in the physical, material sense. Language is oriented to the human, but entanglements, and in turn the meaning of language, generate a complex ecology that cannot be reduced to dualism.

=== Intra-action ===
Closely associated with agential realism, intra-action is the view that living subjects and nonliving matter consist of relational versus individual existences. Donna Haraway originated the concept in 1992 and Karen Barad expanded on it. These relations are collectively viewed as phenomena rather than as two or more pre-existing, individual entities coming together and without discrete boundaries. Intra-action takes a non-anthropocentric view of relations. Although humans are entangled in intra-actions, they are not created by humans; humans themselves are phenomena versus individual subjects. Intra-actions reflect connectedness with the world and are "differentiated and entangled simultaneously." A common example of intra-action from Barad is the writing of a book. According to Barad, an author does not write a book, and a book does not write the author. Instead, the author and the book are continuously and mutually co-constituted as an intra-action.

=== Material-discursive ===
The term material-discursive describes matter as having agency and influence in the same way as living subjects. The actions of matter are called material-discursive practices or forces, and these practices reflect the many ways that matter impacts the world (socially, historically, ecologically, etc.) A material-discursive view acknowledges that matter gives meaning to phenomena through intra-action, and as such influences their ontology. This contrasts with a representational view of concepts as ideas captured only by humans through language. Barad give the example of measuring electrons with two different apparatuses—one that interprets the electrons as waves and another that interprets them as particles. The material conditions of the apparatus determine the meaning of the electrons.

=== Onto-epistemology ===
Onto-epistemology, or "the study of practices of knowing and being," is a word that reflects "being" (ontology) and "knowing" (epistemology) as inseparable and nondichotomous. The hyphenated combination of the two branches of metaphysics represents their interconnectedness. Inherent to this concept is the ability of nonhuman entities, including matter, to influence being and knowing. Barad justified the need to see them as inseparable by pointing out that "we know because we are of the world," hence being and knowing cannot be independent of each other.

=== Spacetimemattering ===
Taking views from quantum physics, Barad coined spacetimemattering to describe space, time, and matter as intra-active phenomena. Space, time, and matter are inseparable, thus the combined term spacetimemattering. In Meeting the Universe Halfway, Barad describe this entanglement as a result of the diffraction of space, time and matter through each other: "The ‘time of now’ is not an infinitely thin slice of time called the present moment, but rather a thick-now that is a crystallization of the past diffracted through the present." The concept also incorporates the notion that time is inseparable from justice, as space, time, and matter are political, thus making spacetimemattering a provocative lens through which to view social inequalities encountered in qualitative research. In reframing time as iterative and entangled instead of linear and independent, for example, the Western capitalist narrative about progress and advancing civilization unravels and is revealed to be complicit in the exercise of injustice.
