= Wanda Orlikowski =

American computer scientist

Wanda J. Orlikowski
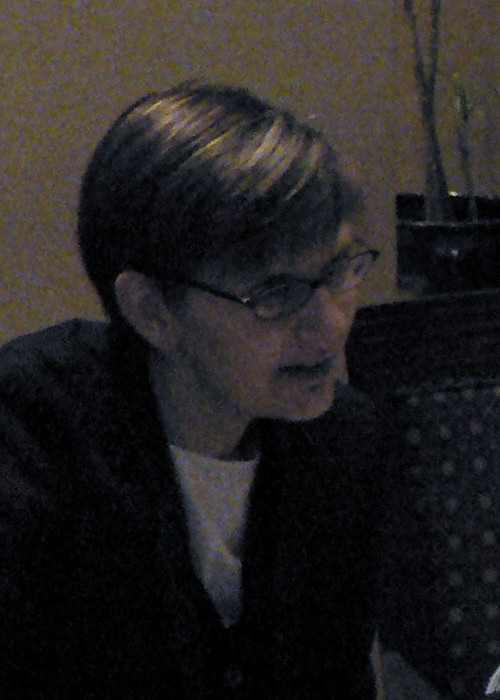
- Education: New York University
- Known for: Practice lens Sociomateriality
- Scientific career
- Fields: Information systems Organization Studies
- Website: mitsloan.mit.edu/faculty/directory/wanda-orlikowski

Wanda Janina Orlikowski is a US-based organizational theorist and information systems researcher, and the Alfred P. Sloan Professor of Information Technologies and Organization Studies at the MIT Sloan School of Management, Massachusetts Institute of Technology.

== Education ==
Orlikowski received her B.Comm from the University of the Witwatersrand in 1977, an M. Comm from the same university in 1982, and an MPhil and Ph.D. from the New York University Stern School of Business in 1989.

== Career and research ==
She has served as a visiting Centennial Professor of Information Systems at the London School of Economics and Political Science, and a visiting professor at the Judge Business School at the University of Cambridge. She is currently the Alfred P. Sloan Professor of Information Technologies and Organization Studies at MIT's Sloan School of Management.

Orlikowski has served as a senior editor for Organization Science, and currently serves on the editorial boards of Information and Organization and Organization Science.

She is a member of the Academy of Management, the Association for Computing Machinery, the Institute of Management Science, the Society of Information Management, and the Society for Organizational Learning.

=== Awards and honors ===
Orlikowski was awarded the 2015 Distinguished Scholar Award by the Organizational Communication and Information Systems (OCIS) Division of the Academy of Management. In 2015, she won the Lasting Impact Award from the ACM CSCW conference for her paper Learning from Notes: Organizational issues in groupware implementation. Orlikowski was named a Fellow of Academy of Management in 2019. She was elected a corresponding Fellow of the British Academy in 2021. In 2022, she was awarded an Honorary Doctorate from the Copenhagen Business School. In 2023, she was awarded the CTO Lifetime Service Award.

=== Research ===
Orlikowski's research examines relations between technology and organizations over time, with emphases on organizing structures, cultural norms, communication genres, and work practices. She is best known for her work in studying the implementation and use of technologies within organisations by drawing on Giddens' Theory of Structuration. Her 1992 paper "The duality of technology: Rethinking the concept of technology in organizations" has been cited over 6200 times, and her subsequent paper in 2000, "Using technology and constituting structures: A practice lens for studying technology in organizations," has received over 5600 citations.

Orlikowski has written extensively on the use of electronic communication technologies, most notably collaborating with JoAnne Yates, a professor of communications at the MIT Sloan School of Management. She has also written papers on research methodology and her 1991 paper with Jack Baroudi in Information Systems Research is particularly widely cited. Her most recent work examines the sociomaterial practices entailed in social media. Her recent collaborations with Susan V. Scott of the London School of Economics have drawn on Karen Barad's Agential Realism and the inseparability of meaning and matter to argue for the inseparability of (digital) materiality and the social.

=== Structurational studies of technology and organizations ===
Structurational studies of technology and organizations have been highly influenced by the social studies of technology. Initially arguing for a view of the "duality of technology," Orlikowski went on to argue for a practice-based understanding of the recursive interaction between people and technologies over time. Orlikowski (2000) argues that emergent structures offer a more generative view of technology use, suggesting that users do not so much appropriate technologies as they enact particular technologies-in-practice with them. The ongoing enactment of technologies-in-practice either reproduce existing structural conditions or they produce changes that may lead to structural transformation.

Based on a series of empirical studies of collaborative technologies (groupware), Orlikowski identified at least three types of enactment produced within different conditions and producing different consequences associated with humans engagement with technology in practice.

- Inertia leads to reinforcement and preservation of structural status quo. Human action with the use of technology tends to be incremental, with people using technology to continue their existing work practices. In the case of collaborative software, reinforcing conditions included rigid career hierarchies, individualistic incentives, and competitive cultures.
- Application which arises as people begin to use the technology in new ways within their work practices. Such use may begin to produce noticeable changes to existing ways of working, including adaptations to the artifacts in use.
- Change, where people integrate the technology into their ways of working in ways that enact important shifts in work practices. Such ongoing changes can over time lead to substantially transformation of the structural status quo.

=== New ways of dealing with materiality in organizational research ===
In more recent work, Orlikowski argues that our primary ways of dealing with materiality in organizational research are conceptually problematic and proposes an alternative approach that posits materiality as constitutive of everyday life. This work draws on Karen Barad's agential realism and the notion of sociomateriality as influenced by the work of Lucy Suchman and Annemarie Mol.

In co-authored work, Orlikowski and Susan Scott of the London School of Economics argue for a focus on sociomaterial practices within organizational and information system studies. This recognizes that all practices are always and everywhere sociomaterial, and that this sociomateriality is constitutive of the contours and possibilities of everyday organizing.

=== Select bibliography ===
Her publications include:

- Levina, N. and W.J. Orlikowski. "Understanding Shifting Power Relations within and across Fields of Practice: A Critical Genre Analysis." Academy of Management Journal, 52, 4, 2009: 672–703. doi:10.5465/amj.2009.43669902
- Orlikowski, W.J. and Scott, S.V. "Sociomateriality: Challenging the Separation of Technology, Work and Organization," Annals of the Academy of Management, 2, 1, 2008: 433-474. doi:10.1080/19416520802211644
- Schultze, U. and W.J. Orlikowski. "Research Commentary—Virtual Worlds: A Performative Perspective on Globally Distributed, Immersive Work" Information Systems Research, 21, 4, 2010: 810-821. doi:10.1287/isre.1100.0321
- Orlikowski, W.J. "The Sociomateriality of Organizational Life: Considering Technology in Management Research." "Cambridge Journal of Economics", 34, 1, 2010: 125-141. doi:10.1093/cje/bep058
- Feldman, M. and W.J. Orlikowski. "Theorizing Practice and Practicing Theory." Organization Science, 22, 5, 2011: 1240-1253. doi:10.1287/orsc.1100.0612
- Orlikowski, W.J. and Scott, S.V. "What Happens when Evaluation Goes Online? Exploring Apparatuses of Valuation in the Travel Sector," Organization Science, 25, 3, 2014: 868-891. doi:10.1287/orsc.2013.0877
