= A Short History of the Catholic Church =

A Short History of the Catholic Church may refer to:

- A Short History of the Catholic Church (1993), book by José Orlandis, ISBN 1-85182-125-2.
- A Short History of the Catholic Church (2010), book by J. Derek Holmes and Bernard Bickers, ISBN 0-86012-308-1.
