= Sex and gender roles in the Catholic Church =

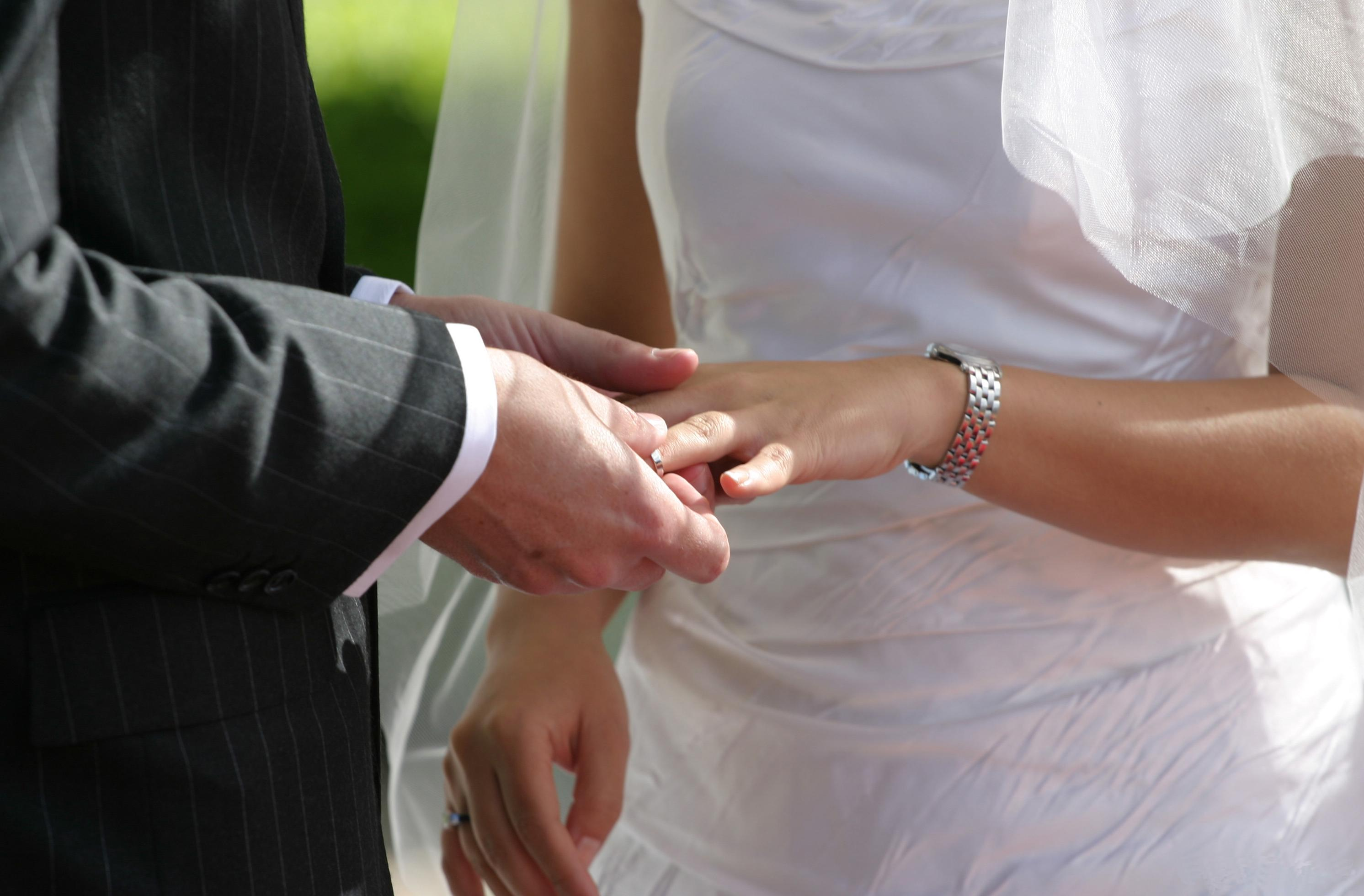
The sixth commandment, according to the USCCB, summons spouses to an emotional and sexual fidelity they call essential to marriage and is reflective of God's fidelity to humanity.

Sex and gender roles in the Roman Catholic Church have been the subject of both intrigue and controversy throughout the Church's history. The cultural influence of the Catholic Church has been vast, particularly upon Western society. Christian concepts, introduced into evangelized societies worldwide by the Church, had a significant impact on established cultural views of sex and gender roles. Human sacrifice, slavery, infanticide and polygamy practiced by cultures such as those of the Roman Empire, Europe, Latin America and parts of Africa came to an end through Church evangelization efforts. Historians note that Catholic missionaries, popes and religious were among the leaders in campaigns against slavery, an institution that has existed in almost every culture and often included sexual slavery of women. Christianity affected the status of women in evangelized cultures like the Roman Empire by condemning infanticide (female infanticide was more common), divorce, incest, polygamy and marital infidelity of both men and women. Some critics say the Church and teachings by St. Paul, the Church Fathers, and scholastic theologians perpetuated a notion that female inferiority was divinely ordained, while current Church teaching considers women and men to be equal, different, and complementary.

Sexual practices of these cultures were affected by the Christian concept of male, female equality. The sexual act, according to the Church, is sacred within the context of the marital relationship that reflects a complete and lifelong mutual gift of a man and a woman. This view of marriage precludes the polygamy and concubinage common to cultures before the arrival of Christianity. The equality of men and women is reflected in the Church teaching that the sexes are meant by divine design to be different and complementary, each having equal dignity and made in the image of God.

== Historical overview ==
=== Roman Empire ===
Social structures at the dawn of Christianity in the Roman Empire held that women were inferior to men intellectually and physically and were "naturally dependent". Athenian women were legally classified as children regardless of age and were the "legal property of some man at all stages in her life." Women in the Roman Empire had limited legal rights and could not enter professions. Female infanticide and abortion were practiced by all classes. In family life, men, not women, could have "lovers, prostitutes and concubines" and it was not rare for pagan women to be married before the age of puberty and then forced to consummate the marriage with her—often much older—husband. Husbands, not wives, could divorce at any time simply by telling the wife to leave. The spread of Christianity changed women's lives in many ways by requiring a man to have only one wife and keep her for life, condemning the infidelity of men as well as women and doing away with marriage of prepubescent girls. Because Christianity outlawed infanticide and because women were more likely than men to convert, there were soon more Christian women than men whereas the opposite was true among pagans.

=== Europe ===
==== Middle Ages ====
The church defined sin as a violation of any law of God, the Bible, or the church. Common sexual sins were premarital sex, adultery, masturbation, homosexuality, and bestiality. Many influential members of the church saw sex and other pleasurable experiences as evil and a source of sin when in the wrong context, unless meant for procreation. Also, any non-vaginal sex (oral, manual, anal) is sinful. The church considered masturbation a sin against nature because the guilty party was extracting sexual pleasure outside of the context of proper use. Also, law required clerics to avoid any sort of sexually tinged entertainment. However, canon law did allow sex in a marriage, as long as it intended to procreate and not just provide pleasure, even though some saw sex, even in marriage, as sinful and impure. Jeffrey Richards describes a European "medieval masculinity which was essentially Christian and chivalric".

Sexual regulation by the church accounted for a great amount of literature and time. The church saw regulation as necessary to maintain the welfare of society. Canon law banned premarital sex, lust, masturbation, adultery, bestiality, homosexuality, and any sort of sex outside of marriage. Adultery was broken up into various categories by the Statutes of Angers: prostitution and simple fornication, adultery, defloration of virgins, intercourse with nuns, incest, homosexuality, and incidental matters relating to sex such as looks, desires, touches, embraces, and kisses. Adultery was typically grounds for divorce for a man if his wife fornicated with another, but adultery was not seen as a crime, just as a sin. Prostitution, although within the category of fornication, was less concrete in the law. Because the medieval canon law originated as an "offshoot of moral theology" but also drew from Roman law, it contributed both legal and moral concepts to canonistic writing. This split influence caused the treatment of prostitution to be more complex. Prostitution, although sinful, was tolerated. Without the availability of a prostitute, men could be led to defloration of a virgin. It was better to tolerate prostitution with all of its associated evils, than to risk the perils which would follow the successful elimination of the harlot from society. The church recognized disordered sexual desire as a natural inclination related to original sin, so sexual desires could not be ignored as a reality. Although the law attempted to strictly regulate prostitution, whorehouses abounded disguised as bathhouses or operated in secret within hotels and private residences. "Outside the official public brothels, prostitution in the public bathhouses, the inns and the taverns was common knowledge and was tolerated. Much of the church's efforts were put toward controlling what was going on sexually in a marriage, especially regarding when a married couple could have sex. Sex was not allowed during pregnancy or menstruation, right after a childbirth, on Sunday, Wednesday, Friday, or Saturday during each of the three Lents, on feast days, quarterly ember days, or before communion. The church also denounced "unnatural" sexual relations between those of the same sex and also married couples. Also, upon marrying, a couple could not enter a church for thirty days.

Although the church developed very strict regulations on sexual activity that needed to be carried out to sustain the institutional and psychological structure of the Middle Ages, it had a hard time properly enforcing these regulations. Most violations occurred in the privacy of the bedroom, so the only witnesses to the sin were the guilty parties themselves, and they did not usually confess to such crimes. Also, the problem was widespread. Not only did the common people deviate from the rules, but the clerics themselves did not follow their own laws. In order to convict, accusation was required, and people did not usually have enough proof to back up an accusation, as law basically required a confession, and there was always a chance that if there was not enough proof, the accuser would be charged with false accusations. Even though the system was not foolproof, the church did produce a large number of institutions to inform the public of the law of sexual practice, and also had an extensive system of courts to deal with sexual misbehavior.

Sexual offenses were punished in a variety of ways during the Middle Ages. There were numerous prosecutions for adultery, fornication, and other sexual offenses, but fornication was the most frequently prosecuted. Fornication was seen as a serious sin and a canonical crime and those convicted were required to "pay fines and court costs", and they were often subject to public humiliation. Public humiliation ranged from public confessions and requesting the forgiveness of the community (often by kneeling at the entrance of a church and begging those who entered for mercy), to public whippings in the churchyard or marketplace, to being paraded around the church "bare-chested and bearing a lighted candle before Sunday Mass". Some offenders were made to wear special clothes while others were flogged. Numerous offenders had to fast or abstain from meat, wine, and sex for a set period of time. Other "punishments [ranged] from the cutting off of hair and pillory to prison and expulsion." Those convicted of more serious sexual offenses were subject to removal from office, confinement in a monastery, or a forced pilgrimage.

Not all punishments were equal; punishments for sexual crimes differed between genders and social classes. When convicted of adultery, it was more likely that males would be fined in church courts rather than publicly flogged like the convicted females. However, when the males began to be more strictly punished, the punishment for females also became more severe. While males were now publicly whipped, females had their heads shaved and were subject to expulsion from their homes, separation from their children, and the confiscation of their dowry. The wounds of the male would heal over time, but the woman was reduced to "penury". She would often be forced to live in poverty for the remainder of her life. In one case, a woman was accused of sleeping around and was ordered to rid herself of guilt in front of seven witnesses. Her male counterpart, however, was subject to no punishment whatsoever. When a woman of a higher social status was convicted of the same crime, she was not required to purge herself of her guilt in front of any witnesses. The woman of a higher social class was allowed to repent in private. Common prostitutes of the time period were banned from churches, but there was little to no prosecution of their "male clientele". However, the priests of the higher classes were punished most severely for sexual crimes. They were stripped of their rank, position, and income. The wife and children of the priest were thrown out of their house, and the priests could be thrown in a monastery for the remainder of their lives and their wife and children enslaved.

=== Latin America ===
It was women, primarily Amerindian Christian converts, who became the primary supporters of the Church. Slavery and human sacrifice were both part of Latin American culture before the Europeans arrived. Spanish conquerors enslaved and sexually abused Indian women on a regular basis. Indian slavery was first abolished by Pope Paul III in the 1537 bull Sublimis Deus which confirmed that "their souls were as immortal as those of Europeans" and they should neither be robbed nor turned into slaves. While the Spanish military was known for its ill-treatment of Amerindian men and women, Catholic missionaries are credited with championing all efforts to initiate protective laws for the Indians and fought against their enslavement.

The missionaries in Latin America felt that the Indians tolerated too much nudity and required them to wear clothes if they lived at the missions. Common Indian sexual practices such as premarital sex, adultery, polygamy, and incest were quickly deemed immoral by the missionaries and prohibited with mixed results. Indians who did not agree to these new rules either left the missions or actively rebelled. Women's roles were sometimes reduced to exclude tasks previously performed by women in religious ceremonies or society.

=== Africa ===
By and large the largest obstacle to evangelization of Africans was the widespread nature of polygamy among the various populations. Africa was initially evangelized by Catholic monks of medieval Europe, and then by both Protestants and Catholics from the seventeenth century onward. Each of these evangelizing groups complained "incessantly" about African marriage customs. Priestly celibacy is often reported as a problem in Africa today, where "large numbers of priests feel celibacy is simply incompatible with African culture." "It is widely reported that priests routinely live double lives, keeping "secret" families in homes far from their parishes."

=== Mexico ===
During the time Spain owned Mexico (pre-independence) Mexico adopted the style of Spain's Catholicism where women were normatively established as weak. "During the beginning of church history ecclesiastical authorities found in the creative fashioning of gendered language an important means by which to reaffirm the patriarchal norms that underlay the institution's power and authority". In the case of the patriarchal system that developed over many centuries in the Church, normative definitions of masculinity and femininity took on added significance as guarantors of institutional stability which ensured the ongoing functioning of the institution, but, when contested or undermined, threatened the entire sacred enterprise. Women were "excluded from the public sphere [of the church] and held in the private realm of home and family life"; "the Church, the school, and the family all converged in assigning women this role."

In Mexico during 1807, people "cited women's behavior as a root cause of social problems" and thought that it would lead to the break-down of New Spain. In this time period women were inferior to men and the inequality of gender was used as a source of power in their sermons. In colonial and early-independent Mexico, male archbishops would use language "that either explicitly invoked patriarchal social norms or creatively reinforced them through adaptations of tropes of masculinity and femininity". Studies show how "the Church likewise played a role in shaping women's marriage choices, both through canonical rules of consanguinity among marriage partners and by means of the ostensible limits imposed by its expectation that marriage be contracted freely by both parties".

During the Cold War, the influence of communism "became a central political battle and a common cause for the Church and the Mexican Women". Prior to the Cold War, women were confined to the private sphere in the homes of the family. "In the face of an alleged Communist ideological offensive, [this notion of women being confined to the private sphere] became an issue of public concern", As a result, women "created new forms of political participation, and they acquired an unprecedented sense of political competence" as well as involvement in the church. Women were "made aware of their own potential in the public sphere".

A common woman-figure in the Mexican Catholic Church was "derived from the position of the Virgin Mary, or from her more vernacular representation, the Virgin of Guadalupe." The Virgin Mary was held as a "role model" for women and young girls and was distinguished for her "passivity, self-denial, abnegation and chastity." The Church disseminated a religious, maternal, and spiritual role component of the Virgin Mary "that governed attitudes and symbols sustaining women's status."

==== Women of Nahua ====
The indigenous Nahua women in colonial times were significantly noted for their lack of power and authority in their roles compared to men in the realm of the Catholic Church in Mexican society. It is seen that "Nahua women's religious responsibilities in Mexico City lay between the officially recognized positions of men in the public arena and women's private responsibilities in the home." They were denied the officially sanctioned power that should have actually been offered to the Nahua women. Their lack of authority resulted in occasional outbreaks in violence due to frustration. "In at least one-fourth of the cases, women led the attacks and were visibly more aggressive in their behavior toward outside authorities." And they were unable to become nuns in the Catholic Church society. The women were only to "be recipients of God’s divine favor and protection if they followed the tenets of the Catholic Church"; the rules and regulations for women were evidently more strict and rigid than those for men.

==== Women of Vela Perpetua ====
There is specific evidence for a woman-dominated, church-oriented organization called The Ladies of the Vela Perpetua. This "predominantly female lay organization whose central purpose is to keep vigil over the Blessed Sacrament overnight" was a unique because of "its implicit challenge to the Church's rigidly hierarchical gender ideology: the constitution of the Vela Perpetua mandated that women, and only women, were to serve as the officers of this mixed-sex, lay, devotional organization." Scholars suspect that the woman-led organization "was predominately found in the small towns and cities of the central-western states of Guanajuato, Michoacán ́and Jalisco (a part of Mexico known as the Baj ́io)." During this time, "female leadership meant something virtually unheard of in Catholic lay societies: women were in a position to 'govern men'." Even though Vela Perpetua was founded in 1840, their reverse gender role legacy was neither celebrated nor recognized until much later in time.

According to research form scholars, "We do not and cannot know for certain who first conceived the idea of the female-led Vela Perpetua." However, it is known that this institution was composed of devout mothers, grandmothers and great-grandmothers alike. These ladies brought a sense of "feminization" that they had been historically denied in the realm of the Catholic Church which surrounded their lives. Because the sense of social and religious freedom that was provided, others in surrounding communities "looked to the Vela as a way to support the Church and to claim a kind of religious citizenship – greater equality and greater power within the Church." Some men were angered over these non-traditional church ways and "four years [after the Vela Perpetua was founded] the first separate Vela for men was founded." Despite the creation of a separate Vela for men, "several of the women's Velas were singled out for praise by the bishop for their efficient organization."

== Official Church teaching on marital love and sexual matters ==
According to the Church, humans are sexual beings whose sexual identity extends beyond the body to the mind and spirit. The sexes are meant by divine design to be different and complementary, each having equal dignity and made in the image of God. The sexual act is sacred within the context of the marital relationship and reflects a complete and lifelong mutual gift of a man and a woman. Sexual sins thus violate not just the body but the person's whole being. In his 1995 book Crossing the Threshold of Hope, John Paul II reflected on this concept by stating,

Young people are always searching for the beauty in love. They want their love to be beautiful. If they give in to weakness, following the models of behavior that can rightly be considered a "scandal in the contemporary world" (and these are, unfortunately, widely diffused models), in the depths of their hearts they still desire a beautiful and pure love. This is as true of boys as it is of girls. Ultimately, they know that only God can give them this love. As a result, they are willing to follow Christ, without caring about the sacrifices this may entail.

=== Sexual morality ===
The Catholic Church teaches that human life and human sexuality are inseparable. Because Catholics believe that God created human beings in his own image and likeness and that he found everything he created to be "very good", the Church teaches that the human body and sex must likewise be good. The Church considers the expression of love between husband and wife to be an elevated form of human activity, joining as it does husband and wife in complete mutual self-giving, and opening their relationship to new life. "The sexual activity in which husband and wife are intimately and chastely united with one another, through which human life is transmitted, is, as the recent Council recalled, 'noble and worthy'.”

The Church teaches that sexual intercourse has a purpose, fulfilled only in marriage. According to the catechism, "conjugal love ... aims at a deeply personal unity, a unity that, beyond union in one flesh, leads to forming one heart and soul" since the marriage bond is to be a sign of the love between God and humanity.

==== Vocation to chastity ====
Church teaching on the sixth commandment includes discussion about chastity. The Catechism calls it a "moral virtue ... a gift from God, a grace, a fruit of spiritual effort." Because the Church sees sex as more than just a physical act, an act that affects both body and spirit, it teaches that chastity is a virtue all people are called to acquire. It is defined as the inner unity of a person's "bodily and spiritual being" that successfully integrates a person's sexuality with his or her "entire human nature". To acquire this virtue one is encouraged to enter into the "long and exacting work" of self-mastery that is helped by friendships, God's grace, maturity, and education "that respects the moral and spiritual dimensions of human life." The Catechism categorizes violations of the sixth commandment into two categories: "offenses against chastity" and "offenses against the dignity of marriage".

==== Offenses against chastity ====
The Catechism lists the following "offenses against chastity" in increasing order of gravity, according to Kreeft:

1. Lust: the Church teaches that sexual pleasure is good and created by God who meant for spouses to "experience pleasure and enjoyment of body and spirit." Lust does not mean sexual pleasure as such, nor the delight in it, nor the desire for it in its right context. Lust is the desire for pleasure of sex apart from its intended purpose of procreation and the uniting of man and woman, body and spirit, in mutual self-donation.
2. Masturbation is considered sinful for the same reasons as lust but is a step above lust in that it involves also a physical act.
3. Fornication is the sexual union of an unmarried man and an unmarried woman. This is considered contrary to the dignity of persons and of human sexuality because it is not ordered to the good of spouses or the procreation of children.
4. Pornography ranks yet higher on the scale in gravity of sinfulness because it is considered a perversion of the sexual act which is intended for distribution to third parties for viewing. Also it is often produced without free, adult consent.
5. Prostitution is sinful for both the prostitute and the customer; it reduces a person to an instrument of sexual pleasure, violating human dignity and harming society as well. The gravity of the sinfulness is less for prostitutes who are forced into the act by destitution, blackmail, or social pressure.
6. Rape is an intrinsically evil act that can cause grave damage to the victim for life.
7. Incest, or "rape of children by parents or other adult relatives" or "those responsible for the education of the children entrusted to them" is considered the most heinous of sexual sins.

=== Love of husband and wife ===
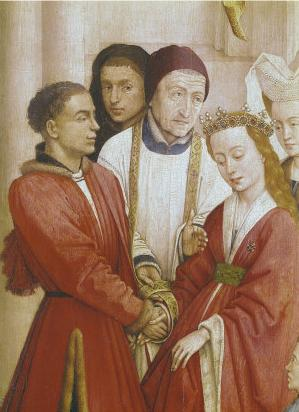
Matrimony, The Seven Sacraments, Rogier van der Weyden, c. 1445.

Spousal love, according to Church teaching, is meant to achieve an unbroken, twofold end: union of husband and wife as well as transmission of life. The unitive aspect includes a person's whole being that calls spouses to grow in love and fidelity "so that they are no longer two but one flesh." The sacrament of matrimony is viewed as God's sealing of spousal consent to the gift of themselves to each other. Church teaching on the marital state requires spousal acceptance of each other's failures and faults and the recognition that the "call to holiness in marriage" is one that requires a process of spiritual growth and conversion that lasts throughout life.

=== Fecundity of marriage, sexual pleasure, birth control ===
Throughout Church history, various Catholic thinkers have offered differing opinions on sexual pleasure. Some saw it as sinful, while others disagreed. There was no formal Church position in the matter until the 1546 Council of Trent decided that "concupiscence" invited sin but was "not formally sinful in itself". In 1679, Pope Innocent XI also weighed in by condemning "marital sex exercised for pleasure alone". The Church position on sexual activity can be summarized as: "sexual activity belongs only in marriage as an expression of total self-giving and union, and always open to the possibility of new life". Sexual acts in marriage are considered "noble and honorable" and are meant to be enjoyed with "joy and gratitude".

The existence of artificial methods of birth control predates Christianity; the Catholic Church as well as all Christian denominations condemned artificial methods of birth control throughout their respective histories. This began to change in the 20th century when the Church of England became the first to accept the practice in 1930. The Catholic Church responded to this new development by issuing the papal encyclical Casti connubii on 31 December 1930. The 1968 papal encyclical Humanae vitae is a reaffirmation of the Catholic Church's traditional view of marriage and marital relations and a continued condemnation of artificial birth control.

The Church encourages large families and sees this as a blessing. It also recognizes that responsible parenthood sometimes calls for reasonable spacing or limiting of births and thus considers natural family planning as morally acceptable but rejects all methods of artificial contraception. The Church rejects all forms of artificial insemination and fertilization because such techniques divorce the sexual act from the creation of a child. The Catechism states, "A child is not something owed to one, but is a gift, … 'the supreme gift of marriage'."

Rejecting Church support for natural family planning as a viable form of birth control, some Church members and non-members criticize Church teachings that oppose artificial birth control as outdated and as contributing to overpopulation, and poverty. The Church's rejection of the use of condoms is especially criticized with respect to countries where the incidence of AIDS and HIV has reached epidemic proportions. In countries like Kenya and Uganda, where behavioral changes are encouraged alongside condom use, greater progress in controlling the disease has been made than in those countries solely promoting condoms. Cardinal Christoph Schönborn is among the higher clergy who have allowed for the use of condoms by someone suffering from AIDS, as a "lesser evil".

=== Gender identity ===
In "Male and female he created them: toward a path of dialogue on the question of gender identity in education", the Congregation for Catholic Education states that sex and gender can be seen as distinct concepts, but should not be considered independent of one another, and that the church does not approve of the concept of gender identity or the ideology that follows from it. The congregation explains that men are men and male and that women are women and female due to their sex chromosomes, and that hermaphrodites and people confused about their sex ought to receive medical assistance rather than be treated as a third gender or genderless. The Church also explains that Catholics must not unjustly discriminate against transgender people; an example of just discrimination is exclusion from ordination since the church sees transgender men as women and transgender women as men unfit for the priesthood.

=== Priesthood, religious life, celibacy ===
In the Catholic Church, only men may become ordained clergy through the sacrament of Holy Orders, as bishops, priests or deacons. All clergy who are bishops form the College of Bishops and are considered the successors of the apostles. (Note: Only bishops can administer the sacrament of Holy Orders; and, in the Latin Rite, Confirmation is ordinarily reserved to them. Bishops are responsible for teaching and governing the faithful of their diocese, sharing these duties with the priests and deacons who serve under them. Only priests and bishops may celebrate the Eucharist and administer the sacraments of Penance and Anointing of the Sick. They and deacons may preach, teach, baptize, witness marriages and conduct funeral services. Baptism is normally performed by clergy but is the only sacrament that may be administered in emergencies by any Catholic or even a non-Christian "who has the intention of baptizing according to the belief of the Catholic Church". Married men may become deacons, but only celibate men can ordinarily be ordained as priests in the Latin Rite. Married clergymen who have converted to the Church from other denominations are sometimes exempted from this rule. The Eastern Catholic Churches ordain both celibate and married men. All rites of the Catholic Church maintain the ancient tradition that marriage is not allowed after ordination. Men with transitory homosexual leanings may be ordained deacons following three years of prayer and chastity, but homosexual men who are sexually active, or those who have deeply rooted homosexual tendencies cannot be ordained.)

The Church practice of celibacy is based on Jesus' example and his teaching as given in Matthew 19:11–12, as well as the writings of St. Paul who spoke of the advantages celibacy allowed a man in serving the Lord. Celibacy was "held in high esteem" from the Church's beginnings. It is considered a kind of spiritual marriage with Christ, a concept further popularized by the early Christian theologian Origen. Clerical celibacy began to be demanded in the 4th century, including papal decretals beginning with Pope Siricius. In the 11th century, mandatory celibacy was enforced as part of efforts to reform the medieval church.

The Catholic view is that since the twelve apostles chosen by Jesus were all male, only men may be ordained in the Catholic Church. While some consider this to be evidence of a discriminatory attitude toward women, the Church believes that Jesus called women to different yet equally important vocations in Church ministry. Pope John Paul II, in his apostolic letter Christifideles Laici, states that women have specific vocations reserved only for the female sex, and are equally called to be disciples of Jesus. This belief in different and complementary roles between men and women is exemplified in Pope Paul VI's statement "If the witness of the Apostles founds the Church, the witness of women contributes greatly towards nourishing the faith of Christian communities."

=== Role of women ===
Official Church teaching considers women and men to be equal and "complementary". A special role and devotion is accorded to Jesus' mother Mary as "nurturing mother" of Christ and the Church. Marian devotion has been a central theme of Catholic art, and motherhood and family are given a sacred status in church teachings. Conversely, the role of Eve in the Biblical story of the Garden of Eden affected the development of a Western notion of woman as "temptress". Unusually for his epoch, Jesus preached to men and women alike. St. Paul had much to say about women and about ecclesiastical directives for women. Based on a reading of the Gospels that Christ selected only male Apostles, the Church does not ordain women to the priesthood (see above). Nevertheless, throughout history, women have achieved significant influence in the running of Catholic institutions – particularly in hospitals and schooling, through religious orders of nuns or sisters like the Benedictines, Dominicans, Loreto Sisters, Sisters of Mercy, Little Sisters of the Poor, Josephites, and Missionaries of Charity. Pope Francis has been noted for his efforts to recognize feminine gifts and to increase the presence of women in high offices in the Church.

== Spiritual affection ==
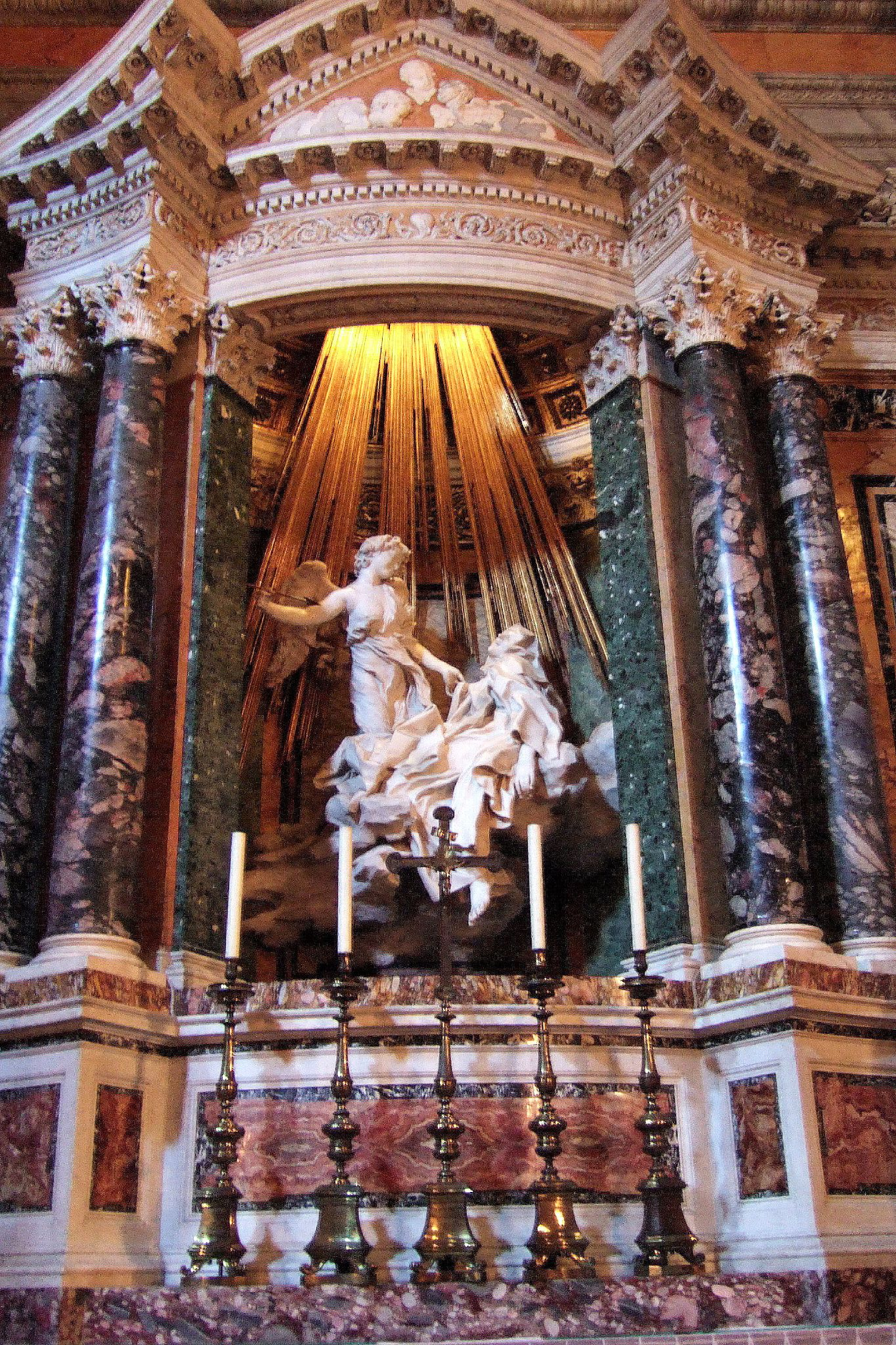
The Ecstasy of St Theresa in the basilica of Santa Maria della Vittoria, Rome, by Italian baroque artist Gianlorenzo Bernini

Spiritual affection has long been documented in various lives of the saints. Biographies of Thomas Aquinas, Teresa of Avila, Martin de Porres, Joseph of Cupertino, and many others include episodes of spiritual affection witnessed both by those who knew the saint or confessed by the saints themselves in their own writings. In Saint Teresa's Life for instance, she describes what has become known as the Ecstasy of Saint Theresa:

The loving exchange that takes place between the soul and God is so sweet that I beg Him in His goodness to give a taste of his love to anyone who thinks I am lying. On certain days I went about as though stupefied. I desired neither to see nor to speak, but to clasp my suffering close to me, for to me it was greater glory than all creation. Sometimes it happened – when the Lord desired – that these raptures were so great that even though I was among people I couldn't resist them; to my deep affliction they began to made public."

== See also ==
- Theology of the Body
- Women in the Catholic Church

== Bibliography ==
- Brundage, James (1987). Law, Sex, and Christian Society in Medieval Europe. Chicago: University of Chicago. ISBN 978-0-226-07784-0.
- ——; Nelson, Janet; Linehan, Peter (2001). Sin, Crime and the Pleasures of the Flesh: the Medieval Church Judges Sexual Offences. London: Routledge. pp. 294–305. ISBN 978-0-415-18151-8.
- ——; Ziolkowski, Jan (1998). Obscene and Lascivious. Brill. ISBN 978-90-04-10928-5.
- ——; Murray, Jacqueline; Eisenbichler, Konrad (1996a). "Playing by the Rules: Sexual Behavior and Legal Norms in Medieval Europe". Desire and Discipline: Sex and Sexuality in the Premodern West. Toronto: University of Toronto. doi:10.3138/9781442673854-004. ISBN 978-0-8020-7144-6.
- —— (1996b). Bullough, Vern L.; Brundage, James (eds.). "Sex and Canon Law". Handbook of Medieval Sexuality: 33–50.
- —— (nd). "Canonical Courts and Procedure". Medieval Canon.
- —— (1976). "Prostitution in the Medieval Canon Law". Chicago Journals: 825–845.
- Bokenkotter, Thomas (2004). A Concise History of the Catholic Church. Doubleday. ISBN 978-0-385-50584-0.
- Chadwick, Owen (1995). A History of Christianity. Barnes & Noble. ISBN 978-0-7607-7332-1.
- Duffy, Eamon (1997). Saints and Sinners, a History of the Popes. Yale University Press. ISBN 978-0-300-07332-4.
- Dussel, Enrique (1981). A History of the Church in Latin America. Wm. B. Eerdmans. ISBN 978-0-8028-2131-7.
- Ferro, Mark (1997). Colonization: A Global History. Routledge. ISBN 978-0-415-14007-2.
- Froehle, Bryan; Mary Gautier (2003). Global Catholicism, Portrait of a World Church. Orbis books; Center for Applied Research in the Apostolate, Georgetown University. ISBN 978-1-57075-375-6.
- Hastings, Adrian (2004). The Church in Africa 1450–1950. Oxford University Press. ISBN 978-0-19-826399-9.
- Hunter, David (2007). "Sexuality, marriage and the family". Sexuality, Marriage, and the Family. Vol. 2. Cambridge History of Christianity. pp. 585–600. doi:10.1017/chol9780521812443.026. ISBN 9781139054133.
- Johansen, Bruce (2006). The Native Peoples of North America. Rutgers University Press. ISBN 978-0-8135-3899-0.
- Kelly, Henry Ansgar (April 2000). "Bishop, Prioress, and Bawd in the Stews of Southwark". Speculum. 75 (2): 342–388. doi:10.2307/2887582. JSTOR 2887582. S2CID 162696212.
- Koschorke, Klaus; Ludwig, Frieder; Delgado, Mariano (2007). A History of Christianity in Asia, Africa, and Latin America, 1450–1990. Wm B Eerdmans Publishing Co. ISBN 978-0-8028-2889-7.
- Le Goff, Jacques (2000). Medieval Civilization. Barnes & Noble. ISBN 978-0-7607-1652-6.
- Lehner, Ulrich L. (2017). Women, Enlightenment and Catholicism. Routledge. ISBN 978-1138687639.
- Noble, Thomas; Strauss, Barry (2005). Western Civilization. Houghton Mifflin Company. ISBN 978-0-618-43277-6.
- Noll, Mark (2006). The Civil War as a Theological Crisis. University of North Carolina Press. ISBN 978-0-8078-3012-3.
- Orlandis, Jose (1993). A Short History of the Catholic Church. Scepter Publishers. ISBN 978-1-85182-125-9.
- John Paul II, Pope (1995). Crossing the Threshold of Hope. Alfred A. Knopf, Inc. ISBN 978-0-679-76561-5.
- Payer, Pierre; Joyce Salisbury (1991). Sex and Confession in the 13th Century. New York: Garland Pub. pp. 127+. ISBN 978-0-8240-5766-4.
- Posner, Richard (1994). Sex and Reason. Harvard University Press. ISBN 978-0-674-80280-3.
- Rossiaud, Jacques (1988). Medieval Prostitution. Blackwell. ISBN 978-0-631-19992-2.
- Schreck, Alan (1999). The Essential Catholic Catechism. Servant Publications. ISBN 978-1-56955-128-8.
- Stark, Rodney (1996). The Rise of Christianity. Princeton University Press. ISBN 978-0-691-02749-4.
- Stearns, Peter (2000). Gender in World History. Routledge. ISBN 978-0-415-22310-2.
- Thomas, Hugh (1999). The Slave Trade: The Story of the Atlantic Slave Trade, 1440-1870. Simon and Schuster. ISBN 978-0-684-83565-5.
- Woods Jr, Thomas (2005). How the Catholic Church Built Western Civilization. Regnery Publishing, Inc. ISBN 978-0-89526-038-3.
- USCCB (United States Conference of Catholic Bishops) (2008). United States Catechism for Adults. USCCB Publishing. ISBN 978-1-57455-450-2.
