= François Regnault =

French philosopher, playwright and dramaturg

François Regnault (French: [ʁəɲo]; born 1938) is a French philosopher, playwright and dramaturg. Also a university instructor and teacher, Regnault was maître de conférences at Paris VIII before his retirement. Among his various writings he is the author, with Jean-Claude Milner, of the seminal Dire le vers and of Conférences d'esthétique lacanienne.

== Education ==
Born in Paris, Regnault studied philosophy at the Lycée Louis-Le-Grand, and then the École Normale Supérieure (ENS) beginning in 1962 where he attended the seminars of Louis Althusser.

== Psychoanalysis ==
At ENS, he attended the seminars of Jacques Lacan and was a member of the editorial board of Cahiers pour l'Analyse beginning with its inception in 1966. Regnault taught at the Lycée de Reims from 1964–70, where he became a close friend of another philosopher and playwright, Alain Badiou. In 1970, Regnault joined the Department of Philosophy (headed by Michel Foucault) at the then newly founded University of Paris VIII (Vincennes). In 1974, he moved to Paris VIII's Department of Psychoanalysis.

Since the early 1970s Regnault's work expanded to include, alongside philosophy and psychoanalysis, a practical involvement in theatre. Coming from a family with theatrical connections, he has sustained an interest in the theatre, including many translations. In 1973 he translated Tankred Dorst’s Toller (1968) for Patrice Chéreau. Later, he translated among other well-known works: Henrik Ibsen’s Peer Gynt and J.M. Synge’s Playboy of the Western World. But never drifting far from his initial interest in Lacan, Regnault joined the editorial board of Ornicar? in 1975 and began to publish articles there (and elsewhere) on Lacanian psychoanalysis and aesthetics.

== Theater ==
Working as a theorist, dramaturg, and playwright, Regnault also co-directed the Théâtre de la Commune at Aubervilliers from 1991 to 1997, and from 1994 to 2001 he taught diction at the Conservatoire National d’Art dramatique in Paris. As a brief explanation of his work and life, Regnault says in a short autobiographical note that whether he is writing on psychoanalysis or working in theatrical aesthetics, it is a double field which shares the subject: Lacan's teaching and the love of theater.

== Select bibliography ==
- ‘Qu’est-ce qu’une coupure épistémologique?’, lecture of 26 February 1968 for Louis Althusser’s ‘Philosophy Course for Scientists’. Notes on the lecture were published as ‘Définitions’, in Michel Pêcheux and Michel Fichant, Sur l’histoire des sciences. Paris: Maspero, 1969.
- ‘Meditations sur la Somme’. Ornicar? 2 (March 1975).
- ‘Le sujet de la science et la fantasme du monde’. Ornicar? 5 (winter 1975).
- ‘Dickens, le théâtre et la psychanalyse’. Ornicar? 17/18 (spring 1979).
- ‘Entretiens sur les mariages, la sexualité, et les trois fonctions’. Roundtable with Claude Dumézil, Joël Grisward, Alain Grosrichard, Jacques-Alain Miller and Jean-Claude Milner. Ornicar? 19 (autumn 1979).
- ‘Système formel d’Hitchcock’. Cahiers du cinéma, ‘Hitchcock’, hors-série 8 (1980).
- ‘De deux dieux’. Ornicar? 24 (1981).
- ‘Usages et mésusages de Lacan’. Ornicar? 36 (1986).
- Dire le vers, with Jean-Claude Milner. Paris: Seuil, 1987; Verdier, 2008.
- Conférences d’esthétique lacanienne. Paris: Agalma, 1997.
- ‘Vos paroles m’ont frappé’. Ornicar? 49 (1998).
- ‘Du comme ça au just so’. Ornicar? 49 (1998).
- L’Une des trois unités. Paris: Isele, 1999.
- Théâtre-Équinoxes. Paris: Actes Sud, 2001.
- Théâtre-Solstices. Paris: Actes Sud, 2002.
- Notre objet a. Paris: Verdier, 2003.
- ‘Le Marx de Lacan’ [2005]. Compte-rendu of a seminar at the École de la cause freudienne. In Lettre mensuelle de l’ECF 242, online at
- 'Presentation' (c. 2008), on line at

=== In English translation ===
- ‘Lacan and Experience’. In Lacan and the Human Sciences, ed. Alexandre Leupin. Lincoln & London: University of Nebraska, 1991.
- ‘The Name-of-the-Father’. In Reading Seminar XI: Lacan’s Four Fundamental Concepts of Psychoanalysis, ed. Richard Feldstein, Maire Jaanus, & Bruce Fink. Albany: SUNY, 1995.
- ‘Art after Lacan’, trans. B.P. Fulks & J. Jauregui. lacanian ink 19 (2002).
- ‘Ethics and the Theatre’, trans. B.P. Fulks & J. Jauregui. lacanian ink 21 (2003).
- ‘Saintliness and Sainthood’, trans. P. Bradley. lacanian ink 33 (2009).
- 'I Was Struck by What You Said...', trans. A. Price. Hurly-Burly 6 (2011).
