= Technofeminism =

Type of feminism exploring the role gender plays in technology

Technofeminism is a theoretical and practical framework that explores the intersections between technology, gender, and power. Rooted in feminist thought, it critically examines how technology shapes, reinforces, or disrupts gender inequalities and seeks to envision more equitable futures through technological design and use.

The term is widely attributed to Judy Wajcman, a sociologist and feminist scholar. Wajcman introduced the concept in her influential 2004 book, TechnoFeminism.

Historically, technofeminism is closely linked to cyberfeminism, a concept which emerged in the early 1990s. The origins of cyber- and technofeminism are strongly attributed to the references of Donna Haraway's A Cyborg Manifesto. Since the 1990s, numerous feminist movements developed, addressing feminism and technology in various ways, and through different perspectives. Networks, ideas and concepts can overlap.

Technofeminism is often examined in conjunction with intersectionality, a term coined by Kimberlé Crenshaw which analyzes the relationships among various identities, such as race, socioeconomic status, sexuality, gender, and more.

== TechnoFeminism book ==
=== Overview ===
TechnoFeminism
- Author: Judy Wajcman
- Language: English
- Genre: Academic
- Publisher: Polity Press
- Publication date: 2004
- Publication place: United Kingdom
- Media type: Print (hardback & paperback), e-book)
- Pages: 148
- ISBN: 0-7456-3043-X

TechnoFeminism is a book by academic sociologist Judy Wajcman which reframes the relationship between gender and technologies, and presents a feminist reading of the woman-machine relationship. It argues against a technocratic ideology, posing instead a thesis of society and technology being mutually constitutive. She supports this with examples of feminist history related to reproductive technologies and automation. It is considered a key contributor to the rise of feminist technoscience as a field.

Reception

According to a review in the American Journal of Sociology, Wajcman convincingly argues that "analyses of everything from transit systems to pap smears must include a technofeminist awareness of men's and women's often different positions as designers, manufacturing operatives, salespersons, purchasers, profiteers, and embodied users of such technologies."

In the journal Science, Technology and Human Values, Sally Wyatt notes that the "theoretical insights from feminist technoscience (can and should) be useful for empirical research as well as for political change and action" and that one way of moving towards this is "return to production and work as research sites because so much work in recent years has focused on consumption, identity, and representation."

Editions

Adding to the print edition, which has been reprinted several times, E-book editions of TechnoFeminism were released in 2013. The book has been translated into Spanish as El Tecnofeminismo.

== Academic contexts ==
Scholars have spoken out about the lack of technofeminist scholarship, especially in the context of overarching technological research.

A primary concern of technofeminism is the relationship between historical and societal norms, and technology design and implementation. Technofeminist scholars actively work to illuminate the often unnoticed inequities ingrained in systems and come up with solutions to combat them. They also research how technology can be used for positive ends, especially for marginalized groups.

== See also ==
- Digital rhetoric
- Feminist technoscience
- Cyberfeminism
