= 500A =

500A may refer to:

- Alfa Romeo 500A
- Florida State Road 500A
