= Orlandi =

Orlandi or the House of Orlandi were the prominent medieval Pisan family.

Orlandi also may refer to:

== Other people ==
- Andrea Orlandi (born 1984), Spanish footballer
- Carlo Orlandi (1910–1983), Italian boxer and Olympian
- Carlo Orlandi (rugby player) (born 1967), Italian former rugby union player and coach
- Deodato Orlandi (died before 1331), Italian painter of Medieval art
- Elisa Orlandi (1811–1834), Italian opera singer
- Emanuela Orlandi (born 1968), Vatican girl who disappeared in 1983
- Emanuele Orlandi (born 1988), Italian footballer, currently playing for Carrarese
- Eni Orlandi, Brazilian researcher
- Felice Orlandi (1925–2003), Italian-born American actor
- Ferdinando Orlandi (1774–1848), Italian composer
- Flavio Orlandi (1921–2009), Italian politician
- Giovanni Orlandi (fl. 1590–1640), Italian engraver and print publisher
- Ivo Orlandi (1923–2000), Venezuelan Olympic sports shooter
- José Orlandis (1918–2010), Spanish priest and historian
- Juan Pablo Orlandi (born 1983), Argentinian rugby union footballer, currently playing for Racing Métro
- Nazzareno Orlandi (1861–1952), Italian-Argentine painter
- Nevio Orlandi (born 1954), Italian football manager
- Nora Orlandi (1933–2025), Italian pianist, violinist, soprano vocalist, composer, and occasional actress
- Pellegrino Antonio Orlandi (1660–1727), Italian writer and art historian
- Rita Orlandi-Malaspina (1937–2017), Italian opera singer
- Stefano Orlandi (1681–1760), Italian painter
- Ugo Orlandi (born 1958), Italian musicologist, university professor and mandolinist
- Vittorio Orlandi (born 1938), Italian show jumping rider

== See also ==
- José Orlandis (1918–2010), Spanish Roman Catholic priest, historian and author
