= Sociomateriality =

Organizational theory

Sociomateriality is a theory built upon the intersection of technology, work and organization, that attempts to understand "the constitutive entanglement of the social and the material in everyday organizational life." It is the result of considering how human bodies, spatial arrangements, physical objects, and technologies are entangled with language, interaction, and practices in organizing. Specifically, it examines the social and material aspects of technology and organization, but also emphasizes the centrality of materials within the communicative constitution of organizations. It offers a novel way to study technology at the workplace, since it allows researchers to study the social and the material simultaneously.

It was introduced after legacies of contingency theory and structuration theory had characterized the field of Information System research in Management Studies. Early papers by Wanda Orlikowski feature structuration theory and practice theory. However, the key papers for sociomateriality stem from the later work of Orlikowski in collaboration with Susan Scott. The concept adopted the focus on relations from Bruno Latour's and John Law's actor-network theory (ANT) and further opposes the Kantian dualism of subject and object drawing on Karen Barad's and Lucy Suchman's feminist studies. Drawing on Barad, sociomateriality proposes the concept of agential realism. Key aspects of sociomateriality are according to Matthew Jones a relational understanding of the world, the observation of day-to-day technology use at the workplace during practices and the inextricability and inseparability of the social and the material.

== History ==
Huber made a fundamental point that as more sophisticated technologies are adopted, they will have profound effects on organizational design and decision-making. From the 1990s onward, it was clear that because of a variety of information and communication technologies being adopted in the workplace, consideration of sociality and materiality in tandem would be met with increasing significance and academic attention. As was pointedly expressed by Barad, 'Language matters. Discourse matters. Culture matters. But there is an important sense in which the only thing that does not seem to matter anymore is matter.' This critical statement is representative of not only the research most scholars in this field do focus on, but pushes forward what they are missing as a result: matter, or, the material. In directing attention toward the material, the theory of sociomateriality was generated.

Early scholars like Joan Woodward and Charles Perrow were bearing a deterministic point of view in their study, and consider the materiality of technologies to be the sole cause of organizational changes. That first generation of research was conducted at a macro-level, with organizations as their unit of analysis. The following strand started looking at individuals as their subject of analysis, and as such, many informal aspects of organizational studies were also taken into account. That marked the emergence of social aspects appearing in scholarly papers about organizational technology—terms like ‘technology-in use’ and ‘socio-technological ensembles’. This stream of thought takes a constructivist position. This position believes that the material features of technology does not matter too much, rather, the way people interpret technology holds the most significance. Both technological determinism and constructivism falls short in describing the whole picture of the relationship between technology and organizations. Then, scholars like Poole and DeSanctis, Monteiro and Hanseth, and Griffith started drawing attention toward technology's material features. Only then did it come to the "materiality" point-of-view, which is to say, the physical properties of technology drove workplace actions. However, the sole use of materiality to describe workplace technology also falls short in describing the whole picture.

Leonardi explains the reason for sociomateriality's existence: '(a) that all materiality (as defined in the prior section) is social in that it was created through social processes and it is interpreted and used in social contexts and (b) that all social action is possible because of some materiality' (p. 32). The emergence of the term “sociomateriality” is a sign of progress over "materiality", in the way that it recognizes that materiality constitutes the social world and the social world also influences technological materiality. Here, “social” could be institutions, norms, discourses, and other human intentions.

Given the growing popularity of materiality and sociomateriality in management and organization theories (e.g. Carlile, Nicolini, Langley, Tsoukas, 2013; Jarzabkowski, Spee & Smets, 2013; Leonardi & Barley), sociomateriality has become "trendy" for theorists and researchers within other areas such as organizational communication. This is because it imparts a deeper understanding of the contextual, and relational, factors that shape, change and organize human behavior.

Traditionally, concepts employed to study technology use at the workplace were adopted from advancements in philosophy and sociology, such as contingency theory, structuration theory and actor-network theory. However, sociomateriality is the first concept to be developed within the field of Information System (IS) studies, a division of management and organization theory. It has been argued that sociomateriality is 'the new black' of IS. Barad explains that human actors and technological objects are understood to emerge in sociomaterial assemblages. Those assemblages are the results of agential cuts, which transform the boundary objects into temporally stabilized agencies.

== Approaches and methods in existing literature ==
Orlikowski has studied sociomateriality by using a company's BlackBerry-addicted employees and the effects of Google's PageRank algorithm on research practices as case studies. Through interviews and her research, she exemplifies how sociomaterial practices develop both in and outside of the workplace, and how such practices have become acceptable.

Orlikowski and Scott's detailed paper aimed to bridge the theoretical gap seen in organization studies and management research journals by reviewing critical works on technology in order to create two research streams, before proposing a third emerging research genre, sociomateriality. They confront the issues with the existing literature by focussing on the arguments of several scholars over a period of three decades for both research streams. The result is a thoughtful call to action for scholars to regard how understudied technologies are within organizational research, despite their omnipresent nature.

Leonardi discusses the misalignment and alignment of technology's material features and social interactions. His paper sheds light on understanding how technologies are implemented in the workplace—in organizations—without dismissing the human factor. Through use and interaction with technologies, there comes new organizational structure—or, at least, an added layer into preexisting structures or norms.

Contractor, Monge and Leonardi use sociomateriality combined with actor-network theory, and developed a typology that brings technology into the network study.

Existing literature already proves to be thought provoking in terms of understanding big issues, such as what is being compromised by sociomaterial practices, and how are values and assimilation procedures in organizations changing due to technological dependencies.

== Related literature and future directions ==
Even in organizational literature at-large, the ideas and issues of sociomateriality are inadvertently present—which, in itself, warrants the need for further investigations solely through a sociomaterial lens. For instance, Catherine Turco's book The Conversational Firm: Rethinking Bureaucracy in the Age of Social Media is about the transformation of a traditional firm into a more open, non-hierarchical, technology-driven, and social "conversational firm". The discussions presented in her book—from online communication software to office space—intrinsically relate back to sociomaterial practices in the workplace. Most of the firm's successes, and even some failures, all reside in the relationship between the employees, their environment and the technology they use to communicate. These material practices not only change the ways in which communication happens within the firm, but it also changes the way employees behave outside of the office. Turco's ethnographic account of this firm provokes inquiry around the same separation—between technology and the process of organizing within firms—that sociomateriality seeks to bridge.

Other scholars have worked on intersection between organization studies and other, related disciplines. Migration policies, and organizational settings have been analyzed from a sociomaterial perspective, and other researchers have illuminated how higher education and university settings are influenced by objects using a sociomaterial approach. Ethnographic studies of blockchain-based decentralized autonomous organizations (DAOs) have similarly traced the materialities of code, hardware, and human practice, framing these digital organizations as human–machine assemblages. Outside of organization studies, technology theorists, such as Sherry Turkle, have written books that perhaps do not directly tackle sociomateriality, but have it on their horizon. Turkle's two books focus on the affordances, constraints and negative impacts of the social media age on human interactions and dialogue. In his book, William Mitchell proposes, the "trial separation" of bits (the elementary unit of information) and atoms (the elementary unit of matter) is over. With increasing frequency, events in physical space reflect events in cyberspace, and vice versa, rendering a new urban condition—that of ubiquitous, inescapable network interconnectivity.

From such works, it is clear that an ethnographic approach to understanding sociomaterial practices is a way forward in the field, and one can presume many qualitative, empirical studies of this nature will be conducted over the years while organizations continue to evolve and change in light of new technologies. Without a clear research stream on sociomateriality, there will inevitably be a lack of 'understanding of how work is "made to work"'. Nonetheless, these authors are all adding to the new frontier in management and organization theories and research to understand the inextricable sociomaterial relationship between humans and technology.

Despite its popularity in various disciplines, the theorizing of sociomateriality has been critiqued due to its less specific definition of technology and a neglect of broader social structures. In addition, it is believed that the theoretical perspective can benefit from a less obscure vocabulary and more coherent jargon use. In responding to the criticism, Scott and Orlikowski maintain that sociomateriality is a novel and innovative perspective, and scholars should strive to sustain the openness and experimentation in the framing of the theory.
