= JoAnne Yates =

American business theorist

JoAnne Yates Sloan Distinguished Professor of Management, Emerita at the MIT Sloan School of Management, has worked at the intersection of organization studies and information technology. She has contributed to a number of fields including organizational theory, rhetoric and writing studies, genre theory, business history, archival studies, history of computing, and standardization.

She has been recognized as a thought leader in business communication. Her work has achieved awards in several fields, including the Alpha Kappa Psi Award for Distinguished Publication in Business Communication (three times); Outstanding Researcher in Business Communication, the Association for Business Communication; Waldo Gifford Leland Prize of the Society of American Archivists; the Harold F. Williamson, Sr. Prize for Mid-Career Achievement in Business History; Lifetime Service Award from the Organizational Communication and Information Systems Division of the Academy of Management; and numerous best paper awards.

== Biography ==
Yates received her BA from Texas Christian University in 1974, and her M.A. and later her Ph.D. in 1980 from the University of North Carolina.

In the 1980 she started her academic career at the Massachusetts Institute of Technology, Cambridge, MA, where she founded the Managerial Communication Unit. Since 1999 she has been Sloan Distinguished Professor of Management at the MIT Sloan School of Management. From 2007 to 2012 she was Deputy Dean of the Sloan School of Management. She retired in 2020.

Yates' research focuses on the use of communication and information technology in business. Her aim is to understand "how the use of communication and information technology within firms shapes and is shaped over time by its changing organizational, managerial, and technological contexts."

== Publications ==
Yates has authored and co-authored numerous publications including both monographs in business history and articles in management and communication journals.

Her award-winning book Control Through Communication (1989) examines the intersection of the rise of corporate organizations, changing communicative practices, and the emergence of material technologies that facilitate control through communication, from pigeon hole desks to filing systems; from handwritten copies to typewriters to duplication technologies; and from letters to memos, standardized reports, and summary business charts.

Her book Structuring the Information Age: Life Insurance and Information Technology in the 20th Century (2005) shows how the information-intensive life insurance industry pioneered record keeping and sorting technologies in the United States from the turn of the twentieth century, then how their pre-computing technologies and practices shaped the adoption and early use of early computer technology, while at the same time shaping the evolution of the computer industry itself.

Her most recent book, co-authored with her husband Craig N. Murphy, Engineering Rules: Global Standard Setting since 1880 (2019) studies the rise and important role of private, voluntary standard setting in the global economy.

Her collaborations with MIT colleague Wanda Orlikowski in the 1990s and after introduced rhetorical analysis of genre within a frame of structuration theory to organizational studies. They then used this approach to study the use of new electronic modes of communication within organizations.

=== Selected books ===
- 1993. Control Through Communication: The Rise of System in American Management. Johns Hopkins University Press
- 2001. IT and Organizational Transformation: History, Rhetoric, and Practice. With John Van Maanen eds., Sage Publications.
- 2005. Structuring the Information Age: Life Insurance and Information Technology in the 20th Century. Johns Hopkins University Press.
- 2009. Craig N. Murphy & JoAnne Yates. The International Organization for Standardization: Global Governance through Voluntary Consensus. London: Routledge.
- 2019. JoAnne Yates & Craig N. Murphy. Engineering Rules: Global Standard Setting Since 1880. Baltimore: Johns Hopkins University Press.

=== Selected articles ===
- 1985. Yates, J., Graphs as a managerial tool: a case study of Du Pont's use of graphs, 1904–1949. Journal of Business Communication 22, 5–33.
- 1985. Yates, J., Internal communication systems in American business structures: a framework to aid appraisal. The American Archivist 48, 141–158.
- 1987. Malone, Thomas W., Joanne Yates, and Robert I. Benjamin. "Electronic markets and electronic hierarchies." Communications of the ACM 30.6: 484–497.
- 1992. Yates, JoAnne, and Wanda J. Orlikowski. "Genres of organizational communication: A structurational approach to studying communication and media." Academy of management review 17, 2, 299–326.
- 1994. Orlikowski, Wanda J., and JoAnne Yates. Genre repertoire: The structuring of communicative practices in organizations. Administrative science quarterly 39, 541–574.
- 1995. Orlikowski, W. J., Yates, J., Okamura, K., & Fujimoto, M. "Shaping electronic communication: the metastructuring of technology in the context of use." Organization science 6.4, 423–444.
