= Male and Female He Created Them =

2019 document of the Congregation for Catholic Education

Male and Female He Created Them: Toward a Path of Dialogue on the Question of Gender Theory in Education is a document of the Congregation for Catholic Education, published on June 10, 2019, under the prefect Cardinal Giuseppe Versaldi, during the pontificate of Pope Francis, that instructs Catholic schools to teach their students on how to dialogue with others about gender identity.

== Summary ==
The document builds on the apostolic exhortation Amoris laetitia (On Love in the Family), where Pope Francis says, "No one can think that the weakening of the family as that natural society founded on marriage will prove beneficial to society as a whole." It rejects the idea that transgender people can be any gender besides that which is assigned, generally at birth, based on observed physical sex. Further it argues that allowing gender norms to change destabilizes the family and society, and that "gender theory" is contrary to the Catholic faith.

"Gender theory", according to the Congregation, "speaks of" a "denaturalisation, that is a move away from nature and towards an absolute option for the decision of [...] feelings".(italics in original). The document alleges that "such theories" can be "traced back to"

dualistic anthropology, separating body (reduced to the status of inert matter) from human will, which itself becomes an absolute that can manipulate the body as it pleases. [...]physicalism and voluntarism gives rise to relativism, in which everything that exists is of equal value and at the same time undifferentiated, without any real order or purpose. In all such theories,[...] one's gender ends up being viewed as more important than being of male or female sex. The effect of this move is chiefly to create a cultural and ideological revolution driven by relativism, and secondarily a juridical revolution, since such beliefs claim specific rights for the individual and across society. (italics in original)

The Congregation states that "gender theory" is "strictly sociological". The Congregation asserted a "distinction" between "the whole field of research on gender that the human sciences have undertaken" and "the ideology of gender".

The document further states that "the ideas of 'intersex' or 'transgender' [...] [are] self-contradictory", and are associated with "only 'provocative' display against so-called 'traditional frameworks' [sic]". (Note: "Efforts to go beyond the constitutive male-female sexual difference, such as the ideas of 'intersex' or 'transgender', lead to a masculinity or feminity that is ambiguous, even though (in a self-contradictory way), these concepts themselves actually presuppose the very sexual difference that they propose to negate or supersede. This oscillation between male and female becomes [...] only a 'provocative' display against so-called 'traditional frameworks', and one which, in fact, ignores the suffering of those who have to live situations of sexual indeterminacy. Similar theories aim to annihilate the concept of 'nature', (that is, everything we have been given as a pre-existing foundation of our being and action in the world), while at the same time implicitly reaffirming its existence.")

The Congregation states that "only [...] reproductive technology", which is not a "replacement" of "natural conception" (Note: "'in vitro' [sic] fertilization and a surrogate mother [...] [are] [...] not a replacement for natural conception, since it involves the manipulation of human embryos, the fragmentation of parenthood, the instrumentalization [sic] and/or commercialization of the human body as well as the reduction of a baby to an object in the hands of science and technology") can "allow one of the partners in a relationship of two persons of the same sex to generate offspring", and cannot "assure[...] the necessary conditions" for reproduction.

== Responses ==
United States Conference of Catholic Bishops stated that the document "will serve as a solid framework for those engaged in the ministry of Catholic education". Cindy Bourgeois, minister of Wesley United Church in Regina, Saskatchewan, wrote on CBC News that the document "summarily dismisses entire academic fields and misrepresents science to fit its desired outcome." Daniel Horan OFM stated that "the document at once claims a good-faith interest in conversation, while portending a dismissive monologue instead."

== See also ==
- Anti-gender movement § Terminology
- Christianity and transgender people § Documents and declarations
- Gender studies
- Sex and gender roles in the Catholic Church
- Pope Francis and LGBT topics § "Gender theory" and "gender ideology"
- Social construction of gender § Gender
- Human sciences
- Nashville Statement
