= Judith Miller (philosopher) =

French psychoanalyst (1941–2017)

Judith Miller

Judith Miller (French: [milɛʁ]; 3 July 1941 – 6 December 2017) was a French philosopher and psychoanalyst.

== Life ==
Born Judith Bataille in Antibes, she was the daughter of psychoanalyst Jacques Lacan and Sylvia Bataille, then still married to, though separated from, Georges Bataille. Judith married the Lacanian analyst Jacques-Alain Miller in November 1966.

In 1968, Michel Foucault recruited her, along with Alain Badiou, Jacques Rancière, Etienne Balibar and others, to teach philosophy at the newly-founded University of Paris VIII. The same year, Miller and her husband joined the Maoist Gauche Prolétarienne. Miller earnt notoriety by handing out course credit to strangers on a bus, describing the university as "a figment of capitalist society", and threatening, in a March 1970 interview with L'Express, to do everything she could to make it run as badly as possible. Miller was barred from university teaching, though permitted to teach in a lycée; and certification was removed from the entire philosophy department.

Judith Miller died on 6 December 2017 in Paris, aged 76.

== Work ==
With her husband, Miller edited the series "Champ freudien" published by Éditions du Seuil. The series had been founded by her father.

== Publications ==
=== Book ===
- Album Jacques Lacan: Visages de mon père. Paris: Seuil, 1990.

=== Articles ===
- "Métaphysique de la physique de Galilée", Cahiers pour l’Analyse, 9.9 (1968).
- Interview with Pierre Klossowski in Hervé Castanet, Pierre Klossowski, la pantomime des esprits (Nantes: C. Defaut, 2007).
- "Lacan, Music" (with Diego Masson), Lacanian Ink, no. 39 (Spring 2012).

=== As editor ===
- Le Champ freudien à travers le monde: Textes recueillis, Paris: Seuil, 1986.
- L'Avenir de l'autisme avec Rosine et Robert Lefort. Paris: Navarin, 2010.

== Sources ==
- Psychologues freudiens Entretien avec Judith Miller sur le "Champ freudien".
