= Cahiers pour l'Analyse =

French magazine

- Founded: 1966
- Final issue: 1969

Cahiers pour l'Analyse was a magazine published in Paris in the 1960s. Ten issues appeared between 1966 and 1969. It was "guided by the examples of Georges Canguilhem, Jacques Lacan and Louis Althusser".

Edited by a small group of Althusser's students at the Ecole Normale Supérieure, the magazine appeared during what were – arguably – the most fertile and productive years in French philosophy during the whole of the twentieth century.

== Contributors ==
- Louis Althusser
- Gaston Bachelard
- Alain Badiou
- Jacques Bouveresse
- Georges Canguilhem
- Jacques Derrida
- Georges Dumézil
- Michel Foucault
- Kurt Gödel
- André Green
- Martial Gueroult
- Thomas Herbert a.k.a. Michel Pêcheux
- Luce Irigaray
- Jacques Lacan
- Serge Leclaire
- Claude Lévi-Strauss
- Jacques-Alain Miller
- Judith Miller
- Jean-Claude Milner
- François Regnault
- Bertrand Russell
- Daniel Paul Schreber
