= Alfa Romeo 500A =

Overview
- Production: 1945-1948

Body and chassis
- Related: Alfa Romeo 500

The Alfa Romeo 500A was a bus produced by Alfa Romeo from 1945 to 1948.

== History ==
The bus had an advanced form for the 1940s and was used for tourist trips in Italy. The bus body was from Orlandi and had a 130 HP engine. It had seats for 26 passengers.

== Starring ==
The bus starred in the 1961 Italian movie Il federale.

== Production ==
About 40 units were produced.

== See also ==
- List of buses
