= Jacques-Alain Miller =

French psychoanalyst (born 1944)

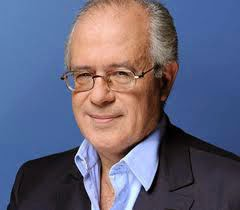
- Born: 14 February 1944 (age 82); Châteauroux, France
- Occupation: Psychoanalyst
- Relatives: See list: Gérard Miller (brother); Jacques Lacan (father-in-law); Laurence Bataille (sister-in-law)

Academic background
- Education: École Normale Superieure
- Academic advisors: Louis Althusser; Roland Barthes

Academic work
- Institutions: University of Paris VIII
- Doctoral students: Slavoj Žižek

Jacques-Alain Miller (French: [milɛʁ]; born 14 February 1944) is a French psychoanalyst and psychoanalytic theorist. A former student of Jacques Lacan as well as his son-in-law, Miller is one of the founding members of the École de la Cause freudienne (School of the Freudian Cause) and the World Association of Psychoanalysis, the latter of which he presided over from 1992 to 2002. He is the sole editor of the books in The Seminar of Jacques Lacan series.

== Life and career ==
=== 1960s ===
In 1962, Miller entered the École Normale Supérieure (ENS), where he studied with Louis Althusser. His fellow students included Étienne Balibar, Pierre Macherey, François Regnault, Robert Linhart, and Jean-Claude Milner. At the ENS he attended the seminars of Roland Barthes, the "first writer with whom I had a close friendship". At this time he also met the young Jacques Derrida, who was lecturing at the Sorbonne.

In 1963, Althusser assigned Miller the task of reading "all of Lacan". The following year, Jacques Lacan was appointed lecturer at the École Pratique des Hautes Études and transferred his Seminar to the ENS. Over the summer break of 1964, Lacan invited Miller to his country house, La Prévôté in Guitrancourt, where Miller read the transcriptions of Lacan's early seminars. During a later stay at Guitrancourt, Miller began a relationship with Judith Lacan, Lacan's daughter, whom he married in 1966. In the same year, Miller composed the index of concepts and the commentary on the graphs in Lacan's landmark book Écrits and founded Cahiers pour l'Analyse, a seminal publication whose editorial board included Alain Grosrichard, Regnault, Milner, and, later, Alain Badiou.

Miller's written texts from this early period are published in the Gallimard collection Un début dans la vie (2002), which includes his interview with Jean-Paul Sartre and an influential essay he presented at Lacan's Seminar of 24 February 1965, "Suture: Elements of the Logic of the Signifier".

=== 1970s ===
After a period of involvement in the left-wing movements associated with the May 1968 protest movement in France, Miller was encouraged by Lacan to take "another path by which to get your privileged revolt across: mine for example". In time Miller would become instrumental in Lacan's École Freudienne de Paris, founding and editing the journal Ornicar ? which published lessons of Lacan's Seminar. When Lacan moved to the University of Vincennes—the Department of Psychoanalysis was renamed "Le Champ freudien"—Lacan became its director, and Michel Foucault appointed Jacques-Alain Miller president.

Miller's teaching from this period (1972-1978) took on the name L'Orientation lacanienne and gave rise to published texts on Bentham, Peirce and Church.

In 1973, Miller transcribed Lacan's the 1964 Seminar on The Four Fundamental Concepts of Psychoanalysis which was to lead to a lifelong commitment to establishing the full series of Lacan's annual Parisian Seminar. Book XI was published by Seuil in 1973, with Books I & Book XX following in 1975 and Book II in 1978.

Miller also contributed in 1973 to the two-part televised programme that later became known as "Television".

=== 1980s ===
Lacan's dissolution of the EFP in 1980 was followed by the creation of La cause freudienne. Soon thereafter Lacan died, leaving Miller as the sole editor of his seminars.

Miller resumed his weekly seminars in 1980, thus opening the series known as L'Orientation lacanienne II. Dedicated to expounding and elucidating Lacan's work, Miller's course was attended by many influential figures in psychoanalytic theory, notably Éric Laurent and Slavoj Zizek. The Lacanian Orientation course went under the banner of a "return to the clinic" and early themes included "From the Symptom to the Fantasy" (1982-3), "The Differential Clinic of Psychoses" (1987-8 DEA seminar), and "Traits of Perversion" (1988-9).

The 1980s were also a period of travel in Europe and Latin America to consolidate the emerging communities of Lacan's students and adherents, culminating in the founding of the European School of Psychoanalysis in 1990 (now the European Federation of the Schools of the WAP) and the Argentine Escuela de la Orientación Lacaniana in 1992.

Over this decade, Miller established Book III and Book VII of Lacan's Seminar. Miller's 1980s lectures in Buenos Aires are collected in Tome I of Conferencias Porteñas (Paidos, 2010).

=== 1990s ===
In the early nineties, Miller's work began to be translated into English and published in the United States through the Newsletter of the Freudian Field and the New York-based cultural journal Lacanian Ink under the editorship of Josefina Ayerza.

In 1992, Miller launched the World Association of Psychoanalysis which grouped together the École de la Cause freudienne, the European School of Psychoanalysis, and the Escuela de la Orientación Lacaniana, and soon thereafter oversaw the creation of Schools in Brazil, Spain and Italy which were likewise included in the WAP.

The end of the decade saw a "thaw" in relations with the IPA thanks to the efforts of its then President Horacio Etchegoyen. Miller was invited to attend the 1997 IPA Congress in Barcelona where his remarks from the floor were greeted with warm applause.

In 1995, Miller's weekly course moved to the Paul-Painlevé Amphitheatre at the Conservatoire National des Arts et Métiers, where it would continue until his retirement from University Paris-VIII in 2009. In 1998, his teaching entered its third phase as L'Orientation lacanienne III. The Buenos Aires lectures of the 1989-1996 period are collected in Tome II of Conferencias Porteñas (Paidos, 2009). The nineteen nineties also saw the publication of Book IV, Book V and Book XVII of Lacan's Seminar, established by Miller.

=== 2000s ===
After two decades devoted exclusively to training analysts and furthering worldwide institutional links, alongside the ongoing transcription of Lacan’s Seminar, 2001 saw a return to the public stage Miller had occupied in the late sixties. In June 2001, the journal of the SPP published an article that on Miller and the École de la Cause freudienne to which Miller objected. He stated his case, publishing a first letter on 3 September 2001. Its enthusiastic reception by France’s intellectual community gave rise to five further letters which look in detail at the issues surrounding Lacan’s 1963 "excommunication" from the IPA and the history of the psychoanalytic movement over the four ensuing decades. The third letter, penned in the wake of the September 11 attacks, also offers a reflection on terrorism and political action.

In 2003, Miller founded the New Lacanian School, which groups together the societies from the UK, Belgium, Switzerland, Israel, and Greece along with affiliated groups from Ireland and Eastern Europe. In the same year he published the satirical Neveu de Lacan (Verdier) in response to the 2002 pamphlet by Daniel Lindenberg, Le Rappel à l’ordre.

In October 2003, the French government passed a bill intended to regulate, for the first time, the practice of psychotherapy in France. Miller raised issues with this in another letter, published on 17 November, addressed to the UMP politician Bernard Accoyer. Over the following months, Miller spearheaded the movement dedicated to increasing both public and professional awareness of the issues at stake, prompting Bernard-Henri Lévy to write: "Sometimes history hangs on a thread. It is quite likely that in this affair the thread bears the name of this one man: Jacques-Alain Miller".

The transcription of Lacan’s Seminar continued, with Book VIII (Second Edition), Book X, Book XXIII, Book XVI and Book XVIII all appearing in this decade. In 2008, at the time of the sixth WAP Congress, Miller delivered a lecture before a 1,700 strong audience at the Teatro Coliseo. This lecture is transcribed alongside his 1996-2001 Argentine lectures collected in Tome III of Conferencias Porteñas (Paidos, 2010). At this time, he also became a regular guest-contributor to France Culture radio and French news magazines such as Marianne and Le Point. A selection of his public articles was collected as Le secret des dieux (2005) and in 2008, he took part in the “Rally of the Impossible Professions” in London, speaking alongside Richard Gombrich and Michael Power. In 2009, he founded Hurly-Burly, the International Lacanian Journal of Psychoanalysis.

=== 2010–present ===
Miller's 2009-2010 course, delivered at the Théâtre Déjazet, was dedicated to Lacan's life, examining links between Lacan's psychoanalytic ethics and biographical details that Miller had not previously related in public. The course was later partially written up and published as Vie de Lacan (2011).

Miller's ongoing psychoanalytic teaching is regularly translated into English, as are his frequent articles and interviews on current events.

Book XIX of the Seminar of Jacques Lacan appeared in 2011 and Book VI in 2013.

== Selected works ==
- Culture/Clinic 1: Applied Lacanian Psychoanalysis, University of Minnesota Press, Saint Paul, 2013, ISBN 0816683190.
- First Letter Addressed by Jacques-Alain Miller To an Enlightened Public, New York: The Wooster Press, 2002. ISBN 1888301996.
- Clear Like Day Letter for the twenty years since the death of Jacques Lacan written by Jacques-Alain Miller To an Enlightened Public, New York: The Wooster Press, 2001. ISBN 1888301988.
- The Tenderness of Terrorists and Other Letters written by Jacques-Alain Miller To an Enlightened Public, New York: The Wooster Press, 2002. ISBN 188830197X.
- "Introduction to Reading Jacques Lacan's Seminar on Anxiety I ", New York: Lacanian Ink 26, Fall 2005.
- "Introduction to Reading Jacques Lacan's Seminar on Anxiety II", New York: Lacanian Ink 27, Spring 2006.
- "Jacques Lacan's Later Teachings", New York: Spring Lacanian Ink 21, 2003.
- "The Paradigms of Jouissance" New York, Lacanian Ink 17, Fall 2000.
- "Suture: Elements of the Logic of the Signifier", Lacan Dot Com, The Symptom 2006.
- "Religion, Psychoanalysis", Lacanian Ink 23, Spring 2004.
- "Pure Psychoanalysis, Applied Psychoanalysis and Psychotherapy", Lacanian Ink 20, Spring 2002.
- The pathology of democracy: a letter to Bernard Accoyer and to enlightened opinion (2005), Karnac Books.
- Five Lessons on Language and the Real (1997) in Hurly-Burly, Issue 7, May 2012, pp. 59–118.
