= Michel Pêcheux =

French linguist and philosopher

Michel Pêcheux (French: [peʃø]; 24 June 1938 – 10 December 1983) was a French linguist and philosopher. He is best known for his theoretical, experimental and practical contributions to the field of discourse analysis, starting in the late 1960s.

== Life and career ==
Born in Tours in 1938, Pêcheux studied philosophy at École normale supérieure (ENS) between 1959 and 1963, under the tutelage of Louis Althusser and Georges Canguilhem. In 1966, he started his research career in the department of social psychology of the Centre National de la Recherche Scientifique. While at ENS, Pêcheux became involved with the journal Cahiers pour l'Analyse, where he began developing a Marxist approach to discourse analysis. In all of his contributions to the Cahiers, Pêcheux used the pseudonym "Thomas Herbert".

Pêcheux committed suicide on 10 December 1983 in Champigny-sur-Marne, at the age of 45. At the time of his death, he was serving as a professor at the University of Paris 7.

== Contributions to discourse analysis ==
Pêcheux is the founder of French discourse analysis in which he combined concepts from historical materialism, linguistics and psychoanalysis, inspired by Louis Althusser, Ferdinand de Saussure and Jacques Lacan. Between the 1960s and 1970s, Pêcheux worked with a group of researchers to theorize what he called "materiality" of discourse, giving continuity to the theoretical work of Althusser in the field of linguistics, but also, at the same time, challenging the proposal for discourse analysis of Zelig Harris. In his proposal for discourse analysis, Pêcheux conceptualized discourse as a "materiality (at once, historical and linguistic) that is informed by ideology.

Pêcheux's work on discourse analysis had impact outside France after the 1980s, becoming an influential approach to language studies in Brazil, where his writings were translated into Portuguese by Eni Orlandi, a linguist from Brazil who continued his work and advanced discourse analysis in the country. The subject is part of the study of linguistics in various research institutions in Brazil, such as UNICAMP, UFRGS, and Fluminense Federal University.

== Selected bibliography ==
=== In French ===
- Analyse automatique du discours. Paris, Dunod (1969)
- Les vérités de la Palice. Paris, Maspero (1975)
- La langue introuvable. Paris, Maspero (1981) with Françoise Gadet

=== Translated to English ===
- "Discourse: Structure or Event?", trans. Warren Montag, with Marie-Germaine Pêcheux and Denise Guback. In Marxism and the Interpretation of Culture, eds. Cary Nelson and Lawrence Grossberg. Urbana and Chicago: University of Illinois Press, 1988, pp. 633–650.
- "Ideology: Fortress or Paradoxical Space?". In Rethinking Ideology: A Marxist Debate, eds. Sakari Hänninen and Leena Paldan. New York: International General/IMMRC, 1983.
