= Jean-Claude Milner =

French philosopher (born 1941)

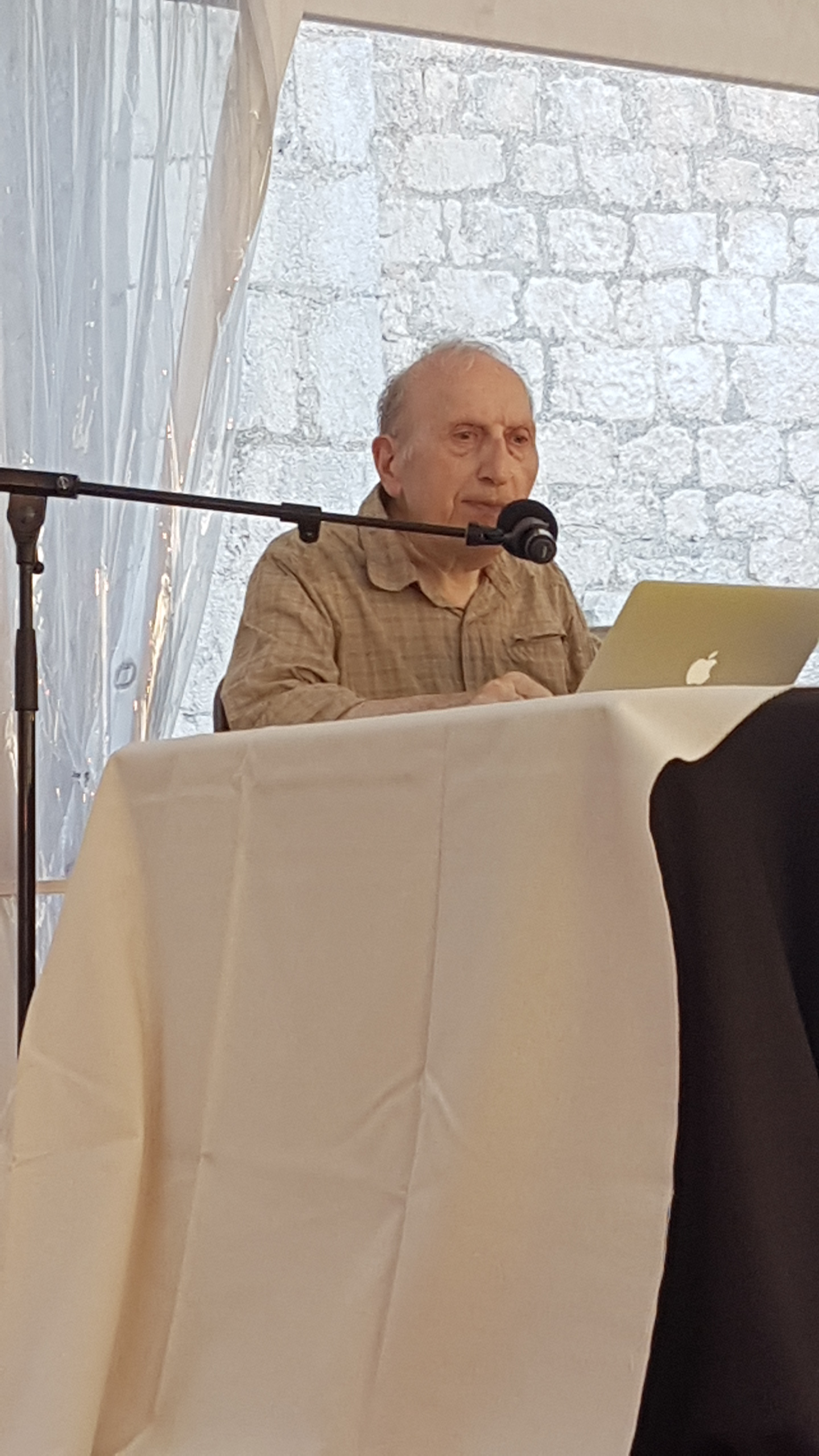
Jean-Claude Milner in 2019

Jean-Claude Milner (French: [milnɛʁ]; born 3 January 1941) is a French linguist, philosopher and essayist. His specialist fields of endeavour are linguistics (which he studied with Roland Barthes) and psychoanalysis (through the teaching and friendship of Jacques Lacan). In 1971, Milner was at the Massachusetts Institute of Technology where he translated Noam Chomsky's Aspects of the Theory of Syntax into French. His work helped to establish the terminology of theory of syntax in the French school of generative grammar. Milner is now a professor at the University Paris Diderot and lives in Paris.

== Life and work ==
Milner, who was born in Paris, is the son of a Lithuanian immigrant Jewish father and an Alsatian mother of the Protestant faith.

After studies in a second year preparatory class for the humanities during high school, Milner studied at both École Normale Supérieure and at the Massachusetts Institute of Technology. His education was shaped by the thought and teaching of Louis Althusser and Jacques Lacan. Lacan's influence may also be tied to his friendship with Jacques-Alain Miller during these early years. Miller became, subsequently, the son-in-law of Lacan. Both Miller and Milner attended Lacan's seminars held at the ENS and their friendship was instrumental in the founding and direction of the Cahiers pour l'Analyse several years later.

From 1968 to 1971, Milner was affiliated with the Maoist group Gauche prolétarienne. Milner disavowed or moved away from these early affiliations. Alain Badiou, who has remained steadfast in his Maoist affiliations, engaged in a long-standing contretemps with Milner over these changing affiliations (and many other differences, including accusing Badiou of antisemitism).

Milner also received training and education from Roland Barthes and made a close reading of Roman Jakobson.

After his initial association with Chomsky's linguistic theories, Milner's work took a different turn. He published Introduction to a Science of Language (1989) which melds a general linguistics theory, that rests on a radical separation between sense and syntax (theory of syntactic positions) together with an epistemology that combines concepts of Karl Popper and Imre Lakatos. This work tackles a key epistemological problem of the scientific status of Lacan's theories. Milner also follows developments of Chomskyian theory though he does not adhere to the hypothesis of a biological justification for it which Chomsky defended.

Milner's later work, such as the English publication of For the Love of Language, has been called,

"a path-breaking reflection on the consequences of Lacan's theory for the study of language".

Since 2000, particularly in France, Milner has been recognised for his essays concerning anti-Semitism in European history and culture. For several years, he has held a seminar devoted to this theme at the Institut d'études levinassiennes in Paris.

In 2010, Milner became Professor Emeritus of Linguistics at the Université de Paris VII.

In 2017, he became the first recipient to be honored by the joint prize presented by Les Rencontres Philosophiques de Monaco and the Prince Pierre Foundation for his entire body of work and lifetime of achievement. This award is given annually.

== Selected publications ==
=== English ===
- For The Love of Language, translated and introduced by Ann Banfield. Basingstoke: Palgrave-Macmillan, 1990. ISBN 0-312-03554-3
- "The Doctrine of Science", translated by Oliver Feltham. Umbr(a): A Journal of the Unconscious, Science, and Truth. (2000), pp. 33–63. This is the second chapter of Milner's L’Œuvre claire : Lacan, la science, et la philosophie.
- Slavoj Žižek (Ed.). Jacques Lacan: Critical Evaluations in Cultural Theory (4 Volumes). Volume One contains "The Doctrine of Science" (see above). Volume Two contains "Extracts from For The Love of Language", which is Chapters 5, 6, & 7 of For The Love of Language, pp. 98–127.
- "The Prince and the Revolutionary", Crisis and Critique, volume 3, issue 1 (2016), pp. 71–78
- "The Tell-Tale Constellations", translated by Christian R. Gelder. S: Journal for the Circle of Lacanian Ideology Critique. (2016), pp. 31-38.

=== Translations into French ===
- Noam Chomsky : Aspects de la theorie syntaxique, Paris: Éditions Le Seuil, 1971.

== Books ==
- Arguments linguistiques, Mame, 1973
- De la syntaxe à l’interprétation. Quantités, insultes, exclamations, Le Seuil, collection « Travaux linguistiques », 1978
- L’Amour de la langue, Le Seuil, collection « Connexions du Champ freudien », 1978
- Ordres et raisons de langue, Le Seuil, 1982
- Les Noms indistincts, Le Seuil, collection « Connexions du Champ freudien », 1983
- De l’école, le Seuil, 1984
- De l'inutilité des arbres en linguistique, Département de Recherches Linguistiques, Un. de Paris VII, coll. ERA 642, 1985
- Détections fictives, Le Seuil, collection « Fictions & Cie », 1985
- Introduction à un traitement du passif, Département de Recherches Linguistiques, Un. de Paris VII, coll. ERA 642, 1986 (rééd.)
- Dire le vers, (en collaboration avec François Regnault), Le Seuil, 1987
- Introduction à une science du langage, Le Seuil, collection « Travaux linguistiques », 1989
- Constat, 1992
- Archéologie d’un échec : 1950-1993, Le Seuil, 1993
- L’Œuvre claire : Lacan, la science et la philosophie, Éditions Le Seuil, collection « L’Ordre philosophique », 1995
- « Les Dénis », dans Paroles à la bouche du présent. Le négationnisme, histoire ou politique ?, sous la direction de Natacha Michel, Éd. Al Dante, 1997
- Le Salaire de l’idéal, Éditions Le Seuil, 1997
- Le Triple du plaisir, Verdier, 1997
- Mallarmé au tombeau, Verdier, 1999
- Les penchants criminels de l'Europe démocratique, Verdier, 2003
- Existe-t-il une vie intellectuelle en France ?, Éditions Verdier, 2002
- Le Périple structural, Figures et paradigmes, Éditions Le Seuil, collection « La couleur des idées », 2002
- Constats, Gallimard, coll. Folio/Essais. (rassemble Constat, Le triple du plaisir, Mallarmé au tombeau)
- Le Pas philosophique de Roland Barthes, Verdier, 2003
- La politique des choses, Navarin éditeur, 2005
- Le Juif de savoir, Grasset, 2007
- L'arrogance du présent. Regards sur une décennie, 1965-1975, Éditions Grasset, 2009
