= Nina Lykke (gender studies scholar) =

Danish–Swedish gender studies scholar (born 1949)

- Born: 1949 (age 76–77); Copenhagen, Denmark

Academic background
- Education: Odense University, Denmark

Academic work
- Main interests: Gender studies

Nina Lykke (born 1949) is a Danish–Swedish gender studies scholar. She is noted for her work on feminist theory, and is distinguished professor of gender studies at Linköping University in Sweden.

== Biography ==
Nina Lykke was born in Copenhagen, Denmark. She received a mag.art. (PhD) degree in literature at the University of Copenhagen in 1981 and a dr.phil. (higher doctoral degree) in gender studies at Odense University, Denmark in 1992. From 1984 until 1999 she was director of the Centre for Women's and Gender Studies, the first of its kind in Denmark, at the University of Southern Denmark. She was an assistant professor from 1981 and was promoted to associate professor in 1986. In 1999 she was appointed as a professor of gender studies at Linköping University, where she is head of Tema Gender. She was granted the title of distinguished professor by the university in 2008.

Nina Lykke’s research focuses on feminist theory, including intersectionality studies, feminist cultural studies and feminist technoscience studies.

She is director of the international Centre of Gender Excellence, GEXcel, of the Nordic Research School in Interdisciplinary Gender Studies and of the PhD Programme in Interdisciplinary Gender Studies at Linköping University.

She is associate editor of the European Journal of Women's Studies and advisor for several other scholarly feminist journals.

== Honours ==
She received an honorary doctorate at Karlstad University in 2016.

== Selected bibliography ==
- Lykke, Nina; Braidotti, Rosi (1996). Between monsters, goddesses, and cyborgs: feminist confrontations with science, medicine, and cyberspace. London Atlantic Highlands, New Jersey, USA: Zed Books. ISBN 9781856493826.
- Lykke, Nina; Smelik, Anneke (2008). Bits of life: feminism at the intersections of media, bioscience, and technology. Seattle: University of Washington Press. ISBN 9780295988092.
- Lykke, Nina (2010). Feminist studies: a guide to intersectional theory, methodology and writing. New York, New York: Routledge. ISBN 9780203852774.
- Lykke, Nina; Buikema, Rosemarie; Griffin, Gabriele (2011). Theories and methodologies in postgraduate feminist research: researching differently. New York, New York: Routledge. ISBN 9780203817339.
- Lykke, Nina (2014). Writing academic texts differently: intersectional feminist methodologies and the playful art of writing. New York/London: Routledge. ISBN 9780415502252.
