= Eni Orlandi =

Brazilian linguist

Eni de Lourdes Puccinelli Orlandi is a Brazilian researcher with great influence in French Discourse Analysis, being the one to bring it to Brazil by translating to Portuguese Michel Pêcheux's books and articles.

She is a researcher at Laboratório de Estudos Urbanos - Unicamp (Laboratory of Urban Studies of the University of Campinas), professor and coordinator of the Science Program of the Universidade do Vale da Linguagem do Sapucaí and professor of the University of Campinas. She is also a researcher 1A at Conselho Nacional de Desenvolvimento Científico e Tecnológico (CNPq).

== Professional and academic activity ==
A graduated in Arts and Literature from Faculty of Philosophy, Sciences and Letters of Araraquara (1964), she has a master's degree in Linguistics from the University of São Paulo (USP) (1970) and a PhD in Linguistics from USP and University of Paris / Vincennes (1976). She was a professor at USP from 1967 to 1979. From 1971 to 1974 she taught the discipline of discourse analysis in the specialization course in translation at Pontifical Catholic University of Campinas. She worked as a lecturer at the IEL Linguistics Department at Unicamp from 1979 to 2002.

== Publications ==
- 2012. Discurso em Análise: Sujeito, Sentido, Ideologia. Campinas: editora Pontes.
- 2011. Discurso, Espaço, Memória - Caminhos da identidade no sul de Minas. Campinas: editora RG. (org.)
- 2011. La construction du Brésil - á propos des discours français sur la découverte. Paris: L´Harmattan.
- 2011. Análise de Discurso Michel Pêcheux textos escolhidos. Campinas: Pontes. (org.)
- 2010. Discurso e Políticas Públicas Urbanas - A Fabricação do Consenso. Campinas: Editora RG.
- 2010 Gestos de Leitura. Campinas: Editora Unicamp (org.)
- 2009. O que é lingüística? (1a.edição: 1986, Ed. Brasiliense). 15. ed. São Paulo: Brasiliense.
- 2009. Língua Brasileira e outras Histórias - Discurso sobre a língua e ensino no Brasil. Campinas-SP: Editora RG, 2009.
- 2008. Discurso e texto: formação e circulação dos sentidos. 2 ed. Campinas: Pontes, 2008.
- 2008. Terra à vista (1a. edição: 1990, Ed. Cortez/Ed. da Unicamp). 2. ed. São Paulo/Campinas: Cortez/Unicamp.
- 2007. As Formas do Silêncio (1a. edição: 1992, Ed. da Unicamp; Prêmio Jabuti 1993). 6. ed. Campinas-SP: Editora da Unicamp.
- 2007. Análise de discurso: princípios e procedimentos (1a. edição: 1990, Ed. Pontes). 2. ed. Campinas: Pontes.
- 2007. Interpretação: autoria, leitura e efeitos do trabalho simbólico (1a. edição: 1996, Ed. Vozes). 2. ed. Campinas: Pontes.
- 2007. Política lingüística no Brasil. Campinas - SP: Pontes Editores, 2007.
- 2007. Un dialogue atlantique: production des sciences du langage au Brésil. Lyon: ENS Éditions, 2007.
- 2006. A linguagem e seu funcionamento - As formas do discurso (1a. edição: 1983, Ed. Brasiliense). 4. ed. São Paulo: Pontes Editores.
- 2006. Discurso e textualidade (com Suzy Lagazzi). Campinas-SP: Pontes Editores.
