= Karen Barad =

American feminist philosopher, theorist and physicist

- Born: Karen Michelle Barad; April 29, 1956 (age 70)

Education
- Education: Stony Brook University
- Thesis: Fermions in Lattice Gauge Theories (1984)

Philosophical work
- Era: Contemporary philosophy
- Region: Western philosophy
- School: Continental philosophy Materialism; Feminism
- Institutions: University of California, Santa Cruz
- Main interests: Theoretical physics, feminist theory
- Notable ideas: Agential realism Intra-action

Karen Michelle Barad (/bəˈrɑːd/; born 29 April 1956) is an American feminist theorist and theoretical physicist, known particularly for their theory of agential realism.

== Biography ==
They are currently Distinguished Professor of History of Consciousness and Affiliated Faculty in Philosophy at the University of California, Santa Cruz. They are the author of Meeting the Universe Halfway: Quantum Physics and the Entanglement of Matter and Meaning. Their research topics include feminist theory, physics, twentieth-century continental philosophy, epistemology, ontology, philosophy of physics, cultural studies of science, and feminist science studies.

Barad earned their doctorate in theoretical physics at Stony Brook University. Their dissertation presented computational methods for quantifying properties of quarks and other fermions within lattice gauge theory.

Barad serves on the advisory board for the feminist academic journals Catalyst: Feminism, Theory, Technoscience and Signs: Journal of Women in Culture and Society.

== Agential realism ==
According to Barad's theory of agential realism, the universe comprises phenomena, which are "the ontological inseparability of intra-acting agencies". Intra-action, a neologism introduced by Barad, signals an important challenge to individualist metaphysics. For Barad, phenomena or objects do not precede their interaction, rather, "objects" emerge through particular intra-actions. Thus, apparatuses, which produce phenomena, are not assemblages of humans and nonhumans (as in actor-network theory). Rather, they are the condition of possibility of "humans" and "non-humans", not merely as ideational concepts, but in their materiality. Apparatuses are "material-discursive" in that they produce determinate meanings and material beings while simultaneously excluding the production of others. What it means to matter is therefore always material-discursive. Barad takes their inspiration from physicist Niels Bohr, one of the founders of quantum physics. Barad's agential realism is at once an epistemology (theory of knowing), an ontology (theory of being), and an ethics. For this, Barad introduces the neologism "ontoepistemology". Because specific practices of mattering have ethical consequences, excluding other kinds of mattering, onto-epistemological practices are always in turn ethico-onto-epistemological.

Much of Barad's scholarly work has revolved around their concept of "agential realism," and their theories hold importance for many academic fields, including science studies, STS (Science, Technology, and Society), feminist technoscience, philosophy of science, feminist theory, and, of course, physics. In addition to Bohr, their work draws on the works of thinkers such as Michel Foucault, Judith Butler, Jacques Derrida, and Walter Benjamin, among others.

Barad's original training was in theoretical particle physics and quantum field theory. Their book, Meeting the Universe Halfway, (2007), includes a chapter that contains an original discovery in theoretical physics, which is largely unheard of in books that are usually categorized as "gender studies" or "cultural theory" books. In this book, Barad also argues that "agential realism," is useful to the analysis of literature, social inequalities, and many other things. This claim is based on the fact that Barad's agential realism is a way of understanding the politics, ethics, and agencies of any act of observation, and indeed any kind of knowledge practice. According to Barad, the deeply connected way that each "thing" is entangled with everything else in materially specific ways means that all intra-actions reconfigure the entanglements. Barad's innovative and far-reaching formulation of intra-action, which challenges the usual notion of interaction which assumes a metaphysics of individualism, offers a new formulation of causality. There are not things that interact, but rather through and within intra-actions there is a differentiating-entangling so that an agential cut is enacted that cuts things together-apart (one move) such that differences exist not as absolute separations but in their inseparability (i.e., "agential separability" as Barad calls it). Nothing is inherently separate from anything else, but separations are enacted within phenomena. This view of knowledge provides a framework for thinking about how culture and habits of thought can make some things visible and other things easier to ignore or to never see. For this reason, according to Barad, agential realism is useful for feminist analysis and other forms of political and social thought, even if the connection to science is not apparent.

Barad's framework makes several other arguments, and some of them are part of larger trends in fields such as science studies and feminist technoscience (all can be found in their 2007 book, Meeting the Universe Halfway):

- They define agency as a relationship and not as something that one "has".
- The scientist and the social are always part of the apparatus, and one needs to take account of this in its inseparability in analyzing the system. This differs from the view that political critiques of science seek to undermine the credibility of science; instead, Barad argues that this kind of critique actually makes for better, more credible science.
- They argue that politics and ethical issues are always part of scientific work, and only are made to seem separate by specific historical circumstances that encourage people to fail to see those connections. One example they discuss is the ethics of developing nuclear weapons to argue this point, by claiming that the ethics and politics are part of how such weapons were developed and understood, and therefore part of science, and not merely of the "philosophy of science" or the "ethics of science." This differs from the usual view that one can strive for a politics-free, bias-less science.
- Nevertheless, they argue against epistemological relativism, and offer an important alternative to the usual conception of objectivity.
- They also reject the idea that science is "only" a language game or set of fictions produced only by human constructions and concepts. Although the scientist is part of the "intra-action" of the experiment, humans (and their cultural constructs) do not have complete control over everything that happens. Barad expresses this point by saying, in "Getting Real," that although scientists shape knowledge about the universe, you can't ignore the way the universe "kicks back."

These points on science, agency, ethics, and knowledge reveal that Barad's work is similar to the projects of other science studies scholars such as Bruno Latour, Donna Haraway, Andrew Pickering, and Evelyn Fox Keller.

== Selected bibliography ==
=== Books ===
- Barad, Karen (2007). Meeting the Universe Halfway: Quantum Physics and the Entanglement of Matter and Meaning. Durham, North Carolina: Duke University Press. ISBN 978-0-8223-3917-5.
- —— (2012). Agentieller Realismus: Über die Bedeutung materiell-diskursiver Praktiken [Agential Realism: On the Importance of Material-Discursive Practices] (in German). Vol. 45. Berlin: Suhrkamp. ISBN 978-3-518-26045-6.
- —— (2015). Verschränkungen [Entanglements] (in German). Translated by Theodor, Jennifer Sophia. Berlin: Merve. p. 224. ISBN 978-3-88396-353-2.

=== Chapters in books ===
- —— (1997), "Meeting the universe halfway: realism and social constructivism without contradiction", in Nelson, Lynn Hankinson; Nelson, Jack (eds.), Feminism, science, and the philosophy of science, Dordrecht Boston: Kluwer Academic Publishers, pp. 161–194, ISBN 978-0-7923-4611-1.
- —— (1999), "Agential realism: feminist interventions in understanding scientific practices (1998)", in Biagioli, Mario (ed.), The science studies reader, New York, New York: Routledge, pp. 1–11, ISBN 978-0-415-91868-8.
- —— (2000), "Reconceiving scientific literacy as agential literacy, or learning how to intra-act responsibly within the world", in Traweek, Sharon; Reid, Roddey (eds.), Doing science + culture, New York: Routledge, pp. 221–258, ISBN 978-0-415-92112-1.
- —— (2001), "Re(con)figuring space, time, and matter", in DeKoven, Marianne (ed.), Feminist locations: global and local, theory and practice, New Brunswick, New Jersey: Rutgers University Press, pp. 75–109, ISBN 978-0-8135-2923-3.
- —— (2008), "Schrödinger's cat", in Smelik, Anneke; Lykke, Nina (eds.), Bits of life: feminism at the intersections of media, bioscience, and technology, Seattle: University of Washington Press, pp. 165–176, ISBN 978-0-295-98809-2.
- —— (2008), "Queer causation and the ethics of mattering", in Giffney, Noreen; Hird, Myra J. (eds.), Queering the non/human, Aldershot, Hampshire, England Burlington, Vermont: Ashgate, pp. 311–338, ISBN 978-0-7546-7128-2.
- —— (2012), "Was ist das Maß des Nichts? Unendlichkeit, Virtualität, Gerechtigkeit [What is the measure of nothingness? Infinity, virtuality, justice] (book number 099)", in Arnheim, Rudolf (ed.), dOCUMENTA (13) 100 Notizen – 100 Gedanken [dOCUMENTA (13) 100 notes – 100 thoughts] (in German and English), Ostfildern: Hatje Cantz, ISBN 978-3-7757-3129-4
- —— (2013), "Diffraktionen: Differenzen, Kontingenzen und Verschränkungen von Gewicht [Diffraction: differences, contingencies and entanglement of weight]", in Bath, Corinna; Meißner, Hanna; Trinkhaus, Stephan; Völker, Susanne (eds.), Geschlechter Interferenzen Wissensformen - Subjektivierungsweisen - Materialisierungen (in German), Berlin / Münster: Lit Verlag, pp. 27–68, ISBN 978-3-643-10904-0.
- —— (2017), "No Small Matter: Mushroom Clouds, Ecologies of Nothingness, and Strange Topologies of Spacetimemattering", in Bubandt, Nils; Gan, Elaine; Swanson, Heather; Tsing, Anna (eds.), Arts of Living on a Damaged Planet: Ghosts and Monsters of the Anthropocene, Minneapolis, Minnesota, United States: University of Minnesota Press, pp. G103–G120, ISBN 978-1-5179-0237-7.

=== Journal articles ===
- —— (1998). "Getting real: technoscientific practices and the materialization of reality". differences: A Journal of Feminist Cultural Studies. 10 (2): 87–128. OCLC 95847344. Abstract.
- —— (Spring 2003). "Posthumanist performativity: toward an understanding of how matter comes to matter". Signs. 28 (3): 801–831. doi:10.1086/345321. S2CID 16424758. Reprinted in various anthologies.
- —— (November 2010). "Quantum entanglements and hauntological relations of inheritance: dis/continuities, spacetime enfoldings, and justice-to-come". Derrida Today. 3 (2): 240–268. doi:10.3366/drt.2010.0206. S2CID 145491659.
- —— (2012). "On touching – the inhuman that therefore I am". differences: A Journal of Feminist Cultural Studies. 23 (3): 206–223. doi:10.1215/10407391-1892943.
- —— (2012). "Nature's queer performativity". Kvinder, Køn & Forskning. 1–2: 25–53.
- —— (2014). "Diffracting Diffraction: Cutting Together-Apart". Parallax. 20 (3): 168–187. doi:10.1080/13534645.2014.927623. ISSN 1353-4645. S2CID 145798180.
- —— (2017). "Troubling time/s and ecologies of nothingness: re-turning, re-membering, and facing the incalculable". New Formations. 92 (92): 56–86. doi:10.3898/NEWF:92.05.2017. S2CID 158674638.
- —— (2019). "After the End of the World: Entangled Nuclear Colonialisms, Matters of Force, and the Material Force of Justice". Theory & Event. 22 (3): 524–550. ISSN 1092-311X.
