= Sally Wyatt =

Researcher, director and professor

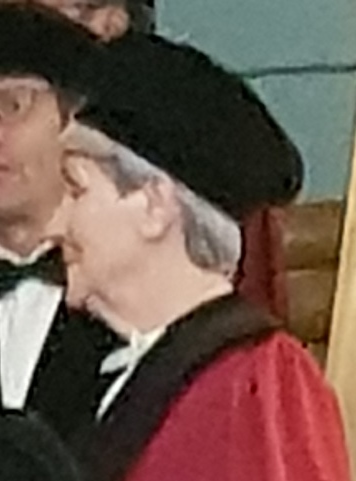
- April 2019
- Born: 12 May 1959 (age 67); Canada
- Education: McGill University (BA), Sussex University (MA), Maastricht University (PhD)
- Known for: Research on the Science and Technology Studies
- Scientific career
- Fields: Sociology, Sociology of Science, Science and Technology Studies
- Workplaces: Royal Netherlands Academy of Arts and Sciences, Maastricht University

Sally Wyatt (born 12 May 1959), is a researcher in Science and Technology Studies and the program Leader of the eHumanities group of the Royal Netherlands Academy of Arts and Sciences, director of The Netherlands Graduate Research School of Science, Technology and Modern Culture (WTMC) and professor of Digital Society Bachelor Course at Maastricht University.

Wyatt is known, among others, for her work on the non-users of technology, technological determinism, and the circulation of genetic data via the internet. As the internet became popularized in the late 1990s and early 2000s, the assumption was often made in popular media that everyone would ultimately embrace new technologies. Wyatt was the first to analyze the perspectives of non-users, meaning people who either purposefully avoided the internet or gave up using it after an initial period of use.

Wyatt was born in Canada. She holds a BA in economics from McGill University (1979), a master in Economic Policy & Planning from Sussex University (1980) and a PhD from Maastricht University (1998) under Wiebe Bijker.

Before moving to the Netherlands she worked at the Science Policy Research Unit (SPRU) at Sussex University, the Economic and Social Research Council, Centre for Research into Innovation and Management at Brighton University and the department of Innovation Studies at University of East London.

== Selected bibliography ==
=== Books ===
- Wyatt, Sally; Bertin, Gilles Y. (1988). Multinationals and industrial property: the control of the world's technology. Hemel Hempstead, Hertfordshire, England Atlantic Highlands, New Jersey: Harvester-Wheatsheaf Humanities Press International. ISBN 9780391035829.
- Wyatt, Sally (1998). Technology's arrow: developing information networks for public administration in Britain and the United States. Maastricht: UPM, Universitaire Pers Maastricht. ISBN 9789052782409.
- Wyatt, Sally (2000). Technology and in/equality questioning the information society. New York: Routledge. ISBN 9780203134504.
- Wyatt, Sally; Harris, Roma; Wathen, Nadine (2010). Configuring health consumers: health work and the imperative of personal responsibility. Houndmills, Basingstoke, Hampshire, New York: Palgrave Macmillan. OCLC 635463521.
- Wyatt, Sally; Beaulieu, Anne; Scharnhorst, Andrea; Wouters, Paul (2013). Virtual knowledge: experimenting in the humanities and the social sciences. Cambridge, Massachusetts: MIT Press. ISBN 9780262517911.

=== Chapters in books ===
- Wyatt, Sally (2005), "Non-users also matter: the construction of users and non-users of the internet", in Pinch, Trevor; Oudshoorn, Nellie (eds.), How users matter the co-construction of users and technology, Cambridge, Massachusetts: MIT Press, pp. 67–79, ISBN 9780262651097.

=== Academic journals ===
- Wyatt, Sally; Harris, Anna; Kelly, Susan E. (2014). "Autobiologies on YouTube: narratives of direct-to-consumer genetic testing". New Genetics and Society. 33 (1): 60–78. doi:10.1080/14636778.2014.884456. PMC 3996527. PMID 24772003.
- Wyatt, Sally; van Wesel, Maarten; ten Haaf, Jeroen (March 2014). "What a difference a colon makes: how superficial factors influence subsequent citation" (PDF). Scientometrics. 98 (3): 1601–1615. doi:10.1007/s11192-013-1154-x. hdl:20.500.11755/2fd7fc12-1766-4ddd-8f19-1d2603d2e11d. S2CID 18553863.
- Wyatt, Sally (September 2009). "Science and technology: socialising what for whom?". Journal of Science Communication. 8 (3). Sissa Medialab: C03. doi:10.22323/2.08030303.
