= Feminist technoscience =

Transdisciplinary branch of science studies

Feminist technoscience is a transdisciplinary branch of science studies which emerged from decades of feminist critique on the way gender and other identity markers are entangled in the combined fields of science and technology. The term technoscience, especially in regard to the field of feminist technoscience studies, seeks to remove the distinction between scientific research and development with applied applications of technology while assuming science is entwined with the common interests of society. As a result, science is suggested to be held to the same level of political and ethical accountability as the technologies which develop from it. Feminist technoscience studies continue to develop new theories on how politics of gender and other identity markers are interconnected to resulting processes of technical change, and power relations of the globalized, material world.

Feminist technoscience focuses less on intrapersonal relationships between men and women, and more on broader issues concerning knowledge production and how bodies manifest and are acknowledged in societies.

Feminist technoscience studies are inspired by social constructionist approaches to gender, sex, intersectionalities, and science, technology and society (STS). It can also be referred to as feminist science studies, feminist STS, feminist cultural studies of science, feminist studies of science and technology, and gender and science.

== History ==
According to Judy Wajcman, the concept of technology has historically been bound to indigenous women. The roles of harvesters, or caretakers of the domestic economy taken up by these women lead Wajcman to conclude they would have created tools such as the sickle and the pestle, making them the first technologists. During the eighteenth century, industrial engineering began to constitute the modern definition of technology. This transformed the meaning from including useful arts technology – such as needlework, metalwork, weaving, and mining – to strictly applied science. As a result, "male machines" replaced the "female fabrics" as identifiers of modern technology when engineering was considered a masculine profession. Due to political movements of the 1960s and early 70s, science and technology were considered as industrial, governmental, and/or militaristic based practices, which were associated with masculinity, thus resulting in a lack of feminist discourse. Feminist scholarship identified the absence of women's presence in technological and scientific spheres, due to the use of sex stereotyping in education and sexual discrimination in the workforce, as well as the development of technology as a masculine construct. Examples of masculine-coded technologies under these categories included ARPANET, a precursor to the internet developed by the United States Department of Defence, and the Manhattan Project.

The women's health movements of the 1970s in the United States and the United Kingdom provided momentum to the emergence of feminist politics around scientific knowledge. During the early states of second-wave feminism, campaigns for improved birth control and abortion rights were at the forefront in challenging the consolidation of male dominated sciences and technologies at the expense of women's health. After the first successful birth of a child using in vitro fertilization technology, critiques of reproductive technologies rapidly grew. In the 1970s and 1980s, there were fears that oppressive population policies would be enacted, since men could use technology to appropriate the reproductive abilities of women. For many feminist activists, such as Gena Corea and Maria Mies, such technologies changed women's bodies into industrialized factories for the production of more human beings, which these feminist activists viewed as another way of continuing the subjugation of women in society. Others viewed the act of regaining knowledge and control over women's bodies as a crucial component to women's liberation.Further advances in reproductive technologies allowed the possibility to allow new family types and lifestyles to form, beyond the heterosexual family unit.

Science was originally seen as an alien entity opposed to women's interests. Sciences and technologies developed under the misconception that women's needs were universal and inferior to the needs of men, forcing women into rigid, determined sex roles. A shift happened in the 1980s – Sandra Harding proposed "the female question in science" to raise "the question of the science in feminism", claiming that science is involved in projects that are not only neutral and objective, but that are strongly linked to male interests. The conceptualization of science and technology was expanded to reflect the all-pervasive ways in which technology is encountered in daily life, gaining attention of feminists out of concern for female positions in science and technological professions. Rather than asking how women can be better treated within and by science, feminist critics instead chose to focus on how a science deeply involved in masculinity and masculine projects could be used for the emancipation of women.

Today's feminist critique often uses the former demonology of technology as a point of departure to tell a story of progress from liberal to postmodern feminism. According to Judy Wajcman, both liberal and Marxist feminists failed in the analysis of science and technology, because they considered the technology as neutral and did not pay attention to the symbolic dimension of technoscience.

== Feminist technologies and technoscience studies ==
Feminist technoscience studies have become intrinsically linked with practices of Technofeminism and the development of feminist technologies in cultural and critical vernacular. Feminist technoscience studies explore the coded social and historical implications of science and technology on the development of society, including how identity constructs and is constructed by these technologies. Technofeminism emerged in the early 1980s, leaning on the different feminist movements. Feminist scholars reanalyzed the Scientific Revolution, and stated that the resulting science was based on the masculine ideology of exploiting the Earth and control. During this time, nature and scientific inquiry were modelled after misogynous relationships to women. Femininity was associated with nature and considered as something passive to be objectified. This was in contrast to culture, which was represented by objectifying masculinity. This analysis depended on the use of gender imagery to conceptualize the nature of technoscientific masculine ideology.

Judy Wajcman draws parallels between Judith Butler's theory of gender performativity and the construction of technology. Butler conceives gender as a performative act as opposed to a naturalized condition one is born into. Through a fluctuating process achieved in daily social interaction, gender identity is acted and constructed through relational behaviours – it is a fluid concept. Drawing from the work of Butler and Donna Haraway, Amade M'charek analyzes how objects, when linked to another object or signifier, construct identity through the use of human imagination:

Differences and similarities may be stable or not, depending on the maintenance work that goes into the relations that help to produce them. They are neither fundaments nor qualities that are always embodied… Differences are relational. They do not always materialize in bodies (in the flesh, genes, hormones, brains, or the skin). Rather they materialize in the very relations that help to enact them.

In this theory, identity is not the byproduct of genes, but the constant upholding of hierarchical difference relations. Differences in identity are the effect of interferences, performing and enacting and being enacted upon. Technology too, as proposed by Wajcman, is a product of mutual alliances, not objectively given but collectively created in a process of reiteration. To this end, technology exists as both a source and a concurrence of identity relations.

Western technology and science is deeply implicated in the masculine projection and patriarchal domination of women and nature. After the shift of feminist theory to focus more on technoscience, there was a call for new technology to be based on the needs and values of women, rather than masculine dominated technological development. The differences between female and male needs were asserted by feminist movements, drawing attention to the exclusion of women being served by current technologies. Reproductive technologies in particular were influenced by this movement. During this time, household technologies, new media, and new technosciences were, for the most part, disregarded.

=== Feminist technologies ===
Feminist technologies are ones that are formed from feminist social relations, but varied definitions and layers of feminism complicate the definition. Deborah Johnson proposes four candidates for feminist technologies:

- Technologies that are good for women
- Technologies that constitute gender-equitable social relations
- Technologies that favor women
- Technologies that constitute social relations that are more equitable than those that were constituted by a prior technology or than those that prevail in the wider society

The successes of certain technologies, such as the pap smear for cervical cancer testing, relied on the feminization of technician jobs. The intervention of women outside the technological sphere, like from members of the women's health movement, and public health activists also aided in the tool's development. However, other feminist technologies, such as birth control serve as an example of a feminist technology also shaped in part by dominant masculinity.

Combined oral contraceptive pills were first approved for use in the United States in 1960, during the time of the women's liberation movement. The birth control pill helped make it possible for more women to enter the workforce by giving them the ability to control their own fertility. Decades prior to this, activists such as Margaret Sanger and Katharine McCormick fought for female contraceptives, seeing it as a necessity for the emancipation of women. However, in the 1970s feminists raised critique on male control of the medical and pharmaceutical industry. The male domination of these fields led technologies such as oral contraceptives to be developed around what men considered to be universal, defining characteristics of women (these being their sex and reproductive capabilities). Birth control pills themselves also succeeded in perpetrating and creating this universality – shaped by moral considerations of the natural body, the length of the menstrual cycle was able to be engineered.

Feminist work in design including fields like industrial design, graphic design and fashion design parallels work on feminist technoscience and feminist technology. Isabel Prochner examines feminist design processes and the development of feminist artefacts and technology, stressing that the process should:

- Emphasize human life and flourishing over output and growth
- Follow best practices in labor, international production and trade
- Take place in an empowering workspace
- Involve non-hierarchical, interdisciplinary and collaborative work
- Address user needs at multiple levels, including support for pleasure, fun and happiness
- Create thoughtful products for female users
- Create good jobs through production, execution and sale of the design solution

=== Bioethics and capitalism ===
The development of reproductive technologies blur the lines between nature and technology, allowing for the reconfiguration of life itself. Through the advances of genetic technologies, the controlling of pregnancy, childbirth, and motherhood has become increasingly possible through intrusive means. These advances in biotechnology are serving to develop life as a commodity and deepen monetary inequality - a link made by feminist theorists such as Donna Haraway. Genetic engineering also brings about questions in eugenics, leading early radical feminist analysis to declare and attempt to reclaim motherhood as a foundation of female identity. The idea of a green, natural motherhood was popularized by ecofeminists who celebrated the identification of women with nature, and natural life.

Haraway instead chooses to embrace technology as feminist instead of reverting to this idea of naturalized femininity. By embracing the image of the cyborg, an amalgamation that is neither human/animal nor machine, Haraway explores the ideas of technoscience and gender, conceptualizing a space where gender is an arbitrary, unnecessary construct.

The corporatization of biology through the alteration of nature through technology is also a theme explored by Haraway. The OncoMouse is a laboratory mouse genetically modified to carry a specific gene which increases the creature's chance of developing cancer. Until 2005, American conglomerate DuPoint owned the patent to the OncoMouse, reconfiguring and relegating life to a commodity. This development in genetic engineering brings up questions about lab animal treatment, as well as ethical questions around class and race. Increasing breast cancer rates in Black women are discussed in ecofeminist analysis of the modification of lab animals from breast cancer research to being the discussion into an ethically ambiguous space. Haraway in particular raises the question of whether modifying and expending a live commodity like OncoMouse is ethical if it leads to the development of a cure for breast cancer.

The reconfiguring of life in biotechnologies and genetic engineering allow for a precedence to be set, leading to capitalist cultural consequences. Through these technologies technoscience becomes naturalized, and also becomes increasingly subject to the process of commodification and capital accumulation in transnational capitalist corporations. Similar to Marxist and Neo-Marxist analyses of sciences, biotechnologies allow for the concept of commodity to become fetishized as genes are reified to have a monetary value outside of use value. This also positions life and nature as things to be exploited by capitalism.

== See also ==
- Cyberfeminism
- Digital rhetoric
- Annemarie Mol
- Donna Haraway
- Evelyn Fox Keller
- John Law
- Judy Wajcman
- Karen Barad
- Lucy Suchman
- Nina Lykke
- Sandra Harding
- TechnoFeminism
