= Enactment (psychology) =

Term in relational psychoanalysis

In relational psychoanalysis, the term enactment is used to describe the non-reflecting playing out of a mental scenario, rather than verbally describing the associated thoughts and feelings.

The term was first introduced by Theodore Jacobs (1986) to describe the re-actualization of unsymbolized and unconscious emotional experiences involved in the relationship between the patient and the therapist. More precisely, Jacobs refers to the countertransference enactment, highlighting the implications of the personality characteristics, affective frame, representations and analyst's conflicts for the patient and the interactional behaviour.

In relational psychoanalysis, the concept of enactment is usually used to explain the re–experience of a role assumed during childhood, which is recited on the stage of the analyst's consulting room. The analyst is given a specific role to play, and in this context both the patient and the analyst lose their sense of distance, interacting with each other verbally and non–verbally to create intra-psychic dynamics in the form of interactions within the therapeutic setting.

According to relational theorists, though enactments are unconscious patterns of dyadic interactions to which both the analyst and the patient contribute, they are generally considered to be initiated by the patient. In the perspective of relational psychoanalysis, the central aspect of therapeutic change is given by the liberation of the patient and the analyst from the repetitive unconscious patterns due to the reflective awareness' acquisition of the relational interchange and the contribution of both parties.

Traumatized patients tend to bond with their therapists not so much through words as through enactments, expressing unconsciously—by the action—the dissociated aspects of the self and the object representation.
