= Materiality (social sciences and humanities) =

In the social sciences, materiality is the notion that the physical properties of a cultural artifact have consequences for how the object is used. Some scholars expand this definition to encompass a broader range of actions, such as the process of making art, and the power of organizations and institutions to orient activity around themselves. The concept of materiality is used across many disciplines within the social sciences to focus attention on the impact of material or physical factors. Scholars working in science and technology studies, anthropology, organization studies (see materiality turn), or communication studies may incorporate materiality as a dimension of their investigations. Central figures in the social scientific study of materiality are Harold Innis and Marshall McLuhan.

== Communication studies ==
Communication studies scholars use theories of materiality when investigating the impact of media such as newspapers, radio, television, personal computing and the Internet. Collectively, these are termed “media effects” studies. In conjunction with materiality, some communication scholars make use of the concept of affordance: the idea that the features of a particular technology may encourage certain behaviours from the technology's users. Other scholars explore how technologies and the communities that use them may be mutually determining (the way users respond to technology tends to drive both features and cultural norms among users of that technology) or they may behave as co-creators (the abilities and limitations of a technology may make it a part of the works created using that technology).

== Science and technology studies ==
Although science and technology studies (STS) are typically associated with a social constructivist viewpoint, some STS scholars (e.g. Langdon Winner) incorporate materiality into their studies of technology and explore how the affordances of technology may shape or even control their use. Actor-network theory, or ANT, is an example of an STS theory which incorporates both social and material interactions.

== Toronto School ==
The Toronto School view of materiality, also known as the ‘medium’ view, includes the intellectual legacies of Innis and McLuhan, who focused attention on the consequences of the medium, on what authors communicate and on what audiences experience. Innis explored the broad historical consequences of time-bound media (e.g. transportable but fragile media such as papyrus) and space-bound media (e.g. hard-to-transport but longer-lasting media such as stone tablets). Different cultures have used various media to store information and its availability and transportability through time impacts its use. In an extension of Innis' ideas, McLuhan wrote, “The medium is the message”, that is, the way people transmit ideas is consequential in and of itself. The influence of the medium can be invisible and difficult to characterize.
