= Agential realism =

Methaphysical theory

Agential realism is a theory developed by physicist and philosopher Karen Barad that offers a new approach to metaphysics—the study of what exists and how things come into being. Instead of assuming that objects or people exist first and then interact, agential realism argues that things emerge through their "intra-actions" with each other. Barad develops the notion of intra-action to emphasize that entities do not exist as separate individuals before they relate—they are formed through their connections, which leaves the problem of iteration unsolved.

This approach challenges the traditional idea that the world is made up of separate, independent parts. Agential realism has been influential in fields such as science studies, philosophy, and feminist theory, particularly in discussions about how knowledge, matter, and meaning are deeply connected.

== Background ==
Much of Barad's scholarly work has revolved around their concept of "agential realism," and their theories hold importance for many academic fields, including science studies, STS (Science, Technology, and Society), feminist technoscience, philosophy and philosophy of science, feminist theory, and physics. In addition to Bohr, their work draws a great deal on the works of Michel Foucault and Judith Butler, as demonstrated in their influential article in the feminist journal differences, "Getting Real: Technoscientific Practices and the Materialization of Reality."

== Summary ==
For Barad, phenomena or objects do not precede their interaction, rather, 'objects' emerge through particular intra-actions. Thus, apparatuses, which produce phenomena, are not assemblages of humans and nonhumans (as in actor-network theory). Rather, they are the condition of possibility of 'humans' and 'non-humans', not merely as ideational concepts, but in their materiality. Apparatuses are 'material-discursive' in that they produce determinate meanings and material beings while simultaneously excluding the production of others. What it means to matter is therefore always material-discursive. Barad takes their inspiration from physicist Niels Bohr, one of the founders of quantum physics. Barad's agential realism is at once an epistemology (theory of knowing), an ontology (theory of being), and an ethics. For this, Barad employs the term onto-epistemology. Because specific practices of mattering have ethical consequences, excluding other kinds of mattering, onto-epistemological practices are always in turn onto-ethico-epistemological.

Barad's original training was in theoretical physics. Their book, Meeting the Universe Halfway, (2007), includes in-depth discussions of Stern–Gerlach experiments, Bell inequalities, delayed-choice quantum eraser experiments, the Kochen–Specker theorem and other topics in quantum physics from Barad's neo-Bohrian perspective. In this book, Barad also argues that 'agential realism,' is useful to the analysis of literature, social inequalities, and many other things. This claim is based on the fact that Barad's agential realism is a way of understanding the politics, ethics, and agencies of any act of observation, and indeed any kind of knowledge practice. According to Barad, the deeply connected way that everything is entangled with everything else means that any act of observation makes a "cut" between what is included and excluded from what is being considered. Nothing is inherently separate from anything else, but separations are temporarily enacted so one can examine something long enough to gain knowledge about it. This view of knowledge provides a framework for thinking about how culture and habits of thought can make some things visible and other things easier to ignore or to never see. For this reason, according to Barad, agential realism is useful for any kind of feminist analysis, even if the connection to science is not apparent.

=== Arguments ===
Barad's framework makes several other arguments, and some of them are part of larger trends in fields such as science studies and feminist technoscience:

- They define agency as a relationship and not as something that one "has."
- The scientist is always part of the apparatus, and one needs to understand that her/their/his participation is needed in order to make scientific work more accurate and more rigorous. This differs from the view that political critiques of science seek to undermine the credibility of science; instead, Barad argues that this kind of critique actually makes for better, more credible science.
- They argue that politics and ethical issues are always part of scientific work, and only are made to seem separate by specific historical circumstances that encourage people to fail to see those connections. They use the example of the ethics of developing nuclear weapons to argue this point, by claiming that the ethics and politics are part of how such weapons were developed and understood, and therefore part of science, and not merely of the "philosophy of science" or the "ethics of science." This differs from the usual view that one can strive for a politics-free, bias-less science.
- Nevertheless, they argue against moral relativism, which, according to Barad, uses science's "human" aspects as an excuse to treat all knowledge, and all ethical frameworks, as equally false. They use Michael Frayn's play Copenhagen as an example of the kind of moral relativism that they find problematic.
- They also reject the idea that science is "only" a language game or set of fictions produced only by human constructions and concepts. Although the scientist is part of the "intra-action" of the experiment, humans (and their cultural constructs) do not have complete control over everything that happens. Barad expresses this point by saying, in Getting Real, that although scientists shape knowledge about the universe, you can't ignore the way the universe "kicks back."

== Reception ==
These points on science, agency, ethics, and knowledge reveal that Barad's work is similar to the projects of other science studies scholars such as Andrew Pickering, and Evelyn Fox Keller. Barad's notion of "phenomenon" has also been compared to analogous concepts in the work of Ian Hacking and Nancy Cartwright.

Barad's work has generally been received more positively within feminist technoscience than within mainstream science, technology and society studies (STS).

== Critique ==
Karen Barad's agential realism collapses ontology and epistemology into an undifferentiated field of "intra-action," where entities and meanings continually emerge through temporary "cuts." While this framework aspires to decenter human exceptionalism, it ultimately reproduces the very anthropocentrism it seeks to escape by projecting a human concept of agency—rooted in Enlightenment individualism—onto all matter. In dissolving distinction, history, and persistence, Barad's model erases the spatial, temporal, and ethical conditions that make accountability possible. Her universal entanglement displaces the situatedness of knowledge and relation that thinkers such as Donna Haraway and Indigenous scholars insist upon, flattening plural ontologies into a monistic metaphysics that cannot accommodate place, memory, or obligation. In this way, agential realism abstracts the relational into the universal, transforming connection into a totalizing ontology that forecloses the very geography, history, and responsibility it claims to illuminate.

== See also ==
- New materialism
