= José Orlandis =

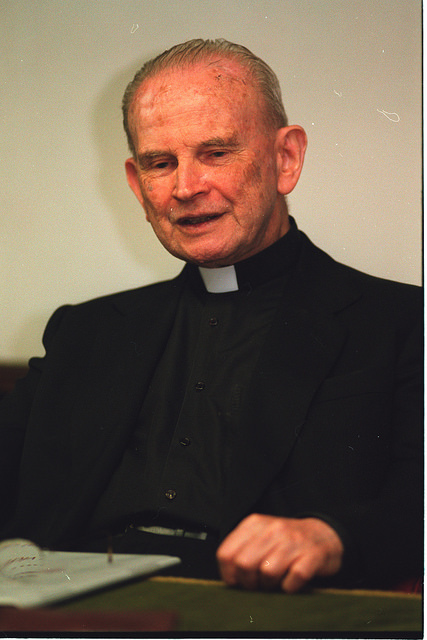

José Orlandis Rovira (29 April 1918 – 24 December 2010) was a Spanish Roman Catholic priest and historian who wrote more than 200 works, including 20 books.

Orlandis became a university professor of law in 1942, and was ordained a priest of Opus Dei in 1946. Much of his work centered on Visigothic Spain and Western Medieval Church.

== Works ==
- Estudios visigóticos (1956)
- El poder real y la sucesión al trono en la monarquía visigoda (1962)
- Tres estudios históricos sobre la colegialidad episcopal (1965)
- La crisís de la universidad en España (1967)
- Estudios sobre instituciones monásticas medievales (1971)
- La Iglesia antigua y medieval (1974)
- Historia social y económica de la España visigoda (1975)
- La Iglesia en la España visigótica y medieval (1976)
- Historia de España: la España visigótica (1977) ISBN 978-8424934965
- Die Synoden auf der Iberischen Halbinsel bis zum Einbruch des Islam (711) (Konziliengeschichte) (1981) ISBN 978-3-506-74681-8
- 8 bienaventuranzas (NT Religión) (1982)
- Hispania y Zaragoza en la Antigüedad tardía: estudios varios (1984) ISBN 978-8450504651
- Época visigoda (409-711) (1987)
- Historia del reino visigodo español (1988) ISBN 978-8432137525
- La vida en España en tiempo de los godos (1991) ISBN 978-8432148651
- Semblanzas visigodas (1992) ISBN 978-8432128301
- A Short History of the Catholic Church. Scepter Publishers. 1993. ISBN 978-1-85182-125-9.
- Años de juventud en el Opus Dei (1993) ISBN 978-8432130267
- El Pontificado romano en la historia (1996) ISBN 978-8482391229
- Estudios de historia eclesiástica visigoda (Colección Historia de la Iglesia) (1998) ISBN 978-8431315726
- Historia de la Iglesia: Iniciación Teológica (2001)
- Historia del reino visigodo español: los acontecimientos, las instituciones, la sociedad, los protagonistas (2003) ISBN 978-8432134692
