= Paris 8 University =

Public university in Paris, France

- Université Paris-VIII
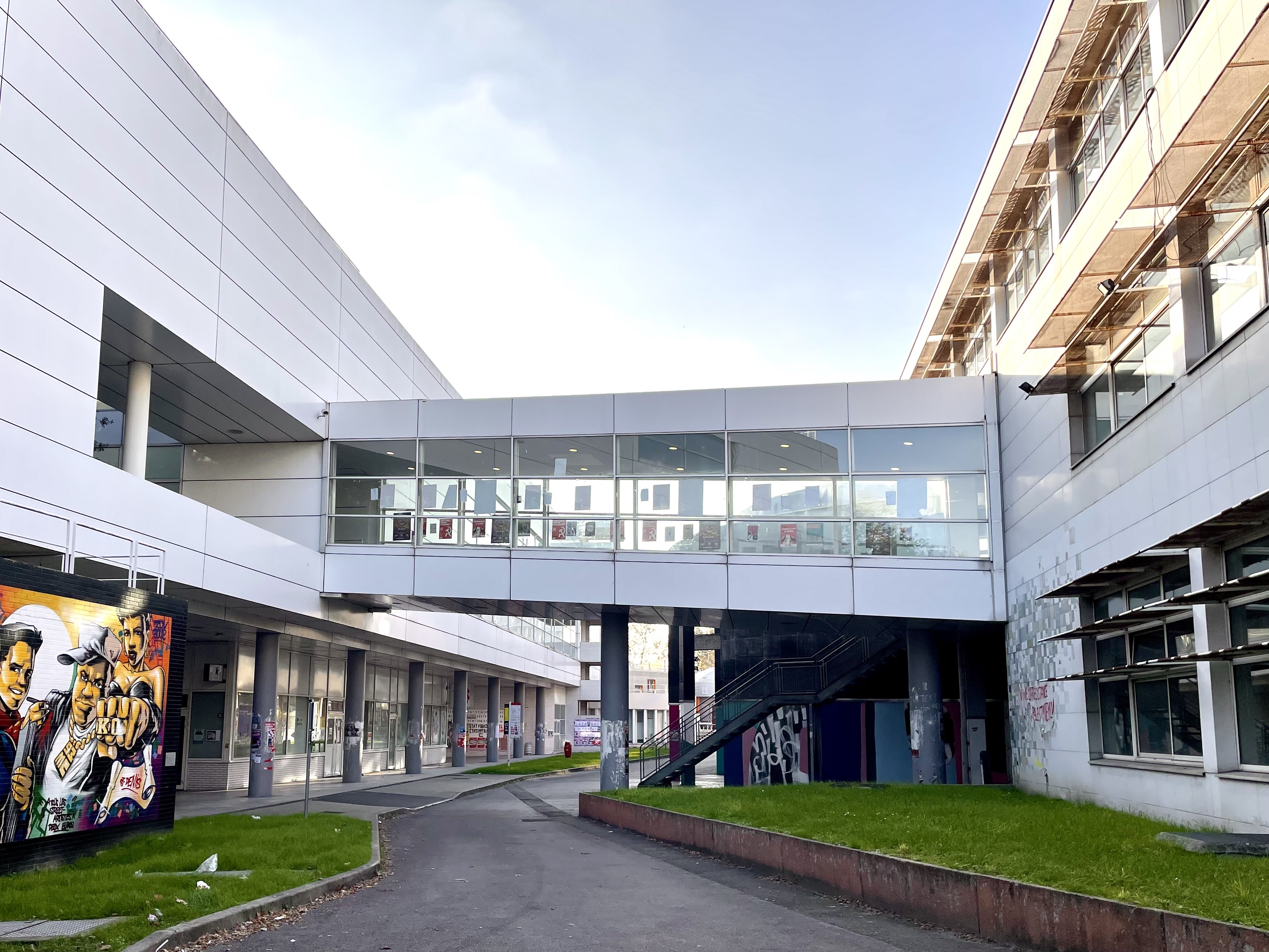
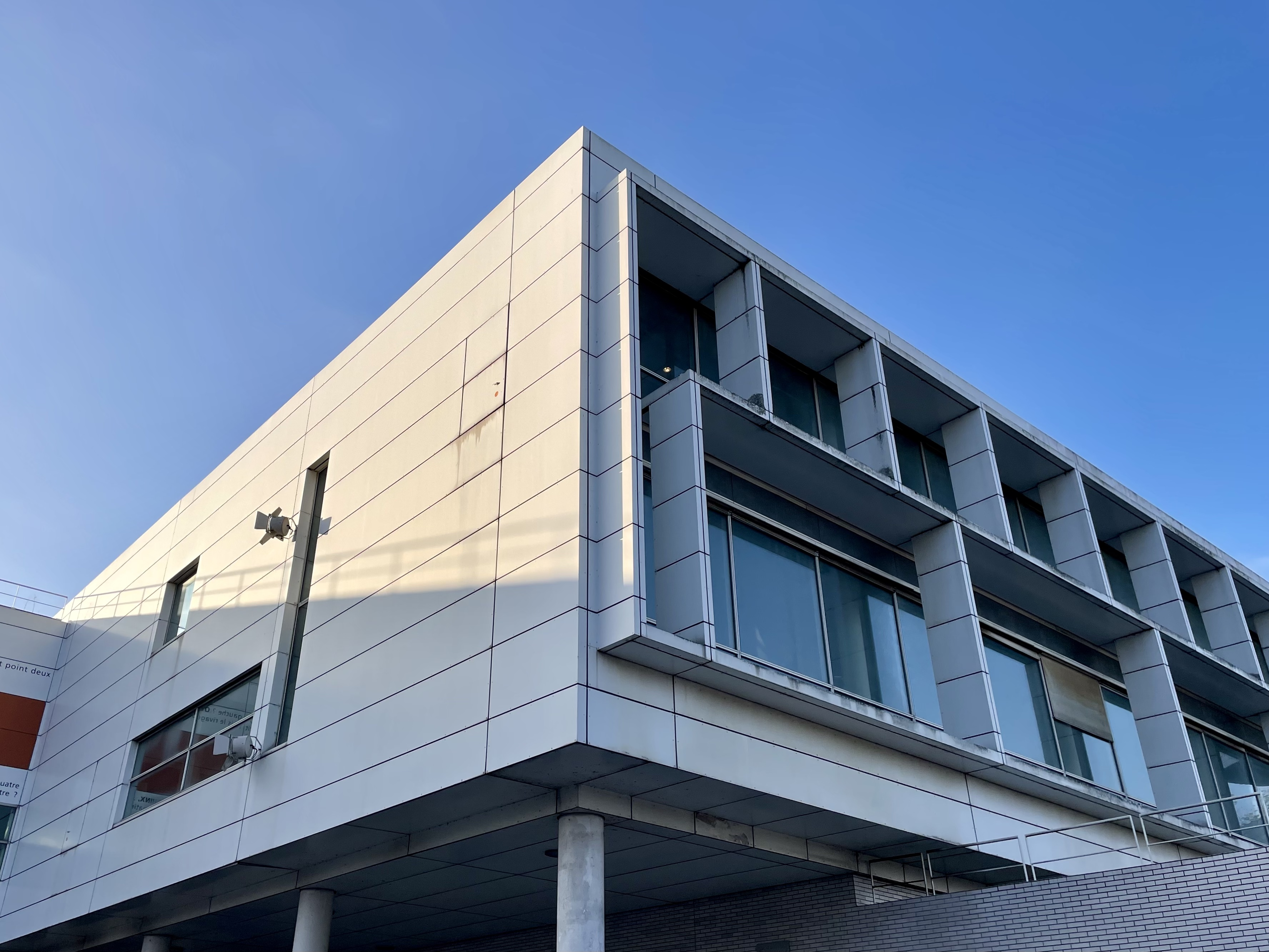
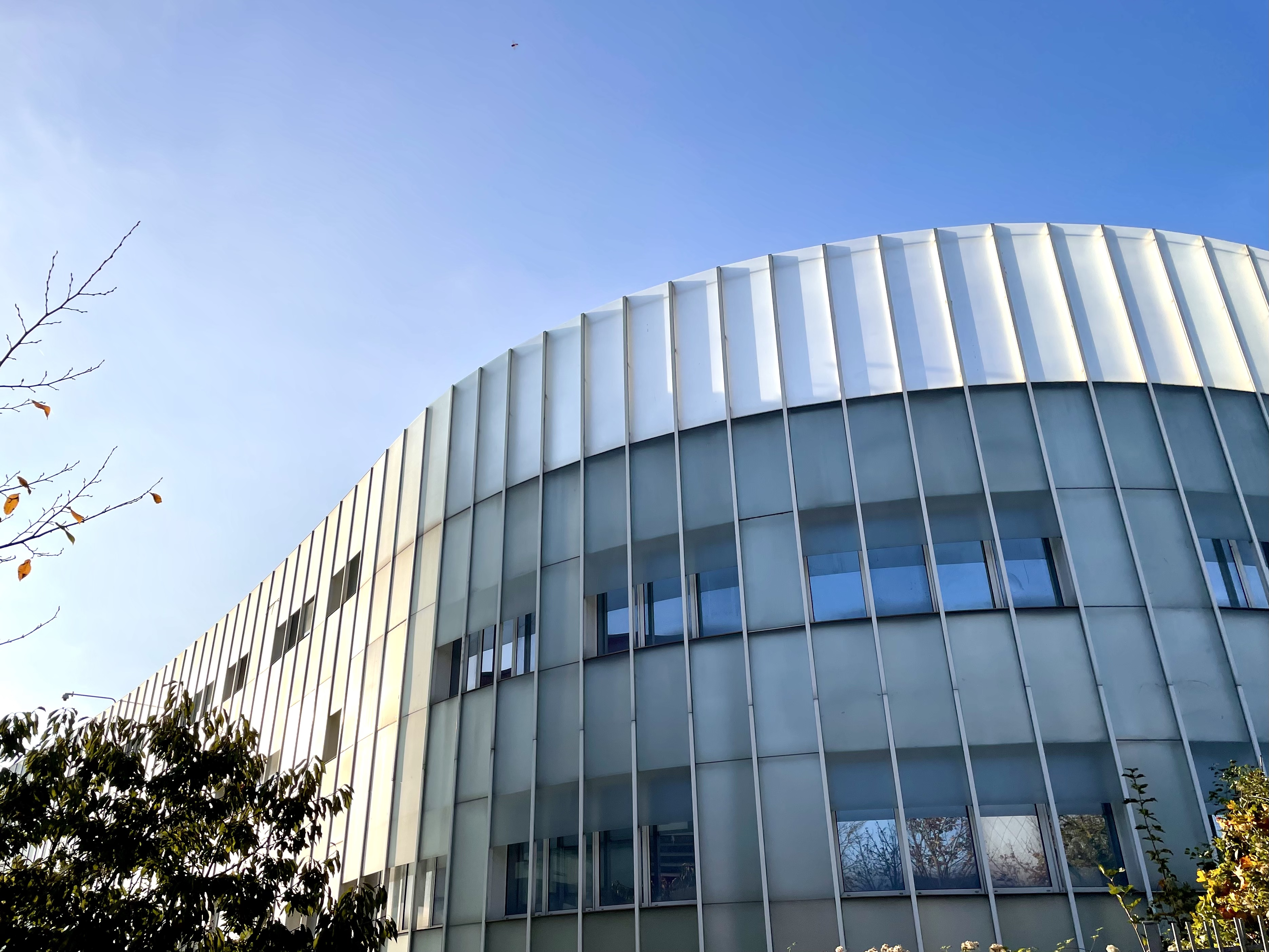
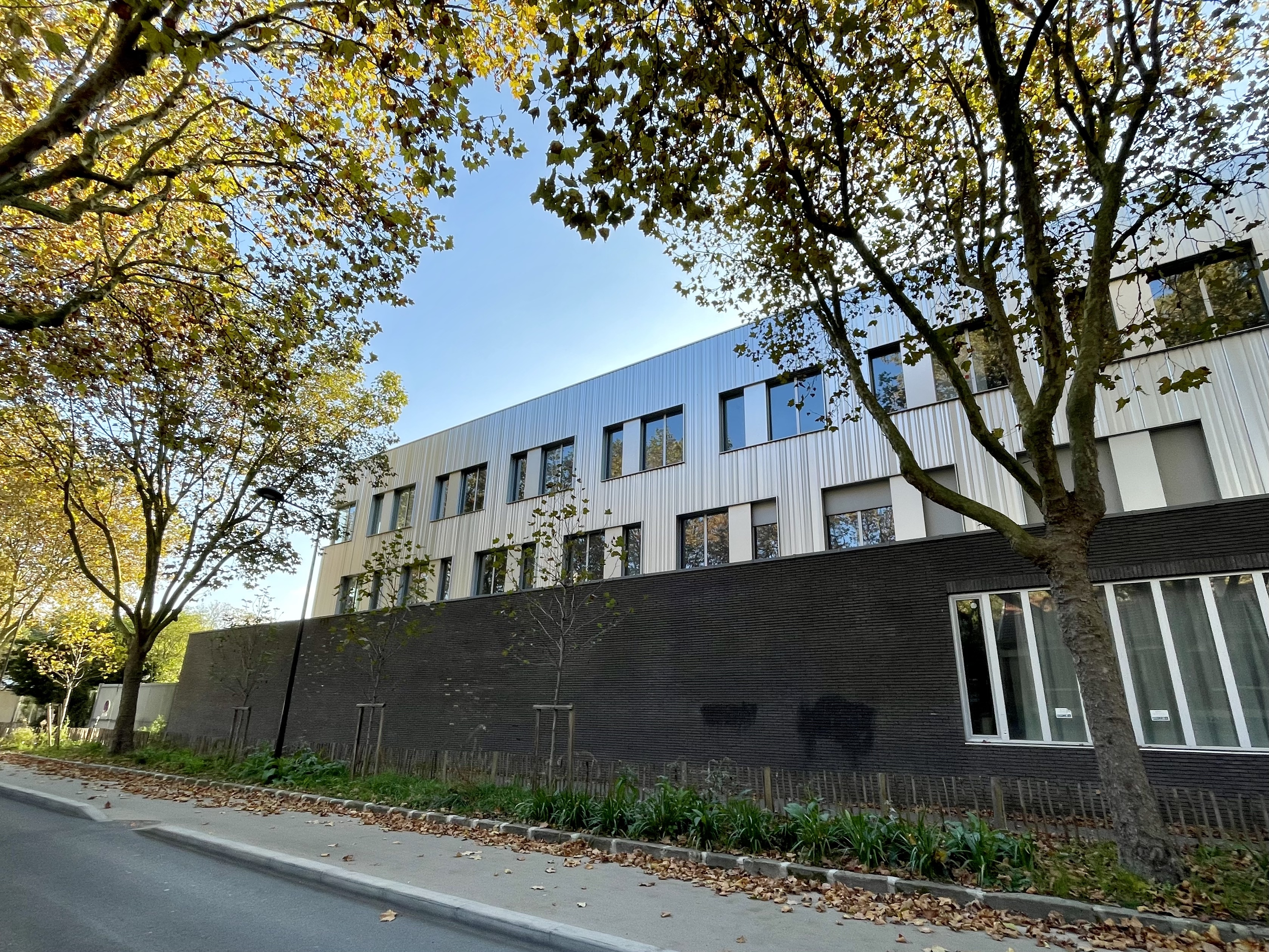
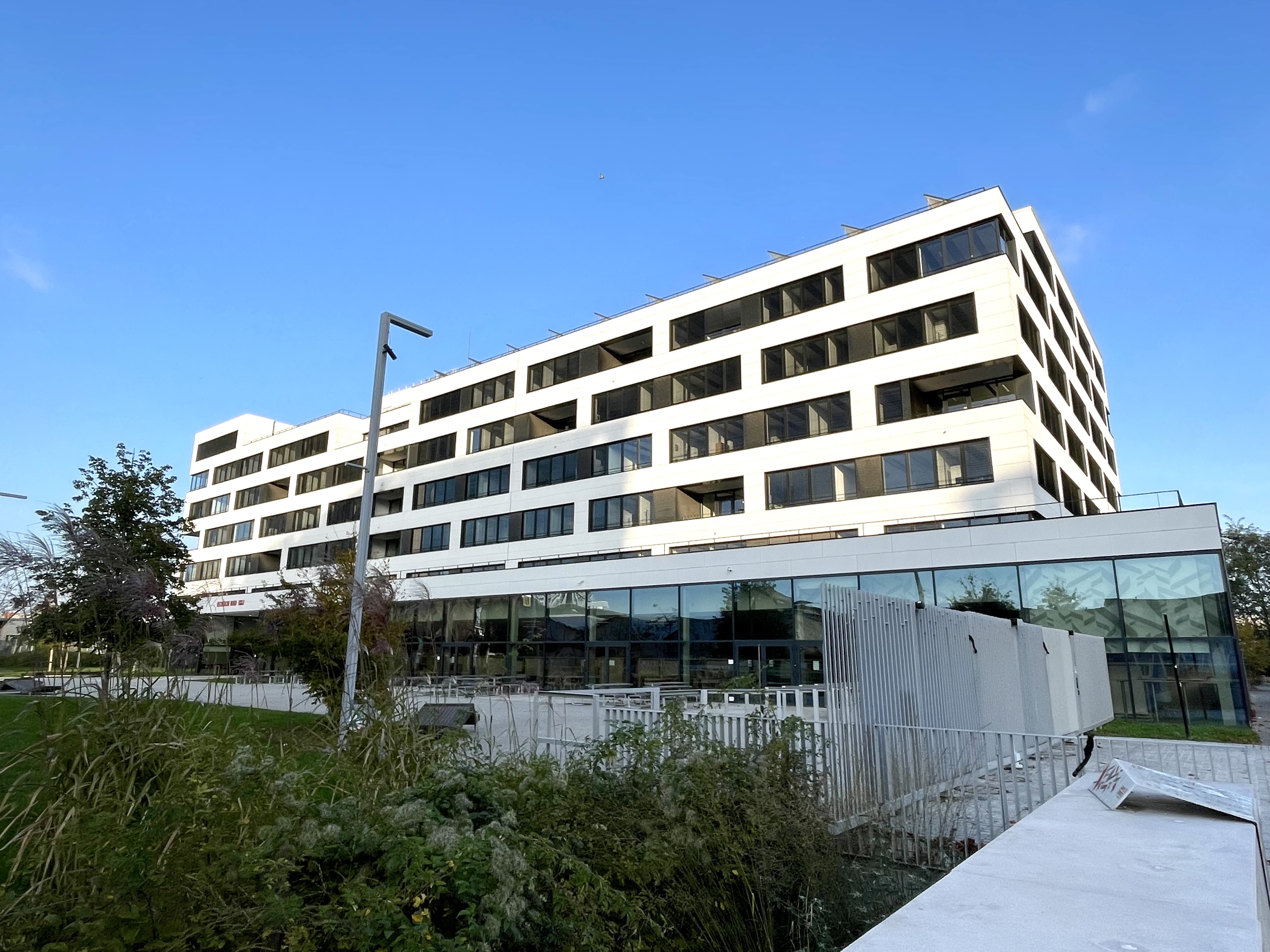
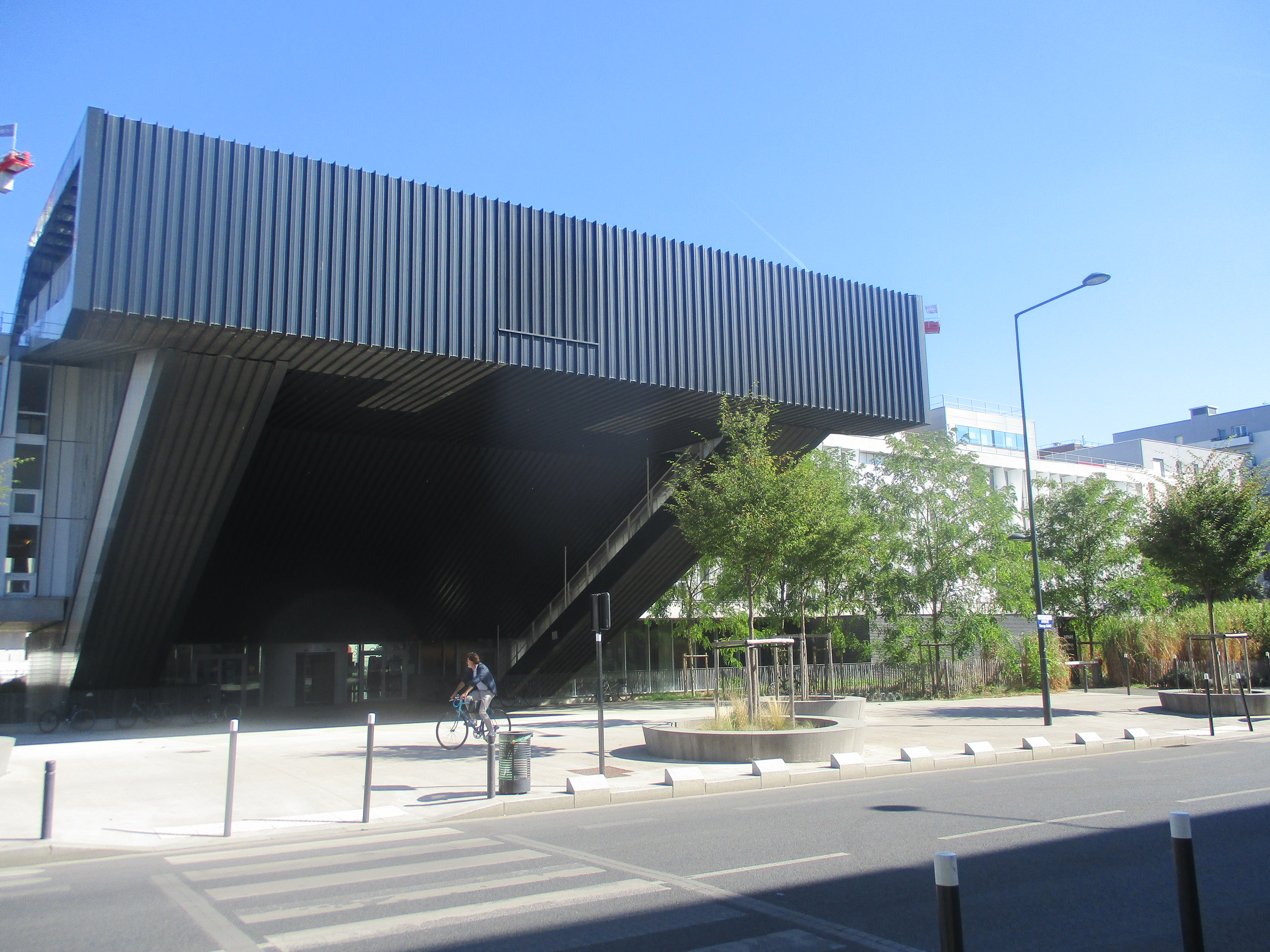
- Motto: Université des créations
- Motto in English: University of creations
- Type: Public
- Established: 1969 as CUEV; full university status: 1971
- Academic affiliations: Chancellery of the Universities of Paris; UNIMED
- Endowment: €113 million (2013)
- Chancellor: Annick Allaigre
- Undergraduates: 14,070
- Postgraduates: 6,259
- Location: Saint-Denis, Aubervilliers, Paris, France; 48°56′41″N 2°21′48″E
- Website: univ-paris8.fr/en

Paris 8 University (French: Université Paris 8), also known as the University of Vincennes in Saint-Denis, Paris VIII, or Paris 8, is a public university in Greater Paris, France. Once part of the historic University of Paris, it is now an autonomous public institution.

It is based on several campuses, mainly in Saint-Denis, as well as in Aubervilliers and the north of Paris on the Condorcet Campus, which it has initiated with nine other universities and public institutions since 2008 and which was inaugurated in 2019.

It is one of the thirteen successors of the University of Paris, and was established shortly before the latter officially ceased to exist on 31 December 1970. It was founded as a direct response to events of May 1968, as a campus of the University of Paris in Vincennes. This response was twofold: it was sympathetic to students' demands for more freedom, but also represented the movement of students out of central Paris, especially the Latin Quarter, where the street fighting of 1968 had taken place.

== History ==
Founded on 13 January 1969, the new experimental institution was named Centre Universitaire Expérimental de Vincennes (CUEV) in Vincennes. In 1971, it gained full university status, thus allowing it to award its own degrees, and renamed University of Vincennes, then University of Paris-VIII. Since moving to Saint-Denis in 1980, the university has become a major teaching and research centre for humanities in the Île-de-France region.

=== Foundation ===
On 5 August 1968, the Dean of the Faculty of Letters of the University of Paris, Raymond Las Vergnas, proposed the creation of a new university to Edgar Faure, the Minister of National Education. Las Vergnas was accompanied by professors Pierre Dommergues, Bernard Cassen and a young female lecturer in English, Hélène Cixous. Two days later, Cixous sent a telegram to her friend Jacques Derrida, asking him to be his advisor. Through Derrida, Cixous recruited Georges Canguilhem and Roland Barthes, who became official advisors.

=== Tumultuous years ===
As soon as it opened in 1971, the University of Vincennes became the venue for a continuation of 1968, being occupied almost immediately by student radicals, and being the scene of violent confrontations with the police. One incident, in early 1972, involved a janitors' strike. The radicalized janitors invaded classrooms, accused the professors of being scabs, and demanded solidarity.

It became known for its radical philosophy department, with many faculty considering themselves communist which was at the time headed by Michel Foucault, who in this stage of his career was at his most militant, on one occasion participating in a student occupation and pelting the police outside the building with projectiles.

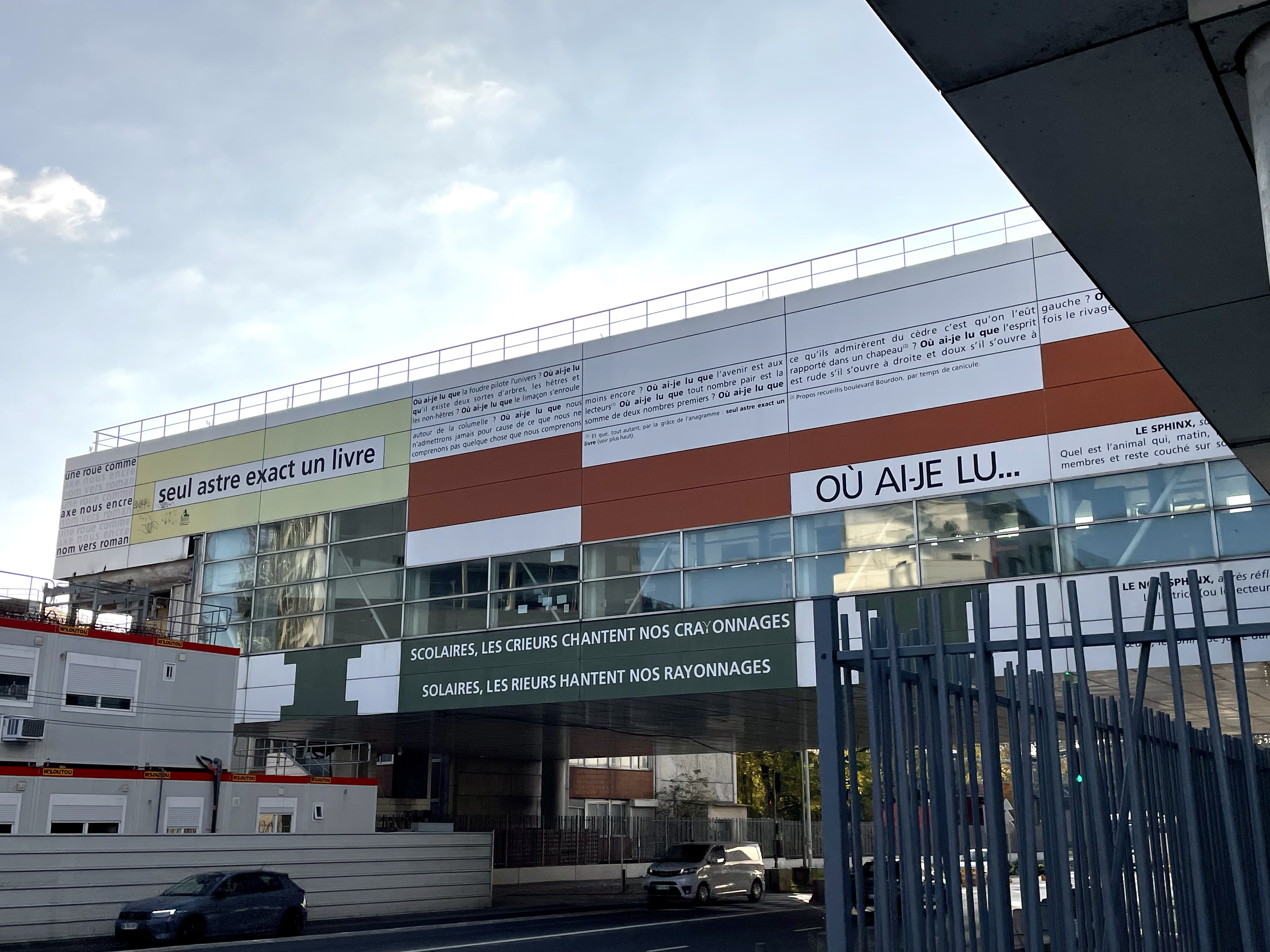
The footbridge of the Paris 8 University Library, in 2024.

The most consequential scandal of this department emerged around one of the philosophy professors, Jacques Lacan's daughter Judith Miller. The department had its accreditation withdrawn after it was revealed that Miller had handed out course credit to strangers she met on a bus. Miller was subsequently fired by the French education ministry after saying in a radio interview that the university was a capitalist institution and that she was trying to sabotage it from within.

=== Recent reforms ===
Since the turmoil in the late 1960s, the University of Vincennes has endorsed a far more mainstream academic life and has brought in new departments, new professors, and national rules to effect this change.

In 1980, the university was relocated to the suburb of Saint-Denis, to the north of Paris. The university's capacity of 24,000 students per year makes "Paris VIII" an important university with internationally recognized departments in Philosophy, Political Sciences, Cinema Arts, Communication Studies, and Feminist Studies.

In 1992 and 1998, the University of Paris-VIII created two university technical institutes (in French: IUT), in Tremblay-en-France and Montreuil.

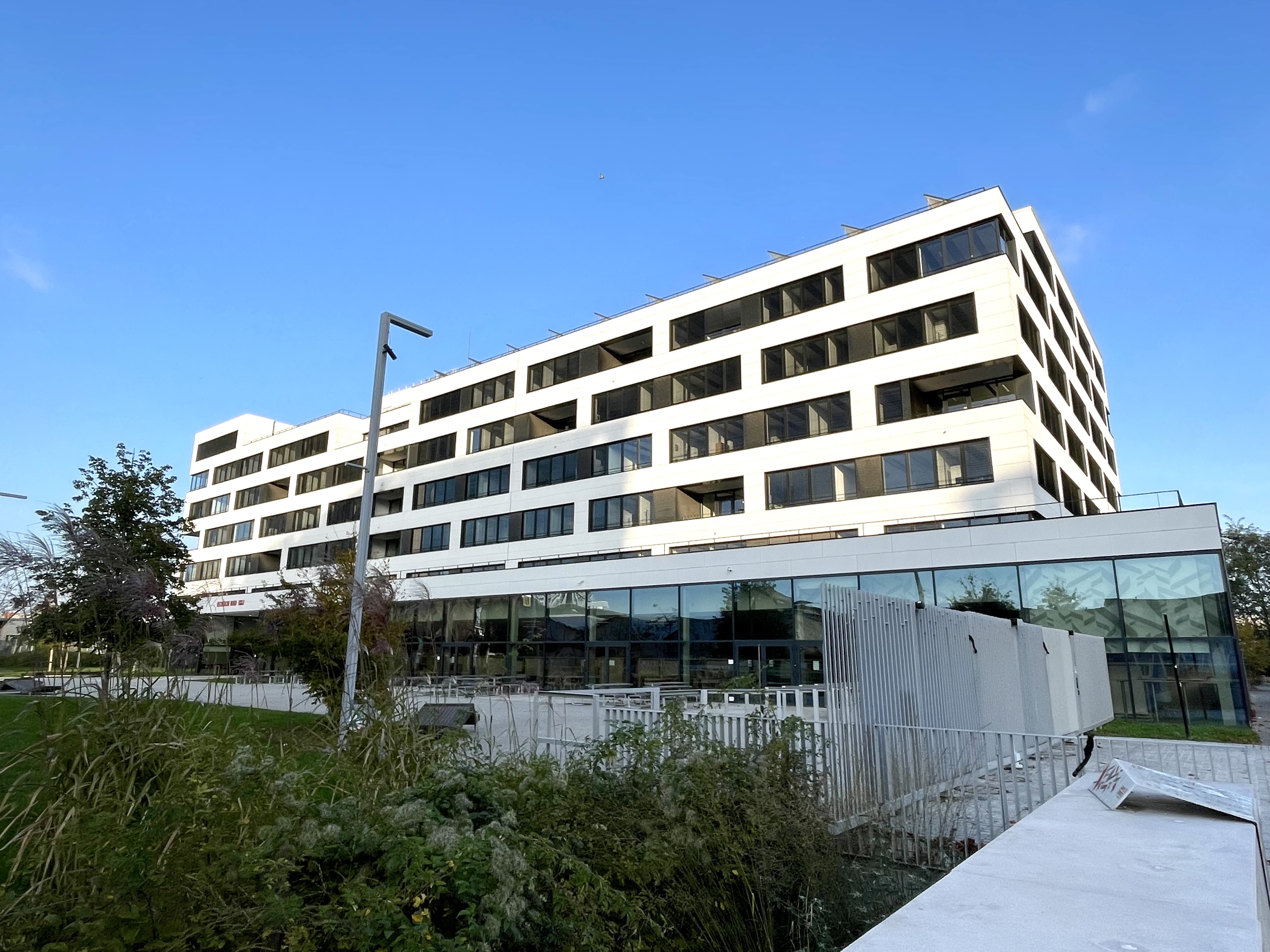
The Condorcet Campus North Research Building, shared with other universities.

In 2008, the university, along with seven other humanities and social sciences institutions, launched a campus project to the north of Paris, with the aim of bringing together on the same site a common research facility in the humanities and social sciences. In 2009, this became the Condorcet Campus, which opened in 2019.

In 2024, the university inaugurated the renovation of Building C, marking the first energy-efficient renovation of a university service building in France using the Energiesprong method. This initiative aims to make the building fully energy self-sufficient for all its uses, with a 20-year performance guarantee.

Following antisemitic remarks amounting to the glorification of terrorism during a meeting held at the university on 15 October 2025, an inspection mission was commissioned by the Minister of Higher Education.A commission made up of senior inspectors will ensure that Paris-VIII University properly implements its recommendations, announced the Minister of Higher Education during a visit to the institution in Saint-Denis on 27 March 2026.

== Academics ==
Paris 8 University (Université Paris 8 Vincennes–Saint-Denis) has historically occupied a distinctive position within French higher education, particularly in the fields of philosophy, cultural studies, film studies, psychoanalysis, and the arts. Founded in the aftermath of the May 1968 events as an experimental institution in Vincennes, the university was conceived as a laboratory for new pedagogical and intellectual practices, bringing together scholars associated with structuralism, post-structuralism, Marxism, psychoanalysis, and avant-garde artistic movements.

The institution became internationally known for its philosophy department, which included influential thinkers such as Gilles Deleuze, Jean-François Lyotard, Michel Foucault (associated), and Alain Badiou. Their presence contributed to establishing Paris 8 as a central site in the development of post-structuralist thought and contemporary continental philosophy. The university’s interdisciplinary orientation fostered sustained exchanges between philosophy, political theory, psychoanalysis, and aesthetic theory.

Paris 8 has also played a significant role in the institutionalization of film and media studies in France. Its film department has been particularly associated with theoretical approaches to cinema, including psychoanalytic film theory, apparatus theory, and philosophical approaches to the moving image. The intellectual environment of Paris 8 contributed to the broader international circulation of French film theory, influencing Anglophone film studies and visual culture scholarship from the 1970s onward.

More broadly, Paris 8 has maintained a reputation for experimental pedagogy, interdisciplinary curricula, and openness to emerging artistic and theoretical practices. This academic culture, often described as politically engaged and intellectually unconventional, continues to attract students and researchers interested in critical theory, contemporary art, media practices, and alternative forms of knowledge production.

== Affiliations ==
Paris-VIII is well-connected and has over 250 partnerships with universities around the world. They include the UC Berkeley, the Beijing Film Academy, Boston University, the Free University of Berlin, the Humboldt University of Berlin, the University of Vienna as well as since 2016 the University of Rojava.

Students are encouraged to spend one or two semesters at a neighbouring institution in the US, Canada, Latin America, Asia or Europe in order to develop their language skills and cultural understanding. Alternatively, students also have the possibility to teach French in a high school abroad or to complete an internship.

== Notable academics ==
Philosophy

- Gilles Deleuze
- François Chatelet
- Alain Badiou
- Daniel Bensaïd
- Alain Brossat
- Pierre Cassou-Noguès
- Michel Foucault
- Luce Irigaray
- Félix Guattari
- Sylvain Lazarus
- Jean-François Lyotard
- Antonio Negri
- Jacques Rancière
- René Schérer

Psychoanalysis

- Michel de Certeau
- Bruce Fink
- Jacques Lacan
- Serge Leclaire
- Jacques-Alain Miller
- François Regnault
- Éric Laurent
- Slavoj Žižek

Politics and international relations

- Gilbert Achcar
- Josué de Castro
- Jane Freedman
- Meir Masri

Economics

- Bernard Maris

Communication sciences

- Armand Mattelart

New media

- Pierre Lévy

Anthropology

- Alain Bertho

Sociology

- Michael Löwy
- Jean-Claude Passeron
- Nicos Poulantzas
- Henri Laborit (behavioral biology, systems thinking)

Arts

- Maurice Benayoun
- Jean-Louis Boissier
- Christine Brooke-Rose
- Christine Buci-Glucksmann
- Hélène Cixous
- Edmond Couchot
- Frank Popper

Music

- Daniel Charles
- Éveline Plicque-Andréani
- Costin Miereanu
- Daniel Caux

Ethnomusicology

- Giovanna Marini

Linguistics

- Martine Abdallah-Pretceille
- Nicolas Ruwet
- Maurice Gross
- Jean Dubois
- Richard S. Kayne

University presidents

- Joseph E. Aoun

== Notable alumni ==
- Elia, Crown Princess of Albania (born 1983)
- Clémentine Shakembo Kamanga (born 1952), Congolese diplomat and writer
- André Vanasse (1942–2026), Canadian writer

== See also ==
- University of Paris
- H2ptm: International conference on Hypertext and hypermedia, products, tools and methods
- Espace Francophone pour la Recherche, le Développement et l'Innovation
