= Global Center for Advanced Studies =

Educational and research institution in Dublin

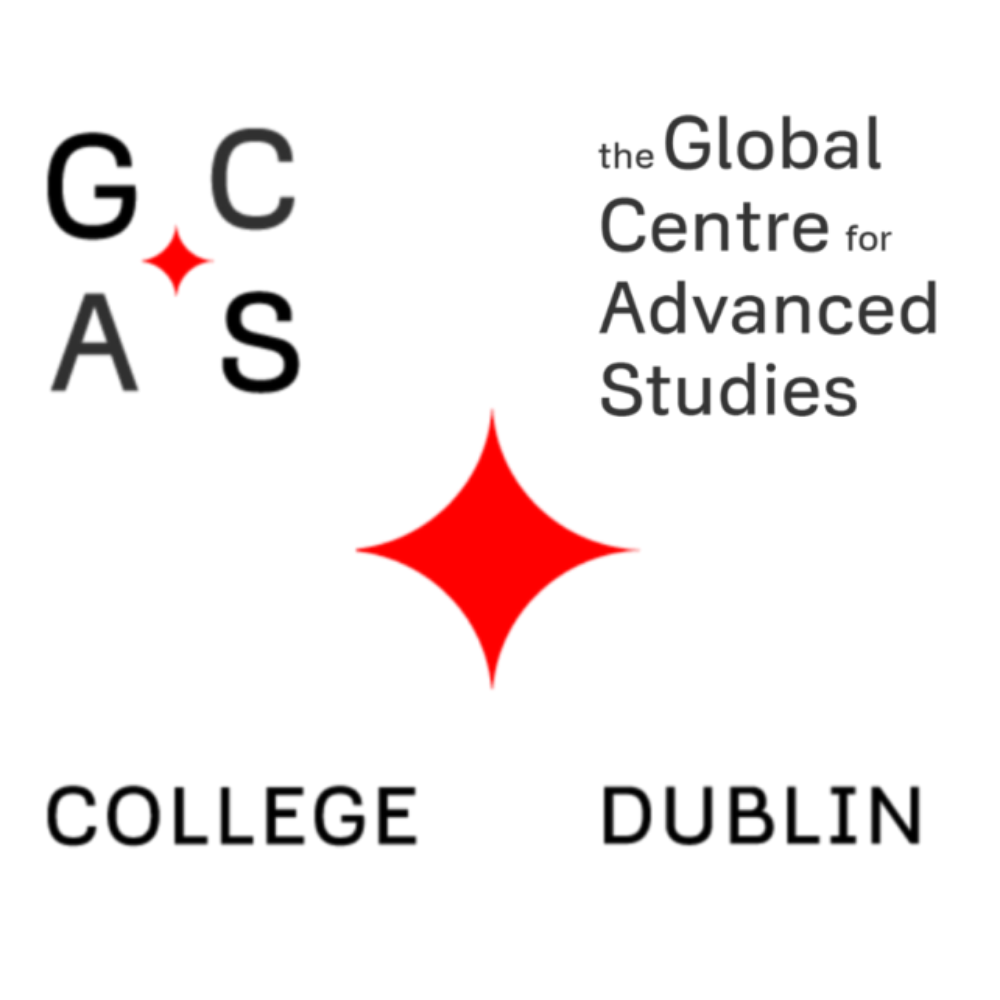
- Logo
- Established: August 22, 2013
- Location: Dublin, Ireland
- Website: https://gcas.ie/

The Global Center for Advanced Studies (GCAS /ˈdʒiːkɑːs/) is an educational and research institution located in Dublin, Ireland.

It hosts seminars with philosophers, journalists, artists, academics, and public figures. GCAS is governed by a board of directors.

In 2017, GCAS was incorporated in Ireland as a private limited company GCAS College Dublin Limited, creating a co-owned college among faculty, staff, financial supporters, and graduates.

== History ==
The Global Center for Advanced Studies was originally incorporated in the state of Colorado on August 22, 2013, by Creston C. Davis (currently Professor of Philosophy and Psychoanalysis and Chancellor at GCAS College Dublin), as an institute of higher learning based on critical theory, and on the concept of a "debt free education grounded in the principles of Democracy and the Commons.” Creston Davis hired Jason M. Adams on September 23, 2013, as a co-director, later Adams withdrew from GCAS.

The GCAS was subsequently relocated to Grand Rapids, Michigan and incorporated in Michigan on November 27, 2013, as a non-profit organization. The Colorado corporation was voluntarily dissolved on February 26, 2014. In 2017 Creston Davis and Tere Vaden, incorporated GCAS in Dublin, Ireland as GCAS Research Institute Ireland, and in 2018 as GCAS College Dublin, Limited.

From 2014–15, Alain Badiou assumed the role of Honorary President at GCAS. Azfar Hussain joined GCAS as its Honorary Vice-President in 2013 and is still working in that capacity. On July 16–19, 2015, a GCAS conference called "Democracy Rising World Conference 2015" took place in Athens. In autumn 2015, GCAS partnered with two institutions of higher education in Europe, the Alma Mater Europaea-European Center Maribor (AMEU-ECM) and the Institutum Studiorum Humanitatis (ISH). In 2017, Lewis Gordon, Professor of Philosophy at UCONN-Storrs, assumed the role of Honorary President at GCAS.

In 2017, the Global Center for Advanced Studies ended its academic partnership with Alma Mater Europaea-European Center Maribor and ISH owing to differences surrounding charging tuition and GCAS's model of debt-free education. The researchers, faculty, and staff of GCAS opted to found an independent research institute in Dublin, Ireland, renaming the institute GCAS-Research Institute, Ireland (GCAS-RII).

== Academics ==
GCAS provides EU-accredited degrees in partnership with Woolf University. The accredited degrees currently offered include: BA in Interdisciplinary Studies, MA Philosophy, MA Psychoanalysis, MA Theology, Master of Laws, PhD Humanities and Social Sciences, and. PhD Natural Sciences. All degrees can be completed online, with optional in-person seminars and graduation ceremony taking place once a year. The 2026 Spring Seminar Series is taking place in Florence, Italy, featuring seminars with Franco "Bifo" Berardi, Jamieson Webster, Clayton Crockett, Barry Taylor, Francisco González and Mario D’Amato.

=== Structure ===
The GCAS academic structure is divided into ten institutes: Critical Philosophy, Critical Media and Cultural Studies, Arts, Humanities and Social Sciences, Policy Studies, Critical Theology, Psychoanalysis, Global Studies, Political Economy and Critical Pedagogy; and a Forms and Formalization Research Group (FFRG) on Formal Ontology. The institute provides both online and in-residence courses that can be audited or taken towards earning a Bachelor of Arts, Master of Arts, and Doctor of Philosophy.

=== Core faculty ===
GCAS core faculty includes: Franco Berardi, Bracha L. Ettinger, Barry Taylor, Chris Hedges, Daniel Tutt, Filippo Scafi, Florian Kleinau, Helen Rollins, Francisco Gonzalez, Isabel Millar, Jamieson Webster, Julie Reshe, Kevin Boileau, Maxim Miroshnichenko.

=== Affiliations ===
In addition to the core faculty, the GCAS includes a roster of international Affiliate Professors that support the GCAS mission.

The organization affiliates itself with academic professors including Joan Copjec, Simon Critchley, Enrique Dussel, Arif Dirlik, Bracha L. Ettinger, Henry Giroux, Richard Kearney, Antonio Negri, Jean-Luc Nancy, Avital Ronell, Gayatri Spivak, and Gianni Vattimo, while past faculty members include Alain Badiou and Slavoj Žižek who remain as Affiliate Faculty.

Since its inception, GCAS held over 400 different meetings, classes, workshops and conferences, in which GCAS taught and engaged with over 100,000 people worldwide from more than 80 different countries. Events' locations range from The Centre Pompidou in Paris to Berlin, New York, Athens, Prague, Grand Rapids, and Cincinnati; engaging with live lectures from Oliver Stone, Gayatri Chakravorty Spivak, Alain Badiou, Farhang Erfani, Tariq Ali, Antonio Negri, Zoe Konstantopoulou, Jean-Luc Nancy, Bracha L. Ettinger, Eric Toussaint, Documenta's Adam Szymczyk, Azfar Hussain, Sigrid Hackenberg, Adrian Parr, Brad Evans, Clayton Crockett, John D. Caputo, Paul Mason, Leo Panitch, Jodi Dean, Bruno Bosteels, Francesca Coin, Giovanni Tusa, Lori Marso, Pete Rollins, Agata Bielik-Robson, William Desmond, Fragkiska Megaloudi, Jeffrey Robbins, Catherine Keller, Carl Reschke, George Katsiaficas, Shon Meckfessel, Graham Priest, Michael Hardt, Henry Giroux, Debt-Strike's Andrew Ross, Costas Lapavitsas, Astra Taylor, and via the Žižek Studies conference with forthcoming lectures by Noam Chomsky, Pulitzer Prize winner Chris Hedges, Lisa Duggan, and Richard D. Wolff, among others.

== Publications ==
=== GCAS Series ===
The GCAS Series is a collaboration between The GCAS Review Journal and independent publisher Incipit Zarathustra Editiociones.

==== Published titles ====
- The Future Belongs to Ghosts by John Caputo
- Philosophy After Truth: From Logos to The Secret by Filippo Scafi
- F*ck Education: Diagnoses and Hope for the Education System by Creston Davis, Alberto Pacheco Benites, Julie Reshe, and Helen Rollins
- How to Deindustrialize Our Artistic Practices by Eduardo Cruces

==== Forthcoming titles ====
- Non-Self Help by Julie Reshe
- Psychoanalysis and Eastern Philosophy: Buddhism by Mario D'Amato

=== The GCAS Review ===
The GCAS Review is a peer-reviewed academic journal of interdisciplinary studies and critical cultural engagement. The journal publishes peer-reviewed articles from a range of disciplines, including humanities, social and political sciences, philosophy, psychoanalysis, critical theory and the arts. The journal accepts contributions from academics, as well as public intellectuals, sustainability theorists, artists, coders, hackers, designers, and others.

== See also ==
- European Graduate School
