= Sam Gillespie =

French philosopher (1970-2003)

I am thinking of Sam Gillespie, who came from the United States to join my other friends in England, a particularly acute and occasionally mordant analyst (see The Mathematics of Novelty: Badiou’s Minimalist Metaphysics), whose intense work was interrupted by his death.

— Alain Badiou from Logics of Worlds

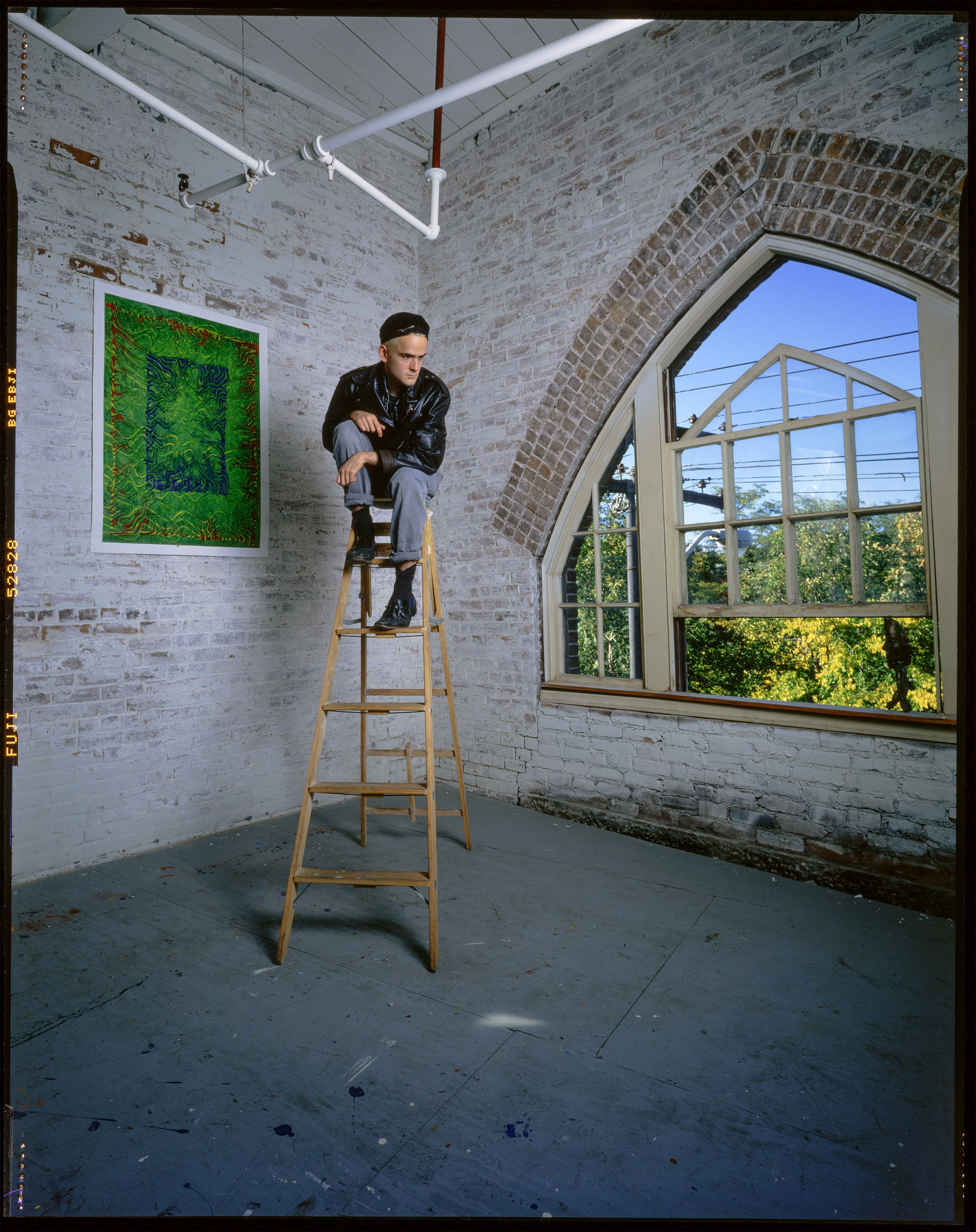
Portrait of Sam, c. 1989

Sam Gillespie (9 January 1970 – 8 August 2003) was a philosopher with a particular interest in the work of Alain Badiou, a French philosopher, formerly chair of Philosophy at the École Normale Supérieure (ENS) who wrote about being, truth and the subject in a way that, he claims, is neither postmodern nor simply a repetition of modernity. Gillespie was described by Joan Copjec as "one of the most gifted and promising philosophers of his generation".

He was a co-founder of the academic journal Umbr(a). Gillespie's book The Mathematics of Novelty was published posthumously in 2008. Peter Hallward wrote that "This tremendously valuable book is a landmark in the critical reception of Badiou’s work."

After his death by suicide at age 33, The Mathematics of Novelty was submitted for the degree of Doctor of Philosophy at the University of Warwick, which Gillespie was posthumously awarded in 2005. Into the first decade of the 21st century, it is now recognized that Gillespie's writings and translations were crucial to the initial reception of Alain Badiou's work in the English-speaking world.

== Selected bibliography ==
Books

- The Mathematics of Novelty: Badiou's Minimalist Metaphysics (Melbourne: re.press, 2008). For access to the complete version of this title in pdf format, visit the re.press website.

Journal publications

- ‘Slavoj Your Symptom!’, UMBR(a), no. 1, 1995, pp. 115–9.
- ‘Subtractive’, UMBR(a), no. 1, 1996, pp. 7–10, (available from CSeARCH).
- ‘Hegel Unsutured (an Addendum to Badiou)’, UMBR(a), no. 1, 1996, pp. 57–69 (available from CSeARCH).
- ‘Badiou’s Ethics: A Review’, Pli: The Warwick Journal of Philosophy, no. 12, 2001, pp. 256–65.
- ‘Neighborhood of Infinity: On Badiou’s Deleuze: The Clamor of Being’, UMBR(a), no. 1, 2001, pp. 91–106 (available from CSeARCH).
- ‘Placing the Void – Badiou on Spinoza’, Angelaki: Journal of the Theoretical Humanities, vol. 6, no. 3, 2001, pp. 63–77.
- ‘Beyond Being: Badiou’s Doctrine of Truth’, Communication and Cognition, vol. 36, no. 1-2, 2003, pp. 5–30 (available from CSeARCH).
- ‘Get Your Lack On’, UMBR(a), no. 1, 2004, pp. 9–19.
- 'Giving Form to Its Own Existence: Anxiety and the Subject of Truth', Cosmos and History: The Journal of Natural and Social Philosophy 1: The Praxis of Alain Badiou, 2006, pp. 161–18 (reprinted in The Praxis of Alain Badiou, ed. Paul Ashton, A.J. Bartlett and Justin Clemens (Melbourne: re.press, 2006, https://web.archive.org/web/20110411133810/http://www.re-press.org/content/view/21/38/)

Translations

- Badiou, Alain, "Hegel", trans. Marcus Coelen and Sam Gillespie, UMBR(a), no. 1, 1996, pp. 27–35.
- Badiou, Alain, "On a Contemporary Usage of Frege", trans. Justin Clemens and Sam Gillespie, UMBR(a), no. 1, 2000, pp. 99–115.
