= Daniel Colson =

French sociologist and academic (1943–2026)

- Born: 1943; Aubusson, German-occupied France
- Died: 9 January 2026 (aged 82)
- Education: University of Lyon
- Occupations: Sociologist; Academic

Daniel Colson (French: [danjɛl kɔlsɔ̃]; 1943 – 9 January 2026) was a French sociologist and academic.

After discovering Marxism and anarchism while a student at the University of Lyon, Colson led the Lyon chapter of the Comité Vietnam national and witnessed the events of May 68. He defended his doctoral thesis in 1983 and became a sociology professor at Jean Monnet University. In March 2016, he notably signed an open letter alongside Pierre Alféri, Jérôme Baschet, Serge Quadruppani, and Éric Hazan calling for labor reform.

Colson died on 9 January 2026, at the age of 82.

== Publications ==
- Anarcho-Syndicalisme et Communisme. Saint-Étienne 1920-1925 (1986)
- La compagnie des fonderies forges et aciéries de Saint-Étienne (1865-1914) , autonomie et subjectivité techniques (1998)
- Petit lexique philosophique de l'anarchisme de Proudhon à Deleuze (2001)
- Trois essais de philosophie anarchiste : Islam, histoire, monadologie (2004)
- L'Anarchisme de Malatesta (2010)
- Proudhon et l'anarchie (2017)
- La Gryffe - La longue histoire d’une librairie libertaire (2020)
