= Bertho =

Bertho is a surname. Notable people with the surname include:

== Surname ==
- Alain Bertho (fl. 1991–2009), French anthropologist and academic
- Jean Berthollier (1928–2023), French actor and film director known by the stage name Jean Bertho

== See also ==
- Bertho Driever (born 1953), Dutch baroque musician and recorder player
