= Azfar Hussain =

Bangladeshi-American academic and public intellectual

- আজফার হোসেন
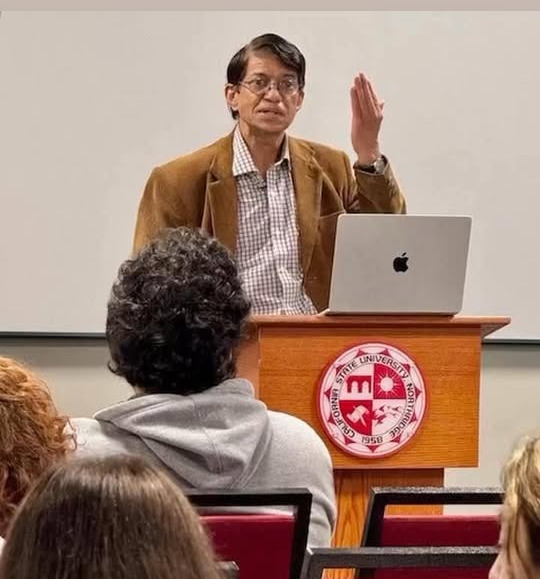
- Azfar Hussain giving a lecture at California State University, Northridge in 2025
- Pronunciation: Bengali pronunciation: [azɸaɾ ɦosɛn]
- Born: Bangladesh
- Education: Washington State University (MA, PhD) University of Dhaka (BA, MA)
- Occupations: Writer, scholar, teacher
- Website: www.azfarhussain.net

Azfar Hussain (Note: Bengali: আজফার হোসেন, Bengali pronunciation: [azɸaɾ ɦosɛn].) (Bengali: আজফার হোসেন, pronounced [azɸaɾ ɦosɛn]) is a Bangladeshi-American theorist, critic, poet, translator, and public intellectual who writes in both Bengali and English. He is an associate professor of Interdisciplinary Studies at Grand Valley State University in Michigan, where he has also served as the director of the Graduate Program in Social Innovation, and is vice-president of the Global Center for Advanced Studies (GCAS) and honorary GCAS Professor of English, World Literature, and Interdisciplinary Studies. He is also the Summer Distinguished Professor of English and Humanities at the University of Liberal Arts Bangladesh (ULAB).

Hussain has published, in both English and Bengali, hundreds of academic, popular, and creative pieces, including translations from non-western languages, and written on a wide range of topics from Native American poetics and politics to critiques of postmodern-poststructuralist-postcolonial theory to Marxist political economy to "third-world" literatures to globalization and imperialism to theories and practices of interdisciplinarity. He translated into Bengali the stories of Gabriel García Márquez and the poems of Stéphane Mallarmé, Vicente Aleixandre, and Roque Dalton, among others. He also translated into English the lyrics of Kabir and the poems of Faiz Ahmad Faiz. A Daily Star review of Hussain's Bengali book Dorshonakkhyan (Philosophical Narratives, 2019) desribed it as "one of the finest specimens of philosophical thought in Bangla language."

Hussain is also an internationally known public speaker and a frequent subject of media interviews regarding Bangladeshi society, culture, and politics.

== Education and career ==
Azfar Hussain received his BA (Honors) and MA degrees in English from the University of Dhaka. He obtained his second MA in English under a Fulbright fellowship and his doctorate in English and World Literature, both with distinction, from Washington State University. He also worked as Postdoctoral Blackburn Fellow in the Department of English at Washington State University prior to joining in 2004 the university's faculty of the Department of Comparative Ethnic Studies, later renamed Critical Culture, Gender, and Race Studies.

He taught English, world literature, ethnic studies, and cultural studies at Washington State University, Bowling Green State University, and Oklahoma State University; while, in Bangladesh, he taught English at Jahangirnagar University and North South University. He also worked as Scholar-in-Residence and Summer Distinguished Professor of English and Humanities at the University of Liberal Arts Bangladesh. He is an advisory editor of Rhizomes: Cultural Studies in Emerging Knowledge. He is also an editorial board member of the Bengali journals Natun Diganta and Sarbajonakotha.

In 2013 Hussain joined as vice-president the Global Center for Advanced Studies, whose Honorary President was Alain Badiou in 2014–15, and has been working in that position since then.

During his stay in Bangladesh in the early-to-mid 1990s, Hussain served as Acting General Secretary of Bangladesh Lekhak Shibir, a national organization of progressive writers, artists, and activists, where he worked with Hasan Azizul Huq who was then President of the organization, and with Akhteruzzaman Elias who was then its vice president, in addition to working with Badruddin Umar, one of the founding members of the organization, and with Anu Muhammad, who was then on the executive committee of the organization. Hussain co-edited, with Serajul Islam Choudhury, a Bengali national viewsweekly called Somoy and worked as a contributing editor of the national newsweekly Sunday Express. He also contributed numerous columns on political, social, and cultural issues to newspapers and periodicals in both Bengali and English.

== Works and views ==
"Speak" by Faiz Ahmad Faiz in Azfar Hussain's translation

Speak, your lips are free.
Speak, it is your own tongue.
Speak, it is your own body.
Speak, your life is still yours.

See how in the blacksmith's shop
The flame burns wild, the iron glows red;
The locks open their jaws,
And every chain begins to break.

Speak, this brief hour is long enough
Before the death of body and tongue:
Speak, 'cause the truth is not dead yet,
Speak, speak, whatever you must speak.

Influenced by the works of Karl Marx, V.I. Lenin, Antonio Gramsci, and Frantz Fanon, Azfar Hussain in his interdisciplinary work examines how such global systems as capitalism, imperialism/colonialism, racism, and patriarchy work in their interconnections, and how they affect the practice of everyday life both locally and globally, both economically and culturally, and he focuses on the ideas of revolutionary politics and radical social transformation. He also offers a theory of struggle based on his formulation that the struggle for human emancipation involves four crucial sites of both oppression and opposition: land, labor, language, and the body. These four categories also serve as conceptual, analytic, and hermeneutic tools in Hussain's work of literary and cultural criticism. As for his work in the area of comparative literature, Hussain examines the Eurocentrism that, according to him, still characterizes much of the field, while he emphasizes the need for decolonizing the field by ranging beyond, if not rejecting, the canonical Anglo-American and European traditions and thus by comparing, i.e., by exploring significant connections and similarities among, ignored and marginalized anti-colonial literary works from Asia, Africa, and Latin America.

== Personal life ==
Azfar Hussain divides his time between Bangladesh and the US. He currently lives in Allendale, Michigan. He was married in 2002, and has a daughter, Salma Hussain.

== Selected publications ==
=== Books in Bengali ===
- Chinho Bhashe Obosheshe (Signs Float in the End, 2023)
- Path: Shabda o Noishabder Rajniti (Interpretation: The Politics of Sound and Silence, 2022)
- Dorshonakkhyan (Philosophical Narratives, 2019)

=== Books in English ===
- Chromatones: A collection of poems in English (1980)
- The Wor(l)d in Question: Essays in Political Economy and Cultural Politics (2008)
- The Phalgun Phenomenon (Translations of Bengali poems) (2008)
- Reading About the World, Volume 1 (Co-editor) (1999)
- Reading About the World, Volume 2 (Co-editor) (1999)

=== Selected papers and chapters ===
- "Reading Nazrul's 'Vidrohi': The Politics of Its Language." In Nazrul: An Evaluation, ed. Mohammad Nurul Huda. Dhaka: Nazrul Institute, 1997, 287–296.
- "Joy Harjo and Her Poetics as Praxis: A 'Postcolonial' Political Economy of the Body, Land, Labor, and Language." Wicazo Sa Review 15, no. 2 (2000): 27–61.
- “Dirty Dialectics and Onions: Theory and Practice against Late Monopoly Capital.” Panini: NSU Studies in Language & Literature 2 (2004): 73-136.
- "Amílcar Cabral." In A Historical Companion to Postcolonial Literatures in English, ed. Prem Poddar and David Johnson. Edinburgh: Edinburgh University Press, 2005.
- “Towards a Political Economy of Racism and Colonialism: Re-reading Frantz Fanon’s The Wretched of the Earth.” In Race and the Foundations of Knowledge: Cultural Amnesia in the Academy. Illinois: University of Illinois Press,2006.127-144.
- "Regimes of Visual Colonialism: Rereading National Geographic." Panini: NSU Studies in Language & Literature 4 (2007): 15–55.
