= Natacha Michel =

French political activist, militant and writer

Natacha Michel (born 1941) is a French political activist, militant and writer. She has published a dozen novels and a growing body of literary criticism.

Michel was program director at the College International de Philosophie (1995–2001). She is the daughter of French film director and screenwriter André Michel.

== L'Organisation Politique ==
Following the student uprisings of May 1968 in France, Michel was a founding member of the Union des communistes de France marxiste-léniniste (UCFml). To quote Alain Badiou, the UCFml is "the Maoist organization established in late 1969 by Natacha Michel, Sylvain Lazarus, myself and a fair number of young people". Michel's commitment to political intervention did not waver in the following decades. She is a founding member (along with Badiou and Lazarus) of the militant French political organisation Organisation politique which called itself a post-party organization concerned with direct popular intervention in a wide range of issues (including immigration, labor, and housing). In addition to numerous writings and interventions since the 1980s, L'Organisation Politique has stressed the importance of developing political prescriptions concerning undocumented migrants (in France referred to as les sans papiers) and stresses that they must be conceived primarily as workers and not immigrants.

== Selected publications ==
- Ici commence, (Here begins), Gallimard, 1973.
- La Chine européenne, (The China European) Gallimard, 1975.
- Le repos de Penthésilée, (The rest of Penthesilea), Gallimard, 1980.
- Impostures et séparations: 9 courts romans, (Impostures and separations, 9 short novels), Le Seuil, 1986.
- (with Sylvain Lazarus) "Étude sur les formes de conscience et les représentations des OS des usines Renault". Rapport de recherche. Paris, CNRS, Régie nationale des usines Renault, 1986.
- Canapé Est-Ouest, (Couch East-West), Le Seuil, 1989.
- Le jour où le temps a attendu son heure, (The day the time has waited his time), Le Seuil, 1990.
- Ciel éteint, (Ciel off), Le Seuil, 1995.
- L'éducation de la poussière, (The education of dust), Le Seuil, 1998.
- Autobiographie. Autobiography. Approche de l'ombre, Déploration à quatre voix, (Approaching the shadows, Déploration four votes), Verdier, 2001.
- Laissez tomber l'infini, il revient par la fenêtre, (Forget the infinite, it is out of the window), Le Seuil, 2003.
- Circulaire à toute vie humaine, (Circular to all human life), Le Seuil, 2004.
