= Julie Reshe =

Ukrainian philosopher

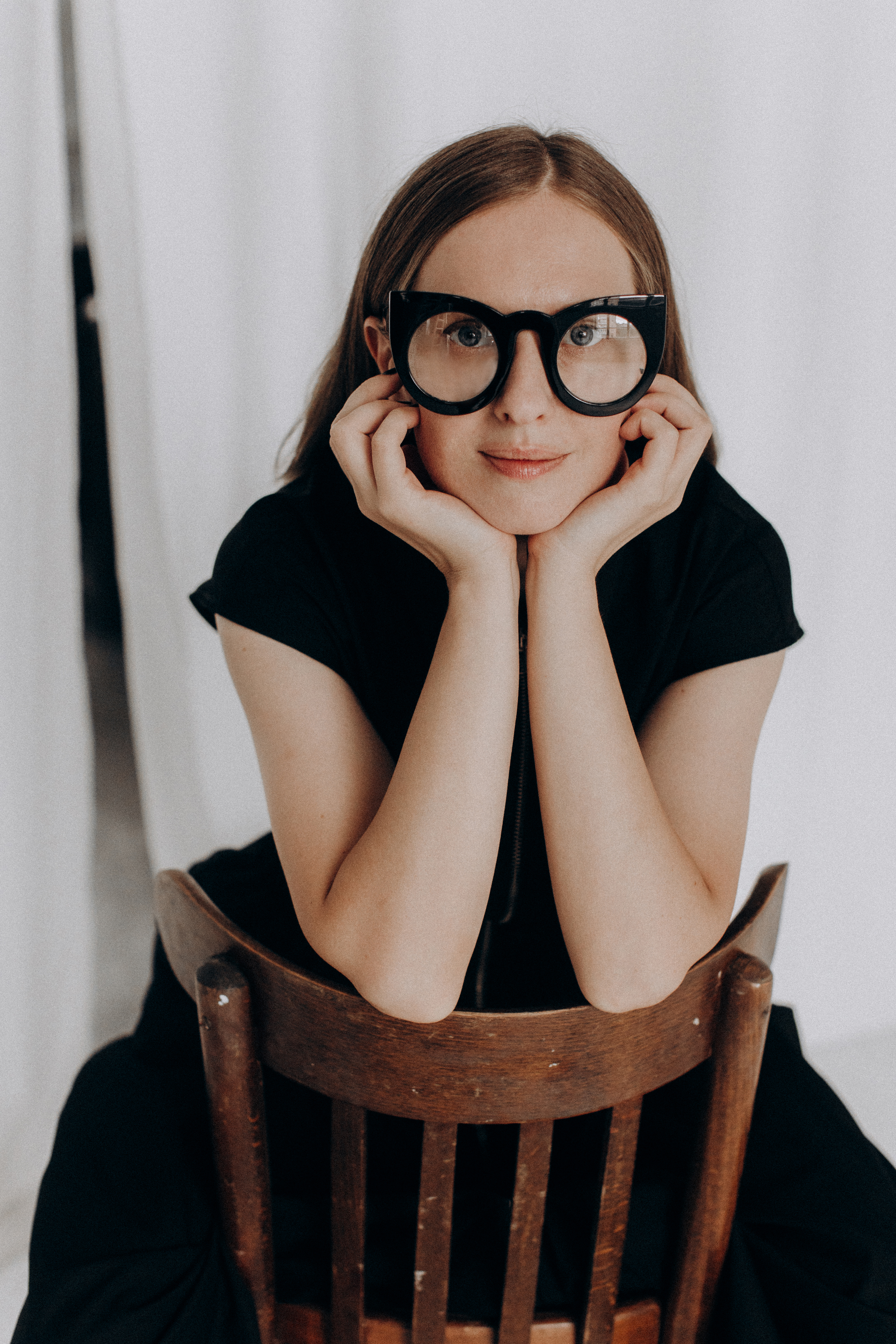

Education
- Education: Slovenian Academy of Sciences and Arts (PhD)
- Doctoral advisor: Alenka Zupančič

Philosophical work
- Era: Contemporary philosophy
- Region: Western philosophy
- School: Continental philosophy
- Institutions: Global Centre for Advanced Studies, University College Cork, University College Dublin
- Main interests: Psychoanalysis, continental philosophy, philosophy of death, philosophical pessimism
- Notable ideas: Negative psychoanalysis, negative practice, feminist depressive realism

Julie Reshe is a Ukrainian-born philosopher, writer, and psychoanalyst known for developing negative psychoanalysis and the broader framework of negative practice. She is a visiting professor at University College Cork and University College Dublin and director of the Institute of Psychoanalysis at the Global Centre for Advanced Studies.

== Philosophy ==
Julie Reshe’s work centres on negative psychoanalysis, which she develops as both a theoretical and practical approach. Bringing psychoanalysis into dialogue with philosophical pessimism and depressive realism, she examines death, negativity, suffering, and tragedy as structural dimensions of psychic life, society, and existence itself. Rather than promising cure or consolation, negative psychoanalysis emphasizes forms of relation that emerge through the recognition of suffering as shared and irreducible.

Her central ideas include:

- Negative psychoanalysis: an approach that questions the opposition between the “healthy” practitioner and the “sick” patient, treating negativity and suffering as shared conditions rather than deviations from an ideal state of psychological health.
- Negative practice: a broader philosophical and practical framework that moves beyond psychoanalysis and therapy. Unlike self-help and therapeutic models aimed at healing, it creates spaces in which suffering and negativity can be encountered without orienting them toward recovery or redemption.
- Depressive realism: the proposition that depressive perception may disclose aspects of existence that are obscured by compulsory optimism and conventional ideals of happiness. Reshe examines the philosophical and critical significance of depressive experience without idealizing it as a desirable condition.
- Feminist depressive realism: Reshe reformulates philosophical pessimism and depressive realism from the perspective of women’s embodied experience. She argues that these traditions have tended to universalise male suffering; her account takes female and maternal embodiment as central sites for understanding pain, negativity, and the tragic dimension of existence.
- The death drive: drawing particularly on Sabina Spielrein, Reshe treats destruction and becoming as inseparable processes. She extends the death drive beyond the individual psyche, treating negativity as constitutive of social reality and existence more broadly.
- Destructive plasticity: developing Catherine Malabou’s concept, Reshe examines irreversible transformations in which trauma, loss, or destruction shatters an existing identity or psychic structure and gives rise to an altered form.
- Trauma as initiation: Reshe conceptualizes trauma as an initiation into an altered form of existence, characterized by heightened contact with the destructive and tragic dimensions of reality. Her account challenges therapeutic interpretations centred on damage, maladaptation, and excessively negative perception.
- Death and love: Reshe examines love as emerging within mortality and suffering through loss and the recognition of shared finitude.

Reshe’s work has been discussed in relation to philosophical pessimism, feminist critiques of positivity, contemporary psychoanalytic theory, and critical approaches to education.

== Books ==
- Negative Psychoanalysis for the Living Dead: Philosophical Pessimism and the Death Drive, Springer International Publishing 2023
- Death and Love: Psychoanalytic and Philosophical Perspectives, edited with Todd McGowan, Routledge 2025
- Negative Essays: On Death, Love, and Depressive Realism, Negative Press, 2026
