= Sylvain Lazarus =

French sociologist, anthropologist and political theorist (born 1943)

Sylvain Lazarus (born 1943) is a French sociologist, anthropologist and political theorist. He is known for his contributions to French Marxist and Maoist politics, particularly with philosopher Alain Badiou, his book The Anthropology of the Name, and the study of banlieues. He has also written under the pseudonym Paul Sandevince. Lazarus was a professor at the Paris 8 University.

== Life and work ==
Lazarus was born in 1943.

Lazarus worked out a theory of the social function of political categorizations (cf. Anthropology of the Name, 1996), exploring in the anthropological field what his Lacanian colleagues Alain Badiou (Being and Event, 1988) and Jean-Claude Milner (The Indistinct Names, 1983) worked out in the fields of philosophy (Badiou) and of linguistics and of psychoanalytic theory (Milner).

Lazarus's 1996 book 'Anthropologie du nom' (Anthropology of the Name) was translated into English by Gila Walker for publication in 2015. Previously, it was discussed at length by Alain Badiou in his Abrégé de Métapolitique (1998), which was translated into English as Metapolitics (2005).

=== L'Organisation Politique ===
Following the student uprisings of May 1968 in France, Lazarus was a founding member of the Union des communistes de France marxiste-léniniste (UCFml). Badiou, another founding member, said that the UCFml was "the Maoist organization established in late 1969 by Natacha Michel, Sylvain Lazarus, myself and a fair number of young people".

Fifteen years later, in 1984, Lazarus was a founding member (along with Badiou and Michel) of the militant French political organisation Organisation politique which called itself a post-party organization concerned with direct popular intervention in a wide range of issues including immigration, labor, and housing. It published a journal, La Distance politique, for several years. In addition to writings and interventions since the 1980s, L'Organisation Politique stressed the importance of developing political prescriptions concerning undocumented migrants (in France referred to as les sans papiers) and stressed that they must be conceived primarily as workers and not immigrants.

=== International Observatory on Suburbs and Outskirts ===
Beginning in the 1990s, Lazarus focused much of his activism on the French suburbs (the banlieues). In 2008, with fellow French anthropologist Alain Bertho, he founded l'Observatoire international des banlieues et des périphéries (OIBP), which has produced studies in France, Brazil and Senegal.

== Bibliography ==
- Author:
  - (French) 'Althusser, la politique et l’histoire'. In S. Lazarus (ed.) Politique et philosophie dans l’oeuvre de Louis Althusser. Paris: Presses Universitaires de France, 1993.
  - (French) Anthropologie du nom. Paris: Seuil, 1996.
    - (English translation) Anthropology of the Name. Translated by Gila Walker. Seagull Books, 2015. ISBN 978-0-85742230-9
  - (French) "Anthropologie ouvrière et enquêtes d’usine; état des lieux et problématique". In Revue Ethnologie Française, numéro 3, 2001.
  - (French) Introduction to Ethnologie française n°III/2001 consacré à l'anthropologie ouvrière
  - (French) Desir de Revolution. In Lignes n°04 : (février 2002)
  - (English) "Lenin and the Party, 1902 – November 1917". In Lenin Reloaded: Toward a Politics of Truth, edited by Sebastian Budgen, Stathis Kouvelakis, and Slavoj Žižek. Durham: Duke University Press, 2007. ISBN 978-0-8223-3929-8 doi:10.2307/jj.33610712.16
- Co-author, editor:
  - (French) L'art dégénéré – Actes d'une exposition, Aix-en-Provence, juin 1998: Jean-Paul Curnier, Sylvain Lazarus, Jean-Pierre Faye, Alain Badiou – Editeur: Al Dante (Editions) (1998)
  - (French) Politique et philosophie dans l'oeuvre de Louis Althusser – Pratiques théoriques éditeur : Presses Universitaires France (1993)
- Conference Director:
  - Chercher ailleurs et autrement. Sur la doctrine des lieux, l’économie, l’effondrement du socialisme Conférence du Perroquet – 1992

=== Using the pseudonym Paul Sandevince ===
- all articles in French:
  - various articles in the Maoist journal of the Union des communistes de France marxiste-léniniste.
  - Qu'est-ce qu'une Politique Marxiste. Éditions Potemkine – January 1978.
  - Notes de travail sur le post-léninisme. Éditions Potemkine – 1981.
