= The Century (book) =

Book by Alain Badiou

- First edition (French)
- Author: Alain Badiou
- Original title: Le Siècle
- Translator: Alberto Toscano
- Publisher: Éditions du Seuil
- Publication date: 2005
- Media type: Print
- Pages: 233
- ISBN: 0-7456-3632-2
- OCLC: 71239009
- LC Class: CB425 .B2413 2007

The Century is a book about politics, philosophy and literature by Alain Badiou, first published in French by Éditions du Seuil in 2005; the English translation by Alberto Toscano was published by Polity Press in 2007. The thirteen chapters of the book are presented as lessons derived from a seminar Badiou gave at the College International de Philosophie between 1998-2001. Badiou's analysis of the 20th century is drawn from his unique encounter with 20th century poetry and theater, literary theory, totalitarianism, and the search for meaningful narratives that are neither logical nor dialectical. He warns against "animal humanism" and advocates "formalized inhumanism".

== The search for a method ==
Badiou conceives of the century as a duration and concentrates upon the "short century" of 75 years, beginning with the wars of 1914-18 (including the Russian Revolution of 1917) and closing with the collapse of the USSR and the end of the Cold War.

Badiou agrees with André Malraux's observation that politics has turned into tragedy in the 20th century and adds that "the century was haunted by the idea of creating a new man." He suggests the political project enacting that tragedy is driven by profit motives, as well as "criminals as anonymous as joint-stock companies."

== The beast ==
Badiou considers the century as conceived in Osip Mandelstam's poem The Age (1923) which depicts the wounded body of a beast. The degree to which the century can be considered as living recalls the vitalism of Henri Bergson, and Badiou contrasts it to Friedrich Nietzsche's concept of the will to power and the Übermensch. Badiou also compares 19th century's submission to the movement of Hegelian history with the 20th century's effort to confront history face to face. This kind of voluntarism has been marred by horrendous experiences of war. Badiou suggests that such butchery has instilled doubt and nostalgia for historical moments of the past and states that the 20th century sought to fulfill the promises of the 19th century, including Marx's concept of revolution. In Lacanian terms, Badiou indicates that the experience of The Real is always in part the experience of horror.

== See also ==
- Epistemology
- Western canon
- Literary theory

== Bibliography ==
- Badiou, Alain, 2007. The Century: Polity Press. ISBN 0-7456-3632-2.
