= H2ptm =

International conference

H^{2}PTM, or Hypertext Hypermedia Products Tools and Methods, is an international conference on hypermedia. The first congress was held in Paris in 1989 and was organized by the Paragraphe Lab at the University of Paris VIII.

In 2009, H^{2}PTM celebrated its 20th anniversary with a conference held in Paris in November.
