= Justin Clemens =

Australian academic

Justin Clemens FAHA (born 22 April 1969) is an Australian academic known for his work on Alain Badiou, psychoanalysis, European philosophy, and contemporary Australian art and literature. He is also a published poet.

== Biography ==
Clemens studied at the University of Melbourne, gaining his PhD on "Institution, aesthetics, nihilism: the Romanticism of contemporary theory" in 1999.

He then lectured in Psychoanalytic Studies at Deakin University, before moving to the School of Culture and Communication at the University of Melbourne in the late 2000s where he is Senior Lecturer.

Clemens is art critic for the Australian magazine The Monthly. He has a daughter.

== Scholarly contributions ==
In his extensive published work, he writes on psychoanalysis, contemporary European philosophy, and literature. Clemens has also published poetry and prose fiction.

He was elected a Fellow of the Australian Academy of the Humanities in 2023.

== Selected bibliography ==
Translated books and articles

- Badiou, Alain, "On a Contemporary Usage of Frege", trans. Justin Clemens and Sam Gillespie, UMBR(a), no. 1, 2000, pp. 99–115.
- Infinite Thought: Truth and the Return to Philosophy. Translated and edited by Justin Clemens & Oliver Feltham, (London: Continuum, 2003): ISBN 978-0-8264-7929-7 (paperback); ISBN 978-0-8264-6724-9 (hardcover)

Creative works

- (poetry) The Mundiad. (Melbourne: Black, Inc. Publishing, 2004) ISBN 1-86395-173-3
- (novella) Black River. With collages by Helen Johnson, (Melbourne: re.press, 2007) ISBN 978-0-9803052-2-7
- (poetry) Villain. (Melbourne: Hunter Contemporary Australian Poets, 2009)
- (illustrated short story) "Justine & Jacquie and their adventures on the other side (an excerpt)" with Jason Barker in Meanjin Winter 2023 (Melbourne University Press).

Authored books

- The Romanticism of Contemporary Theory: Institutions, Aesthetics, Nihilism. (Aldershot: Ashgate Publishing, 2003)
- Avoiding the Subject: Media, Culture and the Object. (Amsterdam: Amsterdam University Press, 2004)
- Psychoanalysis is an Antiphilosophy (Edinburgh: Edinburgh University Press, forthcoming May 2013)

Co-authored books

- Lacan, Deleuze, Badiou. A.J. Bartlett, Justin Clemens, Jon Roffe, (Edinburgh University Press, 2014)

Edited collections and books

- Jaques Lacan and the Other Side of Psychoanalysis: Reflections on Seminar XVII. Clemens & R. Grigg (eds.), (Durham: Duke University Press, 2006).
- The Praxis of Alain Badiou. Paul Ashton, A. J. Bartlett, Justin Clemens (eds.), (Melbourne: re.press, 2006).
- The Work of Giorgio Agamben: Law, Literature, Life. Edited with Nicholas Heron and Alex Murray. (Edinburgh: Edinburgh University Press, hardback: 2008; paperback: 2011).
- Badiou: Key Concepts. Bartlett & Clemens (eds.), (London: Acumen, 2010). Contributions from various Badiou scholars and translators including, along with Clemens and Bartlett, Bruno Bosteels, Ray Brassier, Oliver Feltham, Z.L. Fraser, Sigi Jottkandt, Nina Power, and Alberto Toscano
- The Jacqueline Rose Reader. Edited by Clemens & Ben Naparstek (Durham, NC: Duke University Press, 2011)
