= Oliver Feltham =

Australian philosopher

Oliver Feltham is an Australian philosopher and translator working in Paris, France. He is known primarily for his English translations of Alain Badiou, most notably Badiou’s magnum opus Being and Event (2006). Feltham's own writings are drawn from many of his research interests including Marxism, critical theory, and the history of metaphysics. His recent work has also focused on psychoanalysis and Jacques Lacan.

Feltham received his B.A. at the University of Sydney. In 2000, he completed his doctoral thesis at Deakin University in Melbourne, writing his dissertation on the ontological distinction between praxis and work in ancient and modern philosophy (with a focus on Badiou and Michel Foucault) based on research Feltham conducted in Paris.

Feltham teaches at the American University of Paris (AUP) where he has been since 2004 and where he became a full-time associate professor in 2006, teaching in the comparative literature and "Global Communications" departments and in the Philosophy Program. Feltham is also a researcher at the Circle for Lacanian Ideology Critique at the Jan van Eyck Academie in Maastricht.

== Selected bibliography ==
Translated books and articles

- Alain Badiou:
  - Infinite Thought: Truth and the Return to Philosophy, transl. and ed. by Feltham & Justin Clemens; (London: Continuum, 2003): ISBN 978-0-8264-7929-7 (paperback); ISBN 978-0-8264-6724-9 (hardcover)
  - Being and Event, London: Continuum, 2006.
- Jean-Claude Milner, "The Doctrine on Science", Umbr(a)L Science and Truth Issue (Buffalo: 2000).

Authored books

- As Fire Burns: Of Ontology, Praxis, and Functional Work, Geelong, Deakin University PhD Thesis, 2000.
- (ed. with Bruno Besana), Écrits autour de la pensée d'Alain Badiou, Paris, Éditions L'Harmattan, 2007.
- Alain Badiou: Live Theory, London: Continuum, 2008. ISBN 978-0-8264-9693-5.
- Anatomy of Failure: Philosophy and Political Action, London, Bloomsbury, 2013.
