= Bruno Bosteels =

Belgian academic

Bruno Bosteels (Dutch: [ˈbɔsteːls]; born 1967, Leuven, Belgium) has served as a professor of Spanish and Comparative Literature at Columbia University. As of 2024, Bosteels was Acting Dean of Humanities and Professor of the Department of Latin American and Iberian Cultures at Columbia University. He served until 2010 as the General Editor of diacritics.

Bosteels is well known to the English-speaking world for his work on Latin American literature and culture and his translations of the work of Alain Badiou (a well-known French philosopher). One of Badiou’s key early philosophical texts, Theory of the Subject, appeared in 2009. This was Bosteels’s English translation of Théorie du sujet (originally published in France in 1982). Since then, Bosteels has translated at least seven more books by Badiou.

Bosteels has research interests spanning contemporary philosophy, literary criticism, political and critical theory. He was awarded a 2024 Guggenheim Fellowship, recognized for his literary criticism.

== Selected bibliography ==
Original works

- (in Spanish) Badiou o el recomienzo del materialismo dialéctico (Santiago de Chile: Palinodia, 2007)
- (in French) Alain Badiou, une trajectoire polémique (Editions La Fabrique, 2009) ISBN 978-2-35872-000-7
- The Actuality of Communism (New York & London: Verso Books, 2011) ISBN 978-1-84467-695-8 (hardcover)
- Badiou and Politics (Durham & London: Duke University Press, 2011) ISBN 978-0-8223-5076-7 (paperback)
- Marx and Freud in Latin America: Politics, Psychoanalysis, and Religion in Times of Terror (New York & London: Verso Books, 2012) ISBN 978-1-84467-755-9
- (in Spanish) La Comuna mexicana (Ciudad de México: Ediciones Akal, 2021) ISBN 978-607-8683-71-0

Translations of books

- Alain Badiou. Theory of the Subject, (New York: Continuum, 2009): ISBN 978-0-8264-9673-7 (hardcover)
- Alain Badiou. Wittgenstein's Anti-Philosophy (New York & London: Verso, 2011) ISBN 978-1-84467-694-1 (hardcover)

Essays

- "Post-Maoism: Badiou and Politics." Alain Badiou and Cultural Revolution. Special issue of positions: east asia culture critique 13.3 (2005): pp. 576–634
- "Alain Badiou's Theory of the Subject: The Recommencement of Dialectical Materialism." Lacan: His Silent Partners. Ed. Slavoj Žižek (London: Verso, 2006)
- "Hegel in America." Religion, Politics, and the Dialectic: Hegel and the Opening of the Infinite. Ed. Clayton Crockett, Creston Davis, and Slavoj Žižek. (New York: Columbia University Press, 2009)
- "Rancière's Leftism, or, Politics and Its Discontents." Jacques Rancière: Politics, History, Aesthetics. Ed. Phil Watts and Gabriel Rockhill. (Durham & London: Duke University Press, 2009).
- "Badiou and Hegel." Badiou: Key Concepts. Ed. Justin Clemens and A. J. Barlett. (London: Acumen, 2010).
- "The Leftist Hypothesis: Communism in the Age of Terror." The Idea of Communism. Ed. Costas Douzinas and Slavoj Žižek. (New York: Verso, 2010).

Interviews

- "Can Change Be Thought? A Dialogue with Alain Badiou." Alain Badiou: Philosophy And Its Conditions. Ed. Gabriel Riera (Albany: State University of New York Press, 2005) – this Bosteels interview of Badiou has been reprinted in the appendix to Bosteels' book Badiou and Politics, published in 2011
