= Martine Abdallah-Pretceille =

French scholar

Martine Abdallah-Pretceille is a French scholar who has contributed to renewing thinking on interculturality since the 1980s. She is professor emeritus at the University of Paris VIII and was made Chevalier de la Légion d’Honneur in 2009.

She wrote a PhD under the guidance of Louis Porcher.

== Bibliography ==
- (dir.), Les métamorphoses de l'identité, Paris, Economica, 2006 ISBN 978-2-7178-5286-8
- L'éducation interculturelle, PUF, Collection: « Que sais-je? » n° 3487, 2004 ISBN 978-2-13-054402-9
- Former et éduquer en contexte hétérogène.: Pour un humanisme du divers, Paris, Economica, 2003 ISBN 978-2-7178-4632-4
- with Louis Porcher, Éducation et communication interculturelle [2e éd.] - Paris, PUF, 2001 (Éducation et formation - L'éducateur) ISBN 2-13-052293-9
- Vers une pédagogie interculturelle, Paris, Anthropos, 1999 ISBN 2-7178-3122-3
- with Louis Porcher, Diagonales de la communication interculturelle, Paris, Anthropos, 1999 ISBN 2-7178-3783-3
- with Louis Porcher, Éducation et communication interculturelle, Anthropos, Collection « Exploration interculturelle et science sociale », 1999 ISBN 978-2-7178-3122-1
- with Louis Porcher, Diagonales de la communication interculturelle, Paris, Economica, 1999 ISBN 978-2-7178-3783-4
- Maîtriser les écrits du quotidien, Paris, Retz, 1998, ISBN 2-7256-1939-4
- (dir.), Quelle école pour quelle intégration ? Paris, CNDP, Hachette éducation, 1992. (Ressources formation)
