= Alain Bertho =

French anthropologist

Alain Bertho is a French anthropologist, professor at the University of Paris 8. His fields of research are urban anthropology, political anthropology, anthropology of globalization and alter-globalization.

== Works ==
=== The globalization of riots ===
In his book "Le temps des émeutes" (The Time of the Riots - this book has not yet been translated into English), Alain Bertho argues that globalization does not only affect economic exchange. The riot, social phenomenon that we often wrongly reduce to a one-off and isolated event, is developing all over the world. In view of the past ten years, according to Alain Bertho, no country is immune to these outbreaks of violence. The record of events reveals a great diversity of causes and profiles: political upheavals (Tibet and Algeria in 2008), overflows with the death of a young person (Australia and France in the early 2000), communal clashes (United Kingdom, India and the United States in the late 1980s and into the next decade), suburban crisis (as in France in 2005), riots following a price increase (Venezuela, Brazil ...) and so on. However, the author says, as much as these events are short and violent, they are quickly relegated to the shadows of history. It is therefore necessary both to recall the novelty, to measure the extent and especially to understand its meaning.

- A first common feature of many riots today is their urban location. The city is where took place all the land issues. However, because they can produce stigma and forced mobility, renewal policies are undermining the social cohesion and sharpened tensions.
- At a time when capitalism digests somehow its financial follies, the struggle for decent living conditions is another common characteristic (protest against high prices in Guyana, responding to power cuts in Guinea ...).
- The youthful character of the people protesting is also remarkable. High-profiled, thanks to the Internet in particular, the riots are to be finally understood as an expression of discontent.
- They sign the end of modern politics into a period where, all over the world, states recombine their actions and where global governance has effects in the lives of all of us.
- But the riot is not only a symptom of crisis, it also carries a strong demand, namely the possibility of communication through channels other than those of traditional institutions. It remains to find the forms of this dialogue so that, finally, the violence is no longer the main way to tell his anger and protest against the world as it goes.

=== International Observatory on Suburbs and Outskirts ===
With the French anthropologist Sylvain Lazarus, Alain Bertho has founded in 2008 l'Observatoire international des banlieues et des périphéries (OIBP) and produces researches in France, Brazil and Senegal.

== Bibliography (only in French) ==
- 2016 Les enfants du chaos, Editions La Découverte, 2016 translated as The Age of Violence. The Crisis of Political Action and the end of Utopia, London, Verso, 2018.
- 2009 Le temps des émeutes, Bayard, 272 pages
- 2008 Nous-autres nous-mêmes, ethnologie politique du présent, Le Croquant, mars 2008
- 2003 L’État de guerre, La Dispute, 158 pages.
- 1999 Contre l’État, la politique, La Dispute, 282 pages.
- 1997 Banlieue, banlieue, banlieue, La Dispute, 156 pages.
- 1996 La crise de la politique : du désarroi militant à la politique de la ville, L’Harmattan, collection « Logiques sociales », 288 pages.
- 1991 Ceux du Val de Marne, vingt-cinq ans de luttes sociales, Messidor, 200 p.
