= Éric Hazan =

French author and editor (1936–2024)

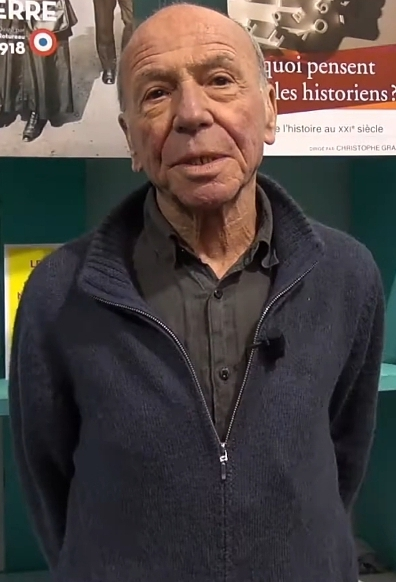
- Hazan in 2013
- Born: 23 July 1936; Neuilly-sur-Seine, France
- Died: 6 June 2024 (aged 87); Paris, France
- Education: Lycée Louis-le-Grand
- Occupations: Author; Editor; Surgeon

Éric Hazan (23 July 1936 – 6 June 2024) was a French author and editor. He was the founder of La Fabrique.

== Biography ==
Born in Paris on 23 July 1936, Hazan's mother was a Romanian Jew originally from Palestine, while his father, Fernand Hazan, was a Jew originally from Egypt and the brother of editor and librarian Émile Hazan. During World War II, his family took refuge in Marseille. After the war, his father founded the publishing house Éditions Hazan. Hazan attended the Lycée Louis-le-Grand and joined communist activists, as well as the National Liberation Front during the Algerian War. He became a cardiovascular surgeon and campaigned for abortion rights in France. In 1975, as a founder of the Association France-Palestine Solidarité, he travelled to Lebanon during the civil war to work as a combat doctor. He was a member of the Russel Tribunal on Palestine, which began work on 4 March 2009.

In 1983, Hazan gave up surgery and became director of the family publishing business, Éditions Hazan. However, he left management after the publisher was acquired by Groupe Hachette. In 1998, he founded the publishing house La Fabrique ("The Factory"), where the works published were primarily left-wing and historical or philosophical. He allegedly only published works by his friends according to Libération, which included the authors Norman Finkelstein and Houria Bouteldja. The Coming Insurrection, published, written by The Invisible Committee and published by La Fabrique was denounced by Minister of the Interior Michèle Alliot-Marie and led to Hazan's testimony in the Tarnac affair. He also wrote and translated more than twenty works, including those of Edward Said.

Éric Hazan died in Paris on 6 June 2024, aged 87. Jacques Rancière wrote a tribute to him in Liberation, published in English in the New Left Review.

== Publications ==
=== Books ===
- L'Invention de Paris, il n'y a pas de pas perdus (2002)
- Chronique de la guerre civile (2004)
- Faire mouvement (2005)
- LQR : la propagande du quotidien (2006)
- Notes sur l’occupation : Naplouse, Kalkilyia, Hébron (2006)
- Changement de propriétaire, la guerre civile continue (2007)
- L'Antisémitisme partout. Aujourd'hui en France (2011)
- Paris sous tension (2011)
- Vues de Paris 1750-1850 (2011)
- Un État commun. Entre le Jourdain et la mer (2012)
- Une histoire de la Révolution française (2012)
- Reflections on Anti-Semitism (2013)
- Premières mesures révolutionnaires (2013)
- La Barricade : Histoire d'un objet révolutionnaire (2013)
- La Dynamique de la révolte. Sur des insurrections passées et d'autres à venir (2015)
- Une traversée de Paris (2016)
- Pour aboutir à un livre. La fabrique d’une maison d’édition (2016)
- À travers les lignes. Textes politiques (2017)
- Balzac (2018)
- Police (2020)
- Le Tumulte de Paris (2021)

=== Translations ===
- Bush à Babylone : la recolonisation de l'Irak (Bush in Babylon: The Recolonisation of Iraq) by Tariq Ali (2004)
- Le Contrôle de la parole. L'édition sans éditeur by André Schiffrin (2005)
- L'Héritage de Sharon : détruire la Palestine, suite by Tanya Reinhart (2006)
- L'Argent et les Mots (Words and Money) by André Schiffrin (2010)
- La Commune de Shanghai et la Commune de Paris by Hongsheng Jiang (2014)
