= Piera Aulagnier =

French psychiatrist

Piera Aulagnier (Note: Also Piera Castoriadis-Aulagnier from 1968 to 1978.) (French: [olaɲe]; née Spairani, Italian: [spaiˈraːni]; November 19, 1923 – March 31, 1990) was an Italian-born French psychiatrist and psychoanalyst. Her contributions to psychoanalysis include the concepts of interpretative violence, pictogram and originary process.

== Life and contributions ==
Aulagnier was born in Milan in 1923 and studied medicine in Rome, before moving to Paris in 1950 to finish her psychiatric training. She undertook a training analysis with Jacques Lacan from 1955 to 1961, and followed him in 1964 into the newly formed École freudienne de Paris, where she remained for some time a close confidant. In 1969, however, Aulagnier, Jean-Paul Valabrega and François Perrier split from the EFP over the bitter question of the Pass as a qualification for analyst status, and created the Organisation psychanalytique de langue française (OPLF), the so-called Quatrième Groupe (Fourth Group). (Note: It was called the Fourth Group because it was the fourth major psychoanalytic group to emerge in France, following SPP (founded in 1926), EFP (1964–1980; originally known as SFP, 1953–1963), and APF (founded in 1964).) The organization played a prominent role in post-Lacanian psychoanalysis. Clinically, Aulagnier specialized in the treatment of psychosis at the Sainte-Anne Hospital Center, where she read a weekly seminar from 1962 until the year of her death. She co-founded the journals L'Inconscient in 1967, and Topique two years later.

Aulagnier is considered one of the most influential French psychoanalysts of her generation, together with Jean Laplanche, Jean-Bertrand Pontalis and André Green. She created an original, if difficult, theory of child psychosis, revolving around the experiences of infant-mother relationships in early childhood, and drawing on and developing the theories of both Winnicott and Lacan. In particular she proposed the concept of the pictogram as an initial link between the body zones and the first mental representations; and continued to work for a theoretical recuperation of the importance of body and feelings as non-verbal presences within early thought. She also warned against the danger of interpretations being experienced as invasive by an analysand, (particularly when their own omnipotence has been projected onto the analyst).

Her first marriage was to businessman André Aulagnier, with whom she had a son, Claude. She later married philosopher Cornelius Castoriadis in 1968. They divorced in 1978. Aulagnier died of lung cancer in Paris in 1990.

== Selected writings ==
- Piera Castoriadis-Aulagnier. The Violence of Interpretation. From Pictogram to Statement, trans. Alan Sheridan (2001 [1975]). The New Library of Psychoanalysis 41. London: Brunner-Routledge. ISBN 978-0-4152-3676-8.

== See also ==
- Guy Rosolato
- Jenny Aubry
- Maud Mannoni
- Serge Leclaire
