= Oscar Masotta =

Argentine academic (1930–1979)

- Born: 8 January 1930; Buenos Aires, Argentina
- Died: 13 September 1979; Barcelona, Spain
- Occupation(s): Psychoanalyst, writer, essayist
- Movement: Psychoanalysis, Lacanianism

Oscar Abelardo Masotta (8 January 1930 – 13 September 1979) was an Argentine essayist, artist, teacher, semiotician, art critic, and psychoanalyst. He was associated with the Torcuato di Tella Institute. He translated Jacques Lacan's works into Spanish and introduced his psychoanalytic philosophy to Latin America.

== Career ==
During the 1960s Masotta was linked to the artistic vanguard of the Torcuato di Tella Institute. Although some of his work on Lacanianism began prior to the 1960s, during the first half of the decade he almost exclusively dedicated himself to the pursuit of Lacanian psychoanalysis.

In 1974, in search of more favourable perspectives than what was present in Argentina, Masotta visited London. It was there that he decided to march to Barcelona, where he became a radical, and where he died on 13 September 1979, at age of 49.

=== 1950s ===
Masotta was a member of the generation marked by the Revolución Libertadora in 16 September 1955. The intellectuals of this era discussed Marxism, existentialism, and Peronism at the University of Buenos Aires. The university was a source of intellectual inspiration for Masotta's contemporaries.

At the university as a philosophy student, Masotta began reading the French journal, Les Temps modernes. Through this journal, he had become acquainted with the thinking of Jean-Paul Sartre, Maurice Merleau-Ponty, and Jean-Bertrand Pontalis. Together, with a group linked to the Center of Philosophy Students, Masotta began writing for the left-wing magazine, Contoro. Masotta formed a trio of critics and essayists consisting of himself, Juan José Sebreli, and Carlos Correas. They were attracted to Peronism and a Sartrean variety of existentialism.

In mid-1955 Masotta collaborated on two pieces for "Working Class" (Spanish: Clase Obrero), a branch of the Workers' Communist Movement that was funded and directed by Rodolfo Puiggrós. In 1959, Masotta published "the Phenomenology of Sartre and a Work of Daniel Lagache" (Spanish: La fenomenología de Sartre y un trabajo de Daniel Lagache) in the magazine Centro. This was his first written reference to the work of Jacques Lacan as well as to the magazine "La Psychanalyse".

=== 1960s ===
Enrique Pichon-Rivière invited Masotta to a discussion at a conference titled "Jacques Lacan or the Inconsistency in Philosophy" at the Institute of Social Psychology on 12 March 1964. This conference was published in issue 9 of the Past and Present Magazine (Spanish: Revista Pasado y Presente) in 1965. It is considered the first Spanish text dedicated to Lacan's work.

During 1967 Masotta dedicated himself to work at length on questions related to culture and published "Pop Art" (Spanish: El Pop Art), an account of his conferences at the Center of Visual Arts at the Torcuato di Tella Institute. One year later, the publishing house Editorial Jorge Álvarez published Happenings, a collective piece by various freelance artists to which he contributed.

Masotta also directed the comic strip magazine LD (Spanish: LD Literatura Dibujada).

=== 1970s ===
In 1970 Masotta published "Introduction to Reading Jacques Lacan" (Spanish: Introducción a la lectura de Jacques Lacan). That same year, the Ediciones Paidós published Masotta's "Comics in the Modern World" (Spanish: La historieta en el mundo moderno).

In June 1971 Masotta appeared in the first issue of the magazine "Sigmund Freud Notebooks" (Spanish: Cuadernos Sigmund Freud) with a work titled "Themes of Jacques Lacan" (Spanish: Temas de Jacques Lacan). He ran the collection "The Cases of Sigmund Freud" (Spanish: Los Casos de Sigmund Freud) in the New Vision Editorial (Spanish: Editorial Nueva Visión).

In 1972 Masotta invited psychoanalysts Maud and Octave Mannoni to Buenos Aires to give a series of conferences. The first meeting was held on 4 April 1972. The second came at Central Theatre, with participation from Fernando Ulloa, José Bleger, Mimí Langer, and Ricardo Malfé. The conferences were recorded and published in the second and third issues of Sigmund Freud Notebooks.

Throughout the second semester of 1972, Masotta taught seminars as a chairman of the Psychopathology of the Faculty of Philosophy and Arts. These were recorded and published in the fourth issue of Sigmund Freud Notebooks, titled "Oedipus, Castration, and Perversion" (Spanish: Edipo, castración y perversión). It would later be included in Lacanian Essays (Spanish: Ensayos lacanianos).

In the middle of the second semesters of the Goethe-Institut and the Argentinian Scientific Association, Alemana invited Masotta to participate in the Cycle in Homage to Sigmund Freud. The conferences were held on 1 October 1972 at the Aula Magna Faculty of Medicine of Buenos Aires. They were recorded and published in the fourth issue of Sigmund Freud Notebooks. The conference was hosted by Masotta, and was titled "Sigmund Freud and the foundation of psychoanalysis".

In 1974 Masotta founded the Freudian School of Buenos Aires with Gerardo Maeso, Sara Glasman, Javier Aramburu, Samuel Basz, Adolfo Berenstein, Jorge Chamorro, Juan Carlos Cosentino, Benjamín Domb, Norberto Ferreyra, Ricardo Nepomiachi, Luis Peyceré, Norberto Rabinovich, Evarsito Ramos, Oscar Sawicke, Isidoro Vegh, David Yemal, Hugo Levin, and Germán García.

During a 1975 visit to Paris, Masotta was invited to present at the École Freudienne de Paris, at which he would be named "Practising Analyst" for his contributions to the cause of Freudian psychoanalysis.

The pressure on the democratically elected Argentinian government of 1973 had steadily increased following the death of President Juan Perón, and the power struggle between armed leftist and rightist factions generated an environment of hostility. This came to a head with a period of state terror after the 1976 coup d'état.

As a result of the country's new governance, Masotta fled to London, where he taught at the Arbous Association and at Henderson Hospital in Surrey. He would later transfer to Barcelona, which would become his fixed address. While there, he had founded the Freudian Library of Barcelona, and became featured in the Galician Library of Freudian Studies. He also edited the magazine "Texts", and published "Lacanian Essays and Introductory Lessons to Psychoanalysis".

In 1977 Masotta prefaced Lacan's Seminar 11 for the publisher Seix Barral. Masotta sent his Proposition about the Degree Institution at the Freudian School of Buenos Aires to Buenos Aires on 30 March 1977, which his followers knew as the fifth and sixth issues of Sigmund Freud Notebooks.

Faced with legal issues and political infighting by members such as Oscar del Barco at the beginning of 1979, the Freudian School of Buenos Aires saw conflict over who would assume leadership in Masotta's forced absence. The organization, under duress, merged under the Freudian School of Argentina, which formed on 13 July 1979. In light of these events, Masotta spent the remaining years of his life promoting the School.

Masotta's students continue his legacy at institutions such as the School of Lacanian Orientation, or Germán García's Institute Associated with the Freudian Field at the Descartes Center.
