= Daniel Lagache =

French psychiatrist and psychoanalyst (1903–1972)

- Born: 3 December 1903; Paris, France
- Died: 3 December 1972 (aged 69); Ville-d'Avray, France
- Education: École Normale Supérieure
- Scientific career
- Fields: Psychology, psychoanalysis, medicine
- Workplaces: University of Strasbourg; University of Paris

Daniel Lagache (French: [danjɛl laɡaʃ]; December 3, 1903 – December 3, 1972) was a French physician, psychoanalyst, and professor at the Sorbonne.

Lagache became one of the leading figures in twentieth-century French psychoanalysis.

== Career ==
Daniel Lagache began higher education at the École Normale Supérieure (ENS) in 1924. Becoming interested in psychopathology under the influence of Georges Dumas, he began to study medicine — alongside such figures as Raymond Aron, Paul Nizan, and Jean-Paul Sartre — as well as psychiatry. By 1937, he had become chief physician in the clinic directed by Henri Claude. Appointed lecturer in psychology at the University of Strasbourg in 1937, he succeeded to the chair of psychology at the Sorbonne in 1947, before obtaining the chair of psychopathology in 1955.

After a training analysis with Rudolph Loewenstein in the 1930s, Lagache focused his research interests on Freudian psychoanalysis, bolstered by his knowledge of German; and in 1937 his article on "Mourning, melancholia and mania" enabled him to become a full member of the SPP' — the Paris Psychoanalytic Society.

=== Psychoanalytic politics ===
After the war, Lagache's views on training came into increasing conflict with those of the society's establishment, as he sought in a liberal synthesis of psychology and psychoanalysis leverage against the medical authoritarianism upheld by Sacha Nacht. In 1953, Lagache led a break-away from the central body of French psychoanalysis, to form the new Societe Francaise de Psychanalyse (French Society for Psychoanalysis, or SFP), accompanied by such leading figures as Francoise Dolto and Jacques Lacan.

Despite earlier disputes, Lacan and Lagache thereafter worked together side by side in the new Society during the 1950s, Lagache predominantly as supervisor, Lacan as training analyst. Lacan's fulsome tribute in Ecrits belongs to this era: "It is to the work of my colleague Daniel Lagache that we must turn for a true account of the work which...has been devoted to the transference...introducing into the function of the phenomenon structural distinctions that are essential for its critique...between the need for repetition and the repetition of need." In a more critical vein, Lacan also took up Lagache's work on the ego ideal, as a springboard for his own article "Remarque sur le rapport de Daniel Lagache" on the distinction of the ideal ego and the ego ideal'.

The major problem that had however faced the new Society from the start was that of obtaining recognition from the International Psychoanalytical Association (IPA); and here Lacan increasingly appeared as the main obstacle to success. Although both men had been analysed by Loewenstein, Lacan unlike Lagache had reacted violently against his ego psychology, and by 1961 he was publicly attacking Lagache for "personalism" due to the latter's mix of psychology and psychoanalysis.

The result was that for the IPA - in André Green's view – the problem became "how to accept Lagache, while leaving Lacan out". The conflict was only resolved in 1964 with the dissolution of the SFP, and the division of its assets and membership between two new organizations. Lagache became the first president of the new Association Psychanalytique de France (APF), an institution that was swiftly recognized by the IPA in 1965.

== Writings ==
In his teaching, Lagache addresses various areas of psychology, seeking constantly to draw them into a conscious synthesis, in the spirit of his remarkable inaugural lecture on "The Unity of Psychology: experimental psychology and clinical psychology"(1949). However, his work is essentially psychopathological, though also inspired by phenomenology. His little book The Psychoanalysis (1955) was called by Didier Anzieu "a model in terms of accuracy and an example of openness to diversity of fields of application".

Numerous other articles and communications testify to his clinical experience and his extensive research in psychoanalysis. Founder and director of a series called the "Library of Psychoanalysis and Clinical Psychology", Daniel Lagache was also the project leader of the Dictionary of Psychoanalysis (1967), written under his direction by Jean Laplanche and Jean-Bertrand Pontalis. He sought to introduce Freudian concepts into social psychology (for which he established a laboratory at the Sorbonne); and in Criminology, he devoted several studies to criminogenesis.

Three central areas of investigation can perhaps be singled out in his work – on mourning, the transference, and jealousy.

- A pioneer in re-opening the study of mourning prewar, Lagache considered the ritual aspects of mourning as establishing the necessary distance between the living and dead. Aggression was required to carry the process through, but in excessive (manic/masochistic) mourning ties to the dead prevent the necessary separation being adequately executed.
- Using ideas from Structuralism and Gestalt psychology, Lagache in his 1951–1952 Report on Transference stressed its pervasiveness, and the need to complete the unfinished business of the mind expressed in it – supporting Freud's earlier view of transference as the repetition of need, as opposed to his later emphasis on the death drive.
- On jealousy, Lagache singled out the desire "to possess the object totally and exclusively; the 'loved object is seen as a thing, not as an independent consciousness: the possessive lover refuses to acknowledge the alterity of the Other'".

== Criticism ==
Critics such as Élisabeth Roudinesco would argue that Lagache's attempt at the "integration of Freudianism into Janetism", through his emphasis on clinical psychology, was a dead end. Certainly his rival Lacan maintained that "that extraordinary lateral transference, by which the categories of a psychology that re-invigorates its menial tasks with social exploitation acquire a new strength in psychoanalysis", was foredoomed: "I regard the fate of psychology as signed and sealed". Roudinesco concluded that Lagache lost his battle for unification at the same time that he won fame through it.

== See also ==
- Guy Rosolato
- Jean Laplanche
- Juliette Favez-Boutonnier
- Margaret Clark-Williams
- Psychoanalytic theory
