= L'épreuve de l'étranger =

Book by Antoine Berman

- Author: Antoine Berman
- Language: French
- Publication date: 1984
- Pages: 322
- ISBN: 9782070740529

L'épreuve de l'étranger. Culture et traduction dans l'Allemagne romantique: Herder, Goethe, Schlegel, Novalis, Humboldt, Schleiermacher, Hölderlin. is a book by Antoine Berman, published in 1984.

The work has had significant influence among intellectuals. In their book Traduire Freud, André Bourguignon, Pierre Cotet, Jean Laplanche and François Robert reference Berman's book in the context of a discussion of scientific and technical guidance for translation. They argue that, during the age of Romanticism, German literary figures such as Herder, Goethe, Schlegel, Novalis, Hölderlin, Humboldt and Schleiermacher developed a "German theory" in translation, which consciously opposed the "French-style" approach to translation.

This book was translated into English by Stefan Heyvaert with the title The Experience of the Foreign: Culture and Translation in Romantic Germany. Albany: SUNY Press, 1992.
