= Jean Laplanche bibliography =

Bibliography of Jean Laplanche's work

The following is a bibliography of Jean Laplanche's work.

It includes both Laplanche's works and writings on his work.

Laplanche's works have been translated into numerous languages, including Spanish, Portuguese, Italian and German. This article only includes English translations.

The translation into English of Jean Laplanche's complete works began in 2010.

== Jean Laplanche's works ==
=== Monographs and collections ===
	French	English
1961	Hölderlin et la question du père, Paris, PUF	Hölderlin and the Question of the Father. Translator: Luke Carson, 2015.
1967	Vocabulaire de la psychanalyse, with Jean-Bertrand Pontalis, Paris, PUF	The Language of Psychoanalysis. Translator: Donald Nicholson-Smith,1988.
1970	Vie et mort en psychanalyse, Flammarion	Life and Death in Psychoanalysis. Translator: Jeffrey Mehlman, 1976.
1985	Fantasme originaire. fantasmes des origines, origines du fantasme, Paris, Hachette	Fantasy and the Origins of Sexuality
1987	Nouveaux fondements pour la psychanalyse, Paris, PUF	New Foundations for Psychoanalysis, Translated by Jonathan House, New York, The Unconscious in Translation, 2016.
1989	Traduire Freud, with André Bourguignon, Pierre Cotet, Francois Robert, PUF	Translating Freud. Translator: Darius Ornston, 1992.
1992	La révolution copernicienne inachevée (Travaux 1967–1992), Aubier	The Unfinished Copernican Revolution - Selected Works 1967-1992, Translated by Luke Thurston, New York, The Unconscious in Translation, 2020
1993	Le fourvoiement biologisant de la sexualité chez Freud, Paris, Les empêcheurs de penser en rond, 1993.	The biologizing misdrection of sexuality in Freud
1999	Entre séduction et inspiration: l'homme, Paris, PUF	Between Seduction and Inspiration: Man, Edited by Jonathan House and Julie Slotnick, Translated by Jeffrey Mehlman, New York, The Unconscious in Translation, 2015
2007	Sexual. La sexualité élargie au sens freudien. 2000–2006, Paris, PUF	Freud and the Sexual, Edited by John Fletcher, Translated by John Fletcher, Jonathan House and Nicholas Ray, New York, The Unconscious in Translation, 2011
2024	Se faufiler entre les astres. Entretiens 1980-1994, PUF.	Sneaking between the stars. Interviews 1980-1994.
	Glaner les reliques de l'autre. Entretiens 1995-2008, PUF.	Gleaning the relics of the other. Interviews 1995-2008.

=== Lectures and seminars ===
Jean Laplanche lectured extensively, and many of these lectures have been collected in a series of "Problematics," all of which have been published with PUF.

	French	English
1980	Problématiques I: L'angoisse	Problématiques I: Anxiety
1980	Problématiques II: Castration et Symbolisations	Problématiques II: Castration and symbolizations
1980	Problématiques III: La Sublimation	Problématiques III: Sublimation
1981	Problématiques IV: L'inconscient et le ça	Problématiques IV: The unconscious and the Id
1987	Problématiques V: Le baquet. Transcendence du transfert	Problématiques V: The tub. Transcendence of transference
2006	Problématiques VI: L'après-coup	Après-Coup: Problématiques VI, Translated by Jonathan House, New York, The Unconscious in Translation, 2016
2006	Problématiques VII: Le fourvoiement biologisant de la sexualité chez Freud, suivi de Biologisme et biologie	The Temptation of Biology - Freud's Theories of Sexuality, Translated by Donald Nicholson-Smith, New York, The Unconscious in Translation, 2015

== Secondary literature ==
There is an increasing amount of literature on Jean Laplanche's work, with the bulk of it coming from Europe (Udo Hock, Christophe Dejours, Dominique Scarfone) and Northern America (Avgi Saketopoulou, Gila Ashtor, Hélène Tessier).

=== General introductory works ===
- International Dictionary of Psychoanalysis, éd. Alain de Mijolla, 3 vol., Detroit, Thomson/Gale, 2005 (MacMillan Reference Books) ISBN 978-0028659244
- Yvon Brès, «Jean Laplanche (21 juin 1924 – 6 mai 2012)», in Revue philosophique de la France et de l'étranger, n° 137, 2012/3, p. 441-442.
- Brenot, Jean-Louis (ed.): Journées internationales Jean Laplanche, Travail de rêve, travail du rêve. Institut de France – Fondation Jean Laplanche, 2012.
- Dejours, Christophe and Votadoro Felipe (ed.): La séduction à l'origine. L'œuvre de Jean Laplanche, Actes Colloque de Cerisy (juillet 2014). Paris, P.U.F. 2016, ISBN 978-2-13-073326-3
- Dejours, Christophe and Hélène Tessier (ed.): Laplanche et la traduction: Le mytho-symbolique: aide ou obstacle à la traduction?. Actes des Journées internationales. Jean Laplanche à Tutzing (Germany) juin 2016. P.U.F./Humensis, janvier 2018, ISBN 978-2-13-080020-0
- Hock, Udo: Die rätselhaften Botschaften des Anderen. Zum Werk Jean Laplanches. Gießen: Psychosozial-Verlag, 2024.
- Benvenuto,S.: "The Après-Coup, Après Coup: Concerning Jean Laplanche Problématiques VI. L’Après-Coup”, Language and Psychoanalysis, volume 7, issue 2, 2018, pp. 72–87. ISSN 2049-324X.
- Scarfone, Dominique. Laplanche: An introduction. New York, NY: Unconscious in Translation, 2015. ISBN 978-1-942254-03-4
- Scarfone, Dominique. The unpast: The actual unconscious. New York, NY: The Unconscious in Translation, 2015. ISBN 978-1-942254-06-5
- Scarfone, Dominique, and Avgi Saketopoulou. The reality of the message: Psychoanalysis in the wake of Jean Laplanche. New York, NY: The Unconscious in Translation, 2023. ISBN 978-1-942254-22-5

=== Gender and sexuality ===
- Saketopoulou, Avgi, and Ann Pellegrini. Gender without identity. New York, NY: The Unconscious in Translation, 2023. ISBN 978-1-942254-19-5.
- "Masochism and Sexuality", An Interview with Jacques André, Journal of European Psychoanalysis, 16, 2003, http://www.psychomedia.it/jep/number16/laplanche.htm
