= Muriel Drazien =

American psychoanalyst

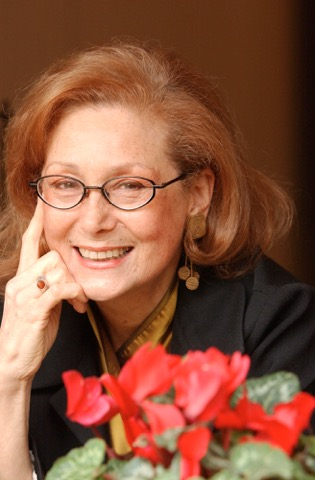
- Muriel Drazien (undated)
- Born: September 7, 1938; New York City, U.S.
- Died: April 14, 2018 (aged 79); Rome, Italy
- Education: Columbia University
- Occupations: Psychoanalyst, author
- Spouse: Pasquale Chessa

Muriel Drazien (September 7, 1938 – April 14, 2018) was an American psychoanalyst working first in Paris and then in Rome, a Lacanian and one of the three Tripode that fostered the teaching of Jacques Lacan in Italy.

== Biography ==
Born in New York City from parents of middle European Ashkenazi Jewish descent she was educated at Columbia University. She won a Fulbright scholarship to study medicine in Paris. There she studied psychoanalysis under the direct tuition of Jacques Lacan and went on to work with many French exponents of his discipline, including Françoise Dolto, Maud Mannoni, Moustapha Safouan. She was one of the founders of École Freudienne de Paris.

Consistent with Lacan's 1973 Letter to the Italians, in which she is nominated along with Contri and Verdiglione, she transferred to work in Rome, where she fostered Lacan's teaching.

In 1983, she founded the Psychoanalytic Association Cosa Freudiana to which she also acted as chairperson.

In 2002, in conjunction with the Italian Ministry of Education, Universities and she founded the Laboratorio Freudiano where she acted as both director and teacher.

She is remembered as a valued member of the Association Lacanienne Internationale.

== Bibliography ==
Mostly in French or Italian:

- Drazien, M. (2007) Couples: Coppie. Una storia psicanalitica: il nodo di Lacan, Carocci,ISBN 9788843040544
- Drazien, M. (2007) Nora fitted Jim like a glove: Nora calzava a Jim come un guanto. Escursione intorno al desiderio maschile e femminile, in Desiderio di uomo e desiderio di donna, Eds. M. Fiumanò, Roma, Carocci. ISBN 9788843043156
- Drazien, M. (2010) Joyce the love between symptom and sinthome: Joyce. L'amour entre symptôme et sinthome, in Dante Alighieri. Les effets inattendus de l'amour de la langue, La Célibataire, 21.
- Drazien, M. (2010) The Gaze of the World: Lo sguardo del mondo L'Osservatore Romano, December 18, 2010. version online
- Drazien, M. (2012) Love of transfert: L’amore di transfert. La formazione di un’analiste, in Le mie sere con Lacan, Editori Internazionale Riuniti, ISBN 978-99-559-9088-8
- Drazien, M. (2013) Joyce and l’élangues: Joyce et l’élangues, in Une journée entière avec James Joyce, La Célibataire, 27.
- Drazien, M. (2016) Lacan reader of Joyce: Lacan lettore di Joyce, Portaparole, ISBN 978-8897539612
- Drazien, M. (2017) The crime of Rina Forte: Le crime de Rina Forte, in Il sapere che viene dai folli, Eds: N. Dissez, C. Fanelli, Roma, Derive Approdi. ISBN 9788865481837.
- Drazien, M. et al. (2004) Dictionary of Psychoanalysis Dizionario di Psicanalisi, Gremese, Roma 2004. ISBN 8884401704.
