= Guy Rosolato =

Guy Rosolato (29 January 1924 – 6 March 2012) was a French psychoanalyst, who was to become president of the Association Psychoanalytique de France (APF).

== Life, career and contributions ==
Born in Constantinople, Rosolato served with the Free French in the war, before going into analysis with Jacques Lacan in 1953. He became a training analyst with the newly formed Société Française de Psychanalyse, and followed Lacan into the École Freudienne de Paris in 1964. However, during the controversy over the passe later in the decade, he would leave to join other influential ex-Lacanians in the APF.

A lover of opera, Rosolato's most distinctive theoretical work concerned the role of the voice in the formation of the body-ego – its role as “acoustic mirror” partway between body and language. He saw the maternal voice as providing, from the womb onwards, what he called a “sonorous envelope” for the developing child - something functioning between, and confounding separation and union, entry and departure.

Rosolato also explored and extended Freud's concept of the dead father, of Totem and Taboo, as well as the confusion between the phallic mother and the primitive father in early childhood thought; and was interested in the interaction of psychoanalysis and cinema (as with the practice of projective identification onto the screen).

He died in Paris.

== See also ==
- André Green
- Didier Anzieu
- Film theory
- Jean Laplanche
- Maria Torok
- Music of the Spheres
