= Masotta =

Masotta is an Italian surname. Notable people with the surname include:

- Karina Masotta (born 1971), Argentine field hockey player
- Oscar Masotta (1930–1979), Argentine writer
