= The Pass (psychoanalysis) =

The Pass (French: la passe) is a procedure that was introduced by Jacques Lacan in 1967 as a means of gathering data on a psychoanalysis and investigating its results. It was adopted as an institutional procedure in the École freudienne de Paris and later in the World Association of Psychoanalysis.

== Historical context ==
In the 1960s, Lacan was increasingly occupied with two intersecting themes: the issue of how to define and assess the end of a psychoanalysis; and the question of the relationship between psychoanalysis and science.

In 1962, when still a member of the Société française de psychanalyse, Lacan called into question Freud’s comments at the end of "Analysis Terminable and Interminable", saying "it really isn’t castration anxiety that in and of itself constitutes the neurotic’s ultimate impasse". Lacan’s tenth seminar, the last prior to his departure from the International Psychoanalytical Association, examines this theme at length.

The following seminar in 1964, The Four Fundamental Concepts of Psychoanalysis, displaced the question "is psychoanalysis a science?", to ask, "what is a science that includes psychoanalysis?" The 1966 text “Science and Truth”, offers a response to this question, opening with the comment: “contrary to what has been trumped up about a supposed break on Freud’s part with the scientism of his time, […] it was this very scientism […] that led Freud, as his writings show, to pave the way that shall forever bear his name".

Lacan acknowledged that some means of communicating and confirming the results of psychoanalysis was called for, and that neither the analyst who directs the treatment, nor any third party observer, could produce epistemologically rigorous accounts.

Lacan’s 1963 break from the IPA and the founding of his School in 1964 created the conditions in which he was able to explore these issues by devising an interface between the clinical setting and the institutional frame. This interface was announced in 1967 in the "Proposition of 9 October on the Psychoanalyst of the School" which put on the table a procedure that has since been described as “an experiment that progresses by stages leading to a result; with the particularity that the experimenter takes himself as the object of experimentation".

The term "Pass" refers to "the passage to the desire to be an analyst".

== Proposition of the Pass ==
Delivered in 1967 and published in the inaugural issue of Scilicet, the text of the "Proposition" is first and foremost an institutional document and thus it opens on the question of the institutional frame, whilst taking care to circumscribe the authority of the psychoanalyst as independent and derived "only from himself".

Although it is often referred to as the "Proposition on the Pass", the "Proposition of 9 October 1967 on the Psychoanalyst of the School" concerns two markedly different institutional titles:

- 1. The first title, Analyst Member of the School (A.M.S.), is delivered on the initiative of the School to any psychoanalyst that it recognises as having "proved himself".
- 2. The second title, Analyst of the School (A.S.), is for a psychoanalyst who seeks "to become responsible for the progress of the School, to become a psychoanalyst through its own experience". To do so, the Analyst of the School will "testify to crucial problems”, specifically "at the vital point" he has reached in so far as he is "working on them or at least working towards resolving them".

The Pass is the procedure that can lead to this second title (A.S.).

The Pass involves the "passand" (the candidate who addresses his request to the School), and a minimum of two "passers". It is to the latter that the passand, "in order to have himself authorised as an analyst of the School, will speak about his analysis". This testimony, gathered separately by the passers, is in turn transmitted, separately, to a jury. The jury will meet as a cartel and give its response: either nomination of Analyst of the School, or no nomination. The passers are effectively "witnesses". They are not part of the jury.

Concerning non-nomination, a 1969 communiqué specified that "the jury can very well decline to approve a candidate as A.S. without this sullying in any way either the pertinence of the psychoanalysis he has done or the capacity of the psychoanalyst who permits the presentation, nor will this fact presume what will become of the candidate as an analyst".

The "Proposition" stipulates that following the experience, "its results must be communicated: to the School initially for criticism, and correlatively placed within reach of those societies which, as excluded as we have been by them, remain our concern nonetheless." This point was developed in 1969: "The one who provides [a teaching] has to come out of it rightly poised for other presentations to find their line of recourse in his one, in other words, he has to harbour a promise to contribute to the work of the A[nalysts of the] S[chool] in a useful way".

== The Pass in the École freudienne de Paris ==
The "Proposition of the Pass" was voted in by the members of the École freudienne de Paris in 1969. However, this was not without some dissention which saw the departure of a handful of more senior members who went on to found the Fourth Group.

In 1973, Lacan said that the Pass is "an experiment that is underway", and that in introducing it through a "Proposition", he was demonstrating great "caution".

In 1978, Lacan expressed some dissatisfaction with the testimonies on the procedure of the Pass in the EFP, going so far as to say that the Pass was thwarted.

== The Pass in the World Association of Psychoanalysis ==
The procedure of the Pass was adopted in the statutes of the École de Cause freudienne when it was founded in 1981. As further Schools were added to the World Association of Psychoanalysis, the Pass became available in other languages and in other countries besides France.

The title A.S. is delivered for a period of three years. The list of Analysts of the School currently in practice can be consulted on-line.

The Procedure of the Pass has functioned with much greater transparency in the WAP than in the EFP: the testimonies by the passands to the passers are followed by public testimonies from the nominated Analysts of the School; the reports of the cartels of the Pass are published; and the inevitable questions raised by this delicate procedure are treated openly and in ad hoc institutional conferences.

The precise composition of the Secretariat and the Commission for the Pass are detailed in the statutes of the School (Articles 15 & 16).

The first testimony from each newly nominated Analyst of the School is delivered during one of the Study Days of the School or the Congress of the WAP. These testimonies are printed in the journals of the Schools.

To date, a number of testimonies have appeared in English in The Psychoanalytical Notebooks of the London Society and in Hurly-Burly.
