= Éric Laurent =

Éric Laurent may refer to:

- Eric Laurent (actor) (1894–1958), a Swedish actor
- Éric Laurent (psychoanalyst), French psychoanalyst
- Éric Laurent (journalist) (born 1947), French journalist
