= François Perrier =

François Perrier may refer to:

- François Perrier (French Army officer) (1835–1888), French soldier and geodesist
- François Perrier (painter) (1590–1650), French painter
- François Perrier (psychoanalyst) (1922–1990), French psychoanalyst
