= Gérard Pommier =

French psychiatrist and psychoanalyst (1941–2023)

- Born: 17 August 1941; Marseille, France
- Died: 1 August 2023 (aged 81); Paris, France
- Education: University of Provence
- Occupations: Psychiatrist; Psychoanalyst

Gérard Pommier (17 August 1941 – 1 August 2023) was a French psychiatrist and psychoanalyst. He was a professor at Paris Diderot University and directed the journal La Clinique Lacanienne.

== Biography ==
Born on 17 August 1941, Pommier interned at a psychiatric hospital and earned his license in 1991. In 2000, he defended his doctoral thesis, titled L'écriture comme solution dans la psychose, under the direction of Roland Gori at the University of Provence. In 2003, he defended his thesis for his habilitation, titled Comment les neurosciences démontrent la psychanalyse.

Pommier met Jacques Lacan during seminars at the Sainte-Anne Hospital Center, with whom he carried out psychoanalytic supervisions. He also carried out such studies with Piera Aulagnier and Françoise Dolto. He was a member of the Espace analytique and was a co-founder of the Fondation européenne pour la psychanalyse. He directed the journal La Clinique Lacanienne and was a member of the lecture committee of Cliniques méditerranéennes.

Gérard Pommier died on 1 August 2023, at the age of 81.

== Publications ==
- D'une logique de la psychose (1983)
- L'Exception féminine, essai sur les impasses de la jouissance (1985)
- Le Dénouement d'une analyse (1986)
- L'Ordre sexuel (1989)
- La Névrose infantile de la psychanalyse (1989)
- Libido illimited. Freud apolitique ? (1990)
- Le Dénouement d'une analyse (1993)
- Naissance et renaissance de l'écriture (1993)
- Du bon usage érotique de la colère, et quelques-unes de ses conséquences (1994)
- L'Amour à l'envers. Essai sur le transfert (1995)
- Ceci n'est pas un Pape... Inconscient et culture en Louisiane (1996)
- Louis du Néant. La mélancolie d'Althusser (1998)
- Les Corps angéliques de la postmodernité (2000)
- Comment les neurosciences démontrent la psychanalyse (2004)
- Qu’est-ce que le réel ? Essai psychanalytique (2004)
- Que veut dire « faire l’amour » ? (2010)
- Pour en finir avec le carcan du DSM (2011)
- Le Refoulement. Pourquoi et comment ? (2013)
- Le Nom propre. Fonctions logiques et inconscientes (2013)
- Féminin, révolution sans fin (2016)
- Occupons le Rond-point Marx et Freud (2019)
- Don Juan repenti Repenti. DeMETOOflé, pardonné Livret pour l'opéra de Jacopo Baboni Schilingi (2021)
- Si le Virus nous parlait ? Et si Freud lui répondait ? (2022)
