= Octave Mannoni =

French psychoanalyst and author

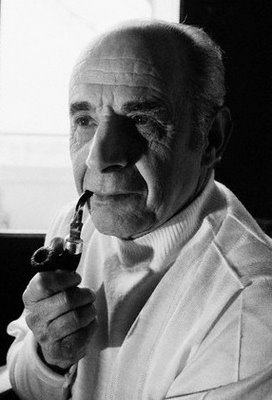
- Born: 29 August 1899; Lamotte-Beuvron, France
- Died: 30 July 1989 (aged 89); Paris, France
- Citizenship: French
- Known for: Psychology of colonization
- Scientific career
- Fields: Psychoanalysis

Dominique-Octave Mannoni (French: [manɔni]; 29 August 1899 – 30 July 1989) was a French psychoanalyst and author.

== Life ==
After spending more than twenty years in Madagascar, Mannoni returned to France after World War II where he, inspired by Lacan, published several psychoanalytic books and articles. In 1964, he followed Lacan into the École Freudienne de Paris, where he remained (with his wife Maud Mannoni) a loyal supporter to the end.

== Work ==
Arguably his most well-known work, Prospero and Caliban: The Psychology of Colonization, deals with colonization and the psychology of the colonizer and the colonized. Mannoni saw the colonizer, with his "Prospero complex" as one in regressive flight from a father complex, using splitting and the scapegoating of the colonized to evade personal problems; the colonized as hiding resentment behind dependency.

The book was later criticized by writers such as Frantz Fanon for underestimating the socio-materialistic roots of the colonial encounter. Fanon also criticized Mannoni for characterizing French racism as taking place only in its colonies. Fanon argued that racism was built into the French metropole, and that Mannoni's failure to recognize this was a major weakness of his theory.

Nevertheless, it was to influence a generation of Shakespeare directors like Jonathan Miller, who considered that Mannoni "saw Caliban and Ariel as different forms of black response to white paternalism".

Another of Mannoni's well-known works was "Clefs pour l'imaginaire ou l'Autre Scène", Seuil, 1969.

== Bibliography ==
- Psychologie de la colonisation, Seuil, 1950, also published as Prospero et Caliban, in 1984, and as Le racisme revisité, in 1997
  - English translation: Prospero and Caliban (1956)
- Lettres personnelles à Monsieur le Directeur, Seuil, 1951, republished as La Machine in 1977, and once more as Lettres personnelles, fiction lacanienne d'une analyse, in 1990
- Freud par lui-même. Éditions du Seuil (1968)
  - English translation: Freud: Theory of the Unconscious. Verso Books, 2015.
- 'The Decolonization of Myself' Race, VII 1966:327-35
- Clefs pour l'imaginaire ou l'Autre Scène, Seuil, 1969
- Fictions freudiennes, Seuil, 1978
- Un commencement qui n'en finit pas : Transfert, interprétation, théorie, Seuil, 1980
- Ça n'empêche pas d'exister, Seuil, 1982
- Un si vif étonnement, Seuil, 1988
- Nous nous quittons, c'est là ma route: carnets, Denoël, 1990

== See also ==
- Aimé Césaire
- Codependency
- Philip Mason
- Postcolonialism
- Serge Leclaire
