= Pasquale Chessa =

Italian historian and journalist

- Born: 5 August 1947 (age 78); Alghero, Italy
- Occupations: Historian; journalist; biographer; author
- Spouse: Muriel Drazien

Pasquale Chessa (born 1947) is an Italian historian and journalist.

He first appeared on cultural programs for the Italian National Radio and then, in turn, worked on the Italian magazines L'espresso, L'Europeo, Epoca, and Panorama.

In 1995, he edited the speeches of the Italian President Francesco Cossiga titled Il torto e il diritto.

He wrote, in 1995, a book of interviews with the historian Renzo De Felice titled Rosso e il nero. Again with Cossiga, in 2003, he co-authored Per carità di Patria. On the theme of Italian history in the first half of the twentieth century, he has authored: in 2005 Guerra Civile 43–45 (a photographic history); in 2007 Italiani sono sempre gli altri, with Francesco Cossiga; in 2008 Dux. Benito Mussolini a biography in pictures; in 2010 L'Ultima lettera di Benito with Barbara Raggi.

Released in the month preceding the historic 2013 re-election of President Giorgio Napolitano, he is the author of L'ultimo comunista. La presa del potere di Giorgio Napolitano. His work is published in Italian with some translations into French.

He is currently the director of the Alguer.it, the newspaper of Alghero in Sardinia and lives between Rome and Paris.

== Prizes ==
- Premio Acqui Storia 2002, popular section, with Interpretazioni su Renzo De Felice (Baldini & Castoldi)

== Works ==
- Il torto e il diritto, with Francesco Cossiga, Mondadori, 1993.
- Rosso e nero, with Renzo De Felice, Milano, Baldini & Castoldi, 1997.
- Interpretazioni su Renzo De Felice, with Francesco Villari, (contains essays by Denis Mack Smith, Marc Lazar and others), Baldini & Castoldi, 2002.
- Per carità di patria: dodici anni di storia e politica italiana, 1992–2003, with Francesco Cossiga, Mondadori, 2003.
- Guerra civile 1943-1945-1948 Mondadori, 2005.
- Italiani sono sempre gli altri. Controstoria d'Italia da Cavour a Berlusconi, with Francesco Cossiga, Mondadori, 2007.
- Dux. Benito Mussolini: una biografia per immagini Mondadori, 2008.
- L'ultima lettera di Benito. Mussolini e Petacci: amore e politica a Salò 1943–45, with Barbara Raggi, Mondadori, 2010.
- L'Ultimo Comunista. La presa del potere di Giorgio Napolitano, Chiarelettere, 2013
