= Scilicet (journal) =

- Discipline: Psychoanalysis
- Language: French, Spanish

Publication details
- History: 1968–present
- Publisher: Éditions du Seuil/Collection rue Huysmans (France)

Standard abbreviations
- ISO 4: Scilicet

Indexing
- ISSN: 0582-2610
- OCLC no.: 785798990

Scilicet is an academic journal that was established in 1968 by Jacques Lacan as the official French-language journal of the École Freudienne de Paris. Published by Éditions du Seuil, it appeared intermittently until the double issue of 1976. The title was revived in 2006 to distribute preparatory texts for the congresses of the World Association of Psychoanalysis and is now published in both French and Spanish. The new series began with a digital volume and has since extended to four print volumes.

== History ==
In the 1964 "Founding Act" of the École Freudienne de Paris, Lacan declared that "The financial holdings constituted initially by the contributions of the members of the École, by the funding it will eventually receive, indeed by the services it will render as a school, will be entirely reserved for its publishing efforts". The first issue of the Lettres de l'École freudienne de Paris appeared in early 1967 and the first issue of Scilicet followed in the spring of 1968, thereby meeting the pledge set out in the Act to create a platform by which to take inventory of the Freudian field.

In Lacan's introduction to Scilicet issue 1 he writes, "This journal is one of the means by which I expect to overcome in my École, which is distinct in its principle from the [existing] Societies, the obstacle that resisted me elsewhere".

The Latin word wikt:scilicet, a frequent term in the writings of Lucretius, literally means "thou mayst know" or "it is permitted thee to know", and the cover of the journal bore the inscription: Tu peux savoir ce qu'en pense l'École freudienne de Paris (thou mayst know what the École freudienne de Paris thinks about it). Lacan defined this "thou" as "the bachelor, in the English sense", as "one who is not married... and, above all, not wed to a psychoanalytic society".

Established at a time of considerable institutional invention, Scilicet adopted the editorial strategy of the Bourbaki group, publishing unsigned articles in an attempt to "overcome the narcissism of small differences" and to open the doors to analysts from outside the EFP whose institutional affiliations might otherwise discourage them from contributing. However, issue 2/3 did carry a list of twenty names of contributors to issue 1. The same editorial policy was later adopted by other psychoanalytic journals.

Initially announced as a triannual publication, the fallout of May 1968, which had a direct bearing on Lacan's teaching at the École Normale Supérieure, delayed the editing of the second issue and the rhythm continued to be sporadic until its final issue.

Scilicet is important in the history of the psychoanalytic movement because of the major texts of Lacan that featured in each of its issues: "Proposition of 9 October on the Psychoanalyst of the School" (issue 1); "Radiophonie" (issue 2/3); "L'étourdit" (issue 4); "...ou pire" (issue 5) and finally the lectures and interviews that Lacan gave at Yale University, Columbia University, and the Massachusetts Institute of Technology in 1975 (issue 6/7).

In 2006, Scilicet was revived for the preparatory work of the fifth congress of the World Association of Psychoanalysis in Rome on "The Name-of-the-Father". A second volume, for the sixth congress in Buenos Aires, appeared in print as "The Objects a in the Psychoanalytic Experience", published by the Collection rue Huysmans (2008). This was followed by "Semblants and Sinthome", the 2010 Paris congress, and then "The Symbolic Order in the Twenty-First Century" (Buenos Aires, 2012).

== English translations ==
Some texts from Scilicet have appeared in English translation:

- Lacan, Jacques, "Proposition of 9 October on the Psychoanalyst of the School" in Analysis, 6, ISSN 1324-5155 (from Scilicet 1).
- Anonymous, "The Phallic Phase and the Subjective Import of the Castration Complex" in Feminine Sexuality, Norton & Co., pp. 99–122. ISBN 0393302113 (from Scilicet 1)
- Lacan, Jacques, "Sign, Symbol, Imaginary" in On Signs, Johns Hopkins, 1985, pp. 203–206 (a partial translation of "Radiophonie" from Scilicet 2/3)
- Lacan, Jacques, "Columbia University Lecture on the Symptom". Culture/Clinic, 1 2013. (from Scilicet 6/7)
- Miller, Jacques-Alain, "Semblants and Sinthome". Hurly-Burly 1 2009 pp. 87–96.
- Laurent, Dominique, "Woman". Hurly-Burly 2 2009 pp. 35–37.
- Borie, Jacques, "Disconnection". Hurly-Burly 3 2010 pp. 61–63.
- Leguil, François, "Mania". Hurly-Burly 3 2010 pp. 65–67.
- Hellebois, Philippe, "Lalangue". Hurly-Burly 3 2010 pp. 69–71.

== See also ==
- List of psychotherapy journals
