= Case of Aimée =

1932 French doctoral thesis used to argue the theory of self-punishing paranoia

The Case of Aimée concerned the Frenchwoman Marguerite Pantaine (Marguerite Anzieu), who in 1931 attacked the celebrity actress Huguette Duflos. Marguerite was hospitalised in a mental hospital, and was treated by Jacques Lacan, becoming the subject of his doctoral thesis.

== Thesis ==
Lacan used the pseudonym "Aimée" to protect the identity of Marguerite Pantaine. In his thesis, he linked "Aimée"'s psychosis to her life experience, developing a theory of psychogenic psychosis which drew heavily on psychoanalysis to explain phenomena not usually tractable by psychoanalytic methods. Lacan argued that Aimée regarded her attack on the actress as an attack against a persecutory aspect of her own psyche, namely the image of her own Ideal ego; and that she carried out the attack in a sort of narcissistic trance. He used her case to develop a theory of self-punishing paranoia.

It was, however, primarily in the form of ego psychology that Lacan's psychoanalytic thinking was at this point framed: "The therapeutic problem regarding psychosis seems to me to make a psychoanalysis of the ego more necessary than a psychology of the unconscious."

== Later identification ==
Ten years after Marguerite was discharged from hospital, she went to work for Lacan's father, and her estranged son Didier Anzieu went into analysis with Lacan. When the two Anzieus reunited, Didier realised his mother had been the subject of Lacan's thesis the decade before.

Elisabeth Roudinesco reports the mother's complaint that Lacan, instead of helping her, "had stolen her life story and turned it into a thesis," and that she "had been observed, ransacked, fabricated, travestied, and made into a myth for the benefit of psychiatry."

== See also ==
- Erotomania
- Karl Jaspers
- Christine and Léa Papin (Papin sisters)
- Salvador Dalí
- Philosophy of Baruch Spinoza
