= Éric Laurent (psychoanalyst) =

French psychoanalyst

Éric Laurent (born 1945) is a French psychoanalyst and former president of the World Association of Psychoanalysis.

== Biography ==
Trained by Jacques Lacan in the nineteen-seventies, Éric Laurent was a member of the directorate of the École freudienne de Paris at the time of the School's dissolution in 1980 and has been a member of the École de la Cause freudienne since its inception. He was editor-in-chief of La Cause freudienne from 1992 to 1994 and currently teaches within the framework of the Clinical Section of the Department of Psychoanalysis at University Paris-VIII. From 2006 to 2010, he was the third President of the World Association of Psychoanalysis, overseeing the organisation of its sixth international congress (Buenos Aires, 2008) and its seventh (Paris, 2010).

He is the author of the 2006 "Guiding Principles for Any Psychoanalytic Act". In 1998, he delivered the key-note lecture at the Clinical Limits of Gender Conference in London, organised by the European School of Psychoanalysis and in 2011, he was invited to give the Abram Kardiner Lecture at the New York Academy of Medicine. He lectures widely in Europe, Israel and Latin America and his articles are regularly published in English, French, Spanish and Italian.

In 2008 he published Lost in Cognition (published in English in 2014 by Karnac books) on psychoanalysis and the cognitive sciences; in 2012 La bataille de l’autisme : de la clinique à la politique (Navarin/Champ freudien, 2012) on the political and clinical stakes of autism; in 2016 L'envers de la biopolitique. Une écriture pour la jouissance on the question of enjoyment and writing in the last Lacan's teaching.
