= François Perrier (psychoanalyst) =

French psychiatrist and psychoanalyst

François Perrier (French: [fʁɑ̃swa pɛʁje]; 25 July 1922 – 2 August 1990) was a French psychiatrist, and psychoanalyst.

Perrier played a prominent role in Lacanianism and in post-Lacanian psychoanalysis.

He was born and died in Paris.

== Career ==
Perrier studied medicine and psychiatry in Paris; and became a psychoanalyst after a first analysis with Maurice Bouvet, a second with Sasha Nacht, and a third with Jacques Lacan.

As a Lacanian, he became one of the so-called 'three musketeers' of leading disciples, to be known as the 'troika': Serge Leclaire, Wladimir Granoff and François Perrier.

Perrier was called by Élisabeth Roudinesco "the wandering troubadour of Lacanianism, naive and passionate, as whimsical as his master (whose genius he lacked), but a prodigious theorist of female sexuality, hysteria, and love".

In a more critical judgement, linking his obsessive father complex to his ambivalent search for a psychoanalytic master, she also considered him to have frittered away his career "between presumptiousness and aimlessness".

=== Psychoanalytic politics ===
After belonging to the Société psychanalytique de Paris, Perrier took part in the creation of the Société Française de Psychanalyse (S.F.P.) in 1953.

Together with Granoff, and Leclaire, in the early 1960s Perrier attempted to have the SFP acknowledged formally by the International Psychoanalytical Association (IPA). After the failure of their efforts, it was at Perrier's house, in the presence of Jacques Lacan and Nathalie Zaltzman, his ex-wife, that the founding of the Ecole Freudienne de Paris took place in 1964.

Perrier was the first to resign from the board of the new institution, in 1966, over the question of training; and in 1969, in what has been called the third schism in French psychoanalytic history, he, along with Piera Aulagnier, Jean-Paul Valabrega, and (a minority of) others broke away from the EFP to set up a fourth group: the Organisation psychanalytique de langue francaise (OPFL). The first president of the Quatrième Groupe, Perrier would eventually resign from it in 1981.

Perrier came to conclude that Jacques Lacan was "a troublemaker of genius"; and that his followers were "travellers in the realm of 'Translacania'", as he would call it.

=== Letter to Lacan ===
Roudinesco highlighted for critical attention a letter he wrote to Lacan in 1965, shortly after the EFP was formed:

You are in the process of destroying what you claim to found, whether it be a school or a treaty of trust with your friends... bringing out the fact that your own relationship to any collegiate body is that of a loner, one who excludes himself voluntarily and rejects all groups... The difficulty you have in relating to any independent group, especially if it consists of true friends, always brings you back to the special relationship, the two-man understanding dependent on complicity toward any third person. And so you always divide but never rule".

Unfortunately, for all the acuteness of Perrier's diagnosis of the organisational impasse Lacan's personality would create, he had no solution, other than his eventual departure for the Fourth Group.

== Work ==
Perrier produced a large body of work, ranging from phobia (1956), psychosis (1956 and after), and erotomania (1966), to alcoholism and female sexuality, while also contributing to the question of the training analysis (1969).

On erotomania, Perrier made a link between the early observations of Clérambault and Lacan's later work. He saw motherhood as a way for female sexuality to live out its disturbances, but also as an opportunity to work through them.

In a witty formulation on love and childhood, Perrier argued that "what kills childhood is knowledge; what kills love is knowledge. Yet...there is no true love except in the aptitude of a subject, or two subjects, to return to childhood".

=== Writings ===
1. L'Amour, Ed.: Hachette Pluriel, 1998, ISBN 2-01-278939-0
2. La Chaussée d'Antin : Oeuvre psychanalytique I, Ed.: Albin Michel, 2008, ISBN 2-226-17917-8
3. La Chaussée d'Antin : Oeuvre psychanalytique II, Ed.: Albin Michel, 2008, ISBN 2-226-17916-X
4. Les corps malades du signifiant: séminaires 1971–1972. Paris: InterÉditions (1984)
5. Double lecture: le transubjectal: séminaires 1973–1974. Paris: InterÉditions (1985)

Perrier, François; and Granoff, Vladimir. (1960). Le désir et le féminin. Paris: Aubier.

== See also ==
- Lacanian movement
- Psychoanalytic Theory
