= Dead mother complex =

Psychoanalytic phenomenon expressing the sudden anticathexis of the child by its mother

The dead mother complex is a clinical condition described by André Green involving an early and destructive identification with the figure of a "dead" – or rather depressed and emotionally unavailable – mother.

== Concept ==
Green introduced the concept in an essay which was written in French in 1980, published in 1983, and translated into English in 1986. He described the dead mother complex as involving a mother who was initially emotionally engaged with her child, but who then "switched off" from emotional resonance to emotional detachment, perhaps under the influence of loss and mourning in her own family of origin. The impact on the child, when it finds itself unable to restore a feeling contact, is the internalisation of a hard unresponsive emotional core, which fosters a destructive form of narcissism, contributes to attachment disorders, and reveals itself as a major resistance to progress in the transference.

Later writers have argued for differentiating a range of responses within the dead mother complex, reserving the name dead mother syndrome for the most acute form.

== Literary examples ==
The dead mother complex has been seen as underlying both the novel Gradiva and Freud's essay on it, Delusion and Dream in Jensen's Gradiva.

Sylvia Plath's writing has been linked to the dead mother complex.

== See also ==
- Egon Schiele
- Frances Tustin
- Phallic mother
- Psycho (1960 film)
