= Lacanianism =

Theoretical system of psychoanalysis

Lacanianism or Lacanian psychoanalysis is a theoretical system initiated by the work of Jacques Lacan from the 1950s to the 1980s. It is a theoretical approach that attempts to explain the mind, behaviour, and culture through a structuralist and post-structuralist extension of classical psychoanalysis. Lacanian perspectives contend that the human mind is structured by the world of language, known as the Symbolic. They stress the importance of desire, which is conceived of as perpetual and impossible to satisfy. Contemporary Lacanianism is characterised by a broad range of thought and extensive debate among Lacanians.

Lacanianism has been particularly influential in post-structuralism, literary theory, and feminist theory, as well as in various branches of critical theory, including queer theory. Equally, it has been criticised by the post-structuralists Deleuze and Guattari and by various feminist theorists. Outside France, it has had limited clinical influence on psychiatry. There is a Lacanian strand in left-wing politics, including Saul Newman's and Duane Rousselle's post-anarchism, Louis Althusser's structural Marxism, and the works of Slavoj Žižek and Alain Badiou. Influential figures in Lacanianism include Žižek, Julia Kristeva and Serge Leclaire.

== Overview ==
Lacanians view the structure of the mind as defined by the individual's entry as an infant into the world of language, the Symbolic, through an Oedipal process. Like other post-structuralist approaches, Lacanianism regards the subject as an illusion created when an individual is signified (represented in language). However, this initial signification is incomplete, as there is always something about the subject which cannot be properly represented in language, which means that signification also divides the subject. The Symbolic is defined by the Other, those parts of the outside world with which the subject cannot identify, which is the place where signifiers are given meaning. Language is hence a discourse of the Other, outside conscious control.

The unconscious mind is constituted by a network of empty signifiers that resurface in language—particularly dreams and Freudian slips—and Lacanian clinical practice focuses closely on the precise words used by the analysand (patient), which Lacan characterised as a "return to Freud". Analysis focuses largely on desire. Lacanians contend that desire cannot be satisfied, as the object and cause of desire is an unobtainable object, the objet petit a, which the subject continually associates with different things that they wrongly believe will satisfy their desire. Objet a exists as a consequence of the division of the subject in signification, so desire is said to result from an unsolvable lack at the heart of the subject.

Lacanianism posits that all people belong to one of three "clinical structures" and are either psychotic, perverse, or, most commonly, neurotic. Neurotic subjects—that is to say, most people—are then always either hysterical or obsessional. The three clinical structures describe the subject's relationship to the Other and are each associated with a different defence mechanism: psychotics use foreclosure, a rejection of the father's authority in the Oedipus complex that results in a failure to form a Symbolic unconscious; perverts use disavowal, failing to accept that lack causes desire and nominating a specific object as its cause, their fetish; and neurotics use repression.

Psychical reality is constituted by the Symbolic, the Imaginary, the Real, and for Lacanians who follow Kristeva, the Semiotic.

=== Mirror stage ===
Lacan's first official contribution to psychoanalysis was the mirror stage, which he described as "formative of the function of the 'I' as revealed in psychoanalytic experience." By the early 1950s, he came to regard the mirror stage as more than a moment in the life of the infant; instead, it formed part of the permanent structure of subjectivity. In the "imaginary order", the subject's own image permanently catches and captivates the subject. Lacan explains that "the mirror stage is a phenomenon to which I assign a twofold value. In the first place, it has historical value as it marks a decisive turning-point in the mental development of the child. In the second place, it typifies an essential libidinal relationship with the body-image".

As this concept developed further, the stress fell less on its historical value and more on its structural value. In his fourth seminar, "La relation d'objet", Lacan states that "the mirror stage is far from a mere phenomenon which occurs in the development of the child. It illustrates the conflictual nature of the dual relationship. "

The mirror stage describes the formation of the ego via the process of objectification, the ego being the result of a conflict between one's perceived visual appearance and one's emotional experience. This identification is what Lacan called "alienation". At six months, the baby still lacks physical coordination. The child can recognize themselves in the mirror before they gain full control of their body movements.The child sees their image as a whole, and the synthesis of this image produces a sense of contrast with the lack of coordination of the body, which is perceived as a fragmented body. The child experiences this contrast initially as a rivalry with their image because the wholeness of the image threatens the child with fragmentation—thus, the mirror stage gives rise to an aggressive tension between the subject and the image. To resolve this aggressive tension, the child identifies with the image: this primary identification with the counterpart forms the ego. Lacan understood this moment of identification as a moment of jubilation, since it leads to an imaginary sense of mastery; yet when the child compares their own precarious sense of mastery with the omnipotence of the mother, a depressive reaction may accompany the jubilation.

Lacan calls the specular image "orthopaedic" since it leads the child to anticipate the overcoming of its "real specific prematurity of birth". The vision of the body as integrated and contained, in opposition to the child's actual experience of motor incapacity and the sense of his or her body as fragmented, induces a movement from "insufficiency to anticipation". In other words, the mirror image initiates and then aids, like a crutch, the process of the formation of an integrated sense of self.

In the mirror stage, a "misunderstanding" (méconnaissance) constitutes the ego—the "me" (moi) becomes alienated from itself through the introduction of an imaginary dimension to the subject. The mirror stage also has a significant symbolic dimension due to the presence of the figure of the adult who carries the infant. Having jubilantly assumed the image as their own, the child turns their head towards this adult, who represents the big other, as if to call on the adult to ratify this image.

=== Desire ===
Lacan's concept of desire is related to Hegel's Begierde, a term that implies a continuous force, and therefore somehow differs from Freud's concept of Wunsch. Lacan's desire refers always to unconscious desire because it is unconscious desire that forms the central concern of psychoanalysis.

The aim of psychoanalysis is to lead the analysand to recognize their desire and by doing so to uncover the truth about their desire. However this is possible only if desire is articulated in speech: "It is only once it is formulated, named in the presence of the other, that desire appears in the full sense of the term." And again in The Ego in Freud's Theory and in the Technique of Psychoanalysis: "what is important is to teach the subject to name, to articulate, to bring desire into existence. The subject should come to recognize and to name their desire. But it isn't a question of recognizing something that could be entirely given. In naming it, the subject creates, brings forth, a new presence in the world." The truth about desire is somehow present in discourse, although discourse is never able to articulate the entire truth about desire; whenever discourse attempts to articulate desire, there is always a leftover or surplus.

Lacan distinguishes desire from need and from demand. Need is a biological instinct where the subject depends on the Other to satisfy its own needs: in order to get the Other's help, "need" must be articulated in "demand". But the presence of the Other not only ensures the satisfaction of the "need", it also represents the Other's love. Consequently, "demand" acquires a double function: on the one hand, it articulates "need", and on the other, it acts as a "demand for love". Even after the "need" articulated in demand is satisfied, the "demand for love" remains unsatisfied since the Other cannot provide the unconditional love that the subject seeks. "Desire is neither the appetite for satisfaction, nor the demand for love, but the difference that results from the subtraction of the first from the second." Desire is a surplus, a leftover, produced by the articulation of need in demand: "desire begins to take shape in the margin in which demand becomes separated from need". Unlike need, which can be satisfied, desire can never be satisfied: it is constant in its pressure and eternal. The attainment of desire does not consist in being fulfilled but in its reproduction as such. As Slavoj Žižek puts it, "desire's raison d'être is not to realize its goal, to find full satisfaction, but to reproduce itself as desire".

Lacan also distinguishes between desire and the drives: desire is one, and drives are many. The drives are the partial manifestations of a single force called desire. Lacan's concept of "objet petit a" is the object of desire, although this object is not that towards which desire tends, but rather the cause of desire. Desire is not a relation to an object but a relation to a lack (manque).

In The Four Fundamental Concepts of Psychoanalysis Lacan argues that "man's desire is the desire of the Other." This entails the following:

1. Desire is the desire of the Other's desire, meaning that desire is the object of another's desire and that desire is also desire for recognition. Here, Lacan follows Alexandre Kojève, who follows Hegel: for Kojève, the subject must risk his own life if he wants to achieve the desired prestige. This desire to be the object of another's desire is best exemplified in the Oedipus complex, when the subject desires to be the phallus of the mother.
2. In "The Subversion of the Subject and the Dialectic of Desire in the Freudian Unconscious", Lacan contends that the subject desires from the point of view of another whereby the object of someone's desire is an object desired by another one: what makes the object desirable is that it is precisely desired by someone else. Again, Lacan follows Kojève. who follows Hegel. This aspect of desire is present in hysteria, for the hysteric is someone who converts another's desire into their own (see Sigmund Freud's "Fragment of an Analysis of a Case of Hysteria" in SE VII, where Dora desires Frau K because she identifies with Herr K). What matters then in the analysis of a hysteric is not to find out the object of her desire but to discover the subject with whom she identifies.
3. Désir de l'Autre, which is translated as "desire for the Other" (though it could also be "desire of the Other"). The fundamental desire is the incestuous desire for the mother, the primordial Other.
4. Desire is "the desire for something else", since it is impossible to desire what one already has. The object of desire is continually deferred, which is why desire is a metonymy.
5. Desire appears in the field of the Other—that is, in the unconscious.

Last but not least for Lacan, the first person who occupies the place of the Other is the mother, and at first, the child is at her mercy. Only when the father articulates desire with the Law by castrating the mother is the subject liberated from desire for the mother.

== History ==
=== Jacques Lacan's lifetime ===
Lacan considered the human psyche to be framed within the three orders of The Imaginary, The Symbolic and The Real (RSI). The three divisions in their varying emphases also correspond roughly to the development of Lacan's thought. As he himself put it in Seminar XXII, "I began with the Imaginary, I then had to chew on the story of the Symbolic...and I finished by putting out for you this famous Real".

Lacan's early psychoanalytic period spans the 1930s and 1940s. His contributions from this period centered on the questions of image, identification and unconscious fantasy. Developing Henri Wallon's concept of infant mirroring, he used the idea of the mirror stage to demonstrate the imaginary nature of the ego, in opposition to the views of ego psychology.

In the 1950s, the focus of Lacan's interest shifted to the symbolic order of kinship, culture, social structure, and roles—all mediated by the acquisition of language—into which each one of us is born and with which we all have to come to terms.

The focus of therapy became that of dealing with disruptions on the part of the Imaginary of the structuring role played by the signifier/Other/Symbolic Order.

Lacan's approach to psychoanalysis created a dialectic between Freud's thinking and that of both Structuralist thinkers such as Ferdinand de Saussure, as well as with Heidegger, Hegel and other continental philosophers.

The 1960s saw Lacan's attention increasingly focused on what he termed the Real—not external consensual reality, but rather that unconscious element in the personality, linked to trauma, dream, and the drive, which resists signification.

The Real was what was lacking or absent from every totalising structural theory; and in the form of jouissance, and the persistence of the symptom or synthome, marked Lacan's shifting of psychoanalysis from modernity to postmodernity.

Then, the Real, together with the Imaginary and the Symbolic, came to form a triad of "elementary registers." Lacan believed these three concepts were inseparably intertwined, and by the 1970s, they were an integral part of his thought.

=== Multiple "Lacanianisms" ===
Lacan's thinking was intimately geared not only to the work of Freud but to that of the most prominent of his psychoanalytic successors—Heinz Hartmann, Melanie Klein, Michael Balint, D. W. Winnicott and more. With Lacan's break with official psychoanalysis in 1963–1964, however, a tendency developed to look for a pure, self-contained Lacanianism, without psychoanalytic trappings. Jacques-Alain Miller's index to Ecrits had already written of "the Lacanian epistemology...the analytic experience (in its Lacanian definition...)"; and where the old guard of first-generation disciples like Serge Leclaire continued to stress the importance of the re-reading of Freud, the new recruits of the 1960s and 1970s favoured instead an ahistorical Lacan, systematised after the event into a rigorous if over-simplified theoretical whole.

Three main phases may be identified in Lacan's mature work: his 1950s exploration of the Imaginary and the Symbolic; his concern with the Real and the lost object of desire, the objet petit a, during the 1960s; and a final phase highlighting jouissance and the mathematical formulation of psychoanalytic teaching.

As Lacan developed a distinctive style of teaching based on a linguistic reading of Freud in the 1950s, he also built up a substantial following within the Société Française de Psychanalyse (SFP), with Serge Leclaire only the first of many French "Lacanians". It was this phase of his teaching that was memorialised in Écrits, and which first found its way into the English-speaking world, where more Lacanians were thus to be found in English or Philosophy Departments than in clinical practice.

However the very extent of Lacan's following raised serious criticisms: he was accused both of abusing the positive transference to tie his analysands to himself, and of magnifying their numbers by the use of shortened analytic sessions. The questionable nature of his following was one of the reasons for his failure to gain recognition for his teaching from the International Psychoanalytical Association recognition for the French form of Freudianism that was "Lacanianism"—a failure that led to his founding the École Freudienne de Paris (EFP) in 1964. Many of his closest and most creative followers, such as Jean Laplanche, chose the IPA over Lacan at this point, in the first of many subsequent Lacanian schisms.

Lacan's 1973 Letter to the Italians, nominated Muriel Drazien, Giacomo Contri and Armando Verdiglione to carry his teaching in Italy.

As a body of thought, Lacanianism began to make its way into the English-speaking world from the 1960s onwards, influencing film theory, feminist thought, queer theory, and psychoanalytic criticism, as well as politics and social sciences, primarily through the concepts of the Imaginary and the Symbolic. As the role of the real and of jouissance in opposing structure became more widely recognised, however, so too Lacanianism developed as a tool for the exploration of the divided subject of postmodernity.

Since Lacan's death, however, much of the public attention focused on his work has begun to decline. Lacan had always been criticised for an obscurantist writing style; and many of his disciples simply replicated the mystificatory elements in his work (in a sort of transferential identification) without his freshness.

Where interest in Lacanianism did revive in the 21st century, it was in large part the work of figures like Slavoj Žižek who have been able to use Lacan's thought for their own intellectual ends, without the sometimes stifling orthodoxy of many of the formal Lacanian traditions. The continued influence of Lacanianism is thus paradoxically strongest in those who seem to have embraced Malcolm Bowie's recommendation: "learn to unlearn the Lacanian idiom in the way Lacan unlearns the Freudian idiom". Examples include Michael J. Miller's integration of Lacanian theory into American psychotherapy alongside his critique of Lacanianism.

=== During Lacan's lifetime ===
Élisabeth Roudinesco has suggested that, after the founding of the EFP "the history of psychoanalysis in France became subordinate to that of Lacanianism...the Lacanian movement occupied thereafter the motor position in relation to which the other movements were obliged to determine their course'". There was certainly a large expansion in the numbers of the school, if arguably at the expense of quantity over quality, as a flood of psychologists submerged the analysts who had come with him from the SFP. Protests against the new regime reached a head with the introduction of the self-certifying 'passe' to analytic status, and old comrades such as François Perrier broke away in the bitter schism of 1968 to found the Quatrieme Groupe.

However, major divisions remained within the EFP, which underwent another split over the question of analytic qualifications. There remained within the movement a broad division between the old guard of first generation Lacanians, focused on the symbolic—on the study of Freud through the structural linguistic tools of the 1950s—and the younger group of mathematicians and philosophers centred on Jacques-Alain Miller, who favoured a self-contained Lacanianism, formalised and free of its Freudian roots.

Just as Lacan, in the 1970s, spoke of the mathematicisation of psychoanalysis and coined the term "matheme" to describe its formulaic abstraction, Leclaire brusquely dismissed the new formulas as "graffiti". Nevertheless, despite these and other tensions, the EFP held together under the charisma of their Master, until (despairing of his followers) Lacan himself dissolved the school in 1980 the year before his death.

=== Post-Lacanianism ===
The start of the 1980s saw the post-Lacanian movement dissolve into a plethora of new organisations, of which the Millerite École de la cause freudienne (ECF, 273 members) and the Centre de formation et de recherches psychoanalytiques (CFRP, 390 members) are perhaps the most important. By 1993, another fourteen associations had grown out of the former EFP; nor did the process stop there. Early resignations and splits from the ECF were followed in the late 1990s by a massive exodus of analysts worldwide from Miller's organisation under allegations of misuse of authority.

Attempts were made to re-unite the various factions, Leclaire arguing that Lacanianism was "becoming ossified, stiffening into a kind of war of religion, into theoretical debates that no longer contribute anything new". But with French Lacanianism (in particular) haunted by a past of betrayals and conflict—by faction after faction claiming their segment of Lacanian thought as the only genuine one—reunification of any kind has proven very problematic; and Roudinesco was perhaps correct to conclude that "'Lacanianism, born of subversion and a wish to transgress, is essentially doomed to fragility and dispersal".

=== Contemporary Lacanianism ===
Three main divisions can be made in contemporary Lacanianism.

- In one form, the academic reading of a de-clinicalised Lacan has become a pursuit in itself.
- The (self-styled) legitimatism of the ECF, developed into an international movement with strong Spanish support as well as Latin American roots, set itself up as a rival challenge to the IPA.
- The third form is a plural Lacanianism, best epitomised in the moderate CFRP, with its abandonment of the passe and openness to traditional psychoanalysis, and (after the 1995 dissolution) in its two successors.

Attempts to rejoin the IPA remain problematic, however, not least due to the persistence of the 'short session' and of Lacan's rejection of countertransference as a therapeutic tool.

Lacanian theory has also been applied to artificial intelligence. One 2026 article argues that large language models are better understood as an apparatus that mobilises users' fantasy and transference than as a potential subject, and that a chatbot cannot occupy the place of the analyst because it has no lack of its own.

== Schools of thought ==
=== Gender theory ===
Judith Butler, Bracha L. Ettinger and Jane Gallop have used Lacanian work, though in a critical way, to develop gender theory.

== Criticism ==
=== Deleuzoguattarian ===
Gilles Deleuze and Félix Guattari, the latter a trained Lacanian analyst, launched a major attack on Lacanian psychoanalysis from within post-structuralism in Anti-Oedipus: Capitalism and Schizophrenia (1972). Frederick Crews writes that when they "indicted Lacanian psychoanalysis as a capitalist disorder" and "pilloried analysts as the most sinister priest-manipulators of a psychotic society" in Anti-Oedipus, their "demonstration was widely regarded as unanswerable" and "devastated the already shrinking Lacanian camp in Paris."

The Deleuzoguattarian critique of Lacanianism attacks its conception of desire as "negative", in that it results from a lack in the subject, and its belief that the unconscious mind is "structured like a language". Deleuze and Guattari argued that the unconscious mind was schizophrenic, characterised by rhizomes of libidinal investment, and that desire was a creative force that powered the essential building blocks of psychical structures, desiring-machines. The networks of signifiers to which so much weight is given in Lacanianism are structures created by desiring-machines, above the level of the unconscious. Hence, Lacanian analysis works to solve neurosis, but it fails to see that neuroses are a second-order problem that reveals nothing about the unconscious—as does Freud's classical psychoanalysis.

Deleuze and Guattari proposed an alternative post-structuralist extension of classical psychoanalysis, schizoanalysis, which was defined in opposition to these apparent flaws in Lacanianism. Unlike Lacanianism, schizoanalysis openly repudiates parts of Freud, particularly his neurotic conception of the unconscious, and Deleuze and Guattari insisted that it was distinct from psychoanalysis. Schizoanalysis was further elaborated on in A Thousand Plateaus (1980) and Guattari's individual work in the 1980s and early 90s.

=== Feminist ===
Elizabeth Grosz accuses Lacan of maintaining a sexist tradition in psychoanalysis.

Luce Irigaray accuses Lacan of perpetuating phallocentric mastery in philosophical and psychoanalytic discourse. Others have echoed this accusation, seeing Lacan as trapped in the very phallocentric mastery his language ostensibly sought to undermine. The result—Cornelius Castoriadis would maintain—was to make all thought depend upon himself, and thus to stifle the capacity for independent thought among all those around him.

== Notable Lacanians ==
- Alain Badiou
- Cornelius Castoriadis
- Joan Copjec
- Michel de Certeau
- Muriel Drazien
- Antoinette Fouque
- Julia Kristeva
- Serge Leclaire
- Maud Mannoni
- Octave Mannoni
- Christian Metz
- Jacques-Alain Miller
- François Perrier
- Jacqueline Rose
- Slavoj Žižek

== See also ==
- Aphanisis
- Four discourses
- Freudo-Marxism
- Male gaze
- Name of the Father
- Post-structural feminism
- Screen theory
- World Association of Psychoanalysis
