= José Bleger =

Jewish Argentine psychoanalyst and Marxist (1922-1977)

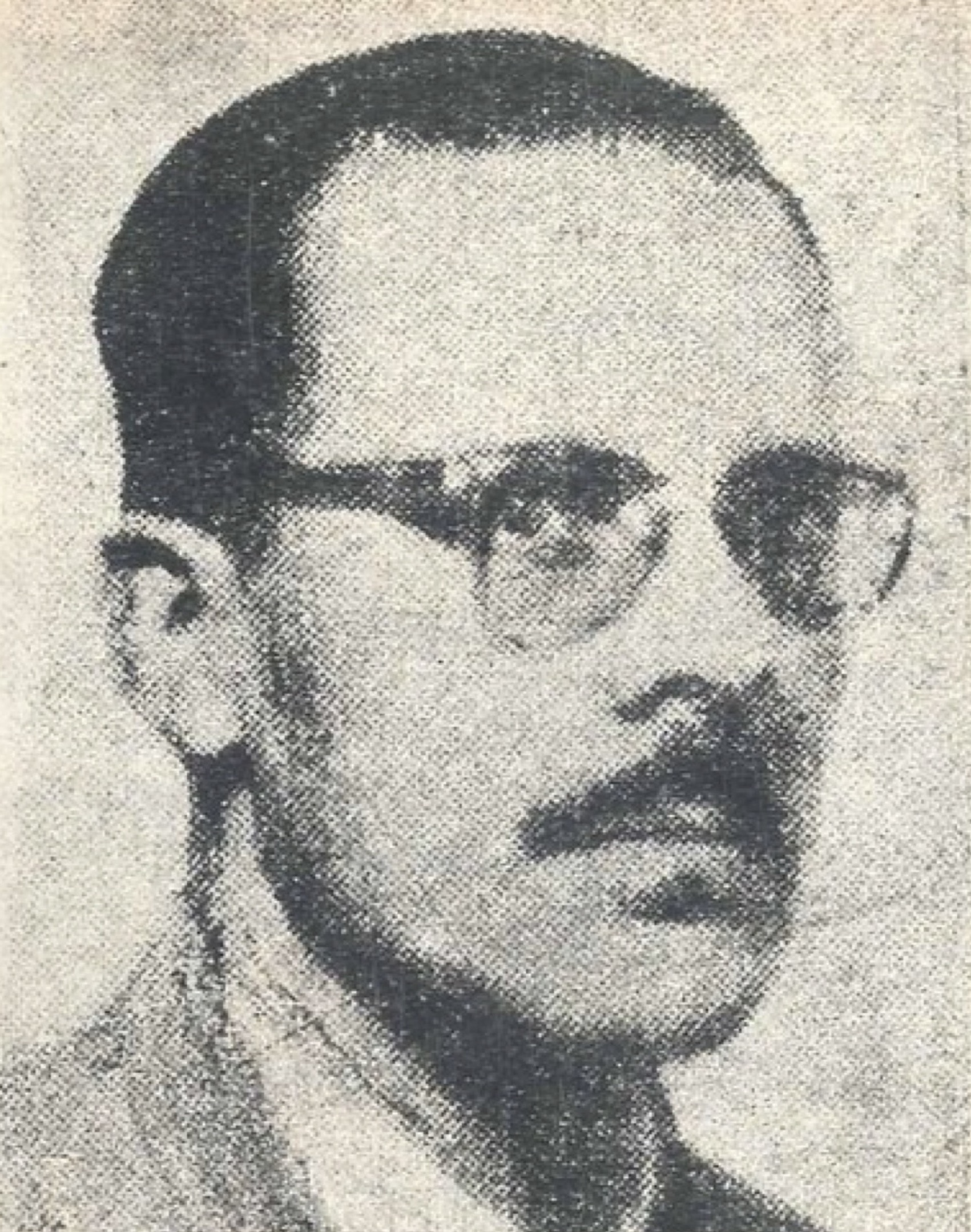
- Born: November 12, 1922; Ceres, Santa Fe Province, Argentina
- Died: June 20, 1972 (aged 49); Buenos Aires, Argentina
- Known for: Rapprochement of marxism and psychoanalysis; theory of symbiosis
- Partner: Lily Storch
- Children: Léopoldo Bleger; Juana Bleger
- Scientific career
- Fields: Psychoanalysis
- Workplaces: University of Buenos Aires; National University of Rosario

José Bleger (11 November 1922 – 20 June 1972) was an Argentine psychoanalyst. He sought a rapprochement of psychoanalysis and Marxism in works such as Psicoanálisis y dialéctica materialista ("Psychoanalysis and materialist dialectics", 1958). He also contributed to Kleinian clinical practice and thought.

== Biography ==
José Bleger was born in Ceres, in the province of Santa Fe, Argentina, in November 1922. His parents were Jewish immigrants, who belonged to the lower middle class.

He studied for a medical degree at the Faculty of Medicine of the Universidad Nacional de Rosario, as did his wife Lily Bleger (née Storch). It was under the influence of one of his teachers, Teodoro Fracassi, that he became interested in neurology. He concluded his training in 1946, specializing in neurology.

Around 1947 the Blegers moved to Santiago del Estero, and started to live in La Banda, one of the poorest districts of the province at the time. Bleger frequently left Santiago del Estero to receive training in other disciplines, such as reflexology, a Pavlovian form of psychology, which he was introduced to by the Russian emigrant Konstantin Gavrilov, in Tucumán. In Córdoba he visited the clinic of Communist psychiatrist Gregorio Bermann. The Blegers became increasingly interested in psychoanalysis, and began to commute to Buenos Aires to receive training, where they settled in 1954. In the early 1950s Bleger also joined the Communist Party of Argentina. He was eventually ousted from the party over his work on psychoanalysis and Marxism, as well as his rejection of the Soviet Union's model of communism in the late 50s. He subsequently became a leftist Zionist.

Bleger's psychoanalytic training was shaped by Enrique J. Pichon-Riviére. Beginning in 1958 Bleger started to teach psychology at the Universidad de Buenos Aires (UBA), and at the Universidad Nacional de Rosario. In 1962 he became a professor of mental hygiene at the UBA, and continued to practice as a psychoanalyst in Buenos Aires until his death on June 20, 1972. He died of cardiac arrest.

== Work ==
Central points of reference for Bleger were Hegel, Marx, Sartre, Klein, and Georges Politzer. Bleger sought to think psychoanalysis, Marxism, and Jewishness together. During his time he was often assailed for his adherence to Marxism and psychoanalysis by members of the Argentine Communist Party or the Argentine Psychoanalytic Association (APA).

=== Marxism and psychoanalysis ===
Bleger utilized Politzer's concept of "drama" in order to think together psychoanalysis and Marxism. Bleger tried to think psychoanalysis as a materialist science, devoid of epistemological idealism. He argued that inner life has to be understood as part of the totality of social existence.

=== Clinical contributions ===
Bleger's clinical investigations revolve around the phenomenon of symbiosis. His work is an extension of Kleinian metapsychology, and in constant dialogue with its central figures, such as Bion, Rosenfeld, or Klein herself.

==== The glischro-caric position ====
Bleger proposes a third position, the glischro-caric position. This position precedes the paranoid-schizoid position. The term's two components are the Greek words for viscous (γλισχροσ) and for kernel or nucleus (καρυον). Symbiosis is a form of primitive undifferentation between mother and child. The paranoid-schizoid position is a dissociation from the mother.

Bleger distinguishes ambiguity, divalence, and ambivalence. Ambivalence marks the arrival of the depressive position, divalence is the state of mind that characterizes the paranoid-schizoid position, while ambiguity is characteristic of the glischro-caric position.

The glischro-caric position is characterized by "an agglutinated object relation, catastrophic anxiety, and defences such as splitting, projection and immobilization, functioning with maximum intensity, massivity and violence."

The paranoid-schizoid position is reached through "progressive fragmentation and discrimination inside the agglutinated object, which coincides with a gradation of splitting and projection." Eventually, the infant becomes capable of projection and introjection. Dissociation belongs to the paranoid-schizoid position, while splitting takes place in the glischro-caric position. There is a process directed against the agglutinated object, which has different names in different metapsychologies. Bion terms it "splitting", Rosenfeld "abnormal splitting", Bleuer – at its maximum levels – Zerspaltung; Bleger speaks of clivaje. Bion's dissociation corresponds to Bleuer's Spaltung and to Rosenfeld's "normal splitting".

Summary table of the different positions
Position	Anxiety	Object	Defences	Point of Fixation
Depressive	Depressive	Total (Ambivalent)	Manic	Manic-Depressive Psychosis
Paranoid-Schizoid	Paranoid	Partial (Divalent)	Division	Schizophrenia
Glischro-Caric	Confusional	Agglutinated Nucleus (Ambiguous)	Splitting, Immbolisation, Fragmentation	Confusional States, Epilepsy

==== Symbiosis ====
Bleger defines symbiosis as "a close interdependence between two or more persons who complement each other in order to keep the needs of the most immature parts of the personality controlled, immobilised and to some extent satisfied." These parts survive in the adult's psychotic core as the aggutinated nucleus. It is as such a remnant of the glischro-caric position. This nucleus is ambiguous and polyvalent, and is marked by fusion (not confusion). The schizoid division introduces discrimination into this nucleus. It transforms "confusion into contradiction and ambiguity into conflict."

==== Ambiguity ====
Ambiguity is a form of primitive undifferentiation. Undifferentation is not something negative. It has a specific structure and organisation. Ambiguity is part of the primitive mental situation, and is overcome through various forms of projective identifications, for which Bleger frequently uses the term "depositary" and "deposited", a distinction he borrows from Enrique Rivière.

It can be characteristic of various personality types, including that of the infant; the authoritarian personality; people incapable of splitting; dreams, paradoxes, aesthetics.

==== Technique ====
In the clinical setting the nucleus appears as part of a psychotic transference, in which the analysand seeks to symbiotically merge with the analyst through massive projective identification. The countertransference reaction is feeling overwhelmed, "crushing global feelings", guilt, and a tendency to overwhelm the patient. Part of clinical technique consists in discovering the psychotic core in neurosis. In a second step, the patient needs to establish discrimination of the nuclei's different parts. Through this, psychosis becomes neurosis.

Bleger distinguishes two types of interpretations: split and unsplit. These interpretations make it possible to "handle the timing and mobilisation of the psychotic part of the personality." Introjections and projections, the frequent dealing with objects, eventually introduces discrimination into the nucleus.

The analysis of the core requires mobilisation, fragmentation and discrimination. The editors explain:

Mobilisation because the symbiotic transference implies immobilisation of important parts of the personality; fragmentation because these parts tend to function in a massive (quasi-psychotic) way; and discrimination because the elements are undifferentiated. All three steps depend on the capacity of the analyst to introduce a split between himself and what is deposited in him. The agglutinated nucleus has to be 'broken up' before discrimination and schizoid division will be possible.

==== The clinical framework ====
One of Bleger's most famous clinical texts is his Psicoanálisis del encuadre psicoanalítico ("Psychoanalysis of the psychoanalytic setting"), a paper that first appeared in 1958, as part of his book Psicoanálisis y dialéctica materialista ("Psychoanalysis and materialist dialectics").

== Reception ==
Although well known in the Latin American world of psychoanalysis, Bleger was until 2010 virtually unknown among European or American psychoanalysts.

== Bibliography ==
- Teoría y práctica del narcoanálisis, with Teodoro Fracassi (Buenos Aires: El Ateneo, 1952)
- Psicoanálisis y dialéctica materialista: estudios sobre la estructura del psicoanálisis (Buenos Aires: Paidos, 1958)
- Psicología de la conducta (Buenos Aires: Eudeba, 1963)
- Simbiosis y ambiguedad. Estudio psicoanalitico (Buenos Aires: Paidos, 1967)
  - Symbiosis and Ambiguity: A Psychoanalytic Study, edited by John Churcher and Léopoldo Bleger; translated by John Churcher, Léopoldo Bleger and Susan Rogers (London and New York: Routledge, 2013)
- Temas de psicología: entrevista y grupo (Buenos Aires: Nueva Vision, 1979)
- Psicohigiene y psicología institucional (Buenos Aires: Paidos, 1986)
