= Serge Leclaire =

French psychiatrist and psychoanalyst

Serge Leclaire (French: [ləklɛʁ]; born Serge Liebschutz; 6 July 1924 – 8 August 1994) was a French psychiatrist and psychoanalyst. Initially analyzed by Jacques Lacan, he 'became the first French "Lacanian"'.

Subsequently, he developed into 'one of the most respected and distinguished of all French analysts'.

== Early life and education ==
Leclaire was born in 1924 in Strasbourg into a Jewish family under the name "Liebschutz", his family changed their name in wartime to escape persecution. Initially interested in Eastern philosophy, he then turned to psychoanalysis and studied medicine and psychiatry in Paris (where he met Wladimir Granoff). He successfully defended his medical dissertation in 1957.

== Career ==
At the start of the fifties, Lacan 'was beginning to gather around him the most brilliant members of the third generation of French psychoanalysis. Among them were the musketeers of the future troika: Serge Leclaire, Wladimir Granoff, and Francois Perrier'. All three followed Lacan into the Société Française de Psychanalyse during the 1953 split.

There Leclaire 'was made an associate member in 1954 and served as secretary from 1957 to 1962. He became president of the society in 1963, the year of the second split of the French psychoanalytic groups'. He was also, between 1961 and 1965, a member of the International Psychoanalytical Association (IPA).

Leclaire believed passionately that 'any break between Lacan and the IPA would be a calamity at once for Freudianism in France, for Lacan, and for the IPA', and worked tirelessly to prevent one on Lacan's behalf. He was ultimately unsuccessful, and indeed Lacan, despite the way 'Leclaire kept him informed of every important development' eventually 'accused Leclaire of betraying him'. Notwithstanding, Leclaire followed Lacan into the École Freudienne de Paris, founded in 1964, but continued to work on the unification of French psychoanalysis.

In 1969, Leclaire was the originator of the first Department of Psychoanalysis at the University of Paris VIII (Vincennes), a project first opposed and then taken over by Lacan. After the latter's death, and the disintegration of the Lacanian movement, 'Serge Leclaire had refused to found a school; he wanted to give the younger generation a chance. But ten years later he made a great come-back on the French psychoanalytic scene' in an attempt to reunify the fragmented Lacanians. '"His initiative triggered things off. To begin with, everyone was against the founding of an order...But his analysis of the situation was accurate"'.

'Because of his unique position and his intellectual openness, he was able to maintain friendly relations with numerous colleagues from different schools in spite of splits and divisions'.

He died in Argentière.

== Writings ==
In the fifties, Leclaire's writings might at times come close to the parody-picture whereby 'Lacanians mirror the master...a Lacanian ventriloquist's dummy' On fantasy, 'Serge Leclaire, who is summarizing Lacan's thinking on the fantasm in the late 1950s, points out that the fantasm is at the heart of the dream' in orthodox Lacanian fashion. Similarly orthodox is his 1959 study of the obsessional "Philo", where he stresses that 'the psychoanalysts must...introduce a cleavage between demand and desire, between the world of the law and that of the dream'; and, on the role of the father, that 'this third person, the father, appears especially as a being to whom one refers (to honor or to scorn)...as to a law'.

When preparing to present his famous analysis of the dream of the Unicorn with Jean Laplanche at the Symposium of Bonneval in 1960, the two disciples found themselves in disagreement, and 'this difference of opinion severely disturbed Leclaire', still very much the good pupil. Lacan indeed referred 'to what my pupil Leclaire contributed, at the Congres de Bonneval, by way of an application of my theses....'Leclaire's work illustrates particularly well the crossing of significant interpretation towards signifying non-sense...thus enabling him to introduce into his sequence a whole chain in which his desire is animated'.

In his subsequent book Psychoanalyzing, Leclaire 'emphasizes that he interprets the desire to drink not physically but psychically' in the unicorn dream: '"Li" is the signifier that leads from "Lili" to "lolo" to "licorne" [unicorn]...these puns extend from infantile oral desire to adult genital desire'. Similarly centred on the signifier is his work on erotogenicity. 'The erotogenic body, he proposes, is a symbolic or represented body': 'erogeneity depends closely on the "sexual value" projected onto the child's body by another'.

By the start of the seventies, however, Lacan was increasingly turning from his old doctrines of the signifier and the Symbolic, in favour of new mathematical formulations, and 'despite many attempts, especially by Serge Leclaire, to maintain links between the majority of clinicians in the EFP' and the new approach, a gulf with his old master inevitably loomed. Indeed, by 1975 Leclaire concluded publicly 'that whilst the mathemes might have a certain pedagogic utility, they were basically no more than "graffiti"'. As 'Lacan had a hard time tolerating the autonomy of his pupils', not least with 'Serge Leclaire, the most senior of the group', despite the latter's continuing personal loyalty, the two men inevitably drifted apart.

It is then perhaps not surprising that much of Leclaire's later work addresses questions of autonomy and its stages - 'The goal of the analysis does, as Serge Leclaire used to say, depend on our ability to speak in the first person...but only after we have spoken in the third person' - and of the problems of finding a distinctive voice.

In A Child is Being Killed, he argued that 'in order to achieve full selfhood we must all repeatedly and endlessly kill the phantasmatic image of ourselves installed in us by our parents..."primary narcissism", a projection of the child our parents wanted'.

== See also ==
- Julia Kristeva
- Daniel Lagache
- Lacanian movement
- Psychoanalytic theory
- True self and false self
