= World Association of Psychoanalysis =

- Formation: 1992
- Founder: Jacques-Alain Miller
- Type: Nonprofit
- Headquarters: Paris
- President: Christiane Alberti
- Affiliations: Lacanian
- Website: www.wapol.org/en/Template.asp

The World Association of Psychoanalysis (WAP) is an organisation dedicated to promoting the development of psychoanalysis worldwide. Using the teachings of French psychoanalyst Jacques Lacan as its guide, WAP was the brainchild of his student and son-in-law Jacques-Alain Miller, who, after recruiting other cofounders, announced its formation in Buenos Aires on 3 January 1992. An official declaration of its founding came in Paris four days later. Its statutes are modelled on Lacan's "Founding Act" and adopt the principles outlined in his "Proposition" about Lacan's concept of the Pass.

== Structure ==
With 1,986 members worldwide, and more in affiliated groups, the WAP stands as the largest institutional structure dedicated to the training of psychoanalysts in the Lacanian orientation. It consists of seven fully-functioning Schools:

Four European schools which together form the EuroFédération de Psychanalyse:

- The École de la cause freudienne, in France, founded in January 1981
- The Scuola Lacaniana di Psicoanalisi del Campo Freudiano, in Italy, founded in May 2002
- The Escuela Lacaniana de Psicoanálisis del Campo Freudiano, in Spain, founded in May 2000
- The New Lacanian School, in various European countries and the US, founded in May 2003

Three American Schools which together form the Federación Americana de la Orientación Lacaniana:

- The Escuela de la Orientación Lacaniana, in Argentina, founded in January 1992 alongside the WAP
- The Escola Brasileira de Psicanalise, in Brazil, founded in April 1995
- The Nueva Escuela Lacaniana; which includes Peru, Ecuador, Venezuela, Cuba, Columbia, Guatemala, Mexico, and Chile; founded in July 2000

== Presidents ==
- Jacques-Alain Miller (1992–2002)
- Graciela Brodsky (2002–2006)
- Éric Laurent (2006–2010)
- Leonardo Gorostiza (2010–2014)
- Miquel Bassols (2014–2018)
- Angelina Harari (2018–2022)
- Christiane Alberti (2022– )

== International congresses ==
In 1994 and 1996, the members of the WAP met in "assemblies". Since 1998, the international meetings have taken the form of congresses.

Number	Year	City	President	Theme
1	1998	Barcelona	Jacques-Alain Miller
2	2000	Buenos Aires	Jacques-Alain Miller
3	2002	Brussels	Jacques-Alain Miller	"Training-Effects in Psychoanalysis: their Site, Causes, and Paradoxes"
4	2004	Comandatuba	Graciela Brodsky	"The Lacanian Practice of Psychoanalysis: without Standards but not without Principles"
5	2006	Rome	Graciela Brodsky	"The Name-of-the-Father; Going without it, Making Use of it"
6	2008	Buenos Aires	Éric Laurent	"The Objects a in the Psychoanalytic Experience"
7	2010	Paris	Éric Laurent	"Semblants and Sinthome"
8	2012	Buenos Aires	Leonardo Gorostiza	"The Symbolic Order in the Twenty-First Century: What are the Consequences for the Direction of the Treatment?"
9	2014	Paris	Leonardo Gorostiza	"A Real for the Twenty-First Century"
10	2016	Rio de Janeiro	Miquel Bassos	"The Speaking Body: The Unconscious in the 21st Century"
11	2018	Barcelona	Miquel Bassos	"The Ordinary Psychoses and the Others, under Transference”
12/13	2022	Online	Angelina Harari	"Woman Does Not Exist"
14	2024	Online	Christiane Alberti	"Everyone is Mad"

Preparatory texts for the congresses are published in Scilicet.
