= Didier Anzieu =

French psychoanalyst (1923–1999)

- Born: 8 July 1923; Melun, France
- Died: 25 November 1999 (aged 76); Paris, France
- Occupation: Psychoanalyst

Didier Anzieu (French: [didje ɑ̃zjø]; 8 July 1923 – 25 November 1999) was a distinguished French psychoanalyst.

== Life ==
Anzieu studied philosophy and was a pupil of Daniel Lagache, before undertaking his first psychoanalysis with Jacques Lacan. Then, after discovering that Lacan had also treated his mother ("Aimée"), he began a second analysis with Georges Favez. He retained a deep grudge against Lacan's lack of candor and later also condemned the excesses and arbitrary practices of the Lacanians — highlighting the latter's 'unending dependence on an idol, a logic, or a language', as well as the pervasively tantalizing element in Lacan's approach, with 'fundamental truths to be revealed...but always at some further point'.

Among Anzieu's many significant contributions to psychoanalysis were his work on Freud's self-analysis and his extensive study of groups, relying in particular on the work of Wilfred Ruprecht Bion. Building on the writings of such psychoanalysts as Melanie Klein and Heinz Kohut, Anzieu also sought with great skill to analyze, not so much works of art, but the creative process itself; and he published numerous works on literary creation (Pascal, Beckett) and artistic creation (Bacon)'.

Perhaps the most telling strand in his writings, however, was that of the so-called Skin-Ego, and the related concept of the "Psychic Envelope".

== On Freud's "self-analysis" ==
Anzieu's Freud's Self-Analysis (2d ed., 1975; tr. Peter Graham, 1986) is a detailed study of Freud's early life as mirrored in the dreams he chose to recount and analyze in The Interpretation of Dreams. From a Kleinian viewpoint, Anzieu considered Freud's 'elaboration of psychoanalytic theory ... corresponded to a setting up of obsessional defences against depressive anxiety'—emphasising Freud's need to 'defend himself against it through such a degree of intellectualisation'.

== On creativity ==
'Anzieu explores the connections between clinical analysis and self-analysis...and the relationship between self-analysis and creativity'. He also highlights the role of inner resistance to creativity: 'resistance consists of a searing and demoralising doubt as to the value of what we are in the process of discovering'.

== On psychic envelopes ==
Emerging from ideas held by writers such as Marion Milner and Donald Winnicott, and then 'migrating into Continental psychoanalysis, the idea of the skin-container takes on a life of its own...shap[ing] Didier Anzieu's concept of the psychic envelope in The Skin-Ego (Le Moi-peau)'.

'Didier Anzieu (1985) theorized on the skin-ego, the first narcissistic envelope on which the feeling of well-being is based', suggesting for example that 'narcissistic personalities...possess an unusually thick skin ego; in contrast, masochistic and borderline personalities show remarkably thin skin ego'.

Anzieu would extend the concept to a broader notion of "psychic envelope", exploring for example the idea of 'the dream envelope. This is the name Didier Anzieu gives to the visual dream-film, the fine, ephemeral membrane which he thinks of as replacing the tactile envelope of the ego's vulnerable skin'.

'With his development of a related concept, the "sound envelope" Anzieu articulates the bodily ego's relation to psychic space in terms of breath'.

In terms of groups, Anzieu also maintained that 'there is no group without a common skin, a containing envelope, which makes it possible for its members to experience the existence of a group self'.

== Criticism ==
'For a critique of Anzieu's "interpretatively versatile" pan-pellicularism and his therapeutically oriented model of the skin-container, see Steven Connor, The Book of Skin (London...2004)'.

'Kaja Silverman argues that the emphasis by Anzieu and others (including Kristeva) on the maternal voice as sound envelope "grows out of a powerful cultural fantasy...the image of a child held within the environment or sphere of the mother's voice"'.
