= Jean-Bertrand Pontalis =

French philosopher

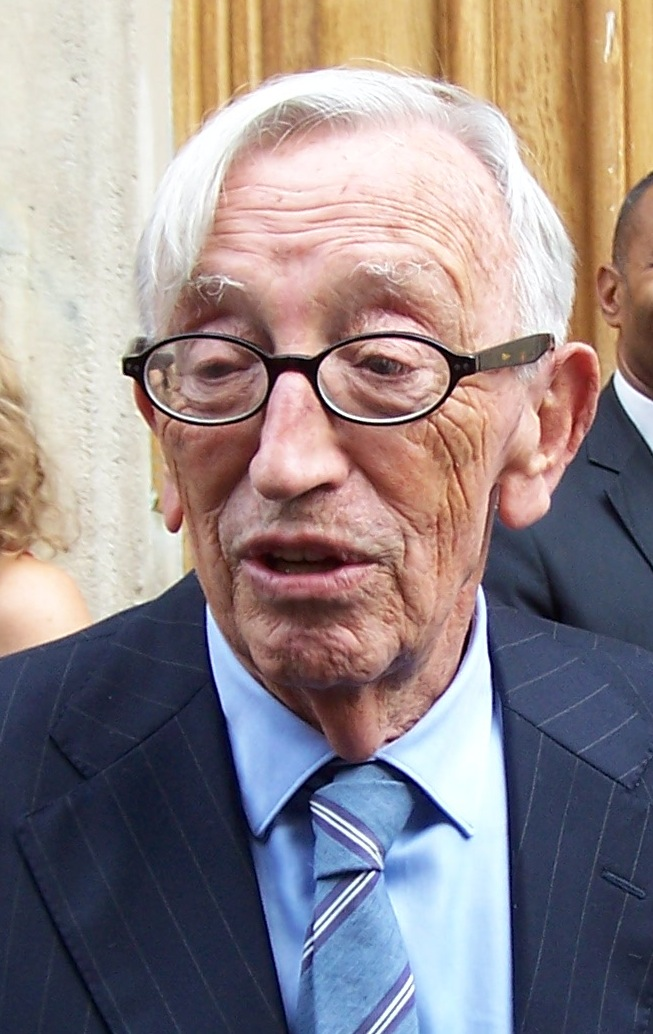
Jean-Bertrand Pontalis in 2011

Jean-Bertrand Lefèvre-Pontalis (French: [pɔ̃talis]; 15 January 1924, Paris – 15 January 2013, Paris) was a French philosopher, writer, editor and psychoanalyst.

== Career ==
A student of Jean-Paul Sartre, Pontalis became a professor of philosophy in the 1940s, before undergoing an analysis with his associate Jacques Lacan the following decade. He was, however, one of the minority group of disciples/analysands who did not follow Lacan into the École Freudienne de Paris, but rather stayed within the legitimist sphere as founding members of the Association Psychanalytique de France, of which he later became president.

Together with Jean Laplanche, he wrote the influential work The Language of Psychoanalysis in 1967; while among his later, more literary writings were Windows and Crossing the Shadows.

His 1993 autobiography, Love of Beginnings, was deliberately ahistorical, emphasising what he called "holes" in discourse, where the process of slipping through or evading set formats and ways of thinking opened up new beginnings: "When words fail, it is because, without realising it, one is about to touch a different earth".

== See also ==
- Jacques Derrida
- Maud Mannoni
- Serge Leclaire
