= André Bourguignon =

French psychiatrist (1920–1996)

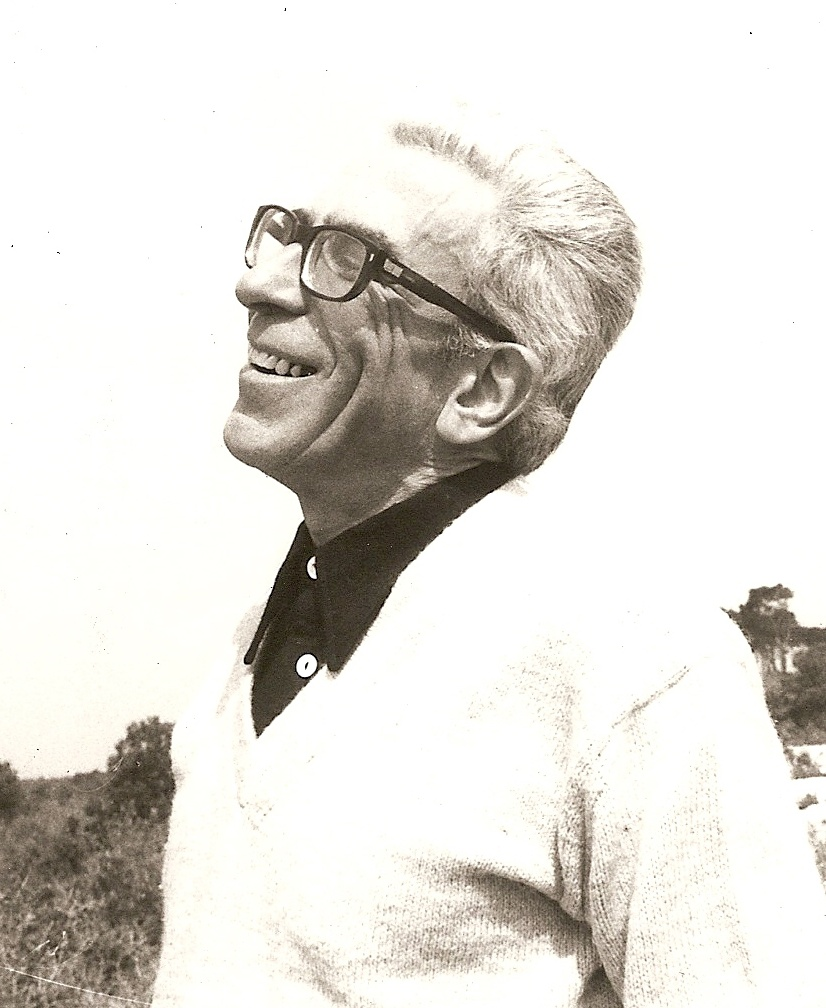
André Bourguignon in 1975.

André Bourguignon (8 August 1920 – 9 April 1996) was a French psychiatrist and psychoanalyst, born in Paris.

A psychiatry professor at the University of Paris XII, he was part of a team in charge of translating Sigmund Freud's work from German into French, together with Jean Laplanche, Pierre Cotet and François Robert.

He was the father of actress Anémone.
