= André Green (psychoanalyst) =

French psychoanalyst (1927–2012)

- Born: 12 May 1927; Cairo, Kingdom of Egypt
- Died: 22 January 2012 (aged 84); Paris, France
- Spouse: Litza Guttieres-Green

André Green (French: [ɑ̃dʁe ɡʁin]; 12 March 1927 – 22 January 2012) was a French psychoanalyst.

== Life and career ==
André Green was born in Cairo, Egypt, to non-observant Jewish parents. He studied medicine (specialising in psychiatry) at Paris Medical School and worked at several hospitals. In 1965, after having finished his training as a psychoanalyst, he became a member of the Paris Psychoanalytic Society (SPP), of which he was the president from 1986 to 1989. From 1975 to 1977 he was a vice president of the International Psychoanalytical Association and from 1979 to 1980 he was a professor at University College London. He died at age 84 in Paris.

André Green was the author of numerous papers and books on the theory and practice of psychoanalysis, and the psychoanalytic criticism of culture and literature; many of these works have been translated into English.

== Intellectual development ==
=== Encounter with Lacan ===
In the early 1960s, Green attended Jacques Lacan's seminars without abandoning his affiliation to the SPP - a bold decision which for some time enabled him to straddle the competing strands of French psychoanalysis from an independent position. As the decade progressed however, he moved further from Lacan, and finally broke with the latter in 1970 by criticising his concept of the signifier for its neglect of affect.

By doing so, he replaced the SPP's normally defensive approach towards Lacanianism with a direct theoretical confrontation. Green points out that whereas "Lacan is saying that the unconscious is structured like a language ... when you read Freud, it is obvious that this proposition doesn't work for a minute. Freud very clearly opposes the unconscious (which he says is constituted by thing-presentations and nothing else) to the pre-conscious. What is related to language can only belong to the pre-conscious."

In his later work Green would become increasingly hostile toward the Lacanian school, disparaging it as being not far from a Stalinist cult of personality. He also opined that the substance of Lacanian thinking itself was severely limited if one separated it from the "drivel", surrounding it.

=== The Greenian synthesis ===
Over the decades since, R. Horacio Etchegoyen concluded that what he called "the complex itinerary of Andre Green's prolific work" has continued to demonstrate the intellectually independent way in which "Green is a Freudian analyst who has managed to integrate in a lucid synthesis the influence of authors as diverse as Lacan, Bion, and, especially, Winnicott".

The result was to make André Green the creator of what has been called a Greenian theory of psychoanalysis (Kohon, 1999). Building on Freudian metapsychology, Green elaborated a further theory of the unrepresentable, relating thinking to absence as well as to sexuality.

While containing a multiplicity of local contributions - on the central phobic position; subjective disengagement; unconscious recognition; the dead mother; and more - the Greenian psychoanalytic framework has been seen as a totality, producing something greater than the sum of its parts.

== Theoretical contributions ==
=== On the work of the negative ===
A significant part of Green's contribution to contemporary psychoanalysis has centred on his exploration of 'the different modalities of the work of the negative'. He has highlighted the way 'accepting the negation of what was there is necessary for relationships to new things to become possible' - the way that 'to accept the reality of lack...opens the door, through a process of working-through, to new experience, new ideals and new object-relationships'.

=== On the analytic setting ===
For Green, the analytic setting is in itself a recreation of psychic reality, Michael Parsons proposes, quoting the early Green:

The symbolism of the setting comprises a triangular paradigm, uniting the three polarities of the dream (narcissism), of maternal caring (from the mother, following Winnicott), and of the prohibition of incest (from the father, following Freud). What the psychoanalytic apparatus gives rise to, then, is the symbolisation of the unconscious structure of the Oedipus Complex.

=== On dreams ===
Mary Jacobus argues that for André Green, dreams are "negative states trying to accede to symbolization." In addition, she invokes Adam Phillips, who writes, "Dreams and affects, and states of emptiness or absence have been the essential perplexities of Green's work because they are the areas of experience...in which the nature of representation itself is put at risk."

=== Moral narcissism ===
Green saw moral narcissism as the attempt to elevate oneself above ordinary human needs and attachments - an ascetic attempt at creating an impregnable sense of moral superiority.

== Bibliography ==
=== Books ===
==== In French ====
- Un œil en trop. Le complexe d'Oedipe dans la tragédie, Les Éditions de Minuit (1969)
- L'enfant de ça. Pour introduire une psychose blanche, Les Éditions de Minuit (1973)
- Le discours vivant: la conception psychoanalytique de l'affect, PUF, "Quadrilege" (1973)
- Narcissisme de vie, narcissisme de mort, Les Éditions de Minuit (1983)
- Le langage dans la psychanalyse, 250p, in Langages. Deuxièmes Rencontres psychanalytiques d'Aix-en-Provence, 1983, Les Belles Lettres (1984)
- La folie privée: psychanalyse de cas-limites, Gallimard (1990)
- Le complexe de castration, PUF, "Que sais-je?" (1990)
- La déliaison: psychanalyse, anthropologie et littérature, Les Belles Lettres (1992)
- Révélations de l'inachèvement. À propos du carton de Londres de Léonard de Vinci, Flammarion (1992)
- Le travail du négatif, Les Éditions de Minuit (1993)
- Un psychanalyste engagé. Conversations avec Manuel Marcias, Calman-Lévy (1994)
- La causalité psychique: entre nature et culture, Odile Jacob (1995)
- Propédeutique. La métapsychologie revisitée, Champ Vallon (1995)
- Les Chaînes d'Éros: actualité du sexuel, Odile Jacob (1997)
- La diachronie en psychanalyse, Les Éditions de Minuit (2000)
- Le temps éclaté, Les Éditions de Minuit (2000)
- Méconnaissance et reconnaissance de l'inconscient. Idées directrices pour une psychanalyse contemporaine, PUF (2002)
- La pensée clinique, Odile Jacob (2002)
- Hamlet et hamlet: une interprétation psychanalytique de la représentation, PUF (2003)
- La lettre et la mort. Promenade d'un psychanalyste à travers la litterature: Proust, Shakespeare, Conrad, Borges, Entretiens avec Dominique Eddé, Denoel (2004)
- Jouer avec Winnicott, PUF, translation by Martine Lussier (2004)
- Sortilèges de la séduction: lectures critiques du Songe d'une nuit d'été; Antoine et Cléopâtre; La Tempête; Le Phénix et la Colombe de William Shakespeare, Odile Jacob (2005)
- Associations (presque) libres d'un psychanalyste, entretiens avec Maurice Corcos, Albin Michel (2006)
- Pourquoi les pulsions de destruction ou de mort?, Éditions du Panama (2007)
- Joseph Conrad: le premier commandement, Éditions In Press (2008)
- L'aventure négative. Lecture psychanalytique d'Henry James, Éditions Hermann (2009)
- Illusions et désillusions du travail psychanalytique, Odile Jacob (2010)
- Du signe au discours. Psychanalyse et théories du langage, Ithaque (2011)
- La clinique psychanalytique contemporaine, Ithaque (2012)
- Penser la psychanalyse avec Bion, Lacan, Winnicott, Laplanche, Aulagnier, Anzieu, Rosolato, Ithaque (2013)
- La Clinique du négatif. Narcissisme, destructivité et dépression, Ithaque (2022)

==== In English ====
- The Work of the Negative by Andre Green, Andrew Weller (Translator), Publisher: Free Association Books, 1999, ISBN 1-85343-470-1
- On Private Madness, Publisher: International Universities Press, 1997, ISBN 0-8236-3853-7
- The Chains of Eros, Publisher: Karnac Books, 2002, ISBN 1-85575-960-8
- Psychoanalysis: A Paradigm For Clinical Thinking Publisher: Free Association Books, 2005, ISBN 1-85343-773-5
- Life narcissism, death narcissism London: Free Association Books 2001, ISBN 1-85343-530-9
- Key ideas for a contemporary psychoanalysis. Misrecognition and recognition of the unconscious. London: Routledge, 2005. ISBN 1-58391-838-8
- 'A Dual Conception of Narcissism: Positive and Negative Organizations', (2002). Psychoanalytic Quarterly, 71:631-649
- The Fabric of Affect in the Psychoanalytic Discourse, The New Library of Psychoanalysis, London and NY, 1999, ISBN 0-415-11525-6

=== Edited volumes ===
- L'avenir d'une désillusion, PUF, 2000 (with Otto Kernberg)
- Courants de la psychanalyse contemporaine, PUF, 2001
- Le travail psychanalytique, PUF, 2003
