= Société Française de Psychanalyse =

French psychoanalytic professional body

The Société Française de Psychanalyse (SFP; English: "French Society of Psychoanalysis") was a French psychoanalytic professional body formed in 1953, in a split from the main body of French psychoanalysts, the Société Parisienne de Psychanalyse (SPP).

The SFP effectively disbanded in November 1963, its resources and membership being split between the two new bodies, the Association Psychanalytique de France (APF, founded May 1964), and the École Freudienne de Paris (EFP, founded June 1964), founded by Jacques Lacan. The formal dissolution of SFP was in January 1965.

== Foundation ==
The early 1950s were a time of growing disagreements within the SPP, mainly centred on the question of the training of analysts. Despite wishing himself to avoid a split, Lacan was drawn into the dissident movement led by Daniel Lagache, as a result of his own separate dispute with the president Sacha Nacht over his practice of "short sessions".

After a year of disagreements and a vote of no confidence, five members of the SPP resigned from the body in June 1953. These five were Lacan, Lagache, Dolto, Favez-Boutonnier and Reverchon-Jouve.

Unfortunately, an unexpected by-product of the split was to deprive the new group, who termed themselves the Société Française de Psychanalyse (SFP), of membership of the International Psychoanalytical Association (IPA), to which they now had to seek out affiliation.

== Affiliation ==
Over the following years, a complex process of negotiation was to take place to determine the status of the SFP within the IPA. Lacan’s practice, with his controversial innovation of variable-length sessions, and the critical stance he took towards much of the accepted orthodoxy of psychoanalytic theory and practice was a central stumbling-block to recognition of the new society.

Eventually, in August 1963, a condition was set by the IPA that the registration of the SFP was dependent upon Lacan being removed from the list of training analysts with the organisation: as he himself put it, “this affiliation is to be accepted only if a guarantee is given that my teaching may never again be sanctioned by the Association as far as the training of analysts is concerned”.

Lacan refused such a condition and left the SFP together with many of its members in June 1964 to set up the EFP independently of the IPA. The remaining membership of the SFP, including many of Lacan's own pupils such as Jean Laplanche, were to be recognised by the IPA the following year as part of a new body, the APF.

== Outcome ==
Élisabeth Roudinesco concluded that "the 1963-4 break was as disastrous for the IPA as it was for the development of Lacanianism”.

== See also ==
- Lacanian movement
- Serge Leclaire
