= Maud Mannoni =

French psychoanalyst

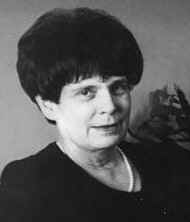
Maud Mannoni in 1975

Maud Mannoni (French: [mod manɔni]; born Magdalena Van der Spoel; 23 October 1923 – 15 March 1998) was a French psychoanalyst of Belgian origin, who married Octave Mannoni and became a major figure of the Lacanian movement.

== Life ==
She was born as Magdalena Van der Spoel in the Belgian city of Kortrijk, but spent her early childhood in Ceylon. After studying criminology at Brussels University, she began a training analysis with one of the pioneering Belgian psychoanalysts, Maurice Dugautiez. Thereafter she moved to France in 1949, where she married Octave Mannoni. While in Paris, she made contact with Françoise Dolto, and had further analysis with Jacques Lacan, supporting him during the 1953 split, and again after that of 1963, along with her husband Octave, Serge Leclaire, and Jean Clavreul.

== On the backward child ==
Lacan, in the first of his seminars to be published, singled out "our colleague Maud Mannoni, [with] a book that has just come out and which I would recommend you to read...The Retarded Child and the Mother". In that book she concludes that the subnormal patient has not been able to separate his or her ego from the mother. Instead, a kind of symbiosis takes place: the roots of such psychoses, in the words of the Lacanian Bernard Touati, "are inscribed in the maternal unconscious, with the psychotic child being unrecognised as a desiring subject...and frozen as partial object subjected to maternal omnipotence".

From 1964, and the launch of the Lacanian movement onwards, Mannoni began to have a revolutionary influence on an entire generation in France—parents, teachers, child therapists, and analysts alike—through her work.

She died in Paris.

== The child's speech ==
Mannoni drew a distinction between what she called parole pleine and parole vide—full and empty speech—in relation to the language of the child. Empty speech refers to the language of a child saturated by the symbols of parental knowledge, as opposed to 'full speech'—spoken from the heart. Linking her analysis to Alice Miller's view of the over-dutiful child, Mannoni argued that "the subject of the words is not necessarily the child", being particularly concerned with how an emotionally engulfing parent prevents the child from owning and inhabiting his or her own experience.

Every child, she points out, is born into a pre-existing parental discourse; and in certain circumstances the alienating burden of parental expectation can block a child's sense of entitlement to its own speech—its own life.

== Support centres and anti-psychiatry ==
Mannoni specialised in mental illness in children, and in 1969 established the school of Bonneuil-sur-Marne, a community live-in project for children with autism and psychosis. In doing so, she has been described as "profoundly influenced by the antipsychiatry of R. D. Laing and D. Cooper", an influence which can also be seen perhaps in her view of the child as the dysfunctional family's spokesperson. Until it was reformed as a day hospital in 1975, Bonneuil would be a leading institutional influence, known for its wide variety of therapeutic methods and its disregard for traditional boundaries.

Mannoni was also instrumental in establishing LVA—"A Place to Live and Hospitality"—small medico-social support centres of which there were 446 by 2007.

== Wider influences ==
After Lacan's death, and the fragmentation of the Lacanian movement, Mannoni, who had kept her membership of the IPA through the Belgian society, was able to play something of a unifying role, rather like that of Leclaire.

Her unique synthesis of Lacanian theories with those of Winnicott meant that such new perspectives on child development could be brought into much wider prominence.

== Literary explorations ==
Mannoni saw in the early death of Poe's mother, and his exposure to her corpse, the key to the Dark Romanticism of all his subsequent writings.

== Bibliography ==
- Maud Mannoni, Le Psychiatre, son "fou", et le Psychanalyse (Paris 1970).
- Maud Mannoni, Amour, Haine, Séparation (Paris 1993).

== See also ==
- Narcissistic abuse
- Parentification
