= Jean Laplanche =

French psychoanalyst, author & editor

- Born: 21 June 1924; Paris, France
- Died: 6 May 2012 (age 87); Beaune, France
- Education: École Normale Supérieure; University of Paris
- Known for: General theory of seduction Enigmatic signifiers
- Scientific career
- Fields: Psychoanalysis, viticulture
- Doctoral advisor: Jean Delay
- Other academic advisors: Ferdinand Alquié, Gaston Bachelard, Jean Hyppolite, Maurice Merleau-Ponty

Jean Laplanche (French: [laplɑ̃ʃ]; 21 June 1924 – 6 May 2012) was a French author, psychoanalyst and winemaker. Laplanche is best known for his work on psychosexual development and Sigmund Freud's seduction theory, and wrote more than a dozen books on psychoanalytic theory. The journal Radical Philosophy described him as "the most original and philosophically informed psychoanalytic theorist of his day."

From 1988 to his death, Laplanche was the scientific director of the German to French translation of Freud's complete works (Oeuvres Complètes de Freud / Psychanalyse – OCF.P) in the Presses Universitaires de France, in association with André Bourguignon, Pierre Cotet and François Robert.

== Life ==
=== Early ===
Laplanche grew up in the Côte d'Or region of France. In his adolescence he was active in Catholic Action, a left-wing social justice organization. Laplanche attended the École Normale Supérieure in the 1940s, studying philosophy. He was a student of Ferdinand Alquié, Gaston Bachelard, Jean Hyppolite and Maurice Merleau-Ponty. In 1943, during the Vichy regime, Laplanche joined the French Resistance, and was active in Paris and Bourgogne. In 1946–47, he visited Harvard University for a year. Instead of joining that university's philosophy department, he instead studied at the Department of Social Relations, and became interested in psychoanalytic theory. After returning to France, Laplanche began attending lectures and undergoing psychoanalytic treatment under Jacques Lacan. Laplanche, advised by Lacan, began studying medicine, and eventually earned his doctorate and became an analyst himself, joining the International Psychoanalytical Association, of which he remained a member until his death.

Laplanche continued his political activity. In 1948, Laplanche was one of the founding members of the organization Socialisme ou Barbarie (Socialism or Barbarism) after breaking with Trotskyism, but notes that the group's "atmosphere soon became impossible", due to the influence of Cornelius Castoriadis, who "exerted hegemony over the journal." Nevertheless, Laplanche remained "in favour of the thesis of Socialisme ou Barbarie" until 1968.

=== Later ===
==== Winemaking in Pommard ====
Laplanche for many years ran Chateau de Pommard, a French vineyard, together with his wife Nadine. Chateau de Pommard is a 50-acre (20 ha) winery in Burgundy, and has the longest continuous vineyard in the Côte-d'Or region. The Laplanches lived on the estate and made wine for a number of years. In 2003, the couple sold the estate to new owners. The deal included an agreement that the Laplanches would remain on the estate and continue for some time to participate in the winemaking process. Their wine has been advertised as "the only wine in the world grown and bottled by an old disciple of Lacan's."

Laplanche and his wife were interviewed, about both wine and psychoanalysis, in Agnès Varda's documentary The Gleaners and I.

Nadine Laplanche died in spring 2010. Jean Laplanche seemed to live exclusively in Pommard until his death two years later.

==== The psychoanalyst, the scholar and the academic ====
Jean Laplanche was one of the founders of the Association Psychanalytique de France (1964) and served also as its president in 1969–1971. He was later an honorary member of this Association with Jean-Bertrand Pontalis and Guy Rosolato.

Laplanche was granted honorary doctorates from the University of Lausanne (1986), the University of Buenos Aires, and the University of Athens. He was the winner of the Mary S. Sigourney Award (1995). Laplanche was also made a Knight of Arts and Letters in 1990.

Jean Laplanche was an Emeritus Professor at the University of Paris, where he taught from 1970 until 1993: he introduced the teaching of psychoanalysis in the "U.F.R. des Sciences Humaines Cliniques" in Paris VII and brought it to the level of research. He supervised theses of students, who are now teaching "psychoanalysis in the university" (title of the research-review founded by Jean Laplanche: 1975–1994) in France and elsewhere in the world (especially in Latin America).

== Work ==
Laplanche published his first book in 1961. It was the medical thesis "Hölderlin et la question du père". The following year, he was invited to a position at the Sorbonne by Daniel Lagache. Since then, Laplanche maintained a regular publication schedule. Together with colleague Jean-Bertrand Pontalis, Laplanche in 1967 published The Language of Psycho-Analysis, which has become a standard encyclopedic reference on psychoanalysis. It was translated into English in 1973, and its thirteenth French edition was published in 1997. Laplanche was president of the Association Psychoanalytique de France from 1969 to 1971, being succeeded by Pontalis. His seminars have been published in the seven volume Problématiques series while many of his most important essays are found in La révolution copernicienne inachevée (1992).

Laplanche's work can be described under three interconnected headings: 1- the critical reading of Freud; 2- the translational model of the mind linked to the actual practice of translating Freud's writings into French; 3- the development of the Generalized Theory of Seduction. The first aspect of his œuvre can be considered as the basis for the two other aspects. Laplanche adapted the psychoanalytic method invented by Freud to the reading of Freud's own writings thus opening new critical outlooks on psychoanalytic theory. Translation is a major aspect in that it is both a concept extracted from Freud's theory of repression - as expounded in the latter's letters to Wilhelm Fliess - but also a means of updating Freud's theory and actually translating Freud into another language than the German original - which also contributed a closer reading of the original. As for the Generalized Theory of Seduction, it can be seen as Laplanche's effort at giving new foundations to psychoanalysis through the implementation of the two other aspects.

=== Seduction theory ===
One of his major contributions to psychoanalysis consists of the théorie de la séduction généralisée (theory of the general seduction, 1987). Of his work on Freud's seduction theory, he said,

[M]y job has been to show why Freud missed some very important points in this theory. But before saying that we must revise the theory, we must know it. And I think that ignorance concerning the seduction theory causes people to go back to something pre-analytic. By discussing the seduction theory we are doing justice to Freud, perhaps doing Freud better justice than he did himself. He forgot the importance of his theory, and its very meaning, which was not just the importance of external events.

Laplanche proposed 'a reformulation of Freud's seduction theory as a truly general theory of the origins of the repressed unconscious, rather than a mere etiological hypothesis about neurotic symptoms'. The goal of the theory was to account 'for the "normal" development of the unconscious in human beings, while ... it carries in its wake a theory of transference and of the psychoanalytic process in general'.

Laplanche highlights '"enigmatic signifiers" ... transmitted via parental messages to the other' as a key element in the creation of the unconscious: in Laplanche's words, 'The enigma is in itself a seduction and its mechanisms are unconscious'. Thus 'Laplanche makes the link in Freud between the intrusive impact of the adult Other on the one hand, and the traumatic registration, representation or inscription of the Other's presence' on the other.

=== The Unfinished Copernican Revolution ===
Following the introduction of the theory of generalized seduction, Laplanche published a collection of essays under the title "The Unfinished Copernican Revolution" which referred specifically to the "object" of psychoanalysis, the unconscious — the generalised seduction theory emphasising that such a revolution is "incomplete."

Freud, who repeatedly compared the psychoanalytic discovery to a Copernican revolution, was for Laplanche both "his own Copernicus but also his own Ptolemy." On the Copernican side, there is the conjoint discovery of the unconscious and the seduction theory, which maintains the sense of "otherness"; on the Ptolemaic side, there is (to Laplanche) the misdirection of the Freudian "return to a theory of self-centering". Thus 'what Laplanche calls Freud's "going astray", a disastrous shift from a Copernican to a Ptolemaic conception of the psyche ... occurred when Freud replaced his early seduction theory ... of sexuality as an "alien-ness" decentring the psyche' with one centred upon the individual — 'the illusion of a universe that Laplanche would characterize as Ptolemaic, where the ego feels it occupies the central position'.

=== Gender ===
The category of gender, says Jean Laplanche, is often "absent or unnoticed" in Freud. It is the child in the presence of adults, which raises the question of this difference which exists in adults. Gender assignment "is a complex process of acts which extends into the language and behavior of the child's significant others, its entourage". The child is "bombarded" by "prescriptive" messages which it has to translate and make sense of — 'messages of gender assignment, all those provided by the adults close to the child: parents, grandparents, brothers and sisters. Their fantasies, their unconscious or preconscious expectations'. Thus for Jean Laplanche "Yes, gender precedes sex. But instead of organizing it, it is organized by the latter." It is primarily the "sexual" element in the parents which "creates a fuss in gender-assignation," because the infantile sexuality of the adults is reactivated in the presence of the child.

=== Drive or object? ===
One key distinction between Laplanche's approach to psychoanalysis and most of those in the English-speaking world —Object relations theory, Ego psychology and Kleinian thought—is Laplanche's insistence on a distinction between drive (Trieb) and instinct (Instinkt). In contrast to the English-speaking schools, Laplanche—in some ways following Lacan—removes a biologically reductive basis from human sexuality.

== Bibliography ==
The following lists Jean Laplanche's main works in French. For a complete overview, including English translations, see the separate entry on his bibliography.

- Hölderlin et la question du père (Hölderlin and the Question of the Father), Paris, PUF, 1961.
- Vocabulaire de la psychanalyse (The Language of Psycho-Analysis), with Jean-Bertrand Pontalis, Paris, PUF, 1967.
- Vie et mort en psychanalyse (Life and Death in Psychoanalysis), Paris, Flammarion, 1970.
- Problématiques I: L'angoisse, Paris, PUF, 1980.
- Problématiques II: Castration-Symbolisations, Paris, PUF, 1980.
- Problématiques III: La Sublimation, Paris, PUF, 1980.
- Problématiques IV: L'inconscient et le ça, Paris, PUF, 1981.
- Fantasme originaire. fantasmes des origines, origines du fantasme (Fantasy and the Origins of Sexuality), Paris, Hachette 1985.
- Problématiques V: Le baquet-transcendence du transfert, Paris, PUF, 1987.
- Nouveaux fondements pour la psychanalyse (New Foundations for Psychoanalysis), Paris, PUF, 1987.
- Traduire Freud, Paris, PUF, 1989.
- La révolution copernicienne inachevée (Travaux 1967–1992), Paris, Aubier 1992 ISBN 2-7007-2166-7.
- Le fourvoiement biologisant de la sexualité chez Freud, Paris, Les empêcheurs de penser en rond, 1993.
- Entre séduction et inspiration: l'homme, Paris, PUF, 1999.
- Problématiques VI: L'après-coup – La "Nachträglichkeit" dans l'après-coup (1990–1991), Paris, PUF, 2006.
- Problématiques VII: Le fourvoiement biologisant de la sexualité chez Freud suivi de Biologisme et biologie, Paris, PUF, 2006.
- Sexual. La sexualité élargie au sens freudien. 2000–2006, Paris, PUF, 2007.
- Se Faufiler entre les Astres. Entretiens 1980-1995, Paris, PUF, 2024.

== See also ==
- Afterwardsness
