= École Freudienne de Paris =

Former French psychoanalytic professional body (1964–1980)

The École freudienne de Paris (EFP; English: "Freudian School of Paris") was a French psychoanalytic professional body formed in 1964 by Jacques Lacan. It became "a vital—if conflict-ridden—institution until its dissolution in 1980".

== Early history ==
In 1953 conflict within the Paris Psychoanalytical Society had reached such a pitch that "a group of senior figures, including but not led by Lacan, broke away to form the Société Française de Psychanalyse (SFP)". The latter's long quest for recognition from the IPA finally stalled in 1963: "it emerged again and again that Lacan's 'variable sessions' were the contentious issue" and in the end "the price of recognition was the final and definitive exclusion of Lacan from the training programme". After the International Psychoanalytical Association (IPA) demanded removing Lacan from the list of training analysts with the organisation, Lacan left the SFP, and it was dissolved the following year: "Half its assets went to the EFP, and half to a new Association Psychoanalytique de France...[which] was recognised by the IPA".

== Lacan's "Founding Act" ==
In June 1964 Lacan published the "Founding Act" to establish his own school, which became known as the "École Freudienne de Paris" (EFP). Grandly proclaiming that "a labor is to be accomplished—a labor which, in the field opened up by Freud, restores the cutting edge of his discovery...[and] denounces the deviations and compromises that blunt its program", the Founding Act sought from the start to claim the moral high-ground in opposition to the IPA.

On the vexed question of training, the Act proclaimed that "a psychoanalyst is a trainer, for having conducted one or several analyses which proved to be of a didactic nature. Such empowerment is de facto".

== Disputes and the "Pass" ==
The conjoined issues of authority and of training analyses, which had led to the foundation of the EFP, plagued its history from the very start. In December, 1965, Francois Perrier resigned from the Board over the question of training, writing to Lacan that "What we expect of you is serene authority...not reckless skirmishes that might be the work of ex-guerrillas turned desperadoes...you always divide but never rule". In 1967, Lacan proposed the notion of "the Pass" in the hope of providing an answer to the question of accreditation; but the following year, in 1968, Perrier and two other former board members, with some twenty other members disputing as a group the EFP's accreditation process, broke away to form the Organisation psychanalytique de langue française, also known as the "Quatrième groupe".

"The issue of the pass continues to devastate the Lacanian community to this very day [2005]—more than two decades after Lacan dissolved his school". The pass was essentially a procedure whereby an analysand could give an account of his or her inward transformation before three "passeurs", who would then validate the transformation from analysand to analyst. Lacan was deeply committed to the "proposition that the analyst historizes only from himself: a patent fact. even if he is confirmed in doing so by a hierarchy". That was the basis for his moral authority with respect to the IPA; but "the form of charismatic authority which, in his personal and institutional presence, he so dramatically provoked" could scarcely be generalised to every member of the school without producing a Pirandello world of Right You Are! (if you think so).

Seen from outside, "Lacan's failed attempt to institutionalise awareness without institutionalising it, is fascinating", but fell down on the aporia that "the passe which changed the analyst was a passage from one inner state to another, while the passe which recognised the new status was a formalised external procedure". From the inside, "animosity and resentment...[&] suspicion of institutional foul play" were the Lacanian legacy of the pass.

== Dogmatism and dissolution ==
In the wake of the '68 split, "an increasingly rigid Lacanian orthodoxy" came to dominate the EFP: as a disillusioned former member remarked, "the custom of closing debates or silencing objections with a quotation from a Lacan who had become the object of a personality cult was scarcely conducive to open debate".

Perhaps as a result, in January 1980 Lacan announced the dissolution of the EFP. in order to forestall "the degradation of his ideas under the weight of his own institution...a challenge to authority yet at the same time authoritarian....Lacan was trapped in the circles of this paradox". He then founded another short-lived organisation, La cause freudienne; but "more than twenty associations emerged from the 1980 dissolution of the Ecole freudienne de Paris"—testimony perhaps to the way "the Lacanian movement was doomed to dissidence...the history of a perpetual acting-out, the momentary adventure, a kind of surrealist time". However La Cause freudienne kept alive the Lacanian legacy with its Lettre Mensuelle (edited by Jacques-Alain Miller and Gérard Pommier): at its masthead, a quote from Joyce's Finnegans Wake, "Here comes Everybody...seeker of the nest of evil in the bosom of a good word."
