= Doctor of Psychoanalysis =

The Doctor of Psychoanalysis (abbreviated Psya.D. or D.Psa.) degree is a professional doctorate in the field of psychoanalysis.

Traditionally, psychoanalytic training institutes have functioned as independent, non-degree-granting institutions, offering certificates in psychoanalysis and psychoanalytic psychotherapy. However, some graduate schools and psychoanalytic institutions have developed programs leading to doctoral degrees in psychoanalysis.

With rare exceptions, such as the Emory Psychoanalytic Institute, psychoanalytic institutes are located outside of the confines of traditional universities. Beginning in the 1970s, some psychoanalytic institutions began considering granting academic degrees to bridge this historical divide.

Doctoral degrees in psychoanalysis are generally pursued by licensed clinicians, including clinical social workers, counselors, and other mental health professionals, seeking advanced education and training in psychoanalytic theory and practice.

== History and institutions ==
In 1973, the Chicago Institute for Psychoanalysis floated the "Chicago Plan," proposing an independent doctoral-level credential in psychoanalysis. This push emerged in the context of growing efforts within American psychoanalytic education to secure academic and professional parity with psychology and psychiatry. The Chicago Institute was authorized to confer the degree of Doctor of Psychoanalysis by 1973, becoming the first institute to have this authorization.

The Center for Psychoanalytic Study in Chicago, Illinois, was approved by the Illinois Board of Higher Education to award the D.Psa. in 1985. The Boston Graduate School of Psychoanalysis in Brookline, Massachusetts, began offering a Master of Arts degree in psychoanalysis in 1994, a Doctor of Psychoanalysis in the Study of Violence in 2000, and the Doctor of Psychoanalysis (Psya.D.) in 2005.

In addition, a number of psychoanalytic training institutes in California have awarded doctoral degrees, including the Institute of Contemporary Psychoanalysis, the Los Angeles Psychoanalytic Society and Institute, the New Center for Psychoanalysis, the Newport Psychoanalytic Institute, the Psychoanalytic Center of California, the Psychoanalytic Institute of Northern California, and the Southern California Psychoanalytic Institute and Society.

Outside of the United States, a few European universities award doctoral degrees in psychoanalytic studies, including University College London, in collaboration with the Anna Freud Centre, and the University of Essex. The Parkmore Institute, founded by psychoanalyst Barnaby Barratt, also awards the D.Psa.

== Purpose and eligibility ==
Doctoral programs in psychoanalysis were developed in part to formally recognize advanced training and clinical experience in psychoanalysis and psychoanalytic psychotherapy. Some programs were designed specifically to provide clinical social workers with doctoral-level recognition, addressing historical disparities in their status within the psychoanalytic community.

These degrees are often awarded to individuals already licensed to practice psychotherapy at the master's level, who seek advanced clinical and theoretical education. In some cases, such as the Psya.D. program at the Boston Graduate School of Psychoanalysis, the degree may also lead to state licensure in certain jurisdictions.
