= Greater Kansas City and Topeka Psychoanalytic Center and Institute =

The Greater Kansas City and Topeka Psychoanalytic Center and Institute, also known as the Greater Kansas City Psychoanalytic Center and Institute (GKCPI), is a psychoanalytic center in Kansas City, Missouri, that comprises several interrelated organizations. Currently these are the Kansas City Psychoanalytic Foundation, the Greater Kansas City and Topeka Psychoanalytic Center (GKCTPC), and the Greater Kansas City Psychoanalytic Institute (GKCPI), also known as the Foundation, the center, and the institute. In the early 2000s, the Greater Kansas City Psychoanalytic Institute merged with the older Topeka Psychoanalytic Society.

The Psychoanalytic Study Group of Kansas City was incorporated in 1965. During the 1990s it changed its name to the Greater Kansas City Psychoanalytic Society. The Greater Kansas City Psychoanalytic Institute opened in 1996.

== Topeka Psychoanalytic Society ==
The Menninger Clinic was established by Charles Menninger and his sons Karl and Will Menninger as a mental health treatment center in Topeka, with an early focus on psychoanalytic treatments. By 1936, a Psychoanalytic Study Group of Topeka was established at the clinic, under the sponsorship of the Chicago Psychoanalytic Society, then the only midwestern organization recognized by the American Psychoanalytic Association (APsaA). Chicago had the second-oldest psychoanalytic institute in the United States and was the only midwestern organization recognized by the American Psychoanalytic Association at that time.

By the early 1940s, the Topeka Institute for Psychoanalysis was founded as part of the Menninger Clinic. During the same time period, the Topeka Psychoanalytic Society, closely associated with the clinic, was established. The Society was significant in the 1940s Topeka society as the oldest psychoanalytic society in the western United States after the Chicago Institute for Psychoanalysis. The Topeka Psychoanalytic Society consequently was given jurisdiction under the American Psychoanalytic Association over all psychoanalytic institutes in the United States west of Kansas; among others, the California Psychoanalytic Society and the psychoanalytic society of Oklahoma, later the Oklahoma Society for Psychoanalytic Studies were established under their sponsorship.

The Menninger Clinic relocated to Houston, Texas, between 2001 and 2003, and members of the Topeka Psychoanalytic Society who did not relocate with it, became affiliated with the psychoanalytic organizations in Kansas City, about 60 miles east of Topeka.

== Associated figures ==
Persons who have been associated with the Greater Kansas City and Topeka Psychoanalytic Center and Institute or its predecessor organizations include the following:

- Karl Menninger
- Will Menninger
- Gardner Murphy (8 July 1895 – 18 March 1979), American psychologist specialising in social and personality psychology and parapsychology.
- David Rapaport (30 September 1911, Budapest, Austria-Hungary – 14 December 1960, Stockbridge, Mass.), Hungarian-American psychologist and psychoanalyst, former research director at the Menninger Clinic and later staff at Austen Riggs in Massachusetts.
- Otto F. Kernberg, Austrian-American psychoanalyst and psychiatrist
- Ernst Simmel (4 April 1882, Breslau – 11 November 1947, Los Angeles), Germ (January 28, 1921 – December 21, 2014) an American neurologist and psychoanalyst.
- Ernst Ticho (1915 – 1996), Austrian-American psychoanalyst and psychiatrist.
- Gertrude Ticho (1920 – 2004), Austrian-American psychoanalyst and psychiatrist. From 1969 to 1974, she served as director of the Topeka Institute for Psychoanalysis.
- Robert S. Wallerstein, (28 January 1921 – 21 December 2014), German-American psychoanalyst, later president of the International Psychoanalytic Association

== See also ==
- American Psychoanalytic Association
- International Psychoanalytic Association
- Menninger Clinic
- List of schools of psychoanalysis
- Psychoanalytic institutes and societies in the United States
