= List of schools of psychoanalysis =

This is a list of schools of psychoanalysis.

== International schools and organizations ==
- International Federation of Psychoanalytic Societies (IFPS)
- École Européenne de Psychanalyse (EEP) (Europe)
- International Psychoanalytical Association (founded 1910)
- La Nueva Escuela Lacaniana (NEL) (Peru, Ecuador, Venezuela, Cuba, Colombia and Miami)
- World Association of Psychoanalysis (founded 1992)
- School of Psychoanalysis of the Forums of the Lacanian Field (IF-EPFCL)
- Federation of the European Schools of Psychoanalysis (FESP)
- International Association for Relational Psychoanalysis and Psychotherapy

== Argentina ==
- Fundación Descartes
- Escuela de la Orientación Lacaniana
- Asociación de Psicoanálisis de La Plata (La Plata)
- Foro Analítico del Río de la Plata (Buenos Aires)

== Belgium ==
- New Lacanian School (NLS) (Brussels)

== Brazil ==
- Escola Brasileira de Psicanalise (EBP)
- Escola de Psicanálise dos Fóruns do Campo Lacaniano (EPFCL)
- Sociedade Brasileira de Psicanálise Integrativa (SBPI)
- Associação Brasileira de Psicanálise Insight
- Sociedade Paulista de Psicanálise
- Instituto Paulista de Psicanálise
- Escola Letra Freudiana (ELF)
- Associação Brasileira de Filosofia e Psicanálise (ABRAFP)
- Escola Freudiana de Formação em Psicanalítica (EFFP)
- Escola Lacaniana de Formação Psicanalítica (ELFP)
- Sociedade Brasileira de Psicanálise Lacaniana (SBPL)

== Canada ==
- Institute for the Advancement of Self Psychology (IASP)
- Toronto Institute for Contemporary Psychoanalysis (TICP)
- Toronto Psychoanalytic Society and Institute (TPS)
- The Western Branch Canadian Psychoanalytic Society (WBCPS)

== Chile ==
- Sociedad Chilena de Psicoanálisis-ICHPA

== England ==
- The Institute of Psychoanalysis
- Tavistock Society of Psychotherapists

== France ==
- Association Psychanalytique de France
- École Freudienne de Paris (1964–1980)
- École de la Cause Freudienne (ECF) (Paris)
- École Lacanienne de Psychanalyse
- Société psychanalytique de Paris
- Société psychanalytique de recherche et de formation (SPRF)

== Iran ==
- Hamava Institute (Tehran)

== Italy ==
- Scuola Lacaniana di Psicoanalisi del Campo Freudiano (Rome)
- Scuola di psicoanalisi dei Forums del Campo lacaniano

== Lebanon ==
- Lebanese Association for the Development of Psychoanalysis (ALDeP)

== Mexico ==
- École Lacanienne de Psychanalyse

== Norway ==
- Institutt for Psykoterapi
- Norsk Psykoanalytisk Institutt

== Peru ==
- Nueva Escuela Lacaniana del Campo Freudiano (NEL) (Lima)

== Portugal ==
- Portuguese Psychoanalytical Society

== Spain ==
- Escuela Lacaniana de Psicoanálisis del Campo Freudiano (Barcelona)
- Escuela de Psicoanálisis de los Foros del Campo lacaniano

== Sweden ==
- Svenska psykoanalytiska institutet (Stockholm)

== Switzerland ==
- Institut International de Psychanalyse et de Psychothérapie Charles Baudouin (Geneva)

== United States ==
- Academy of Clinical and Applied Psychoanalysis
- American Institute for Psychoanalysis
- Boston Graduate School of Psychoanalysis (founded 1973)
- Boston Psychoanalytic Society and Institute (founded 1931)
- California Graduate Institute (founded 1968)
- Center for Psychotherapy and Psychoanalysis of New Jersey https://cppnj.org
- Center for Modern Psychoanalytic Studies
- Chicago Institute for Psychoanalysis (founded 1932)
- Columbia University Center for Psychoanalytic Training and Research
- Chicago Center for Psychoanalysis (founded 1984) https://www.ccpsa.org/
- Denver Institute for Psychoanalysis (founded 1969)
- Emory University Emory University Psychoanalytic Institute
- International Psychotherapy Institute
- Institute for Contemporary Psychotherapy, New York, NY (founded 1971)
- Institute for the Psychoanalytic Study of Subjectivity
- Institute of Contemporary Psychoanalysis, Los Angeles
- Institute of Contemporary Psychotherapy + Psychoanalysis, Washington, DC
- Massachusetts Institute for Psychoanalysis (founded 1987)
- Menninger Foundation (founded 1919)
- National Psychological Association for Psychoanalysis (founded 1948)
- New Center for Psychoanalysis in Los Angeles, founded 2005 from merger of the Los Angeles Psychoanalytic Society and Institute (LAPSI, founded 1946) and the Southern California Psychoanalytic Institute and Society (SCPIS, founded 1950)
- New York Psychoanalytic Society and Institute (founded 1911)
- New York University Postdoctoral Program in Psychotherapy and Psychoanalysis
- Newport Psychoanalytic Institute
- Psychoanalytic Center of Philadelphia (PCOP)
- Psychoanalytic Psychotherapy Study Center, New York, NY
- San Diego Psychoanalytic Center (SDPC), founded in 1973 as the San Diego Psychoanalytic Society and Institute
- San Francisco Psychoanalytic Society and Institute (founded 1942)
- St. Louis Psychoanalytic Institute
- Western New England Institute for Psychoanalysis (founded 1952)
- William Alanson White Institute (founded 1946)

== Turkey ==
- Institute of the Istanbul Psychoanalytical Association. IPA Component Society
- Institute of the PSIKE Istanbul Psychoanalytical Assoc.for Training R&D. IPA Component Society
- Forum du Champ lacanien de Turquie. EPFCL Member
