= Lay analysis =

Psychoanalysis by non-physicians

A lay analysis is a psychoanalysis performed by someone who is not a physician but has formally undergone a training analysis from a psychoanalytic institute; that person is designated a lay analyst.

Unlike France and other member-countries of the International Psychoanalytical Association, the American Psychoanalytic Association started to admit nonmedical analysts only from late 1988 after long legal battles.

In The Question of Lay Analysis (1927), Sigmund Freud defended the right of those trained in psychoanalysis to practice therapy irrespective of any medical degree. He would strive tirelessly to maintain the independence of the psychoanalytic movement from what he saw as a medical monopoly for the rest of his life.

== Freud and non-medical analysts ==
From the outset, Freud welcomed lay (non-medical) people as practitioners of psychoanalysis: Otto Rank and Theodor Reik (author of Third Ear concept in his famous book - Listening with the Third Ear (1948)) were two such notable analysts, as well as Freud's daughter Anna. In Freud's view, psychoanalysis was a full-fledged professional field and could have its own standards independent of medicine. Indeed, in 1913 he wrote "The practice of psychoanalysis has far less need for medical training than for educational preparation in psychology and free human insight. The majority of physicians are not equipped for the work of psychoanalysis".

Thus Freud saw psychoanalysis as "a profession of lay curers of souls who need not be doctors and should not be priests"; and this new usage of "lay" (to include non-physicians) is the origin of the term, "lay analysis." Such prominent psychoanalytic figures as Anna Freud, Erik H. Erikson, Ernst Kris, and Harry Guntrip were non-physicians.

When in the 1920s Reik became embroiled in legal challenges over his right to practice psychoanalysis, Freud rose ardently to his defence, writing Lay Analysis in support of his position; and adding privately that "the struggle for lay analysis must be fought through some time or another. Better now than later. As long as I live, I shall balk at having psychoanalysis swallowed by medicine".

== Opposition to Freud ==
However, embroiled in a struggle for psychoanalytic respectability, the plurality of Freud's followers were not at one with him on this issue, and opposition was especially contentious in the United States. The issue remained heated until World War II - a split with the American Association only being prevented in the 1920s when a compromise allowed lay analysts to work with children alone in New York.

In 1938, the American Psychoanalytic Association (APsA) formally began limiting membership of the association to physicians who had first trained as psychiatrists and subsequently undergone a training analysis at a (then European) psychoanalytic institute. The move has been described as initiating an official cleavage with the rest of the IPA which would not be settled until 1987.

During that period, many in the States believed, in Janet Malcolm's words, that "American psychoanalysis is a great cut above psychoanalysis elsewhere in the world...the laxness and sloppiness of English, European, and South American analysis. There are other people, naturally, who...[debate] whether too much wasn't lost by this strategy - whether too many good people who are unwilling to go through medical training aren't being lost to analysis". The policy was somewhat softened by the readiness of the APsA to grant waivers over the decades to a number of individuals: these included, for example, Erik Erikson and David Rapaport. There was also the National Psychological Association for Psychoanalysis which Theodor Reik founded in 1946 specifically to train non-physicians.

However, only when lawsuits were brought in the 1980s alleging "restraint of trade"' was the official American position finally altered, and the question of lay analysis resolved - as Freud himself always advocated.

== In popular culture ==
In the 1947 film Mine Own Executioner, actor Burgess Meredith portrays a lay practitioner who treats a traumatized veteran.

== List of lay analysts ==
- Frances Deri
- Juliette Favez-Boutonnier
- Jacques Schnier
- Margaret Clark-Williams

== Sources ==
- Gifford, Sanford (2008). "The psychoanalytic movement in the United States, 1906–1991". In Wallace, Edwin R. IV; Gach, John (eds.). History of psychiatry and medical psychology. New York: Springer. ISBN 978-0387347073.
- Rycroft, Charles (1995), A critical dictionary of psychoanalysis, 2nd edition, London: Penguin Books. Pp. xxx, 214, ISBN 0-14-051310-8
