= Hanna Fenichel =

Child Psychologist

Johanna Fenichel, née Heilborn (21 October 1897 – 12 October 1975), was a child psychologist.

Johanna Fenichel, also known as Hanna, born in Berlin, was the daughter of Ernst Heilborn, a director of the Allgemeine Elektricitäts-Gesellschaft (AEG), and Antonie Heilborn. She became a social worker in 1916 after attending a private school named Sprengelschen in Berlin. After years of practicing her profession, she became a part of the Technische Hochschule in Charlottenburg (now Technische Universität Berlin), where she received her doctorate in chemistry in 1932. A year later, she moved to Paris, where she continued her education. Another year later, she moved to Prague where she was a part of the Prague Psychoanalytical Association, and met her future husband, Otto Fenichel.

Still unmarried, in 1938 Heilborn emigrated to Los Angeles, where she became a member of the Los Angeles Psychoanalytic Study Group. She specialized in early childhood development and studies, as well as teaching analysis. She was a leading member of the Los Angeles Psychoanalytic Institute. She studied children from the ages of eighteen months to five years and how they acted or reacted, and their thoughts.

In 1940, she married Otto Fenichel. On 12 October 1975, she died of cancer in Brentwood, Los Angeles County.

After she died, the Hanna Fenichel Center was founded by San Diego Psychoanalytic Society and Institute. The program's overview is "to create a nurturing community that supports each child's growing sense of self and innate passion for learning...through social, educational, and artistic environments.

== Works ==
Fenichel conducted broad works throughout the years of 1940s and 1950s with the second generation of Freudian scholars and psychoanalysts. Hannah worked with Richard Loewenberg is a different subject and they have a separate collection of work.

- (ed. with David Rapaport) The collected papers of Otto Fenichel

In 1938 she presented her project on the problematic of Archaic Object Relations as part of the Viennese Psychoanalytical Association.
