= Margaret Clark-Williams =

Margaret Clark-Williams (1910-1975) was an American psychoanalyst, who worked as a lay analyst in both France and England.

== Career ==
Having first come to France in her early twenties, Clark-Williams was subsequently analysed in the States by Raymond de Saussure; before returning to Paris after the second world war, studying psychology with Daniel Lagache, and finding (voluntary) work as a child therapist.

A celebrated series of trial at the start of the fifties saw her right to practice therapeutically as a non-medic challenged in the French courts: after a first acquittal, she was on appeal fined a symbolic franc.

For Le Figaro, it is a “quite curious case and the judgment of which will set a precedent”. On March 20, a police commissioner conducted a search ordered by the investigating judge at the home of Margaret Clark-Williams. The police report states that she “uses childish means”: “she has a house or a tree drawn and if there is no line at the bottom, she says that the child lacks a foundation!. The question of the violation of professional secrecy during this search is raised, and through the recognition of professional acts, recognition that the investigating judge immediately denied by investigating the prosecution. The Paris Psychoanalytic Society supported Margaret Clark-Williams, invited her to give a lecture and accepted her as a member in June 1950.

Although the ruling only related in her private, unsupervised practice of child therapy, Clark-Williams thereafter left France for England, with its more receptive stance towards lay analysis.

== See also ==
- Juliette Favez-Boutonnier
- Maria Torok
- Paris Psychoanalytic Society
- Theodor Reik
