= August Hoch =

American physician

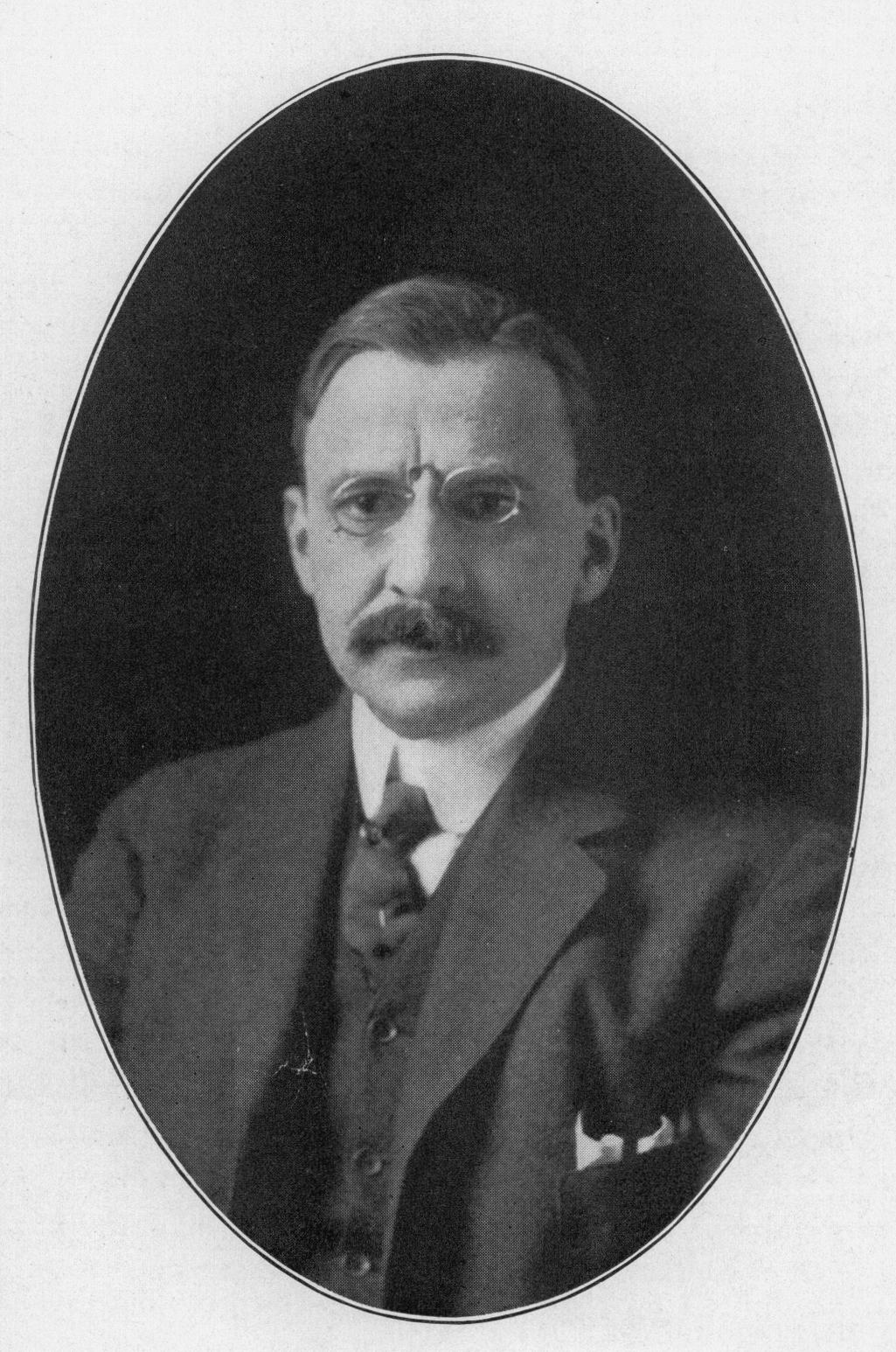
August Hoch

August Hoch (20 April 1868 – 23 September 1919) was a Swiss–American psychiatrist who was the third director of the New York State Psychiatric Institute in New York City from 1 February 1910 to 1 October 1917. As a neuropathologist and clinician, he exerted his influence on psychiatric developments during the early 20th century in the United States.

== Biography ==
He was born Charles August Hoch (and would sign legal documents with his full name) in Basel, Switzerland, the son of a minister, who was also director of the Basel University Hospital. Arriving in Baltimore on the passenger shoip "Rhein" on 3 August 1886 at the age of 19, he emigrated to the United States to pursue his medical education. He spent two years at the medical department of the University of Pennsylvania, where he was influenced by Dr. William Osler. When, in 1889, Osler moved to Johns Hopkins University Hospital in Baltimore, Maryland, Hoch followed to work at the Johns Hopkins outpatient neurological clinic and to pursue medical training at the University of Maryland. He received his M.D. degree from the University of Maryland in 1890. He remained an assistant to Osler in the clinic.

In October 1893, Hoch assumed a position at the McLean Asylum in Somerville, Massachusetts, near Boston, Massachusetts, to develop the pathological and psychological laboratories and the clinical psychiatric programs. Before assuming his position at McLean, McLean's director Edward Cowles sent him to Europe for most of 1893 and 1894 study in several European laboratories, including those of Friedrich von Recklinghausen, a pathologist at the University of Strasbourg; Wilhelm Wundt, a psychologist at the University of Leipzig; and Emil Kraepelin, a psychiatrist at the University of Heidelberg. He would return to European laboratories and Kraepelin's clinic in Heidelberg, Germany, in 1897.

In July 1894 he married Emmy Muench (22 January 1862 – 27 August 1941) of Basel, Switzerland, during his European trip. Hoch returned to America with his new bride on the "Veendam" passenger ship, arriving in New York City on 12 November 1894. In May 1895, while working at the newly named McLean Hospital, now on a new campus in Waverly (Belmont), Massachusetts, the Hoch's only child Susan (Susie) Hoch (21 May 1895 – 8 March 1980) was born. In Queens, New York City, on 3 July 1921 Susan married Lawrence S. Kubie (1896–1973), who would go on to become a noted psychiatrist and psychoanalyst. They produced two children and divorced in 1935. Susan would go on to study psychoanalysis in Europe, was a lifelong acquaintance of Anna Freud, and in 1943 helped found the William Hodson Community Center in the Bronx which was the first experimental psychiatric center for the elderly. She co-authored a book with Gertrude Landrau that would be influential in inspiring the creation of geriatric centers in the US.

Hoch formally left McLean Hospital on 23 June 1905. On 1 July 1905, Hoch began a new position at the Bloomingdale Hospital in White Plains, New York as its first assistant physician and special clinician. It was there that he became interested in psychoanalysis, which he believed would illuminate the field of human conduct. In 1908 he spent time in Zurich at the Burgholzli Mental Hospital with its director, Eugen Bleuler, and second-in-command Carl Gustav Jung where he deepened his knowledge of psychoanalysis, was trained in the use of the word association experiment, and became familiar with a new disease concept – schizophrenia – which Bleuler had first proposed in a publication that year. After four years at Bloomingdale, in July 1909 he was offered the directorship of the New York State Psychiatric Institute, following Dr. Adolf Meyer (psychiatrist) who was moving to the Johns Hopkins University. A major objective was to use the New York State Psychiatric Institute's services as an educational locus for physicians working in the state hospitals.

While at Bloomingdale, in 1909 Hoch put in his application to become a naturalized U.S. citizen, and it was granted in August 1911 when he resided in New York.

Hoch was actively involved in psychiatric organizations. He was president of the New York Psychiatric Society in 1908 and in 1909; president of the American Psychopathological Society in 1913; and president of the American Psychoanalytic Association in 1913 and in 1914. He was a member of the American Neurological Society, the American Medico-Psychological Society (now the American Psychiatric Association), and the New York Neurological Society. He was a leader in planning a scientific psychiatric journal by the Institute titled Psychiatric Bulletin.

== Legacy ==
On 6 March 1913, Hoch introduced Eugen Bleuler's disease concept of schizophrenia to elite American alienists and neurologists for the first time during a meeting of the New York Psychiatrical Society. According to him, "all of them made a lot of fun at the term, but it is remarkable what one can get used to."

Hoch wrote most of one book, Benign Stupors: A Study of a New Manic-Depressive Reaction Type, which was published posthumously after an ailing Hoch asked psychiatrist John T. MacCurdy to finish it for him after his death.

He retired from the New York State Psychiatric Institute on 1 October 1917 because of ill health and moved to California. He was the live-in psychiatrist for Stanley McCormick at his Riven Rock estate in Santa Barbara. He died on 23 September 1919 of nephritis at the University Hospital in San Francisco, California.
