= Louis Breger =

American psychologist, psychotherapist and academic (1935–2020)

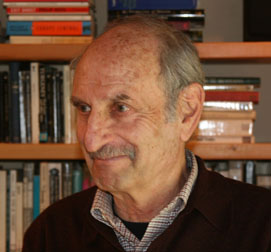

Louis Breger (November 20, 1935 – June 26, 2020) was an American psychologist, psychotherapist and scholar. He was Emeritus Professor of Psychoanalytic Studies at the California Institute of Technology

== Life ==
Breger was born and grew up in Los Angeles, California. He received his undergraduate education at Cornell University and U.C.L.A., following which he obtained his Ph.D. in Clinical Psychology at The Ohio State University in 1961. He then taught at the University of California, Berkeley, the University of California Medical School in San Francisco, and the University of Oregon.

In 1970 Breger became Visiting associate professor of Psychology then Professor of Psychoanalytic Studies in the Humanities and Social Sciences Division of the California Institute of Technology. He graduated from the Southern California Psychoanalytic Institute in 1979, where he became a Training and Supervising Analyst and was the recipient of the Franz Alexander Essay Award and the Distinguished Teaching Award. In 1990, he resigned from that institution and, with a group of colleagues, created the Institute of Contemporary Psychoanalysis (ICP) where he was the Founding President from 1990 to 1993. ICP reflected Breger's commitment to an open, democratic form of education: it is a non-hierarchical training institute, not affiliated with the American Psychoanalytic Association.

He was the father of three grown children and two stepsons, married to Barbara Gale Breger; together, they have 13 grandchildren. Breger died on June 26, 2020, at the age of 84.

== Research and scholarship ==
Breger has been both a practicing psychotherapist and a faculty member at several universities where he carried out research on dreams, reformulations of psychoanalytic theory, psychotherapy process and outcome, personality development, and the application of psychoanalysis to literature. He has also published two biographies of Sigmund Freud. He has always taken a critical stance towards psychoanalysis, as revealed in most of his publications. His work on dreaming – using the REM techniques of monitoring sleep through the night – showed that dreams are symbolic attempts to master emotional conflicts that have been aroused during the pre-sleep period, in contrast to Freud’s wish fulfillment theory (see Function of Dreams, 1967). His work on personality development – as found in his book From Instinct to Identity – is an integration of theory and research from child development, John Bowlby, Erik Erikson, Harry Stack Sullivan, Freud, Jean Piaget, primate studies, and research on hunter-gatherer societies. The study of Dostoevsky treats him as a fellow “psychoanalyst” who has much to teach us rather than a patient to be “analyzed.” The two biographical studies of Freud bring out the personal – often traumatic – roots of what is valuable and problematic in psychoanalytic theory and therapy.

== Works ==
=== Books ===
- Clinical Cognitive Psychology: Models and Integrations (ed.) (Prentice Hall, 1969)
- The Effect of Stress on Dreams (with I. Hunter and R. W. Lane) Psychological Issues, No. 27, (1971)
- From Instinct to Identity: The Development of Personality (Prentice Hall, 1974, reissued by Transaction Publishers, 2009)
- Freud’s Unfinished Journey: Conventional and Critical Perspectives in Psychoanalytic Theory (Routledge & Kegan Paul, 1981)
- Feodor Dostoevsky: The Author as Psychoanalyst (New York University Press, 1989, reissued by Transaction Publishers, 2009)
- Freud: Darkness in the Midst of Vision (John Wiley & Sons, 2000)
- A Dream of Undying Fame: How Freud Betrayed His Mentor and Invented Psychoanalysis (Basic Books, 2009)
- Psychotherapy: Lives Intersecting (Transaction Publishers, 2012)

=== Selected articles ===
- (with J. L. McGaugh) Critique and reformulation of ‘learning theory’ approaches to psychotherapy and neurosis. Psychological Bulletin 63, 338–358, (1965)
- Function of Dreams. Journal of Abnormal Psychology Monograph 72, 1-28, (1967)
- The manifest dream and its latent meaning. In J. Natterson (ed.) The Dream in Clinical Practice Aronson, 3-27, (1980)
- Some metaphorical types met with in psychoanalytic theory. Psychoanalysis and Contemporary Thought 4,107-140, (1981)
