= Frances Deri =

Frances Deri (née Franziska Hertz; 9 December 1880 – 25 May 1971) was an Austrian psychoanalyst, born in Vienna, who moved to the United States on the eve of World War II and practiced in Los Angeles, where she died in February 1971.

She married Max Deri.

== Training and contributions ==
After initially working in Germany as a midwife, Deri was analysed at the Berlin Psychoanalytic Institute, first by Karl Abraham, and then by Hanns Sachs becoming herself a lay analyst.

With the rise of the Nazis, she moved to Prague, where she became a member of the Prague Psychoanalytic Study Group alongside such figures as Otto Fenichel, Annie Reich, Theodor Dosuzkov, Steff Bornstein before emigrating to America in 1935. She was one of the first (and few) lay analysts to be accepted into the American psychoanalytic community, and practised in Los Angeles, where she could pursue her passion for the cinema. She was associated with the Los Angeles Psychoanalytic Institute.

She published articles on insomnia and sublimation, as well as contributing to the analysis of coprophilia, and to the fantasy of being part of the partner's body in sexual submission.

== Articles ==
- 'On Sublimation', Psychoanalytic Quarterly VIII (1939)
- 'On Neurotic Disturbances of Sleep', International Journal of Psychoanalysis XXIII, 1942

== See also ==
- Ernst Simmel
- Ralph Greenson
