= San Francisco Psychoanalytic Society and Institute =

San Francisco Center for Psychoanalysis
- Formation: 1941; 85 years ago
- Founded at: San Francisco, California, United States
- Headquarters: San Francisco, California, United States
- Members: ~ 500
- Co-Presidents: Michael Beckman & Paul Smith
- Formerly called: California Psychoanalytic Society, San Francisco Psychoanalytic Society and Institute, San Francisco Psychoanalytic Foundation

The San Francisco Center for Psychoanalysis, formerly the San Francisco Psychoanalytic Society and Institute is a facility for psychoanalytic research, training, and education located on 2420 Sutter St. in San Francisco, California.

The precursor of the SFCP was a society founded in 1941-1942 as the California Psychoanalytic Society (CPS) with branches in both San Francisco and Los Angeles. The CPS was under the sponsorship and supervision of the Topeka society, which at that time had jurisdiction over all psychoanalytic institutes in the United States west of Kansas. By 1946, the Los Angeles Psychoanalytic Society and Institute had become independent.

From the 1930s to the 1960s, the San Francisco Psychoanalytic Society had close connections with Mount Zion Hospital, which is now affiliated with UCSF but was then and independent hospital that eventually had a national reputation as a training site for psychoanalytically oriented psychiatrists. When the society was finally able to acquire an independent headquarters, it was across the street from Mount Zion.

In 2007, the San Francisco Psychoanalytic Institute & Society was combined with the San Francisco Foundation for Psychoanalysis, founded in 1991. The new entity was named the San Francisco Center for Psychoanalysis.

== Associated Figures ==
Persons who have been associated with the San Francisco Center for Psychoanalysis or its predecessor organizations include the following:

- Barbara Almond
- Eric Berne, Canadian-born psychiatrist and developer of Transactional analysis
- Nancy Chodorow American psychoanalyst, sociologist, and feminist theorist
- Kenneth Colby, psychiatrist and pioneer in artificial intelligence
- Erik Erikson, German-American lay psychoanalyst
- Otto Fenichel
- Ralph Greenson
- Alice Jones (poet)
- Thomas Ogden
- J. Robert Oppenheimer
- Robert S. Wallerstein

== See also ==
- American Psychoanalytic Association
- International Psychoanalytic Association
- New York Psychoanalytic Society and Institute
- List of schools of psychoanalysis
- Psychoanalytic institutes and societies in the United States
