= Trigant Burrow =

American psychoanalyst, psychiatrist and psychologist

Nicholas Trigant Burrow (September 7, 1875 – May 24, 1950) was an American psychoanalyst, psychiatrist, psychologist, and, alongside Joseph H. Pratt and Paul Schilder, founder of group analysis in the United States. He was the inventor of the concept of neurodynamics. He coined the term group therapy and was a president of the American Psychoanalytic Association.

== Life ==
Trigant Burrow was the youngest of four children in a well-off family of French origin. His father was an educated Protestant freethinker, his mother, however, was a practicing Catholic. He initially studied Literature at the Fordham University, Medicine at the University of Virginia, receiving his M.D. in 1900, and eventually Psychology at Johns Hopkins University (Ph.D., 1909). While working at the New York State Psychiatric Institute, he had the opportunity to attend a theater performance, during which he was introduced to two European doctors who were on a lecture tour in the United States: Sigmund Freud and Carl Jung. The same year Burrow traveled with his family to Zurich in order to undergo a year-long Freudian analysis by Jung., He would later help to popularise Freud and Jung's ideas on images in particular. Upon his return to the United States he practiced as a psychoanalyst in Baltimore until 1926. The American Psychoanalytic Association was founded in 1911, and he acted as the president in 1924 and 1925, though he was later expelled from it in 1932.

In 1926 Burrow founded the Lifwynn Foundation for Laboratory Research in Analytic and Social Psychiatry and published his first major work, The Social Basis of Consciousness. Until his death Burrow acted as the research director for the foundation and devoted particular attention to the physiological substructures of harmonious and rivaling participants within groups and societies, but also between states. His methods for measuring the electrical activity of the brain in connection with specific eye movements has led some to call him the father of trauma therapy [Eye Movement Desensitization and Reprocessing (EMDR)].

== Founder of group analysis ==
In 1921, Burrow was challenged by one of his analysands, Clarence Shields, with regard to the inherently authoritarian role of the psychoanalyst . The student criticized the perceivable difference in authority during the analysis and demanded his teacher be more forthright. It came as a shock to Burrow when he realized, "that, in individual application, analytical attitude and authoritarian attitude can not be separated." Experimenting with reversing the roles of analyzer and patient, as well as with mutual analysis, Burrow and Shield became convinced that both displayed blind spots, adherence to social conventions and considerable utilization of defense mechanisms. In Trigant Burrow's eyes acknowledging this distortion of the analytical endeavor is indispensable to restoring relationships to normality. To Burrow and Shields, clarifying and ultimately diminishing the neurotic dislocation of emotions and cognition seemed possible only in a group setting. Both invited previous patients, relatives, and colleagues, including the Swiss Psychiatrist, Hans Syz, to sit in on some group sessions. Trigant Burrow coined the term group therapy and wrote three fundamental texts which were released between 1924 and 1927.

While Burrow considered his work a legitimate extension of Freudian thinking, Freud himself did not accept it as such. Burrow's innovations led to a breach with orthodox psychoanalysis, Otto Fenichel for example criticising as repressive/inspirational “the work of Burrow who, by 'phyloanalysis,' tries to bring his patients to a reconsideration of their natural ways of functioning”. In retrospect however, he can be seen as pioneering investigations into such phenomena as countertransference, and intersubjective psychoanalysis.

== Psychoanalysis as a social science ==
Under the impression that psychoanalysis should be further developed with more emphasis on the group, Burrow devised the concept of psychoanalysis as a social science. His criticism of the modern cult of individuality, and of the civilised preference for social over biological needs, led him to stress the communal elements in man's thinking and consciousness. Dieter Sandner has demonstrated in several essays that “two classics of group analysis”, S. H. Foulkes and Alexander Wolf, adopted and implemented essential suggestions from Burrow.

== Important publications ==
- The Social Basis of Consciousness, London 1927
- The Structure of Insanity, London, 1932
- The Biology of Human Conflict, New York 1937
- The Neurosis of Man, London 1949
- Science and Man's Behavior, New York 1953
- Preconscious Foundations of Human Experiences, New York, London 1964
- Das Fundament der Gruppenanalyse oder die Analyse der Reaktionen von normalen und neurotischen Menschen, Lucifer-Amor: 21. 104–113
- Paolo Migone, Le origini della gruppoanalisi: una nota su Trigant Burrow. Rivista Sperimentale di Freniatria, 1995, CXIX, 3: 512-217

Edi Gatti Pertegato & Giorgio Orghe Pertegato (editors), From Psychoanalysis to Group Analysis. The Pioneering Work of Trigant Burrow. Forewords by Malcolm Pines, Alfreda Sill Galt and Lloyd Gilden. London: Karnac, 2013 (expanded edition from the Italian book: Dalla psicoanalisi alla fondazione della gruppoanalisi. Patologia della normalità, conflitto individuale e sociale. Vimodrone [Milan]: IPOC, 2010, Second edition [First edition: 2009])

== See also ==
- D. H. Lawrence
- Jacob Moreno
- Lewis Mumford
- Psychodrama
- Phylogenetics
- S. H. Foulkes
