= DPSA =

DPSA or DPsa may refer to:

- Defence Production Sharing Agreement - a trade agreement between the US and Canada
- Department of Public Service and Administration — a department of the government of South Africa
- Dikwankwetla Party of South Africa
- Doctor of Psychoanalysis — a professional doctorate in the field of psychoanalysis
