= Ticho =

Ticho may refer to:

- Ticho, Anna (1894–1980), a Jewish artist who became famous for her drawings of the Jerusalem hills
- Ticho, Ernst (1915–1996), Austrian-American psychoanalyst
- Ticho, Gertrude (1920–2004), Austrian-American psychoanalyst
- Ticho, Gobesa in Ethiopia
- Ticho House (Hebrew: בית טיכו, Beit Tikho) is a historical home in Jerusalem, now functioning as a museum
- Ticho Parly (1928–1993) Danish Heldentenor who sang leading roles in most of the major opera houses
- Ticho (album), by Ewa Farna

== See also ==
- Ticho, ticho, ticho (1962) Lubomír Lipský
