= New Center for Psychoanalysis =

- Formation: 2005; 21 years ago; predecessor organizations: LAPSI founded 1946 and SCPIS founded 1950.
- Founded at: Los Angeles, California, United States
- Headquarters: Los Angeles, California, United States
- Members: ~ 280
- President: Luis Nagy, PhD
- Executive Director: Amber McClarin (2022-present)
- Website: www.n-c-p.org

The New Center for Psychoanalysis is a psychoanalytic research, training, and educational organization that is affiliated with the American Psychoanalytic Association and the International Psychoanalytic Association.

It was formed in 2005 from the merger of two older psychoanalytic organizations, the Los Angeles Psychoanalytic Society and Institute (LAPSI) and the Southern California Psychoanalytic Institute and Society (SCPIS), which had been founded as a single organization in the 1940s and then split around 1950.

== History of Psychoanalytic Institutes in Los Angeles ==
Psychoanalytic study groups are documented in the Los Angeles area from the late 1920s, with influence from the Chicago Institute for Psychoanalysis and the Topeka Psychoanalytic Institute The Los Angeles society was initially associated with the California Psychoanalytic Society in San Francisco, which later became the San Francisco Psychoanalytic Society and Institute after the Los Angeles group became independent. The first formal psychoanalytic institute in Southern California was founded in 1946 as the Los Angeles Psychoanalytic Institute, with key figures including Ernst Simmel, Otto Fenichel, May Romm (an analysand of Sandor Rado), Frances Deri, and Hanna Heilborn. Early members included psychoanalysts who had left Europe to escape Nazi persecution and the turmoil of the Second World War.

Like psychoanalytic institutes and societies in some other American cities, the Los Angeles Institute and its successor organizations split several times over the second half of the 20th century. One major source of schismogenesis was the conflict between the dominant ego psychology/neo-Freudian position and increasing interest in the ideas of Melanie Klein and Wilfred Bion, and later of Self Psychology and other developments. Another major factor was disagreement over the role of non-physician psychoanalysts.

In Europe, where psychoanalysis began, Freud himself was trained as a physician and his ideas were very influential among many psychiatrists and other physicians. However, some early figures in Freud's movement included non-physicians, such as his daughter Anna Freud, and he defended the notion of non-physician psychoanalysts in his essay on lay analysis. A number of later prominent European psychoanalytic thinkers such as Erik Eriksen and Harry Guntrip were also non-physicians. In the United States, the American Psychoanalytic Association was a nearly all-physician organization for many years, and opposed the expansion of psychoanalysis to non-physicians. This played out in a number of conflicts among American psychoanalytic institutes and societies, as psychologists and some other academics and clinicians also wanted psychoanalytic training and to practice psychoanalysis. (This ultimately resulted in a lawsuit in the 1980s, and American psychoanalytic institutes have all admitted non-physician candidates since at least 1992).

In 1950, the Los Angeles Institute split over the issue of non-physician analysts. The Institute for Psychoanalytic Medicine of Southern California broke away in that year, later changing its name to the Southern California Psychoanalytic Institute and Society (SCPIS, sometimes affectionately pronounced "skippy"). SCPIS focused on physician members, while the group that retained the name of Los Angeles Psychoanalytic Society and Institute (LAPSI) began to allow training of psychologists. It also pioneered research psychoanalysts, individuals with advanced degrees in social sciences, humanities, law, or some other fields who wished to complement their academic and professional work with psychoanalytic training. The SCIPIS group included May Romm, Martin Grotjean, Judd Marmor, among others.

During the 1970s through early 1990s, several other psychoanalytic institutes were founded in the greater Los Angeles in response to differences of opinion over the direction in which psychoanalysis should go. The Los Angeles Institute and Society for Psychoanalytic Studies (LAISPS), an organization of psychologists and educators, was founded in 1970. From the beginning, it offered training to a wider variety of health professionals than just physicians and PhD-level psychologists. Kleinian analysts had existed within both SCIPI and LAPSI but as minority viewpoints in both organizations. The Psychoanalytic Center of California (PCC) was established in the 1980s with a specific focus on the works of Melanie Klein and her associates; it joined the International Psychoanalytical Association in 1989.

Another source of controversy, similar in some ways to the earlier impact of Kleinian-Bionin theories, was the emergence of Self Psychology from the writings of Heinz Kohut and his interlocutors in the 1960s and 1970s. Analysts devoted to self psychology and intersubjective approaches formed the Institute of Contemporary Psychoanalysis in 1990. Robert Stolorow, one of its founders, was a major figure in intersubjective psychoanalysis on the West Coast.

In the early 2000s, leadership of both SCIPI and LAPSI began discussing a potential merger. Membership was declining across most psychoanalytic institutes in the United States (for a variety of reasons including changes in insurance coverage for long-term psychotherapy and changing institutional pressures, fewer psychiatrists and psychologists underwent full analytic training), and some of the earlier controversies such as admission of non-physician psychotherapists, had become irrelevant. SCPIS and LAPSI formally merged in 2005, with headquarters at the prior LAPSI building on Sawtelle Boulevard.

== Associated figures ==
Persons who have been associated with the New Center for Psychoanalysis or its predecessor organizations include the following:

- Franz Alexander (22 January 1891 – 8 March 1964), Hungarian-American psychoanalyst and physician who is considered one of the founders of psychosomatic medicine and psychoanalytic criminology.
- Hedda Bolgar, (1909-2013), Swiss-Hungarian-American psychoanalyst, former chief of psychology at Mt. Sinai Hospital (now Cedars-Sinai Medical Center), and founding member of the California School of Professional Psychology, the Los Angeles Institute and Society for Psychoanalytic Studies, and the Wright Institute Los Angeles.
- Daniel B. Borenstein, American psychiatrist, the 129th President of the American Psychiatric Association from 2000-2001.
- Louis Breger (1935-2020), psychoanalyst and formerly psychology faculty at California Institute of Technology.
- Frank Clayman-Cook (January 6, 1942 – July 9, 2021), psychoanalyst and formerly a rock and jazz drummer, best known as the drummer of Canned Heat.
- Robert Dallek, American historian specializing in the Presidents of the United States.
- Frances Deri née Franziska Herz, lay psychoanalyst
- Samuel Eisenstein, (died October 14, 1996), Romanian-American psychiatrist, first psychiatric resident at Cedars-Sinai and later clinical faculty member at University of Southern California School of Medicine, past president of SCPIS and a founding member of the San Diego Psychoanalytic Institute
- Paul Sophus Epstein physicist
- Hanna Fenichel, née Johanna Heilborn, (Berlin, Germany 21 October 1897 - Los Angeles, California 12 October 1975), child psychologist.
- Otto Fenichel (2 December 1897 in Vienna – 22 January 1946 in Los Angeles), Austrian-American psychoanalyst and prolific psychoanalytic writer.
- David James Fisher, historian and psychoanalyst, known for books on Bruno Bettelheim, Lacan, and historical topics in psychoanalysis.
- Louis A. Gottschalk (August 26, 1916 – November 27, 2008) was an American psychiatrist and neuroscientist, founding chair of the Department of Psychiatry and Human Behavior at University of California Irvine College of Medicine.
- Richard Green (sexologist), psychoanalyst, and attorney
- Ralph Greenson (born Romeo Samuel Greenschpoon, September 20, 1911 – November 24, 1979), American psychiatrist and psychoanalyst. Greenson is famous for being Marilyn Monroe's psychiatrist, and the basis for the protagonist in Leo Rosten's 1963 novel, Captain Newman, M.D., later adapted into a movie.
- Martin Grotjahn
- James Grotstein
- Susanna Isaacs Elmhirst (4 November 1921 - 16 February 2010), British Kleinian child psychiatrist and psychoanalyst, professor of clinical child psychiatry at the University of Southern California during the 1970s.
- Martha Kirkpatrick (December 1925 – August 2015), American psychiatrist and psychoanalyst, former vice president of the American Psychiatric Association, known for early work on lesbian mothers and as an advocate for LGBT psychoanalysts and psychiatrists.
- Joan Lachkar LMFT, (January 18, 1938 - October 31, 2022), German-American psychoanalyst and author of multiple books about narcissistic and borderline personality disorders and related topics.
- Peter Loewenberg, historian
- Judd Marmor (2 May 1910 – 16 December 2003), American psychoanalyst and former president of the American Psychiatric Association, known for his role in removing homosexuality from the American Psychiatric Association Diagnostic and Statistical Manual of Mental Disorders.
- Joseph Morton Natterson (November 24, 1923 - June 7, 2023), psychiatrist, psychoanalyst, and former faculty at USC and UCLA, author of multiple articles and books on psychoanalysis.
- Leo Rangell (October 1, 1913 – May 28, 2011), American psychoanalyst and clinical professor of psychiatry at the University of California.[1] He was also twice president of the International Psychoanalytical Association and the American Psychoanalytic Association.
- May Romm (October 14, 1892 – October 15, 1977), psychiatrist and psychoanalyst, former president of LAPSI and of SCPIS.
- Janice Rule actress and later psychoanalyst
- Elyn Saks, legal scholar at University of Southern California and recipient of a MacArthur Foundation Fellowship, known for work on involuntary treatment, mental health law generally, and psychosis.
- Ernst Simmel, psychoanalyst known for work on military trauma ("war neurosis", now known as PTSD) and alcoholism
- Robert Stoller, psychoanalyst and scholar of gender and sexuality
- Harvey D. Strassman psychiatrist and psychoanalyst known for early work on posttraumatic stress disorder
- Milton Wexler, celebrity psychoanalyst, Huntington's disease activist, and founder of the Hereditary Disease Foundation.
- William J. Winslade medical ethicist.
- Eugene Victor Wolfenstein (July 9, 1940 – December 15, 2010), American social theorist, psychoanalyst, and professor of political science at University of California, Los Angeles.

== See also ==
- American Psychoanalytic Association
- International Psychoanalytic Association
- Psychoanalytic institutes and societies in the United States
