= Jonathan Lear =

American philosopher and psychoanalyst (1948–2025)

- Born: October 9, 1948; New York City, U.S.
- Died: September 22, 2025 (aged 76); Chicago, Illinois, U.S.
- Spouses: Cynthia Farrar (divorced); Gabriel Richardson (m. 2003)
- Children: 2

Academic background
- Education: Yale University (BA); Cambridge University (BA); Rockefeller University (PhD)
- Thesis: Aristotle's Theory of Proof (1978)

Academic work
- Institutions: University of Chicago
- Main interests: Psychology; Psychoanalysis; Ethics; Ancient Greek philosophy

Jonathan David Lear (October 9, 1948 – September 22, 2025) was an American philosopher and psychoanalyst. He was the John U. Nef Distinguished Service Professor in the Committee on Social Thought at the University of Chicago and served as the Roman Family Director of the Neubauer Collegium for Culture and Society from 2014 to 2022.

== Background and career ==
Jonathan David Lear was born in New York City on October 9, 1948. His father and Norman Lear were first cousins. Lear was brought up in West Hartford, Connecticut.

Lear earned his B.A. (cum laude) in history at Yale in 1970 and his B.A. in philosophy at Cambridge in 1973. He then received his Ph.D. in philosophy at Rockefeller University with a dissertation on Aristotle's logic directed by Saul Kripke. He also trained at the Western New England Institute for Psychoanalysis in 1995. He subsequently won the Gradiva Award from the National Association for Psychoanalysis three times for work that advances psychoanalysis.

Before moving to Chicago permanently in 1996, Lear taught philosophy at Cambridge University (1979-1985), where he was a fellow and the director of studies in philosophy of Clare College. He also taught philosophy at Yale University and was chair of the department of philosophy (1978–79, 1985–1996). He is a member of the International Psychoanalytical Association. In 2009, he received the Mellon Distinguished Achievement Award in the Humanities.

During his time as the Roman Family Director of the Neubauer Collegium for Culture and Society was able to work with the Apsáalooke Nation and the Field Museum of Natural History to sponsor the exhibit Apsáalooke Women and Warriors.

In 2017, he was elected a fellow of the American Academy of Arts and Sciences. He was elected a member of the American Philosophical Society in 2019.

Lear was first married to Cynthia Farrar, with whom he had a daughter before divorcing. In 2003, he married fellow academic Gabriel Richardson, with whom he had a son. Jonathan Lear died from stomach cancer at his home in Chicago on September 22, 2025, at the age of 76.

== Philosophical work ==
Lear's early work focused on formal logic and ancient Greek philosophy. Much of his work involves the intersection of psychoanalysis and philosophy. In addition to work involving Sigmund Freud, he also wrote widely on Aristotle, Plato, Immanuel Kant, Søren Kierkegaard and Ludwig Wittgenstein, focusing on ideas of the human psyche. His most recent work explores the ethical task of managing to live with the fears and anxieties of world-catastrophe.

Lear argues that mourning is a central human practice through which we confront transience, reclaim meaning after loss, and shape how we live ethically in a finite world.

== Awards and honors ==
- American Philosophical Society, Member (2019)
- American Academy of Arts and Science, Fellow (2017)
- Andrew W. Mellon Foundation, Distinguished Achievement Award in the Humanities (2011–2014)
- Gradiva Award, National Association for Psychoanalysis
  - Best Article on the Subject of Psychoanalysis (1995), "The shrink is in", The New Republic
  - Best Psychoanalytic Book (1998), Open Minded: Working Out the Logic of the Soul
  - Best Psychoanalytic Book (2000), Happiness, Death and the Remainder of Life
- John Simon Guggenheim Memorial Fellowship (1987–88)
- National Endowment for the Humanities Fellowship for Independent Study and Research (1984–85)
- The Tanner Lectures on Human Values,
  - Harvard University (November, 2010)
  - Cambridge University (November, 1999)

== Works ==
- Aristotle and Logical Theory (1980)
- Aristotle: The Desire to Understand (1988)
- Love and Its Place in Nature (1990)
- Open Minded: Working Out the Logic of the Soul (1998)
- Happiness, Death, and the Remainder of Life (2000)
- Therapeutic Action: An Earnest Plea for Irony (2003)
- Freud (2005)
- Radical Hope: Ethics in the Face of Cultural Devastation (2006)
- A Case for Irony (2011)
- Wisdom Won From Illness: Essays in Philosophy and Psychoanalysis (2017)
- The Idea of a Philosophical Anthropology: The Spinoza Lectures (2017)
- Imagining the End: Mourning and Ethical Life (2022)

== See also ==
- American philosophy
- List of American philosophers
