= Beth Cujé =

Dr. Beth Cujé, LPC, LMFT (born 1936) is the award nominated and highly reviewed author of the book "Become the Person You Were Meant to Be - The Choice-Cube Method". She is the architect of the Choice-Cube Method, a self-help approach developed from her years of experience as a counselor/therapist. In addition to her practice, she also taught graduate courses in Counseling and Human Development for eleven years as an adjunct professor at The George Washington University. Her doctoral dissertation was entitled "An investigation of the effects of human potential seminars on the self-actualization of older adults."

The Choice-Cube Method is noted in the well-known textbook Selecting Effective Treatments: A Comprehensive, Systematic Guide to Treating Mental Disorders, and Cujé's blog is regularly referenced by self-improvement websites.

In October 2010, Cujé was interviewed about her method and its benefits on Lifetime's talk show "The Balancing Act".
