= John T. MacCurdy =

Canadian psychiatrist and co-founder of the American Psychoanalytic Association

John Thompson MacCurdy, or John Thomson MacCurdy (1886 – 1947), was a Canadian psychiatrist. He was the co-founder and first secretary of the American Psychoanalytic Association. He taught at Cornell University from 1913 to 1922. In 1923, he became a lecturer in psychopathology at Cambridge University.

== Works ==
- The psychology of war, 1917. With a preface by W. H. R. Rivers
- War neuroses, 1918
- (ed.) Benign stupors: a study of a new manic-depressive reaction type by August Hoch
- Problems in dynamic psychology: a critique of psychoanalysis and suggested formulations, 1922
- The structure of emotion, mobid and normal, 1925
- Common principles in psychology and physiology, 1928
- Mind and money: a psychologist looks at the crisis, 1932
- The structure of morale, 1943
- Germany, Russia and the future, 1944. Current Problems No. 23. Translated into French as L'Allemagne, la Russie le l'avenir: essai psycholoique, 1944
