= Gertrude Ticho =

Austrian-American psychoanalyst

- Born: Gertrude Ruth Höllwarth; October 19, 1920; Vienna, Austria
- Died: February 10, 2004 (aged 83); Chevy Chase, Maryland
- Burial place: Clarksburg, Maryland
- Education: University of Vienna
- Occupations: Psychoanalyst, professor
- Spouse: Ernst Ticho (1915-1997)

Gertrude Ticho (October 19, 1920, in Vienna – February 10, 2004, in Chevy Chase, Maryland) was an American psychoanalyst, born and trained in Austria. She was a clinical researcher and professor of psychiatry at George Washington University.

== Biography ==
Gertrude Ruth Höllwarth attended a secondary school in Vienna and studied medicine at the University of Vienna where she was awarded her doctorate in April 1944. Her dissertation was on Ranula under Emil Wessely. In 1946 she completed psychoanalytic training at the Austrian Institute for Psychological Research and Psychotherapy after the end of World War II. Her own training analysts were Otto Fleischmann and Alfred Winterstein. It was at the Vienna Psychoanalytic Association that she first met the lawyer and psychoanalyst Ernst Ticho; they would marry many years later.

In 1951 she emigrated to São Paulo, Brazil, where she started a private practice. Beginning in 1953, she was a training analyst at the Sociedade Brasileira de Psicanálise. She moved to the U.S. in the mid-1950s.

From 1955 on, she worked with Ernst Ticho (1915–1996). They married in 1956 and she changed her name to Gertrude Ticho. They both worked at the Menninger Clinic in Topeka, Kansas, and from 1969 to 1974, she served as director of the Topeka Institute for Psychoanalysis. In 1973, she moved with her husband to Washington, D.C., where she taught for 20 years as a clinical professor of psychiatry at George Washington University. During this time, she also trained other analysts at the Washington Psychoanalytic Institute.

According to the APA: "Her most important works include her publications on self-analysis as a goal of psychoanalytic treatment. [Gertrude] Ticho formulated the patient's ability to self-analyze as the goal of psychoanalytic treatment."

She retired in 2001 and died in Chevy Chase, Maryland of heart disease in 2004 at 83. She is buried with her husband in Garden of Remembrance Cemetery in Clarksburg, Maryland.

=== Memberships ===
Ticho was a member of the American Psychoanalytic Association as well as the Vienna Psychoanalytic Association.

=== Ticho Memorial Lecture prize ===
The annual Ernst and Gertrude Ticho Memorial Lecture prize was established in 2006. It is managed by the American Psychoanalytic Association and "is given by an early to mid-career analyst, 5 to 15 years post-graduation, who is likely to make significant contributions to psychoanalytic science, practice, and thought."

=== Foundation ===
Ernst & Gertrude Ticho Charitable Foundation is a private foundation founded in 2004 in Delray Beach, Florida.

== Selected works ==
- Luborsky, L., Fabian, M., Hall, B. H., Ticho, E., & Ticho, G. R. (1958). Treatment variables. Bulletin of the Menninger Clinic, 22(4), 126.
- Ticho, G. R. (1967). On self-analysis. International Journal of Psycho-Analysis, 48, 308–318.
- Ticho, G. R. (1971). Cultural aspects of transference and countertransference: Discussions by Charles Chediak, MD and Tetsuya Iwasaki, MD. Bulletin of the Menninger Clinic, 35(5), 313.
- Ticho, G. R. (1971). Selbstanalyse als Ziel der psychoanalytischen Behandlung. Psyche, 25(1), 31–43.
- Ticho, E. A., & Ticho, G. R. (1972). Freud and the Viennese. International Journal of Psycho-Analysis, 53, 301–306.
- Ticho, G. R. (1972). Childhood and Destiny. The Triadic Principle in Genetic Education: By Joachim Flescher, MD New York: International University. Psychoanalytic Quarterly, 41, 623–628.
- Ticho, G. R. (1974). Discussion of Ralph R. Greenson's" The Decline and Fall of the 50-Minute Hour. Journal of the American Psychoanalytic Association, 22, 792–794.
- Ticho, G. R. (1974). Freud: Living and Dying. Journal of the American Psychoanalytic Association, 22(1), 218–224.
- Ticho, G. R. (1976). Female autonomy and young adult women. Journal of the American Psychoanalytic Association, 24, 139–155.
