= List of credentials in psychology, counseling, and mental health =

This list is of professional and academic credentials in the field of psychology and allied fields in United States of America, including education, counseling, social work, and family therapy.

== Degrees ==
Although undergraduate (Bachelor's) degrees for psychology and counseling exist, in most jurisdictions the minimum requirement for professional licensure is a graduate degree (master's or doctorate).

Associate degrees

- Associate of Art (AA) or Associate of Science (AS): Associate degrees are usually two-year degrees and are often offered at community colleges. Many choose to start with associate degrees in counseling psychology, clinical psychology, or related fields, before starting work on degrees which require further education. An associate degree is usually not required in order to enroll in a bachelor's degree program. An associate degree does not meet the requirements for clinical practice or licensure.

Bachelor's degrees

- Bachelor of Arts (BA), Bachelor of Science (BS): Bachelor's degrees usually require four years of study and are required prior to entry into graduate programs where Master's or Doctoral degrees may be earned. Although a person may earn a bachelor's degree in counseling psychology, clinical psychology or related fields in mental health, a person may have had a major concentration in another field of study and still qualify for entry into a graduate school for study in the area of psychology. A bachelor's degree does not meet the requirements for clinical practice or licensure.

Master's degrees in psychology

- Master of Arts (MA) or Master of Science (MS) in behavior analysis, counseling psychology, clinical psychology.
- A Master of Arts (MA) in marriage and family therapy may be in psychology. A master's degree in the specified area may require completion of a master's thesis, dissertation and/or project.
- Master of Science in Counseling (MSC)

Master's degrees in related fields (See mental health professional)

- Master of Arts (MA) or Master of Science (MS) in education, family therapy, or a related field. A master's degree in the specified area may require completion of a master's thesis, dissertation and/or project.
- Master of Marriage and Family Therapy (MMFT) (may or may not be a psychology program)
- Master of Social Work (MSW)
- Master of Arts in Professional Counseling (MAPC)
- Masters of Science in Education (MSEd)

Doctoral degrees in psychology

- Doctor of Philosophy (PhD): A Doctor of Philosophy degree in psychology prepares the student to conduct independent research and to provide professional services (consultation, assessment, diagnosis, therapy). To use the title "psychologist," individuals must have graduated specifically from a psychology program and meet their state requirements and obtain a license to practice psychology.
- Doctor of Psychology (PsyD): Requires the student to create relevant and helpful research that contributes to the existing body of knowledge or scholarship in an area. At one time, the PsyD was assumed to not require significant research activities, focusing more on advanced clinical training. However, most academic institutions offering a PsyD today require the completion of a dissertation suitable for publishing. To use the title "psychologist," individuals must meet their state requirements and obtain a license to practice psychology.
- Licentiate in Psychology or Psychologist (LPsy) – professional title used in EU and Latin American countries and equivalent of PsyD in the United States

Doctoral degrees in related fields (See mental health professional).

- Doctor of Philosophy (PhD): A Doctor of Philosophy degree in a related field prepares the student to conduct independent research and to provide professional services (consultation, therapy). PhD degrees are awarded in social work, counselor education, and marriage and family therapy.
- Doctor of Education (EdD): Similar to PhD but granted by a college of education within a university. This degree is based on the scientist-practitioner model which prepares the holder for both types of work, i.e., clinical as well as research.
- Doctor of Marriage and Family Therapy (DMFT)
- Doctor of Social Work (DSW)
- Doctor of Psychoanalysis (Psya.D. or D.Psa.): historically awarded by some psychoanalytic institutions

== Professional licenses ==
Licensure as a "Psychologist." To use the title "psychologist," individuals must meet their state requirements and obtain a license to practice psychology.

- Licensed Psychologist – Doctorate in Psychology (except for West Virginia which requires a Master's in Psychology), supervised hours ranging from 1,500 to 6,000 (depending on the state), passing the Examination for Professional Practice in Psychology, passing additional state specific exams
- Licensed Master's Degreed Psychologists

- Licensed Psychological Associate – Master's in Psychology (Alaska, Kentucky, Maryland, North Carolina, & Texas)
- Licensed Psychologist Associate – Master's in Psychology (Colorado, New Mexico, & Oregon)
- Licensed Psychological Examiner – Master's in Psychology (Arkansas & Maine)
- Licensed Psychological Assistant – Master's in Psychology (Tennessee)
- Licensed Psychologist – Master's in Psychology (West Virginia)
- Limited License Psychology – Master's in Psychology (Michigan)

Other forms of licensure for mental health professionals. Professional licenses for mental health providers with a master's degree issued by US states to graduate degree holders which allow them to legally practice (additional requirements/training/hours, for Supervisors "-S")

- Licensed Clinical Professional Counselor (LPC or LCPC depending on the state) – Master's Degree in Clinical Psychology and/or Counseling, supervised experience, plus passing National Board Licensing and State Board Licensing Exams (double board certified)
- Licensed Clinical Social Worker (LCSW) – Master of Social Work required, plus supervised experience (2 to 3 years depending on the state), and continuing education
  - Licensed Independent Clinical Social Worker (LICSW) – Master of Social Work required, plus clinical training, 2 to 3 years training under an LICSW (depending on the state), and continuing education
- Licensed Creative Arts Therapist (LCAT) – Master's in Art Therapy, Music Therapy, Dance/Movement Therapy, or Drama Therapy, plus supervised experience
- Licensed Graduate Social Worker (LGSW) – Master of Social Work required, plus passing the licensing exam (Alabama, District of Columbia, Maryland, Minnesota, West Virginia)
- Licensed Marriage and Family Therapist (LMFT) – Master's in Marriage and Family Therapy and/or psychology required, plus 1,000+ (depending on state) hours of supervised experience, plus passing the licensing exam
- Licensed Master Social Worker (LMSW) – Master of Social Work required, plus passing the licensing exam (Arizona, Arkansas, Georgia, Idaho, Iowa, Kansas, Louisiana, Maine, Michigan, Mississippi, Missouri, New Mexico, New York, Oklahoma, Oregon, South Carolina, Tennessee, Texas)
- Licensed Mental Health Counselor (LMHC, LCMHC, or CMHC depending on the state) – Master's in Counseling and/or Psychology, plus 3 years supervised experience plus passing the licensing exam.
- Licensed Professional Clinical Counselor (LPCC or LPC depending on the state) – Master's in Counseling and/or Psychology, plus supervised experience
- Licensed Professional Counselor Supervisor (LPC-S) – Master's in Counseling, Family Therapy or Psychology, plus supervised experience

== Professional certifications and specializations ==
Certifications for licensed providers are offered by various non-profit and for-profit organizations such as the National Board for Certified Counselors and Affiliates. In most states, a license to practice is also required.

Psychotraumatology and Trauma Professionals

- PsyT – Psychotraumatology Specialist in Postraumatic Stress, Complex Trauma and Dissociation.
- CPT – Certified Trauma Professional is the standard for Trauma Studies.
