= Hedda Bolgar =

Psychoanalyst

- Born: August 19, 1909; Switzerland
- Died: May 13, 2013 (aged 103); Los Angeles, California, U.S.
- Education: University of Vienna (PhD, 1934); Chicago Psychoanalytic Institute
- Occupation: Psychoanalyst
- Employer(s): Mt. Sinai Hospital, Los Angeles Institute and Society for Psychoanalytic Studies, The Wright Institute of Los Angeles, (1970-), Hedda Bolgar Psychotherapy Clinic, (1974-)
- Spouse: Herbert Bekker
- Parent(s): Elek Bolgar, Elza Stern

Hedda Bolgar (August 19, 1909 – May 13, 2013) was a psychoanalyst in Los Angeles, California, who maintained an active practice when she was over 100 years old. At age 102, she still saw patients four days a week.

== Early life ==
Bolgar was born in Zurich, Switzerland, on August 19, 1909, the only child of Elek Bolgar, a Hungarian historian and diplomat, and Elza Stern, a reporter who was one of the few women to cover World War I.

When Bolgar was 9, her Marxist parents upset her by canceling her birthday party so they could take part in a civil uprising in Hungary. At age 14, Bolgar became a vegetarian.

== Career in Vienna ==
Bolgar studied at the University of Vienna. She studied under Charlotte Bühler and earned her doctorate in 1934. She knew Anna Freud and attended Sigmund Freud's lectures.

In the mid-1930s, Bolgar developed the "Little World Test" (also known as the "Bolgar—Fischer World Test") with her close friend Liselotte Fischer. It was a nonverbal, cross-cultural test similar to the Rorshach Ink Blot Test or the Thematic Apperception Test. When the Nazis annexed Austria in 1938, Bolgar fled Vienna.

== Career in the United States ==
After arriving in the US, Bolgar trained at the Chicago Psychoanalytic Institute and taught at the University of Chicago. While in the Midwest, Bolgar gave training on the "Little World Test." Bolgar was chief of psychology at Mt. Sinai Hospital (now Cedars-Sinai Medical Center). She helped found the California School of Professional Psychology, the Los Angeles Institute and Society for Psychoanalytic Studies and the Wright Institute Los Angeles, a postgraduate training center and clinic.

When Bolgar was 95, she helped organize a three-day conference called "The Uprooted Mind: Psychoanalytic Perspectives on Living in an Unsafe World." In 2012, at the age of 102, Bolgar was still seeing patients four days a week. At 102, she gave a lecture on "Dogma and Flexibility in Psychoanalytic Technique" before the New Center for Psychoanalysis, a Los Angeles group that offers advanced education to therapists.

== Personal life ==
Bolgar's husband, economist Herbert Bekker, joined her in the U.S. in 1940 and the two moved to Los Angeles in 1956. The couple had no children. Bekker died in 1973.

Bolgar died on May 13, 2013, at the age of 103. At the time of her death, she was likely the oldest active member of the American Psychological Association (APA) and probably the oldest practicing psychoanalyst in the United States.

== Quotes ==
- "I've lived through revolutions, famine, war. Things like that."
- "There was a war, and I had vanilla ice cream for lunch."
- "I started a lot of things at 65."
- "The day the Nazis came to Vienna, I left. I had been very active in anti-Nazi politics and it really wasn't safe for me to stay. They came in on a Sunday and I decided Sunday was a good time to leave because on Monday they'd start working. They'd probably find the person who wrote those terrible articles about them pretty quickly."
- "Women must be agents of their own lives. They must not be dependent on someone else to provide for them."

== See also ==
- List of people from Los Angeles
- Lists of centenarians
