= Martha Kirkpatrick =

Martha J Kirkpatrick (December 1925 – August 2015) was an American psychoanalyst and clinical professor of psychiatry at the University of California, Los Angeles. She was also vice president of the American Psychiatric Association. She was known for pioneering work on lesbian parents, providing evidence that their children were not psychologically harmed by growing up with same-sex parents. She also published extensively on the psychology of women in regard to relationships, divorce, and aging.

She was one of several humanistic psychiatrists interviewed for the documentary "Art of Storytelling: the human experience of being a psychiatrist" (2015) by Michelle Furuta. and was also interviewed for a profile in the Journal of Gay & Lesbian Psychotherapy.

== Biography ==
Martha was born in Oxnard, California to parents Richard Terkel and Marion Brewer who divorced when she was in infancy. Her mother moved with her to Battle Creek, Michigan, where she was adopted by her mother's new husband Leland Kirkpatrick. Martha earned her BA from the University of Michigan and applied to medical schools, matriculating at McGill University after experiencing delays in her application to be among the first women medical students admitted to Harvard. She received her MD in 1950 and moved to Los Angeles, completing residency in psychiatry at the Brentwood VA (now the Greater Los Angeles Veterans Administration Medical Center, in the Brentwood neighborhood of Los Angeles), where she was among the first graduates of the UCLA Department of Psychiatry.

Kirkpatrick was initially refused admission to a psychoanalytic training program, at least in part because of her history of lesbian relationships. In 1957, she married a psychoanalytically trained psychiatrist, Dr Seymour Pastron. They had two sons together and were divorced after twenty years of marriage. During that time, she underwent psychoanalytic training and became an analyst affiliated with the Los Angeles Psychoanalytic Institute. She was also affiliated with the Institute of Contemporary Psychoanalysis in Los Angeles.In the late 1970s, Kirkpatrick and some colleagues began pioneering work on the development and psychological adjustment of children raised by lesbian mothers, finding they fared no worse than children of heterosexual parents. She went on to publish extensively on topics of lesbian women, and women's experience of relationships, parenting, and aging.

== Notable publications ==
- Kirkpatrick, M. & Miller, D. (1985), "Private practice: Springboard or stumbling block for women leaders?" In: Women Physicians in Leadership Roles, eds. L. & C. Nadelson. Washington, DC: American Psychiatric Press, pp. 185–193.
- Kirkpatrick, M. (1987), "Clinical implications of lesbian mothers studies". J. Homosexuality, 14 (1-2): 201–211.
- Kirkpatrick, M. (1988), "Some clinical perceptions of middle aged divorcing women". In: Divorce as a Developmental Process, ed. J. H. Gold. Washington, DC: American Psychiatric Press, pp. 79–99.
- Kirkpatrick, M. (1989), "Middle age and the lesbian experience". In: The Middle Years: New Psychoanalytic Perspectives, eds. J. M. Oldham & R. S. Liebert. New Haven: Yale University Press, pp. 135–148.
- Kirkpatrick, M. (1989), "Society plays significant role in labeling of women as masochistic". The Psychiatric Times (May).
- Kirkpatrick, M. (1989), "Women in love in the 80’s". J. Amer. Acad. Psychoanal., 17: 535–542.
- Kirkpatrick, M. (1990), "Homosexuality and parenting". In: Women's Progress: Promises and Problems, eds. J. Spurlock & C. Rabinowitz. New York: Plenum.
- Kirkpatrick, M. (1990), "Tribute to Nancy C. A. Roeske". In: Educating Competent and Humane Physicians, eds. H. C. Hendrie & C. Lloyd. Bloomington: Indiana University Press, pp. x-xi.
- Kirkpatrick, M. (1990), "Thoughts about the origins of femininity". J. Amer. Acad. Psychoanal., 18: 554–565.
- Kirkpatrick, M. (1991), "Lesbian couples in therapy". Psychiat. Ann., 21: 491–496.
- Kirkpatrick, M. (1992), "Aging, like a woman". In: How Psychiatrists Look at Aging, ed. G. Pollock. Madison, CT: International Universities Press, pp. 141–147.
- Kirkpatrick, M. (1996), Lesbians as parents. In: Textbook of Homosexuality and Mental Health, ed. R. P. Cabaj & T. S. Stein. Washington, DC: American Psychiatric Press, pp. 353–370.
- Kirkpatrick, M. & Dickstein L. J. (2000), "Women psychiatrists in American post-war psychiatry". In: American Psychiatry After World War II–1944-1994, eds. R. W. Menninger & J. Nemiah. Washington, DC: American Psychiatric Press, pp. 569–593.
- Kirkpatrick, M. (2003) "The Nature and Nurture of Gender", Psychoanalytic Inquiry, 23:4, 558–571, DOI: 10.1080/07351692309349051
- Kirkpatrick, M. (2002) Clinical Notes on the Diversity in Lesbian Lives, Psychoanalytic Inquiry, 22:2, 196–208, DOI: 10.1080/07351692209348983
