= Barnaby B. Barratt =

British psychoanalyst

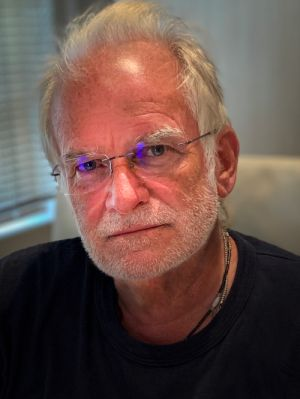
- Born: 17 April 1950 (age 76); Reading, Berkshire, England
- Education: Leighton Park School; University of Sussex; Harvard University; Michigan Psychoanalytic Institute
- Occupation: Psychoanalyst

Barnaby B. Barratt (born 17 April 1950) is a psychoanalyst, specialist in human sexuality, somatic psychologist, human rights activist, and practitioner of meditation in the Dharmic traditions of tantra. He has lived in England, India, the United States, and Thailand, and he currently lives and practices in Johannesburg, South Africa.

Formerly associated with the University of Michigan and the Wayne State University School of Medicine, he is currently Director of Studies at the Parkmore Institute.

== Education ==
Barratt was born in Reading, Berkshire. He was educated as a Quaker at Leighton Park School and graduated with first class honours in social psychology with a minor in Asian and African studies from the University of Sussex in 1973. He earned a master's degree in psychology and social relations and a PhD in personality and developmental psychology at Harvard University in 1976 with clinical training at Massachusetts General Hospital. He was a postdoctoral fellow at the University of Michigan's Neuroscientific Institute. He graduated from the Michigan Psychoanalytic Institute in 1989 and earned a second PhD in human sexuality in 1995 from the Institute for Advanced Study of Human Sexuality.

== Career ==
Early in his career, Barratt was elected a postdoctoral fellow with the University of Michigan Society of Fellows and served on the University's faculty in the Department of Psychology. For a major portion of his mid-career, he was professor of family medicine, psychiatry, and behavioural sciences at Wayne State University School of Medicine.

He was appointed and served on the faculty of the Michigan Psychoanalytic Institute for fifteen years, including almost a decade as a training and supervising psychoanalyst. He is currently a training analyst with the South African Psychoanalytic Association as well as a supervising analyst with the Indian Psychoanalytic Society. He is a full clinical member of both the International Psychoanalytical Association and the European Association for Body Psychotherapy as well as being elected as a Fellow of the American Psychological Association. He is a Diplomate of the American Board of Professional Psychology.

As the Founder and former Director of the Midwest Institute of Sexology, which provided educational services in sexual health for a period of seven years, Barratt offered expert testimony in 2005 to the Michigan House of Representatives’ Committee on Constitutional Law and Ethics.

He has addressed national and international conferences for many years. For example, in 2009 he presented in Göteborg, Sweden at the 19th WAS World Congress for Sexual Health, speaking on "Sexual Health and Rights: A Global Challenge." He was a keynote speaker at the 2015 Annual Conference of the United States Association for Body Psychotherapy, presented at the 2015 Congress of the International Psychoanalytic Association, and he lectured on psychoanalysis in Tehran in 2016. Barratt was an invited speaker at the IPA‑Asia Taiwan Conference in 2017, presenting on the “Asian Oedipus," and in 2018 he gave a paper, "Beyond the Complicity of Expression and Interpretation: Lived-Experience and the Critique of Consilience" at the 16th European Congress for Body Psychotherapy, in Berlin. He was a keynote speaker at the 2018 India‑Australia‑Israel Psychoanalytic Conference in Mumbai, India, and spoke on "The Problematics of Identity: Psychoanalytic and Hegelian Contributions to the Critique of Domination and the Rise of Fascism" at the 2019 Annual Conference of the South African Society for Critical Theory. Most recently, Barratt addressed the 2020 Annual Conference of the American Psychoanalytic Association on the question "What is the Role of Free-Association in Contemporary Psychoanalysis?"

Barratt is past president of the American Association of Sexuality Educators, Counselors and Therapists and former Chair of the Board of Directors of the Woodhull Freedom Foundation and Federation now known as the Woodhull Sexual Freedom Alliance, which advocates for sexual freedom as a fundamental human right. He has served on the Board of Trustees of Positive Vibes an organization that operates throughout southern Africa, supporting HIV+ community groups and advocating for the human rights and civil liberties of GLBTQI communities.

Barratt has served on the editorial boards of a number of national and international, scientific and professional journals, currently including Psychoanalysis, Culture and Society and Psychoanalytic Psychology. In addition to his books, he has published over a hundred articles and reviews in scientific and professional journals.

Currently, in addition to his psychoanalytic practice, Barratt is Senior Researcher at the Wits Institute for Social and Economic Research, University of Witwatersrand. In 2018, he was appointed to the College of the International Journal of Psychoanalysis.

Barratt considers himself a "radical psychoanalyst." The journal The Psychoanalytic Review describes him as a "notable authority" on psychoanalysis.

== Contributions to the Praxis of Psychoanalysis ==
Barratt has published extensively in the following fields:

Sexuality and human rights-

- Why Sexual Freedom is Fundamental: An Introduction to the Woodhull Freedom Foundation's “State of Sexual Freedom Report.” State of Sexual Freedom in the United States, 2010 Report. Washington, DC: Woodhull Freedom Foundation, ix-xvii, 2010.
- Sensuality, Sexuality, and the Eroticism of Slowness. In: N. Osbaldiston (ed.), The Culture of the Slow: Social Deceleration in an Accelerated World. Basingstoke, UK: Palgrave Macmillan (2013), pp. 136‑153. ISBN 978-1-403-99983-2 (hardcover); ISBN 978-1-403-99984-9 (softcover). Available online at:
- Sexual Health and Erotic Freedom. Philadelphia, PA: Xlibris, 2005. ISBN 1-4134-8784-X

Somatic psychology-

- The Emergence of Somatic Psychology and Bodymind Therapy. Basingstoke, UK: Palgrave Macmillan, 2010, ISBN 978-0-230-22216-8

Meditational practices-

- What is Tantric Practice? Philadelphia, PA: Xlibris, 2006, ISBN 1-4257-1150-2
- Liberating Eros, Philadelphia, PA: Xlibris, 2009, ISBN 978-1-4415-8675-9

However, Barratt is preeminently considered a radical voice in the contemporary rethinking of the theory, praxis and philosophy of psychoanalysis, in terms of post‑identitarian politics and liberatory treatment. These are his two early books on this topic:

- Psychic Reality and Psychoanalytic Knowing. Hillsdale, NJ: The Analytic Press, 1984. ISBN 0-88163-013-6 Republished in 2016 by Routledge (Hove, UK).
- Psychoanalysis and the Postmodern Impulse: Knowing and Being since Freud's Psychology. Baltimore, MD: The Johns Hopkins University Press, 1993. ISBN 0-8018-4547-5 Republished in 2016 by Routledge (Hove, UK).

He then began in 2012 and 2013 to publish his "Rediscovering Psychoanalysis" trilogy. This included a critique of the ways in which contemporary psychoanalysis has obfuscated some of Freud's essential findings, through the discovery of his free-associative method, about the human condition:

- What is Psychoanalysis? 100 Years after the ‘Secret Committee. Hove, UK: Routledge, 2012/2013. ISBN 978-0-415-69273-1
- Radical Psychoanalysis: An Essay on Free-associative Praxis. Hove, UK: Routledge, 2016. ISBN 978-1-138-95484-7

About these two books, the reviewer in Psychoanalytic Quarterly wrote:

"Barratt is at his best with essential criticisms of Harry Stack Sullivan, Erich Fromm, and Karen Horney of the culturalist and self-psychology, interpersonal psychology, and the relational group as well. Without a concept of psychic energy and the lack of the use of free association, they all avoid in one way or another the full meaning of the repressed unconscious. He does not stop there, as he is critical of the structural theorists or ego psychologists such as Anna Freud, Heinz Hartman, and their students such as Arlow and Brenner..."

A reviewer in the British Journal of Psychotherapy wrote:

"At a time when psychoanalysis is in the descendent and psychoanalytic publishing reducing its activities, Radical Psychoanalysis promises to be an important and valuable book in which Barratt argues passionately for a return to the discipline's roots ... in the free associative praxis; it is in the author's own words a plea 'for a return to Freud's originality, in the interests of a wisdom that has been, over the course of the last century, obfuscated and all but lost.' The purpose of the book is to investigate the method of free association as the cornerstone of psychoanalysis."

The final volume of the trilogy is:

- Beyond Psychotherapy: On Becoming a (Radical) Psychoanalyst. Hove, UK: Routledge, 2019. ISBN 978-1-138-36221-5

Reviewing the entire trilogy in the Psychoanalytic Review, it was discussed how Barratt argues for the necessity of:

"...a collective realization that surviving and living together will require shared awareness of the unreliability of all our representations ‑ the ultimate falseness of all our stories about our forefathers, our teams, our skins, our flags, our enemies, our psychoanalytic theories, and all the rest. I think Barratt is onto something..." and this reviewer concludes: "Recovering Freud's original radicality may save psychoanalysis‑ and civilization itself."

== Parkmore Institute ==
In 2017, Barratt founded the Parkmore Institute in Johannesburg, South Africa. The institute focuses on psychoanalytic, psychodynamic, and psychosocial studies, and it offers doctoral degrees in psychoanalysis, psychosocial studies, human sexuality, and bodymind healing. Candidates for the doctoral degree in psychoanalysis are generally required to have completed full psychoanalytic training at a recognized psychoanalytic institute, and the degree requires completion of a doctoral project published as a singly-authored paper in a journal recognized by Psychoanalytic Electronic Publishing.

Notable faculty members include Barratt, Loray Daws (a senior fellow at the Masterson Institute in New York City), Gerald J. Gargiulo (former president of the NPAP Training Institute and the International Forum for Psychoanalytic Education), and Beth L. Haessig (former president of the United States Association of Body Psychotherapy).

The Parkmore Institute is affiliated with the Institute for Expressive Analysis, a psychoanalytic training institute in New York City.

== Bibliography ==
In addition to his main books, Barratt has published dozens of original scientific and professional articles and reviews.

A bibliography of his psychoanalytic writings from 1975 to 2010 is available here –

These psychoanalytic writings of his from 2010 to 2020 are available here-

The ongoing "Rediscovering Psychoanalysis" project is available here -
