= Juliette Favez-Boutonnier =

French university professor, psychologist & psychoanalyst

Juliet Favez-Boutonnier (24 January 1903, Roquefort-les-Pins – 13 April 1994, Paris) was a French academic, psychologist and psychoanalyst.

== Career ==
After writing successive theses on ambivalence and angst, Favez-Boutonnier became a member of the SFP in the tradition of Pierre Janet, working to have psychoanalysis accepted in academia as a form of psychology.

Having backed Margaret Clark-Williams in her dispute with the medical profession over lay analysis, in 1953 she joined Daniel Lagache in splitting from the SFP in protest over what they saw as over-medicalised training procedures. In 1964 she would return with him to the shelter of the IPA in the newly formed Association psychoanalytique de France.

In the wake of the May 1968 events in France, her efforts to establish a clinical social sciences section within academia were finally crowned with success.

== See also ==
- Francoise Dolto
- Jean Laplanche
