= Psychoanalytic institutes and societies in the United States =

Psychoanalytic institutes and societies in the United States are often linked together, though a distinction may be made between the functions of the institutes (mainly training, education, and research) and the societies (other professional activities including advocacy and networking). Some local psychoanalytic organizations have both words in their title while others have only one or the other.

Psychoanalytic institutes are organizations that train psychoanalysts and psychoanalytically oriented psychotherapists, provide continuing education for psychoanalytically oriented mental health professionals, and/or carry out psychoanalytically informed research in mental health or social sciences and humanities. Psychoanalytic societies are local or regional professional associations of psychoanalysts and sometimes other psychoanalytically oriented professionals.

Psychoanalytic institutes in the United States may be affiliated with the American Psychoanalytic Association (APsaA), the International Psychoanalytic Association (IPA), or The National Association for the Advancement of Psychoanalysis (NAAP). The associations differ slightly in their training guidelines over such things as length and frequency of so-called "control cases" (patients seen for psychoanalysis as part of the training of candidate) or of the candidates themselves. The organizations also historically differed in their rules for allowing different types of professionals to undergo psychoanalytic training (e.g., for many years APsaA only allowed physicians to undergo psychoanalytic training, while IPA allowed psychologists and others to become psychoanalysts). (Note: Wallerstein, Robert S. (2022-04-25). "International Psychoanalytical Association". International Dictionary of Psychoanalysis – via Encyclopedia.com.) The associations historically also had different attitudes towards theoretical schools within psychoanalysis such as Kleinian or Lacanian approaches. S

Some psychoanalytic institutes have been accredited by The American Board for Accreditation in Psychoanalysis (ABAP), the only active accreditor of psychoanalytic institutes in the United States.

== Overview ==
There are several philosophical and psychotherapeutic traditions related to Freudian psychoanalysis. Among the largest are the schools of Jungian psychoanalysis or analytic psychology, based on the works of Freud's early colleague and one-time protege Carl Gustav Jung. The International Association for Analytical Psychology (IAAP) is the international accrediting and regulatory body for all Jungian societies and groups of analytical psychology practitioners, trainees and affiliates. Another, particularly prominent in Europe and Latin America, is Lacanian psychoanalysis, based on the work of the French psychoanalyst Jacques Lacan. The World Association of Psychoanalysis (WAP) was founded in 1992 and groups together a number of regional Lacanian associations. While some psychoanalysts and psychoanalytic institutes associated with APsaA or IPA may use or teach some Jungian or Lacanian concepts and techniques, in practice these have become somewhat separate traditions, with separate journals, professional societies, accreditation, and so on. Consequently, Jungian and Lacanian societies and institutes are not listed here unless they are also associated with either APsaA or IPA.

Many American psychoanalytic institutes are stand-alone, nonprofit, educational institutions of relatively small size, such as The Institute for Modern Psychoanalysis of Philadelphia (IMPP), (formerly the Philadelphia School of Psychoanalysis), and The Academy of Clinical and Applied Psychoanalysis (ACAP). A handful are affiliated with major universities: Columbia University Center for Psychoanalytic Training and Research; New York University's Postdoctoral Program in Psychotherapy and Psychoanalysis; Emory University Psychoanalytic Institute (EUPI). A small number are independently accredited graduate schools: Boston Graduate School of Psychoanalysis.

It is difficult to give a single "foundation date" for many of the institutes and societies. Some began as independent study groups or as sponsored affiliates of more established psychoanalytic institutes or societies in other cities. Most went through a process of accreditation by APsaA and/or IPA, which can take years to complete and which has several stages from recognized study group through provisional institute to independent institute or training institute status. Most were chartered as nonprofit organizations or accredited at the state level as educational organizations separately from their IPA/APsaA accreditation. Consequently, some foundation dates are approximate and some organizations have multiple significant dates listed.

There are also several institutions that are hard to categorize and have therefore been omitted, such as the Menninger Clinic in Houston, a prominent training program in psychiatry and clinical psychology with strong tradition of training in psychoanalytic approaches. The Menninger Clinic was previously closely connected with the Topeka Psychoanalytic Society; however, Menninger itself does not appear to be independently recognized by APsaA or IPA as a psychoanalytic institute, or to have an explicitly affiliated psychoanalytic society at present. The Wright Institute in Berkeley, California and the formerly affiliated but now independent Wright Institute Los Angeles, and the Austen Riggs Center in Massachusetts, similarly have long traditions of training psychoanalytically informed clinicians, but are not chartered as psychoanalytic institutes.

Some of the psychoanalytic institutes offer psychoanalytic licensure tracks of study, but not all.

== List ==
- American Institute for Psychoanalysis (AIP) - the second oldest continuously functioning institute in New York City, and third oldest institute in the United States, based on the growth-oriented philosophy Karen Horney pioneered in psychoanalysis.
- Berkshire Psychoanalytic Institute (BPI) was founded in 2001 in Stockbridge, Massachusetts. (Note: "About BPI". Berkshire Psychoanalytic Institute. 2021-12-30 [2012-11-17].)
- Boston Graduate School of Psychoanalysis was founded in 1973. Its main campus is in Brookline, Massachusetts.
- Boston Psychoanalytic Society and Institute is the third-oldest psychoanalytic institute in the United States, founded in 1932 by Franz Alexander. It is affiliated with both APsaA and IPA.
- Center for Modern Psychoanalytic Studies (Note: "Welcome to CMPS". Center for Modern Psychoanalytic Studies.). The Center holds an absolute charter from the Board of Regents of the New York State Education Department and is recognized by New York State as a licensure-qualifying institute for those seeking license as a psychoanalyst. It is accredited by the American Board for Accreditation in Psychoanalysis and is a member institute of the National Association for the Advancement of Psychoanalysis.
- The Institute for Modern Psychoanalysis of Philadelphia (IMPP) (Formerly Philadelphia School of Psychoanalysis (PSP) until it was renamed in 2025), formed in 1971, offers accredited, online, modern psychoanalytic programs. It is accredited by the American Board for Accreditation in Psychoanalysis (ABAP).
- The Academy of Clinical and Applied Psychoanalysis (ACAP), formed in 1990, offers accredited online and in-person (at their Livingston, NJ campus) psychoanalytic programs.
- Center for Psychoanalytic Studies in Houston, Texas, began as a study group in the Houston-Galveston area in 1964, in association with the New Orleans Psychoanalytic Institute (NOPI). In 1974, it began operating as a geographical extension of the NOPI, offering full training in psychoanalysis as the Houston-Galveston Psychoanalytic School. Provisional status with APsaA was granted in 1976 and full status in May 1979 as the Houston-Galveston Psychoanalytic Institute. It has associations with Baylor College of Medicine (Houston) and the University of Texas Health Science Center at Houston, as well as affiliates in Austin and in San Antonio. (Note: "History". The Center for Psychoanalytic Studies.)
- Center for Psychotherapy and Psychoanalysis of New Jersey https://cppnj.org
- Chicago Psychoanalytic Institute (formerly Institute for Psychoanalysis until it was renamed in May 2018), is the second-oldest in the United States, founded in February 1932.
- Cleveland Psychoanalytic Center, founded in 1967.
- Columbia University Center for Psychoanalytic Training and Research was founded in 1945. It is part of the Department of Psychiatry of the Columbia University College of Physicians and Surgeons. (Note: "History". Columbia University Center for Psychoanalytic Training and Research.)
- Denver Institute for Psychoanalysis and the Denver Psychoanalytic Society were begun in the 1960s, with the first class enrolled in 1968. (Note: "Institute History". Denver Psychoanalytic Society & Institute.)
- Emory University Psychoanalytic Institute (EUPI) in Atlanta, Georgia, is a part of the Emory University School of Medicine's Department of Psychiatry and Behavioral Sciences and is affiliated with the Atlanta Psychoanalytic Society. It is also an Accredited Training Institute of the American Psychoanalytic Association (APsaA). (Note: "Emory University Psychoanalytic Institute". Atlanta Psychoanalysis.) The precursor of EUPI was founded around 1964 with classes beginning in 1965. (Note: "Individual Institute Roster". International Psychoanalytical Studies Organization.)
- Greater Kansas City and Topeka Psychoanalytic Center and Institute (GKCPI) in Kansas City, Missouri (Note: "University and Medical School Affiliations". Greater Kansas City-Topeka Psychoanalytic Center.)
- The Hannah Perkins Center for child psychoanalysis in Cleveland, Ohio.
- Harlem Family Institute (HFI) was founded in New York City in 1991 with the goal of providing psychoanalytic training for candidates from diverse backgrounds, and long-term psychotherapeutic and emotional-support for struggling and at-risk youth and their parents in New York's schools in underserved neighborhoods. (Note: "Harlem Family Institute: About the Institute". Harlem Family Institute.)
- Institute for Contemporary Psychoanalysis (ICP) in Los Angeles was founded in 1990–1991 with an emphasis on contemporary approaches to psychoanalysis, particularly Self Psychology and Intersubjective approaches. (Note: Simmons, John Galbraith. "Los Angeles Psychoanalytic Society and Institute". International Dictionary of Psychoanalysis – via Encyclopedia.com.) (Note: "About Us". Institute for Contemporary Psychoanalysis.)
- Institute of Contemporary Psychotherapy + Psychoanalysis (ICP+P) was founded in Washington, DC, in 1994 by Joseph Lichtenberg and Rosemary Segalla. (Note: "Culture + Mission + History". Institute of Contemporary Psychotherapy and Psychoanalysis. 2017-10-04 [2016-10-13].)
- Institute for Psychoanalytic Training and Research (IPTAR) in New York City was founded in 1958. (Note: "Our History – IPTAR". Institute for Psychoanalytic Training and Research.)
- Institute for the Psychoanalytic Study of Subjectivity (IPSS) was founded in 1987 in New York City by George Atwood, James Fosshage, Frank Lachmann, and Robert Stolorow. (Note: "History". The Institute for the Psychoanalytic Study of Subjectivity.)
- Los Angeles Institute and Society for Psychoanalytic Studies (LAISPS) was founded in 1970. (Note: "Our History". Los Angeles Institute and Society for Psychoanalytic Studies.)
- National Psychological Association for Psychoanalysis (NPAP) was established in New York City by Theodore Reik in 1948, in response to the controversy over lay analysis and the question of the training of psychoanalysts in the States. It continues to have a Reikian orientation to psychoanalysis. (Note: "Training". National Psychological Association For Psychoanalysis.)
- New Center for Psychoanalysis (NCP) in Los Angeles was created in 2005 from the merger of two institutes: the Los Angeles Psychoanalytic Society and Institute (LAPSI) and the Southern California Psychoanalytic Institute and Society (SCPIS). These, in turn, were the two oldest and largest successors to the original Los Angeles Institute. The New Center is affiliated with both APsaA and IPA.
- Newport Center for Psychoanalytic Studies was begun in Newport Beach, California, in 1975 by psychologist Lawrence Hedges as a series of study groups and visiting lecturers. It was formally chartered as an educational institute in 1983. (Note: "Our History". Newport Psychoanalytic Institute.)
- New Jersey Institute for Training in Psychoanalyses, founded in 1972. We are the oldest psychoanalytic institute in New Jersey. https://njinstitute.com/
- New York Psychoanalytic Society & Institute, founded in 1911 by Abraham Brill, is the oldest psychoanalytic organization in the United States. (Note: "history - NYPSI". New York Psychoanalytic Society & Institute.) (Note: Knafo, Saki (2007-09-09). "Patching Up the Frayed Couch". The New York Times.)
- New York University Postdoctoral Program in Psychotherapy and Psychoanalysis was established at NYU by Bernard N. Kalinkowitz in 1961.
- Object Relations Institute for Psychotherapy and Psychoanalysis (ORI) was founded in 1991, with curriculum based on extension of the British Object Relations psychoanalytic school, and it is chartered by NYS Board of Regents in 1993. (Note: "About the Object Relations Institute for Psychotherapy & Psychoanalysis, ORI". Object Relations Institute.)
- Northern California Society for Psychoanalytic Psychology (NCSPP) is based in San Anselmo, California, in the San Francisco Bay Area. (Note: "History of NCSPP". Northern California Society for Psychoanalytic Psychology.)
- Oklahoma Society for Psychoanalytic Studies was founded in 1989. (Note: "About OSPS". Oklahoma Society for Psychoanalytic Studies.)
- Oregon Psychoanalytic Center (OPC) in Portland, Oregon (Note: "OPC Background & Traditions". Oregon Psychoanalytic Center.)
- Psychoanalytic Institute of New England (PINE) (Note: "PINE Analysis - Center for Psychoanalysis". PINE Psychoanalytic Center.)
- Psychoanalytic Center of California (PCC) was established in Los Angeles in the 1980s with a specific focus on the works of Melanie Klein and her associates; it joined the International Psychoanalytical Association in 1989.
- Psychoanalytic Center of Philadelphia(PCOP) was established in 2000 by the merger of the Philadelphia Association for Psychoanalysis and the Philadelphia Psychoanalytic Institute and Society. It is an Approved Institute of the American Psychoanalytic Association and provides training in Psychoanalysis and Psychotherapy
- Psychoanalytic Institute of Northern California (PINC) was founded in 1989 and became a component society of the IPA in July 2009. (Note: "Home". Psychoanalytic Institute of Northern California.)
- Psychoanalytic Psychotherapy Study Center (PPSC), with a Four-Year Program in Psychoanalysis, was founded in New York in 1986. It is a member institute of the National Association for the Advancement of Psychoanalysis. (Note: "The PPSC Mission". Psychoanalytic Psychotherapy Study Center.) (Note: "Member Institutes". National Association for the Advancement of Psychoanalysis (NAAP).)
- St. Louis Psychoanalytic Institute (Note: "Welcome to the Institute". St. Louis Psychoanalytic Institute. 2019-10-22.)
- San Diego Psychoanalytic Center (SDPC) (Note: "Our History". San Diego Psychoanalytic Center.)
- San Francisco Center for Psychoanalysis was founded in 1942 as California Psychoanalytic Society and was later renamed the San Francisco Psychoanalytic Society and Institute. In 2007, it was combined with the San Francisco Foundation for Psychoanalysis that was founded in 1991. The new entity is called the San Francisco Center for Psychoanalysis. (Note: "About SFCP". San Francisco Center for Psychoanalysis.) The Sacramento Psychoanalytic Society is an affiliate of the San Francisco Center for Psychoanalysis. (Note: "What is Psychoanalysis?". Sacramento Psychoanalytic Society.)
- Seattle Psychoanalytic Society & Institute (SPSI) in Seattle, Washington, began as the Seattle Psychoanalytic Training Center in 1946. In 1964, the Seattle Psychoanalytic Society & Institute (SPSI) gained independent status as an Institute of the American Psychoanalytic Association. (Note: "About SPSI". Seattle Psychoanalytic Society & Institute.)
- Western New England Institute for Psychoanalysis in New Haven, Connecticut, was established provisionally in 1952 and fully recognized in 1956 by the American Psychoanalytic Association. (Note: "The Western New England Institute for Psychoanalysis". Western New England Institute for Psychoanalysis / The Western New England Psychoanalytic Society.)
- William Alanson White Institute (WAWI) was founded in 1943 in New York City. (Note: "Our History". William Alanson White Institute.) Founding members were Erich Fromm and Clara Thompson, joined by Harry Stack Sullivan, Frieda Fromm-Reichmann, David Rioch and Janet Rioch.
- The National Association for the Advancement of Psychoanalysis (NAAP), founded in 1972, with the purpose to unite the various schools of psychoanalytic thought and to ensure the independence, advancement, recognition, and sustainability of the profession of psychoanalysis.
- The American Board for Accreditation in Psychoanalysis (ABAP), established in 1997, in order to achieve autonomy between accreditation and membership society functions. For nearly twenty-five years, ABAP has been independently fostering quality improvement, evaluating, and accrediting a diverse group of psychoanalytic training programs. Those that meet ABAP’s Standards for Accreditation are accredited members of the Assembly of Psychoanalytic Institutes.

== See also ==
- List of schools of psychoanalysis
