= Western New England Institute for Psychoanalysis =

American psychoanalysis institute

Coordinates: 41.3138°N 72.9204°W

The Western New England Institute for Psychoanalysis is a New Haven, Connecticut based institute which specializes in the training of the psychoanalysis of children, adolescents, and adults. Institute officials also oversee the Western New England Psychoanalytic Society, which sponsors the New Haven Psychoanalytic Research Training Program and the Muriel Gardiner Program. The Western New England Institute for Psychoanalysis was established provisionally in 1952 and fully recognized in 1956 by the American Psychoanalytic Association. Jonathan Lear, Sidney H. Phillips, Donald J. Cohen, Steven R. Marans and Linda C. Mayes and have all worked as psychoanalysts at the institute.
