= Judd Marmor =

American psychiatrist (1910-2003)

- Born: May 2, 1910; London, England, United Kingdom
- Died: December 16, 2003 (aged 93); Los Angeles, California, United States
- Education: Columbia College (BA); Columbia University College of Physicians & Surgeons (MD)
- Occupations: Psychoanalyst, psychiatrist, and professor
- Spouse: Katherine Marmor

Judd Marmor (May 2, 1910 – December 16, 2003) was an American psychoanalyst and psychiatrist known for his role in removing homosexuality from the American Psychiatric Association's Diagnostic and Statistical Manual of Mental Disorders.

== Life and career ==
Marmor was born in London on May 2, 1910. In 1912, he emigrated with his family and moved to Chicago, Illinois. Marmor attended Columbia University for his undergraduate and medical degrees, graduating with a Bachelor's of Arts in 1930 and a Doctor of Medicine in 1933 Marmor trained in psychiatry and neurology, and also studied at the New York Psychoanalytic Institute. After training he married Katherina Stern (from Hungary) who got a Ph.D. in psychology in 1979. His son Michael F. Marmor was born in 1941, became a physician, and was for many years a professor of ophthalmology at the Stanford University School of Medicine. Marmor moved to Los Angeles in 1946, after serving in the Navy during World War II.

In the early 1960s, Marmor supported the then-controversial opinion that homosexuality was a type of sexual behavior, not a deviation or disorder. He also opposed the prevailing opinion that homosexuality was caused from a dysfunctional upbringing. Marmor's stance on homosexuality was particularly influential because Marmor was a widely respected and mainstream psychoanalyst; not a peripheral figure like most others speaking to the issue. In the mid-1960s, Marmor and Evelyn Hooker began collaborating on depathologizing homosexuality. Hooker contributed a chapter to Marmor's 1965 book Sexual Inversion: The Multiple Roots of Homosexuality and recruited him for a task force on homosexuality sponsored by the National Institute of Mental Health. Marmor continued to support his position that homosexuality did not meet the criteria applied for a mental illness while serving as the vice president of the American Psychiatric Association. In 1974, the members of the American Psychiatric Association voted to remove homosexuality from the Diagnostic and Statistical Manual of Mental Disorders, a move that was critical in the advancement of gay rights. Later that year, Marmor was elected president of the American Psychiatric Association.

Marmor also influenced the movement in psychiatry away from pure psychoanalysis and towards shorter-term psychotherapy, and emphasized the need for putting psychoanalysis on a sound scientific basis.

Marmor operated a private psychiatry practice in Los Angeles, where he was popular among the Hollywood elite. He continued to practice until his death in 2003.

Marmor served as director of psychiatry at Cedars-Sinai Medical Center from 1965 to 1972. He was the Franz Alexander Professor of Psychiatry at the University of Southern California from 1972 to 1980, and an adjunct professor of psychiatry at the University of California, Los Angeles from 1980 to 1985. In addition to serving as president of the American Psychiatric Association, Marmor was also at times president of the American Academy of Psychoanalysis, the Group for the Advancement of Psychiatry, and the Southern California Psychoanalytic Society and Institute.

Marmor was a prolific author, writing over 350 scientific papers and writing or editing eight books. He was also an essayist who wrote on topics including civil rights and politics, publishing essays opposing McCarthyism, the nuclear bomb, and the Vietnam War.

Marmor and his wife collected Pop Art for decades in Los Angeles, and a large collection was given to the Cantor Art Center at Stanford University. Marmor was married to Katherine Marmor until her death in 1999, and he died on December 16, 2003.
