= Ernst Simmel =

German-American neurologist and psychoanalyst

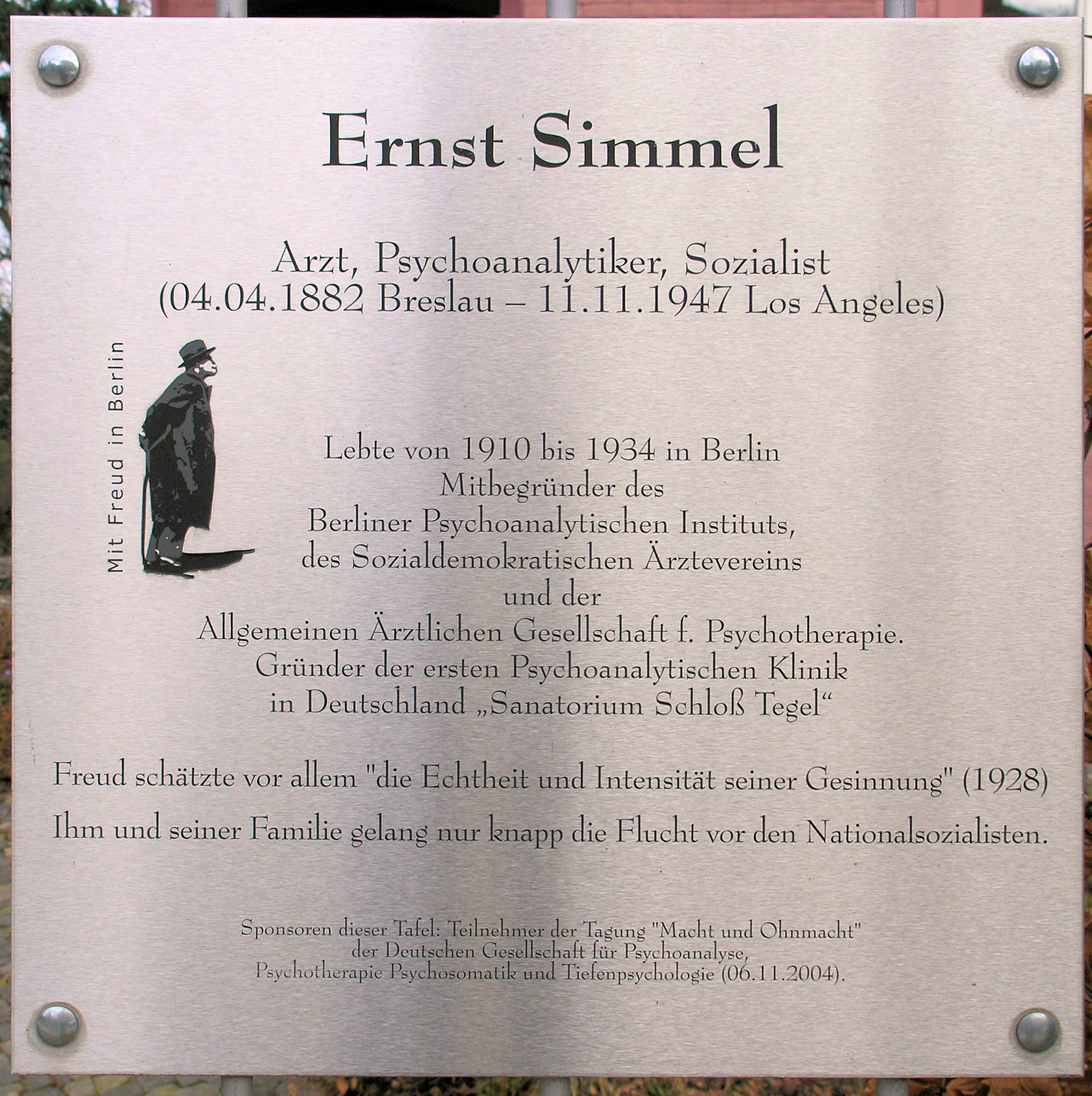
Memorial plaque, Ernst Simmel, Eichenallee 23, Berlin-Westend, Germany

Ernst Simmel (/ˈzɪməl/; German: [ˈzɪml̩]; 4 April 1882 – 11 November 1947) was a German-American neurologist and psychoanalyst.

== Life ==
Born in Breslau (Wrocław), Silesia to a secular Jewish background, Simmel moved to Berlin as a child. He studied medicine and psychiatry in Berlin and Rostock. He graduated in medicine in 1908, with a dissertation on dementia praecox. In 1910 he married Alice Seckelson. In 1913 alongside Karl Kollwitz and Ignaz Zadek he helped found the Society of Socialist Physicians (VSÄ), and became one of the pioneers of Social Medicine.

During World War I he headed a hospital for psychiatric casualties of war in Posen; self-taught in psychoanalysis, he introduced the use of psychodynamic categories there. His pioneering work on the treatment of war neurosis with psychoanalytic methods drew him to the attention of Sigmund Freud, who would build explicitly on his work in Group Psychology and the Analysis of the Ego (1921).

After the war, Simmel received a training analysis with Karl Abraham—another leading analyst who rated the serious young physician very highly—and himself provided the writer Alfred Döblin with training analysis. Simmel helped Abraham and Max Eitingon found the Berlin Psychoanalytic Institute in 1920, the world's first psychoanalytic clinic providing free analytic help for indigent patients: between 1920 and 1930, 1,955 consultations took place there, 721 resulting in some form of psychoanalysis. Simmel had played a model role in the institution by insisting from the start on confidentiality and equal treatment for non-paying as for paying analysands.

Simmel was President of the Society of Socialist Physicians from 1924 to 1933, and President of the Berlin Psychoanalytic Society from 1926 to 1930. In 1927 he founded a sanatorium at Tegel Palace in Tegel, which lasted until bankruptcy forced the sanitorium to close in 1931. Freud was his guest there during several visits to Berlin, and the sanatorium for five years played an innovative role in new clinical developments. In 1929 he married his second wife, Hertha Brüggemann.

Emigrating to the United States to escape Hitler in 1934, he was briefly at the Topeka Psychoanalytic Institute before settling in Los Angeles, where he was a founding member of what became the Los Angeles Psychoanalytic Society and Institute (LAPSI).

Simmel died in Los Angeles.

== Studies ==
Simmel was one of the discoverers of the "war neuroses", and stressed the part played in them by both the superego and the revival of forgotten infantile traumas. He also did pioneering work on gambling, seeing it as a regressive attempt to obtain by force sought after narcissistic supply. Simmel maintained that "on the developmental path of mankind, games of chance are a reservoir for the anal-sadistic impulses held in a state of repression", and that gambling served to satisfy the "bisexual ideal which the Narcissus finds in himself".

Among other topics covered in the ten or so papers he published between 1918 and 1937 were screen memories; sadism in sex murderers; psychosomatic defences against psychosis; and hypochondriasis. With respect to the latter, he focused on the role of introjects in affecting the hypochondriacally disturbed part of the body, writing that: "The introjected parental substitute becomes the morbid material which must be eliminated if the patient is to recover".

Simmel also pioneered the psychoanalytic study of alcoholism, considering alcoholic exaltation as an artificial mania, and in his last paper (1948) urging future co-operation intreatment with Alcoholics Anonymous.

Through such studies, Simmel played a significant part in ensuring that psychoanalytic theory was extended from individual diseases to include cultural issues and social situations. For all his theoretical radicalism, however, Simmel's reputation as an analyst was for an austere and scrupulously meticulous analytic technique.

=== Antisemitism study ===
One of Simmel's abiding contributions was made in the 1946 anthology on antisemitism—a collaborative work of psychoanalysts and social theorists based on the contributions to a 1944 symposium held in San Francisco. Other contributors were Theodor W. Adorno, Bernhard Berliner, Otto Fenichel, Else Frenkel-Brunswik, Max Horkheimer and Douglass W. Orr.

In Simmel's own paper—"Anti-Semitism and mass psychopathology"—he interprets antisemitism on the basis of Freud's critical exploration of myth in his book Moses and Monotheism (1939). Simmel explained the antisemitic complex in terms of irrational impulses in individuals and groups which were aimed at overcoming pathological disorders. A reversion to infantile modes of denying external reality (reaching back to stages of development dominated by the death drive), in Simmel's model antisemitism appeared as a mass psychosis that nevertheless enabled the individual to compensate for psychological deficits, in such a way as to remain socially integrated and relatively intact psychologically: "The flight into mass psychosis is not only a flight from reality but also from individual insanity".

== Papers ==
Simmel's papers are held at the Library of the New Center for Psychoanalysis in Los Angeles, and in special collections at UCLA.

== See also ==
- Alfred Adler
- Anti-racism
- Sandor Rado
- W. H. R. Rivers

== Works ==
- Kriegs-Neurosen und "Psychisches Trauma", Munich & Leipzig: Otto Nemnich, 1918.
- 'On the Psychoanalysis of War Neurosis', 1919. Reprinted in Ernst Simmel, Karl Abraham, Sandor Ferenczi and Ernest Jones, On the psychoanalysis and the war neuroses. London: International Psychoanalytic Press., 1921.
- 'Psychoanalysis and the Masses', 1919.
- 'Über die Psychogenese von Organstörungen und ihre psychoanalytische Behandlung'. In Report on the sixth general medical congress for psychotherapy (p. 56-65; 251–260). Leipzig: Hirzel, 1931
- 'The psychoanalytic sanitarium and the psychoanalytic movement'. Bulletin of the Menninger Clinic 1 (1937) 133–143.
- 'Self-preservation and the death instinct'. Psychoanalytic Quarterly 13 (1944), 160–185.
- (ed.) Anti-Semitism: A social disease. New York: International Universities Press, 1946.
- Psychoanalyse und ihre Anwendungen. Frankfurt-am-Main: S. Fischer, 1993
