= The Question of Lay Analysis =

1926 book by Sigmund Freud

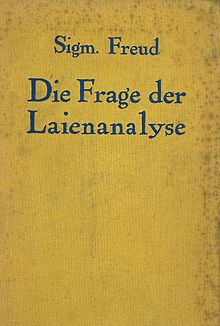
- The German edition
- Author: Sigmund Freud
- Original title: Die Frage der Laienanalyse
- Language: German

The Question of Lay Analysis (German: Die Frage der Laienanalyse) is a 1926 book by Sigmund Freud, the founder of psychoanalysis, advocating the right of non-doctors, or 'lay' people, to be psychoanalysts. It was written in response to Theodore Reik's being prosecuted for being a non-medical, or lay, analyst in Austria.

It is in this book that Freud compares the sexual life of adult women to a "dark continent":

We know less about the sexual life of little girls than of boys. But we need not feel ashamed of this distinction; after all, the sexual life of adult females is a dark continent [original in English] for psychology.
