= Theodor Reik =

Austrian-American psychoanalyst (1888–1969)

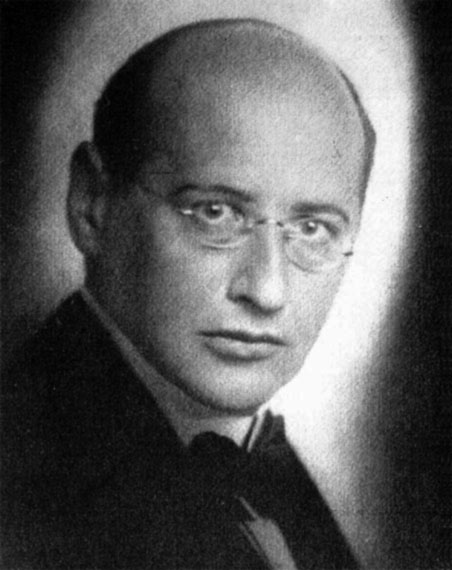
- Born: 12 May 1888; Vienna, Austria-Hungary
- Died: 31 December 1969 (aged 81); New York City, U.S.
- Education: University of Vienna (PhD, 1912)

Theodor Reik (Austrian German: [raɪk]; 12 May 1888 – 31 December 1969) was a psychoanalyst who trained as one of Freud's first students in Vienna, Austria, and was a pioneer of lay analysis in the United States.

== Education and career ==
=== Psychology ===
Reik received a Ph.D. degree in psychology from the University of Vienna in 1912 with his dissertation Flaubert und seine „Versuchung des heiligen Antonius“ (Flaubert and his "Temptation of Saint Anthony").

=== Psychoanalysis ===
After receiving his doctorate, Reik devoted several years to studying psychoanalysis with Sigmund Freud. Freud financially supported Reik and his family during his psychoanalytic training. During this time, Reik was analyzed by Karl Abraham. Reik, who was Jewish, emigrated from Germany to the Netherlands in 1934 and to the United States in 1938 in flight from Nazism. In 1944, he became a naturalized citizen of the United States.

== War and Viennese aftermath ==
During the First World War, Reik was mobilized and had to face up to the experience of unbearable helplessness found in trench-warfare. Out of that experience, Reik contributed to a paper of Freud, published in 1919, "The Uncanny" (referring, in part, to that which is horrifying); and some years later, in a text called "The Dread" written in 1924 and published in 1929. Reik makes a link between the various aspects of traumatic neurosis, as disseminated in the written papers of Freud, and suggests his own further analysis; Freud recognized the paper's pertinence. In a book, published in 1935, Reik discusses the dread of confronting thoughts, from the point of view of the psychoanalyst (Tréhel, G. 2012).

When peace was finally restored, a committee directed by Julius Tandler was organized in Vienna to investigate committed felonies; Julius Wagner von Jauregg participated as a member. At that time, the medical practice in places directed by Wagner von Jauregg and Arnold Durig had been discredited by a former patient, Walter Kauders. Sigmund Freud was appointed as an expert witness on the medical care provided for war neurotics. In February 1920, the committee gave its opinion and, in October 1920, formally presented its conclusions.

Another matter shook up the Austrian capital. In November 1924, Durig asked Freud to write an expert evaluation about the question of lay analysis—that is, analysis practiced by individuals who are not medical doctors. In December 1924, during a session of the Vienna Health State Board, Wagner von Jauregg asked for a list of the institutions using psychoanalysis. Reik was identified as not medically certified. In February 1925, he was, by official decree, forbidden to continue practising medicine; and in 1926, Newton Murphy, Reik's former patient, turned against him, suing him for harmful treatment— Freud publicly took up Reik's defence, reacting by writing to Tandler. The two affairs presented similarities. Specifically, they took place during the same period and in the same city, Vienna; they each concerned the practice of caregivers; and they implicated the same individuals who were in authority.

Among those treated by Reik in his Viennese period was the philosopher Frank P. Ramsey, during a prolonged stay in Vienna for that purpose.

== American developments ==
Once in the United States, Reik found himself rejected from the dominant community of medical psychoanalysts because he did not possess an M.D. degree.

In response, he went on to found one of the first psychoanalytic training centers for psychologists, the National Psychological Association for Psychoanalysis, which remains one of the largest and best-known psychoanalytic training institutes in New York City.

As part of Reik's conflict with the medical psychoanalysis community, he participated in the first lawsuit which helped define and legitimize the practice of psychoanalysis by non-physicians. His legacy for non-medical psychoanalysis in the US is accordingly important: that the training of non-medical analysts, such as psychologists and social workers, is now largely accepted, is significantly due to Reik's efforts.

== Writings and influence ==
Reik is best known for psychoanalytic studies of psychotherapeutic listening, masochism, criminology, literature, and religion.

- Reik's first major book was The Compulsion to Confess (1925), in which he argued that neurotic symptoms such as blushing and stuttering can be seen as unconscious confessions that express the patient's repressed impulses while also punishing the patient for communicating these impulses. Reik further explored this theme in The Unknown Murderer (1932), in which he examined the process of psychologically profiling unknown criminals. He argued out that because of unconscious guilt, criminals often leave clues that can lead to their identification and arrest.
- In Masochism in Modern Man (1941), Reik argues that patients who engage in self-punishing or provocative behavior do so in order to demonstrate their emotional fortitude, induce guilt in others, and achieve a sense of "victory through defeat", while in Myth and Guilt (1957), Reik investigated the role of guilt and masochism in religion. The original name of TES, the first BDSM organization founded in the United States, formerly known as The Eulenspiegel Society, was inspired by a passage in Masochism in Modern Man (1941). In that passage Reik argues that patients who engage in self-punishing or provocative behavior do so in order to demonstrate their emotional fortitude, induce guilt in others, and achieve a sense of "victory through defeat". Reik also describes Till Eulenspiegel's "peculiar" behavior—he enjoys walking uphill, and feels "dejected" walking downhill—and compares it to a "paradox reminiscent of masochism", because Till Eulenspiegel "gladly submits to discomfort, enjoys it, even transforms it into pleasure".
- In Ritual: Four Psychoanalytic Studies (1946), he uses psychoanalysis to shed light on the meaning of couvade, puberty rites, and the Jewish rituals of Yom Kippur and shofar. His studies of Jewish humour - 'On the Nature of Jewish Wit' (1940) and Jewish Wit (1962) - take a dark, almost tragic view of its underpinnings which may be linked to the experience of the Second World War: "there lurks behind the comic façade not merely something serious, as in other witticisms, but something horrible".
- Reik's most famous book, Listening with the Third Ear (1948), describes how psychoanalysts intuitively use their own unconscious minds to detect and decipher the unconscious wishes and fantasies of their patients. According to Reik, analysts come to understand patients most deeply by examining their own unconscious intuitions about their patients. In his psychoanalytic autobiography Fragments of a Great Confession (1949), Reik turned a psychoanalytic ear toward his own life, interpreting his inner conflicts and their influence on his writing and relationships.
- The Secret Self (1952) comprises a number of essays of psychoanalytic literary criticism, in which Reik tried to decipher the unconscious fantasies and impulses lying beneath literary works. In this book, Reik continued to develop his interest in the relationship between his own personality and his work, exploring how his internal conflicts shaped his interpretations of literary works.
- In "The Creation of Woman" Reik investigated and analyzed the second story of the creation of Eve in Genesis from Adam's rib. He supported his conclusion that the genders were reversed. It is not Eve that is born from Adam's rib, according to Reik, it is the second birth of Adam into the world of men, leaving the world of the mother. His book "Ritual" contains evidence to support how secret keeping and 'initiation rites' in native societies in modern times are about leaving the world of the feminine, entering the masculine world. He also explored the power of the Jocasta complex, a surfeiting of mothering, in preventing such male independence.
- Reik's article on 'Surprise' in psychoanalysis proved significant for W. R. Bion, who considered surprise at the unknown an essential element of progress in analysis. His emphasis on being open to surprise, and the arts of listening in analysis were taken up by the French psychoanalytic theorist Jacques Lacan, and anticipated recent developments in US psychoanalysis, such as its current emphasis on intersubjectivity and countertransference.
- Reik presented a forceful criticism of traditional Freudian theory in A Psychologist Looks at Love (1944). Freud had believed that love is always based on some form of sexual desire. Reik argued, to the contrary, that love and lust are distinct motivational forces.

Reik also has the earliest attestation of the famous quote, "History does not repeat itself, but it rhymes". With the full original quote being "It has been said that history repeats itself. This is perhaps not quite correct; it merely rhymes."

== Publications ==
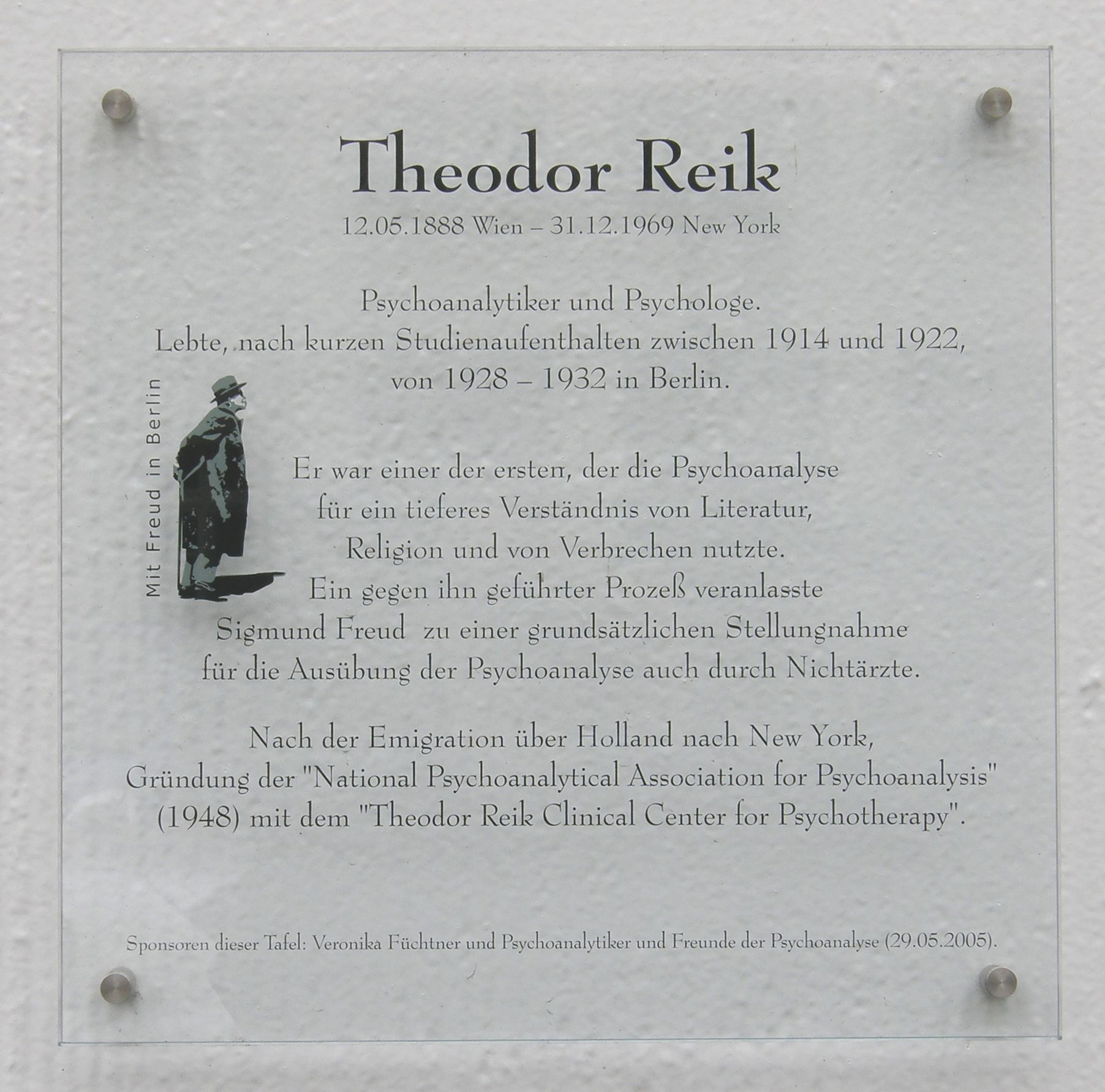
Memorial plaque, Berlin

- 1912 – Flaubert und seine "Versuchung des heiligen Antonius". Doctoral thesis, University of Vienna.
- 1923 – Der eigene und der fremde Gott. Neuausgabe: Der eigene und der fremde Gott: zur Psychoanalyse d. religiösen Entwicklung, Mit e. Vorw. z. Neuausg. von Alexander Mitscherlich, Frankfurt (am Main): Suhrkamp, 1975.
- 1925/1959 – The Compulsion to Confess. In J. Farrar (Ed) The compulsion to confess and the need for punishment. (pp. 176–356). New York: Farrar, Straus, and Cudahy.
- 1932/1959 – The Unknown Murderer. In J. Farrar (Ed) The compulsion to confess and the need for punishment. (pp. 3–173). New York: Farrar, Straus, and Cudahy.
- 1937 – Surprise and the Psycho-Analyst: On the Conjecture and Comprehension of Unconscious Process. New York: E. P. Dutton and Company.
- 1941 – Masochism In Modern Man. New York: Toronto, Farrar & Rinehart.
- 1944/1974 – A Psychologist Looks at Love. In M. Sherman (Ed.) Of Love and Lust. (pp. 1–194). New York: Jason Aronson.
- 1946 – Ritual: Four Psychoanalytic Studies. 1962 Grove Press edition.
- 1948 – Listening with the Third Ear: The inner experience of a psychoanalyst. New York: Grove Press.
- 1952 – The Secret Self. New York: Farrar, Straus and Young.
- 1953 – The Haunting Melody: Psychoanalytic Experiences in Life and Music. New York: Farrar, Straus and Young.
- 1957 – Myth and Guilt. New York: George Braziller.
- 1959 – Mystery on the Mountain: The Drama of the Sinai Revelation. New York: Harper & Brothers, Publishers.
- 1960 – The Creation of Woman: A Psychoanalytic Inquiry into the Myth of Eve. New York: George Braziller.
- 1961 – The Temptation. New York: George Braziller.
- 1962 – Jewish Wit. New York: Gamut Press.
- 1963 - The Need To Be Loved. New York: H Wolff.
- 1964 – Voices From the Inaudible: The Patients Speak. New York: Farrar, Straus and Company.
- 1965 - Curiosity of the Self: illusions we have about ourselves New York: Farrar, Straus & Giroux
- 1966 – The many faces of sex: observations of an old psychoanalyst. New York: Farrar, Straus & Giroux

== See also ==
- Dorothy Burlingham
- Negative capability
- The Question of Lay Analysis
