= Boston Graduate School of Psychoanalysis =

Private school in Brookline, MA

Boston Graduate School of Psychoanalysis is a private educational institution that focuses on training psychoanalysts, particularly in the field of modern psychoanalysis. Founded in 1973, it only awards graduate degrees. Its main campus is in Brookline, Massachusetts.

== Accreditation ==
The Boston Graduate School of Psychoanalysis, including its branch campus in New York, is accredited by the New England Association of Schools and Colleges, Inc. through its Commission on Institutions of Higher Education. It first received accreditation from the New England Association of Schools and Colleges (NEASC) in 1995, which opened psychoanalytic study to any qualified and engaged student irrespective of prior courses of study.

Boston Graduate School of Psychoanalysis is the only regionally accredited school of psychoanalytic studies in the United States to grant graduate degrees.
