= Otto Fenichel =

Austrian psychoanalyst (1897–1946)

Otto Fenichel (German: [ˈfeːnɪçl̩]; 2 December 1897, Vienna – 22 January 1946, Los Angeles) was an Austrian psychoanalyst of the so-called "second generation". He was born into a prominent family of Jewish lawyers.

== Education and psychoanalytic affiliations ==
Otto Fenichel started studying medicine in 1915 in Vienna. Already as a very young man, when still in school, he was attracted by the circle of psychoanalysts around Freud. During the years 1915 and 1919, he attended lectures by Freud, and as early as 1920, aged 23, he became a member of the Vienna Psychoanalytic Society.

In 1922, Fenichel moved to Berlin. During his Berlin time, until 1934, he was a member of a group of Socialist and/or Marxist psychoanalysts (with Siegfried Bernfeld, Erich Fromm, Wilhelm Reich, Ernst Simmel, Frances Deri and others). After his emigration – 1934 to Oslo, 1935 to Prague, 1938 to Los Angeles – he organized the contact between the worldwide scattered Marxist psychoanalysts by means of top secret newsletters ("Rundbriefe").

Those Rundbriefe can be counted among the most important documents pertaining to the problematic history of psychoanalysis between 1934 and 1945, especially in regard to the problem of the expulsion of Wilhelm Reich from the International Psychoanalytic Association in 1934. In Los Angeles, Fenichel joined existing psychoanalytic circles and later helped found the Los Angeles Psychoanalytic Society and Institute. In Los Angeles, his patients training to become psychoanalysts included Ralph Greenson.

== Writings ==
Fenichel was a prolific writer on psychoanalysis, and published some forty articles between "Introjektion und Kastrationkomplex" (1925) and "Neurotic Acting Out" (1945). Among some of the areas he contributed to were female sexuality, the feeling of triumph, and the antecedents of the Oedipus complex. He also published an influential technical manual, Problems of Psychoanalytic Technique (1939).

Three interwar papers on female sexuality, attracted Freud's own attention: he wrote of the first that "Fenichel (1930) rightly emphasizes the difficulty of recognizing in the material produced in analysis what parts of it represent the unchanged content of the pre-Oedipus phase and what parts have been distorted by regression". His 1936 article on the symbolic equation of Girl and Phallus subsequently became a launch pad for Jacques Lacan.

In his 1939 article "Trophy and Triumph", Fenichel pointed out that the feeling of triumph "results from the removal of anxiety and inhibition by the winning of a trophy", but added that as "the trophy is a super-ego derivative since it is a symbol of parental authority [...] it threatens the ego in the same way that the super-ego threatens the ego".

Building on his own work, and the contributions of his peers and predecessors, Fenichel produced his encyclopedic textbook of 1945: "For countless students and professionals Fenichel is synonymous with his Psychoanalytic Theory of Neurosis; and this text is regarded as synonymous with reliable and comprehensive psychoanalytic knowledge." Nevertheless, the work was not uncontroversial, challenging among others the findings of Melanie Klein, the neo-Freudians and much of the work of Franz Alexander, as well as displaying Fenichel's continuing Marxist affiliation.

== Criticism ==
Harold Bloom called Fenichel the "grim encyclopaedist of the Freudian psychodynamics", but it was precisely the encyclopedic aspect of his work that evoked the criticism of Lacan.

Comparing Fenichel's work to "an enumeration of the 'main sewer' type", Lacan argued for a distinction between a catalogue of past interpretations, and the actual job of finding the mutative interpretation within the actual session. Lacan also criticised Fenichel's use of organic stages of development in his writing; while others saw Fenichel as oversimplifying his accounts of neurosis by categorical taxonomies.

Although Fenichel himself had warned from the start of The Psychoanalytic Theory of Neurosis that he was only offering illustrative examples, not case histories, he may have unwittingly contributed to the vice of attempting to mastermind, not follow and learn from, the analytic process.

== Published works ==
- Otto Fenichel: Psychoanalysis as the Nucleus of a Future Dialectical-Materialistic Psychology (1934). In: American Imago, Vol. 24. (1967), pp. 290–311
- Otto Fenichel: The Psychoanalytic Theory of Neurosis. 3 vols, 1945
- Otto Fenichel: 119 Rundbriefe. Hg. Johannes Reichmayr und Elke Mühlleitner, 2 Bände, Frankfurt: Stroemfeld 1998
- Otto Fenichel et al. eds., Collected Papers of Otto Fenichel (1987).

== See also ==
- Apprentice complex
- Counterphobic attitude
- Healthy narcissism
- Narcissistic rage and narcissistic injury
- Narcissistic supply
- Wilhelm Reich
