= National Psychological Association for Psychoanalysis =

American institution

The National Psychological Association for Psychoanalysis (NPAP) is an institution in New York City founded by Theodore Reik in 1948, established in response to the controversy over lay analysis and the question of the training of psychoanalysts in the United States.

Following the lead established by Sigmund Freud, the NPAP offers training to the three core disciplines of medicine, social work, and psychology, as well as to graduates from the humanities.

Over the following decades, dissensions emerged in the organization, and other non-medical training institutions were set up in the United States.

== Ideology ==
The organization sees itself as a vibrant professional association of analysts representing a diversity of theories that comprise contemporary psychoanalytic inquiry. The NPAP's diverse membership is active in research, publication, legislation, public education, and cultural affairs, thus ensuring a psychoanalytic contribution to the community at large. The NPAP also publishes the journal The Psychoanalytic Review, the oldest continuously published psychoanalytic journal in the United States.

The Institute offers psychoanalytic training designed to prepare candidates for the professional practice of psychoanalysis.
