= American Psychoanalytic Association =

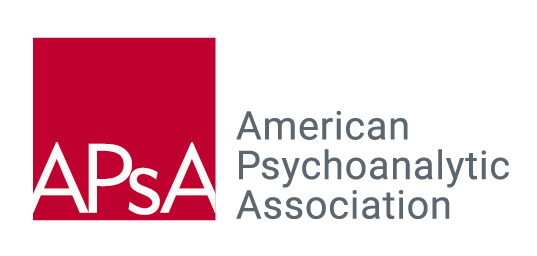
- Formation: 1911; 115 years ago
- Founders: James Jackson Putnam; Ernest Jones; Trigant Burrow; Ralph C. Hamill; John T. MacCurdy; Adolf Meyer; G. Lane Taneyhill; G. Alexander Young
- Founded at: Baltimore, Maryland, US
- Headquarters: New York City, New York, US
- Members: 3,000
- President: Dan Prezant
- President-elect: Jeff Taxman
- Executive Director: Tom Newman
- Website: www.apsa.org

The American Psychoanalytic Association (APsA) is an association of psychoanalysts in the United States. APsA serves as a scientific and professional organization with a focus on education, research, and membership development.

APsA comprises 34 training institutes and 38 affiliate societies. Individual mental health practitioners, academics, and researchers who are not affiliated with a psychoanalytic institute or society may belong as associate members. At the association's biannual meetings held in February and June, members convene to exchange ideas, present research, and discuss training and membership issues. APsA has over 3,000 members, including psychiatrists, clinical psychologists and experimental psychologists, and social workers.

== History ==
APsA was founded in 1911 by Welsh neurologist and psychoanalyst Ernest Jones, with the support of Sigmund Freud. Other founders of the organization include Adolf Meyer, James Jackson Putnam, G. Lane Taneyhill, John T. MacCurdy, Trigant Burrow, and G. Alexander Young.

APsA is the second oldest American psychoanalytic organization, after the New York Psychoanalytic Society which was founded a few months before by Abraham Arden Brill.

=== Membership ===
Membership in APsA, from its founding in 1911 until 1989, was limited to physicians. A. A. Brill suggested this limitation according to his belief that psychoanalysis could gain acceptance in America only if it were presented as a treatment for a medical disorder. APsA held to this position even after clinical psychology became a recognized health care profession. In consequence, many members of recognized health care professions, particularly clinical psychologists, were excluded not only from membership in the American Psychoanalytic Association but also from training in its approved institutes. During and following World War II, psychoanalytic education and training were available outside the institutes of APsA. All who trained in those programs — even physicians — were excluded from APsA membership.

In the 1980s, members of the American Psychological Association joined in a successful lawsuit against APsA, challenging these policies. In 1989, APsA, along with the International Psychoanalytical Association and the New York Psychoanalytic Society and Institute, agreed to admit non-physicians for training on the same basis as physicians.

=== Relationship with LGBTQ community ===
In 1991 APsA issued a statement allowing training of gay psychoanalysts. In 1992 APsA prohibited discrimination against gay people when selecting teaching faculty. In 2019 APsA apologized for having treated homosexuality as a mental illness.

== See also ==
- Journal of the American Psychoanalytic Association
- Psychoanalytic institutes and societies in the United States
