= The Yale Herald =

Student-run newspaper of Yale University

- Type: Weekly student publication
- School: Yale University
- Editor-in-chief: Hudson Warm, Angel Hu (2026-27)
- Founded: 1986; 40 years ago
- Circulation: 2,000
- Website: yale-herald.com

The Yale Herald is a newspaper run by undergraduate students at Yale University since 1986. Published weekly, the paper covers campus and local events and aims to provide in-depth investigative reporting; it also includes essays, interviews, creative writing, opinion pieces, culture articles, and reviews. The paper has a circulation of more than 2,000 and is distributed free of charge throughout Yale’s campus.

== Notable alumni ==
=== Journalists ===
- Molly Ball, senior political correspondent, The Wall Street Journal
- Anne Barnard: Beirut bureau chief, The New York Times
- Joshua Benton: director, Nieman Journalism Lab at Harvard University
- Carl Bialik: reporter, FiveThirtyEight
- Kevin Delaney: editor-in-chief, Quartz
- Ben Greenman: novelist, staffer at The New Yorker
- Ed Park: senior editor of Amazon Publishing's Little A literary fiction imprint
- Bradley Peniston: editor, Armed Forces Journal
- Tiffany Pham: founder, Mogul
- Nathaniel Rich: senior editor, The Paris Review
- Ben Smith: journalist, The New York Times; former editor-in-chief, BuzzFeed News
- Tatiana Schlossberg: American journalist and author
- Jack Schlossberg: American writer
- Jyoti Thottam: Op-Eds business and economics editor, The New York Times; former South Asia bureau chief, Time
- Jon Wertheim: covers sports for Sports Illustrated, 60 Minutes, and the Tennis Channel.
- Jessica Winter: arts editor, Time

=== Other ===
- Peter Beinart: senior fellow, Council on Foreign Relations
- Andrew J. Gerber: Medical Director/CEO, Austen Riggs Center
- Michael Gerber, founder, The American Bystander
- John Hodgman: author, humorist, The Daily Show correspondent
- Stephen Lange Ranzini: president/CEO, University Bank
- Demetri Martin: humorist, actor
- Matt Matros: professional poker player
- Greg Pak: filmmaker, Marvel Comics writer
- Jill Savitt: executive director, Dream for Darfur
- Josh Shelov: director of original programming, NBC Sports
- Allison Silverman: executive producer, The Colbert Report
