= Chernin =

Chernin is a surname. Notable people with the surname include:

- Alexander Chernin (born 1960), Hungarian chess player
- Cayle Chernin (1947–2011), Canadian actress
- Elena Kats-Chernin (born 1957), Australian composer
- Kim Chernin (born 1940), American author
- Peter Chernin (born 1951), American businessman and investor
- Rose Chernin (1901–1995), Russian-American activist
- Velvl Chernnin (born 1958), Yiddish poet, Israeli ethnographer, translator, and literary scholar

== See also ==
- Odette Tchernine
