= Albert Rothenberg =

American psychiatrist (1930–2026)

Albert Rothenberg (June 2, 1930 – January 20, 2026) was an American psychiatrist who carried out long term research on the creative process in literature, art, science and psychotherapy. As Principal Investigator of the research project Studies in the Creative Process, Rothenberg focused on the creative processes of consensually recognized and defined creators. These have included Nobel laureates in physics, chemistry, medicine and physiology; Pulitzer Prize and other literary prize winners; and consensually designated young literary and artistic creators.

Rothenberg also practiced clinical psychiatry and was an administrator and therapist at the Yale Psychiatric Institute, New Haven, Connecticut; John Dempsey Hospital in Farmington, Connecticut; the Austen Riggs Center in Stockbridge, Massachusetts, as well as undertakinging private psychiatric outpatient practice in Chatham, New York.

== Life and career ==
=== Early life and education ===
Rothenberg was born in New York City on June 2, 1930, to Gabriel Rothenberg and Rose Goldberg Rothenberg. His father, Gabriel, was born in Romania and came to the United States at the age of seventeen. At 23 years old, Gabriel fought in the US Army during the First World War. Other than attending night school for English, Gabriel had no formal advanced education but later become a successful manufacturing businessman in Danbury, Connecticut. His mother, born in New Haven, Connecticut, was a pianist and became a principal secretary after attending a New York City secretarial school. An eldest brother died immediately after childbirth and Rothenberg's 6 1/2-year-older brother, Jerome Rothenberg, who was quite sickly as a child, survived to become a distinguished American Economist. Rothenberg attended James Madison High School in Brooklyn, New York, where he graduated as Salutatorian.

=== Career ===
As an undergraduate at Harvard College, Rothenberg majored in Social Relations and graduated with honors. There, he was influenced to pursue later research in creativity through the example and thought of psychologists Henry Murray and George Klein. His medical career began at Tufts University School of Medicine, where he was awarded both the annual Dermatology Prize and Medical Alumni Award. After graduation as doctor of medicine, he went on to pursue residency training in psychiatry at Yale University School of Medicine.

In 1960, he was appointed to the Yale Medical School faculty. During early years at Yale, he was supported in research and teaching by two successive 5-year federal Research Career Investigator Grants. There was an interruption of two years when Rothenberg served as Captain in the U.S. Army Medical Corps as Chief Psychiatrist for American military personnel in Puerto Rico and the Caribbean area. For this service, he received both a Letter of Commendation and a Certificate of Merit. He then returned to Yale Medical School, where he remained for nearly 20 years.

In 1976, Rothenberg moved to the University of Connecticut Department Of Psychiatry at Farmington, where he served as the Clinical Director and Director of Psychiatric Residency for the next three years. In 1979 he became the Director of Research at the Austen Riggs Center, an open psychiatric hospital in Stockbridge, Massachusetts, and a member of the Harvard Medical School faculty.

Rothenberg was appointed Clinical Professor of Psychiatry at Harvard in 1986. That year, he began a course of three separate research years as a Fellow at institutes for advanced study. In 1986 he was a Fellow at the Center for Advanced Study in the Behavioral Sciences at Stanford University. In 1993 he was a Fellow at the Netherlands Institute for Advanced Study in the Humanities and Social Sciences in Wassenaar, and he returned as a Fellow to CASBS in 2014.

In addition to his research on creativity, he published two novels: Living Color (2001), a story about the slashing of a famous painting in the modern art museum in Amsterdam, and Madness and Glory (2012), a story about Dr. Phillipe Pinel, the father of modern psychiatry.

=== Research ===
Rothenberg carried out controlled experimental research with young writers and artists and controlled interview investigations with outstanding prize-winning authors. He found that three interrelated cognitive processes were responsible for their creative achievements. Also, through extensive and intensive research with Nobel laureates in Physiology or Medicine, Physics, and Chemistry the same processes were found to be operating in their far-reaching and outstanding creative achievements. The three cognitive processes, all of which disrupt the past and the usual and lead to creations are:

Janusian process (previously designated as janusian thinking; derived from the Roman god Janus), consists of actively conceiving and using multiple opposite or antithetical thoughts or constructions simultaneously. The janusian process leads to creation in conceptual and verbal modalities.

Homospatial process (derived from Greek homo) consists of actively conceiving and using two or more discrete entities in the same mental space, a conception leading to the articulation of new identities. The homospatial process leads to creation primarily in the metaphoric and spatial modalities.

Sep-con articulation process consists of actively conceiving and using separation (sep) and connection (con) concomitantly. The sep-con articulation process leads to integrative effects and integration in creation.

==== Significance ====
Although, as commonly used, the term creativity has been applied to a wide range of behavior, events, and practices, these have often consisted of simply different or deviant, uncommon, or unusual occurrences. Many studies have been derived from personal intuition or anecdotes, and have often focused simply on skills, divergent thinking or employment in particular types of artistic or scientific occupations. On an operational basis, however, creativity and creative activity is positively valued, usually definitively so, and the value must be consensually validated and stand the test of time.

Moreover, creativity differs from productivity or competence alone—it consists of yielding something novel or new. Rothenberg's work and findings have consistently focused on a strict definition of creativity as the state or production of both newness and value (intrinsic or instrumental). Clear-cut results and applications of these investigations have measured, in whole or in part, all types and levels of creativity. The findings produced by his research consist, for the first time, of empirically determined highly specific and operational types of creative processes. These have been described through his work in the fields of science and literature, visual art, and psychotherapy.

=== Personal life and death ===
Rothenberg was married to Julia Johnson Rothenberg, Emerita Professor of Education at Sage Colleges and noted visual artist and musician. They divided each year between homes in the U.S. and southern France.

Rothenberg died in Pittsfield, Massachusetts on January 20, 2026, at the age of 95.

== Achievements and awards ==
- NIMH Research Career Investigator
- Fellow, American College of Psychoanalysts
- Golestan Foundation Award in Psychiatry
- Distinguished Life Fellow, American Psychiatric Association
- Guggenheim Fellowship (1974)
- Fellow, Center for Advanced Study in the Behavioral Sciences (1987, 2014)
- Nominator, Nobel Prize in Physiology or Medicine (1991-)
- Fellow, Netherlands Institute for Advanced Study (1993)

== Works and publications ==
=== Scientific ===
- Rothenberg, Albert (1971). "The Process of Janusian Thinking in Creativity". Archives of General Psychiatry. 24 (3): 195–205. doi:10.1001/archpsyc.1971.01750090001001. PMID 5542345. S2CID 1100012.
- Rothenberg, Albert (1973). "Word Association and Creativity". Psychological Reports. 33 (1): 3–12. doi:10.2466/pr0.1973.33.1.3. PMID 4728480. S2CID 6545572.
- Rothenberg, Albert (1973). "Opposite responding as a measure of creativity". Psychological Reports. 33 (1): 15–18. doi:10.2466/pr0.1973.33.1.15. PMID 4728458. S2CID 45496471.
- Rothenberg, Albert (1976). "Homospatial Thinking in Creativity". Archives of General Psychiatry. 33 (1): 17–26. doi:10.1001/archpsyc.1976.01770010005001. PMID 1247359.
- Rothenberg, A. (1980). Emerging Goddess: Creative Process in Art, Science and Other Fields. University of Chicago Press. ISBN 978-0226729480.
- Rothenberg, A.; Sobel, R.S. (1980). "Creation of literary metaphors as stimulated by superimposed versus separated visual images". Journal of Mental Imagery. 4: 77–91.
- Sobel, R. S.; Rothenberg, A. (1980). "Artistic creation as stimulated by superimposed versus separated visual images". Journal of Personality and Social Psychology. 39 (5): 953–961. doi:10.1037/0022-3514.39.5.953. PMID 7441484.
- Rothenberg, Albert; Sobel, Robert S. (1981). "Effects of Shortened Exposure Time on the Creation of Literary Metaphors as Stimulated by Superimposed versus Separated Visual Images". Perceptual and Motor Skills. 53 (3): 1007–1009. doi:10.2466/pms.1981.53.3.1007. S2CID 146629253.
- Rothenberg, Albert (1983). "Psychopathology and Creative Cognition: A Comparison of Hospitalized Patients, Nobel Laureates, and Controls". Archives of General Psychiatry. 40 (9): 937–942. doi:10.1001/archpsyc.1983.01790080019002. PMID 6615155.
- Rothenberg, Albert (1986). "Artistic creation as stimulated by superimposed versus combined-composite visual images". Journal of Personality and Social Psychology. 50 (2): 370–381. doi:10.1037/0022-3514.50.2.370. PMID 3701584.
- Rothenberg, Albert (1987). "Einstein, Bohr, and creative thinking in science". History of Science. 25 (68): 147–166. doi:10.1177/007327538702500202. S2CID 116962871.
- Rothenberg, A. (1988). "Creativity and the homospatial process. Experimental Studies". Psychiatric Clinics of North America. 11 (3): 443–459. doi:10.1016/S0193-953X(18)30492-1. PMID 3226967.
- Rothenberg, Albert (1988). The creative process of psychotherapy. New York: W W Norton. ISBN 978-0393700466.
- Rothenberg, A. (1990). "Creativity in adolescence". Psychiatric Clinics of North America. 13 (3): 415–434. doi:10.1016/S0193-953X(18)30351-4. PMID 2235691.
- Rothenberg, Albert (1990). Creativity and madness: New findings and old stereotypes. Johns Hopkins University Press. ISBN 978-0801840111.
- Rothenberg, A. (1999). "Janusian, Homospatial and Sepconic Articulation Processes". In Pritzker, Steven R.; Runco, Mark A. (eds.). Articulation. Encyclopedia of Creativity. Vol. 1 (First ed.). pp. 121–126. doi:10.1016/B978-0-12-375038-9.00128-X. ISBN 978-0123750389.
- Rothenberg, Albert (2001). "Bipolar Illness, Creativity, and Treatment". Psychiatric Quarterly. 72 (2): 131–147. doi:10.1023/a:1010367525951. PMID 11433879. S2CID 31980246.
- Rothenberg, Albert (2005). "Family Background and Genius II: Nobel Laureates in Science". Canadian Journal of Psychiatry. 50 (14): 918–925. doi:10.1177/070674370505001406. PMID 16494261. S2CID 14072567.
- Rothenberg, Albert (2006). "Essay: Creativity—the healthy muse" (PDF). The Lancet. 368 (Special): S8–S9. doi:10.1016/S0140-6736(06)69905-4. S2CID 54334596.
- Rothenberg, Albert (2008). "Rembrandt's creation of the pictorial metaphor of self". Metaphor and Symbol. 23 (2): 108–129. doi:10.1080/10926480801944269. S2CID 143783488.
- Rothenberg, A. (2011). "Janusian, Homospatial and Sepconic Articulation Processes". In Runco, Mark A.; Pritzker, Steven R. (eds.). Encyclopedia of Creativity (Second ed.). pp. 1–9. doi:10.1016/B978-0-12-375038-9.00128-X. ISBN 978-0123750389.
- Rothenberg, A. (2014). Flight from Wonder: An Investigation of Scientific Creativity. Oxford University Press. ISBN 978-0199988792.

=== Fiction ===
- Rothenberg, Albert (2001). Living Color: A Novel. York Press. ISBN 978-1896761220.
- Rothenberg, Albert (2013). Madness and Glory. Vanguard Press. ISBN 978-1843868521.
