= UIF =

UIF may refer to:

- Universal Image Format, a proprietary disk image format used by MagicISO
- .uif, a file format used by WordPerfect
- Unidad de Inteligencia Financiera (Argentina), the intelligence agency of the Argentine Ministry of Economy
- Unidad de Inteligencia Financiera (Mexico), a financial investigative agency in Mexico
- Unión de Impresores de Filipinas, in the Philippines
- Union Interlinguiste de France, an organization that promotes Interlingua in France
- United Indoor Football, an indoor American football league
- University Islamic Financial, an American financial service company which provides home and commercial financing.
- United Islamic Front, Afghanistan
- United Issarak Front, Cambodia
