= Edward Shapiro =

Edward Shapiro may refer to:

- Edward R. Shapiro, American psychiatrist
- Edward S. Shapiro, American historian
