= Robert P. Knight =

American psychoanalyst (1902–1966)

- Knight in 1949
- Born: Robert Palmer Knight; July 18, 1902; Urbana, Ohio, US
- Died: April 30, 1966 (aged 63); Stockbridge, Massachusetts, US
- Education: Oberlin College; Northwestern University (M.D.)
- Occupation: Psychoanalyst
- Title: Medical Director at Austen Riggs Center
- Term: 1947–1966
- Predecessor: Charles H. Kimberly
- Successor: Otto Allen Will Jr.
- Spouse: Adele Knight
- Children: 6

Robert Palmer Knight (July 18, 1902 – April 30, 1966) was an American psychoanalyst. He served as the medical director of the Austen Riggs Center from 1947 until his death in 1966.

== Early life ==
Knight was born on July 18, 1902, in Urbana, Ohio to William James Knight and Florence Dempcy Knight. He graduated from Oberlin College. He earned his medical degree from Northwestern University.

== Career ==
Knight served his psychiatric residency at the Menninger Clinic. He later became the clinic's chief of staff, and continued to work there until 1947, when he was appointed as medical director of the Austen Riggs Center. During his time there, he dedicated much of his attention to borderline personality disorder. He remained medical director there until his death in 1966.

He served as president of the American Psychoanalytic Association from 1945 to 1946.

== Death ==
Knight died of lung cancer on April 30, 1966, in Stockbridge, Massachusetts. At the time of his death, he was married to Adele Baroudi Knight, with whom he had two daughters and a son. He also had three sons from a previous marriage. He was buried in Stockbridge Cemetery.
