= Renate Stendhal =

German interpersonal counselor, writing coach, and author

- Born: 29 January 1944 (age 82); Stendal, Germany
- Occupations: writer, writing coach, provost
- Writing career
- Genres: Fiction, non-fiction
- Subjects: Feminism, women, eroticism, children's literature
- Website: www.renatestendhal.com

Renate Stendhal, born Renate Neumann on January 29, 1944, in Stendal, Germany, is a bilingual writer and existential counselor. She has published books of fiction and nonfiction with a focus on the erotic and creative empowerment of women. Three of her books were co-authored with writer Kim Chernin (1940–2020), her life-companion of 35 years.

== European years ==
During her school years in Berlin and Hamburg, Renate Stendhal pursued studies of liberal arts and dancing. From 1963, she studied literature at Hamburg University, but left in 1966, shortly before her MA, to study ballet in Munich and Paris. After an engagement as a dancer at the Deutsche Oper Berlin, she returned to Paris in 1970 and joined the experimental theater group, Coltra, with her partner, Sun Guérin. The group premiered the first feminist theater play performed in Paris, Mod Donna by Myrna Lamb, at the 1972 Biennale Internationale des Jeunes Artistes. While playing the role of a Broadway dancer in the Paris premiere of Louis-Ferdinand Céline's play The Church in 1973, she met German cultural journalist Ruth Henry who encouraged her to write about dance and theater. At this time, she adopted her theater name, Renate Stendhal, as her pen name and ultimately, official name. In Henry's Paris salon she met surrealist artist Meret Oppenheim and became her personal assistant until 1980. During the same time she started writing, Stendhal became a cultural correspondent for German radio and press (Frankfurter Rundschau, Deusche Welle. et al.) and worked as a translator.

== Feminist contributions ==
With the beginning of the French and German feminist movements, Renate Stendhal became an activist. She found role models for women's intellectual and sexual empowerment in members of the French MLF (Mouvement de Libération des Fennes) who were writers: Christiane Rochefort and Monique Wittig. Stendhal later evoked the defining influence of French culture and the erotic euphoria of those feminist years in Paris in a memoir. In the 70s, she also joined English-speaking women's groups and workshops (poetry, Super-8 Film with Katerina Tomadakis) in Paris. Together with her Danish partner, painter Maj Skadegaard, she created the first feminist multimedia show in Europe, “In the Beginning . . . of the End: A Voyage of Women Becoming” (1980). The show premiered at the Berlin Summer University and, a year later, was recorded on film by Studio D of the National Film Board of Canada. In the Beginning…of the End was featured at women's festivals (Berlin, Paris-Crétail, Hartford, Amsterdam, Vienna, et al.) and international film festivals (Sarlat, New York). While touring across Europe from 1980 to 1983, the couple gave multimedia workshops and Stendhal lectured on women's creative and erotic empowerment. Her essays and articles appeared in major feminist magazines including Feministische Studien, EMMA, Sinister Wisdom, WomanSpirit, and Trivia: Voices of Feminism.

== Between Europe and the States ==
During the 1980s, she became the first German translator of feminist authors Susan Griffin, Audre Lord, Adrienne Rich, and others. In 1984, she accompanied Audre Lorde as a translator on a reading tour of Germany and Switzerland. She translated Gertrude Stein's only mystery novel, Blood on the Dining-Room Floor, into German and created a photo-biography with parallel visual and textual readings of Stein's life, first in German, in 1989, then in English: Gertrude Stein: In Words and Pictures, in 1994. The intent was to make the American language revolutionary by gathering her best one-liners ("there is no there there") and funniest anecdotes paired with photographic illustrations. The English edition (Algonquin Books, 1994) earned a Lambda Award.

In 1986, when German women took over the Frankfurt opera house to celebrate Judy Chicago's Dinner Party with a “Fest der 1000 Frauen,” with each woman costumed as one of the 999 women memorialized in the art installation, Stendhal translated for the guest of honor, Judy Chicago. The event was linked to the Women’s Memorial Labyrinth Movement. In a ceremony in Wiesbaden, 2006, to commemorate the 25-year anniversary of the labyrinth, Stendhal set a memorial stone for Gertrude Stein.

== American years ==
In 1982, a chance meeting at her Paris writing café, Le Rostand, led to a friendship with author Kim Chernin, who became her life companion three and a half years later, when they met again in Paris. After joining Chernin in Berkeley, CA, in 1986, the couple published the first of three coauthored books, Sex and Other Sacred Games, a lesbian version of the Platonic dialogue on love and eros, in 1989. Both were lovers of classical music and opera, and when they heard an unknown singer at Hertz Hall, in Berkeley, in 1991, they saw the performance as the debut of a world star. They followed the evolution and fame of the young mezzo-soprano, researched her performances at European opera archives, and published a portrait, Cecilia Bartoli: A Passion of Song, in 1997. While Chernin described the singer's voice and concert performances, Stendhal analyzed the first ten years of her operatic roles.

In 2012, the photo-biography of Gertrude Stein was republished and Stendhal was invited to speak at the epochal exhibitions, "The Steins Collect: Matisse, Picasso and the Parisian Avant-Garde", at SFMOMA, and the parallel exhibition "Seeing Gertrude Stein: Five Stories", at the Contemporary Jewish Museum of San Francisco. Stendhal was also actively engaged in the controversies over Stein's politics during the German Occupation. With lectures and articles she defended Stein from the accusation of collaborating with the Vichy Regime. She followed the “Summer of Stein” in her blog, quotinggertrudestein: Why Do Something If It Can Be Done.

By that time, Stendhal and Chernin had moved to the nature preserve Pt. Reyes Station, an hour north of San Francisco. The couple worked as editors, writing consultants, and counselors. Stendhal volunteered for several years for the Pt. Reyes community, giving writing workshops to local seniors.

== Psychology ==
In 1988, Stendhal and Chernin enlisted at New College of California in San Francisco for an MA in clinical psychology, and started training as therapists. After three years of internships and passing the written licensing exam, they opted out of the conventional therapy system, choosing a more spiritual path. They obtained a Ph.D. in Spiritual Psychology at UIL (the University of Integrative Learning), in 1994, and got ordained as ministers by AIWP, the Association for the Integration of the Whole Person. Stendhal served for several years as a provost for UIL, guiding students through MA and Ph.D. programs in spiritual psychology that rewarded lifelong learning.

In her practice as an interpersonal, existential counselor, Stendhal consulted with psychoanalysts Otto Will and Beulah Parker. She worked with individuals and couples, pursuing her reflections on women and eros with a guidebook for couples: True Secrets of Lesbian Desire: Keeping Sex Alive in Long-Term Relationships (North Atlantic Books, 2003), originally published as Love's Learning Place: Truth as Aphrodisiac in Women's Long-Term Relationships (EdgeWork Books, 2002). Similar ideas of fulfillment in women's relationships inspired Stendhal and Chernin to publish a “tool kit” for couples in their third collaboration, Lesbian Marriage: A Love & Sex Forever Kit. The book came out in 2014, in time to celebrate their wedding after almost thirty years together.

Almost three decades after leaving Europe for the States, Stendhal published Kiss Me Again, Paris, a memoir she coined a “memoir à clef”. The memoir is intended as a love declaration to the City of Light and a self-ironic portrait of the excess of sexual liberation, the romance of a bohemian life-style, and the creative chaos of the French women's movement.

== Other works ==
Renate Stendhal's work, articles, and essays have appeared internationally in anthologies and diverse media; in the United States in Lambda Literary Online, The Huffington Post, The Los Angeles Times, The San Francisco Chronicle, Ms. Magazine, The Advocate, Chicago Quarterly Review, Tikkun Magazine, Four Seasons Magazine, Epochalips, The Daily Beast, Travel Magazine, Centre Pompidou, Emma Magazine, and many others. In 2000, Kim Chernin and she founded a women's publishing collective, EdgeWork Books. She co-authored The Extraordinary Life of An Ordinary Man, with Al Hirshen (2019).

== Books ==
- Gertrude Stein: Ein Leben in Bildern und Texten (1989) ISBN 978-0-9455-7599-3
- Sex and Other Sacred Games (with Kim Chernin; 1989) ISBN 978-0-8129-1676-8
- Gertrude Stein: In Words and Pictures (1989) ISBN 0945575998
- Cecilia Bartoli: The Passion of Song (with Kim Chernin; 1997) ISBN 0060186445
  - (Cecilia Bartoli: Eine Liebeserklärung (1999) ISBN 0060186445)
- The Grasshopper's Secret: A Magical Tale (2002) ISBN 978-1-9312-2305-8
- True Secrets of Lesbian Desire: Keeping Sex Alive in Long-Term Relationships (2003) ISBN 978-1-5564-3475-4
  - (Die Farben der Lust - Sex in lesbischen Liebesbeziehungen (2004) ISBN 978-3-9300-4175-6)
- Lesbian Marriage: A Love & Sex Forever Kit (with Kim Chernin; 2014) ISBN 978-0-6159-9236-5
- Kiss Me Again, Paris: A Memoir (2017) ISBN 978-0-9859-7738-2

== Translations ==
- Gertrude Stein, Blood on the Dining-Room Floor—keine keiner: ein Kriminalroman, Arche Verlag, Zürich 1985 ISBN 978-3-7160-2021-0
- Essays and poems by Audre Lorde and Adrienne Rich—Macht und Sinnlichkeit: Ausgewählte Texte von Adrienne Rich und Audre Lodere, sub rosa Frauenverlag, Berlin 1983 ISBN 978-3-922166-13-9
- Audre Lorde, Cancer Diaries—Auf Leben und Tod: Krebstagebuch, sub rosa Frauenverlag, Berlin 1984 ISBN 978-3-929823-09-7
- Susan Griffin, Woman and Nature: The Roaring Inside Her—Frau und Natur, Suhrkamp, Frankfurt 1978 ISBN 3518069296
- Selma Stockenström, The Expedition to the Baobab Tree (1981), translated from the Afrikaans by J.M. Coetzee (1983)— Denn der siebte Sinn ist der Schlaf, Arche Verlag, Zürich 1987. Republished as Der siebte Sinn ist der Schaf, Verlag Klaus Wagenbach, Berlin 2020. ISBN 978-3-8031-3322-9

== Awards and honors ==
- Winner of 1995 Lambda Literary Award for Lesbian Biography Gertrude Stein: In Words and Pictures
- Winner of a 2016 WNBA Award, juried by Deirdre Bair, for an excerpt from her unpublished memoir Kiss Me Again, Paris: A Memoir
- Winner of 2018 International Book Awards in LGBTQ Non-Fiction for her memoir Kiss Me Again, Paris: A Memoir
- Nominated for 2018 Lambda Literary Award in Lesbian Non-Fiction/Memoir for Kiss Me Again, Paris: A Memoir
- Finalist for 2018 Best Book Awards in LGBTQ Non-fiction for Kiss Me Again, Paris: A Memoir
