= Eric Plakun =

American researcher and forensic psychiatrist

Eric M. Plakun
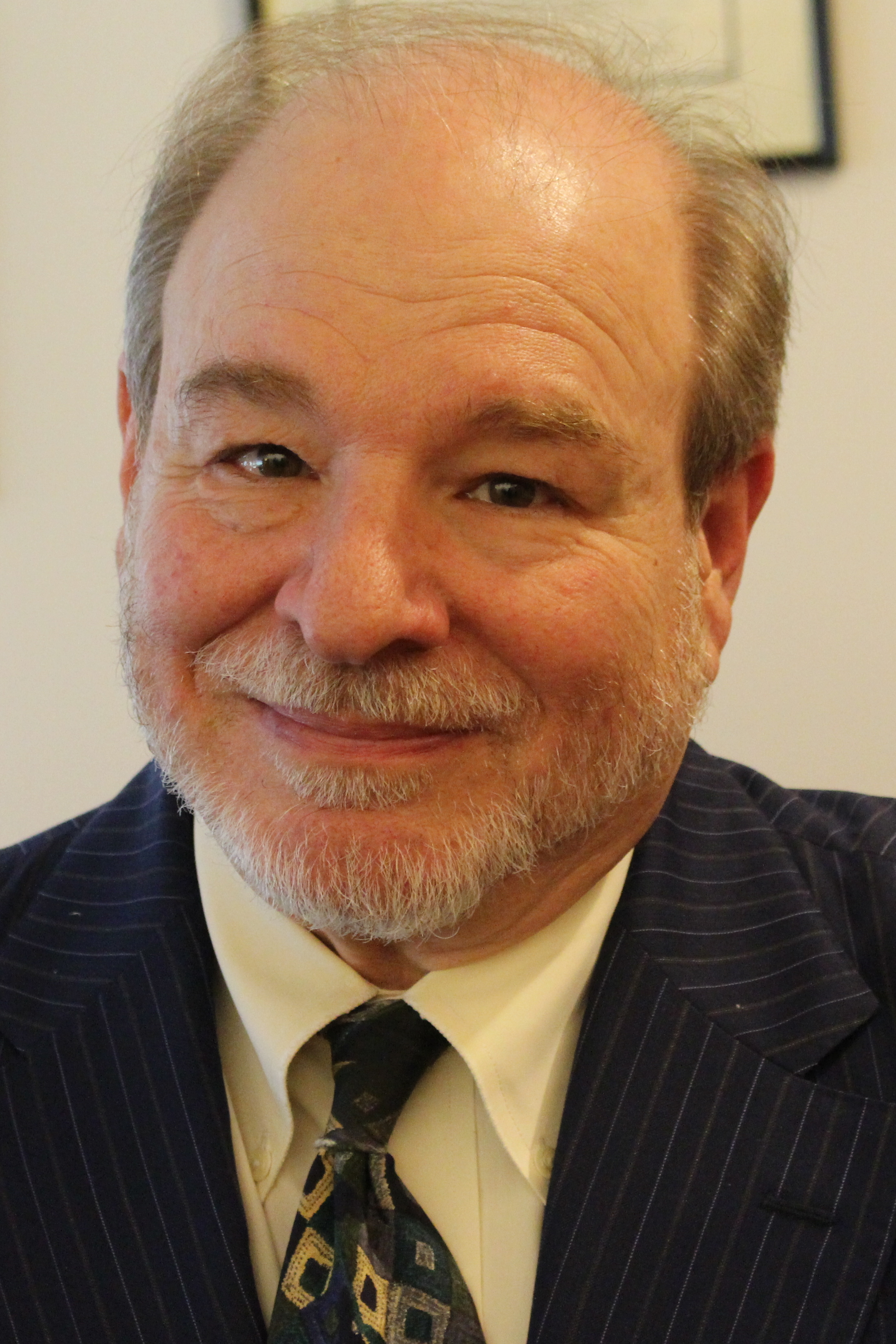
- Education: Hofstra University (BA); Columbia University College of Physicians and Surgeons (MD); Dartmouth-Hitchcock Medical Center (psychiatric residency)
- Scientific career
- Fields: Psychoanalysis, psychiatry
- Workplaces: Austen Riggs Center

Eric M. Plakun is an American psychiatrist, psychoanalyst, researcher and forensic psychiatrist. He is the current medical director/CEO at the Austen Riggs Center in Stockbridge, Massachusetts. Plakun's primary interests include the mental health advocacy, full implementation of the mental health parity law, access-to-care issues, and reducing health disparities; the value of and evidence base for psychosocial treatments and the diagnosis, treatment, longitudinal course and outcome of patients with borderline personality disorder and treatment resistant disorders.

Plakun has been widely published and quoted in the media on psychotherapy and psychiatry, including in The New York Times and The Globe and Mail. He has appeared in the media to discuss his psychiatric work on WAMC, the Albany, New York, affiliate of NPR. and on CBS 60 Minutes. His psychiatric research has been widely cited.

== Career ==
Plakun attended Hofstra University and received an M.D. from the Columbia University College of Physicians and Surgeons in 1972. After an internship in medicine at Dartmouth-Hitchcock Medical Center, Plakun worked as a rural primary care practitioner in Vermont before completing a psychiatric residency also at Dartmouth-Hitchcock Medical Center and a Fellowship and Advanced Fellowship in Psychoanalytic Studies at the Austen Riggs Center. He is a Distinguished Life Fellow of the American Psychiatric Association, and serves on the APA Board of Trustees representing New England and Eastern Canada. He is a former member of the APA Assembly, where he served as chair of the Assembly Committee of Representatives of Subspecialties and Sections and on the Assembly Executive Committee. In the APA he has also been past chair of the Committee on Psychotherapy by Psychiatrists, and the founding leader of the APA Psychotherapy Caucus. Plakun is a Fellow of the American College of Psychiatrists and a Fellow of the American College of Psychoanalysts. He is a Psychoanalytic Fellow and former Trustee of the American Academy of Psychoanalysis and Dynamic Psychiatry. He is an associate editor of the journal Psychodynamic Psychiatry. Plakun also served for more than a decade with the American Board of Psychiatry and Neurology as a member of the written test committee and as an oral examiner. In 2003, Plakun was selected by the 1700 member Massachusetts Psychiatric Society as the "Outstanding Psychiatrist in Clinical Psychiatry." In addition, Plakun is a member of the Group for the Advancement of Psychiatry (GAP) Committee on Psychotherapy and the American College of Psychoanalysts Board of Regents.

== APA Psychotherapy Caucus ==
Plakun led the effort that culminated in the founding of the American Psychiatric Association Psychotherapy Caucus, established in 2014. The purpose of the caucus is to connect APA members who share an interest in psychotherapy and psychosocial treatments as well as to "raise the profile of psychotherapy and psychosocial treatment in psychiatry, and to secure skills in these areas as part of the training and identity of future psychiatrists so the field and its practitioners are practicing within a genuinely biopsychosocial model." The caucus is engaged in a number of advocacy and educational activities and currently has close to 300 members.

== Research and writing ==
Plakun is the editor of New Perspectives on Narcissism (American Psychiatric Press, 1990) and Treatment Resistance and Patient Authority: The Austen Riggs Reader (W.W. Norton & Company, 2011) and author of nearly 100 articles and book chapters on the diagnosis, treatment, longitudinal course and outcome of patients with borderline personality disorder, treatment resistant disorders, and on shared elements of various schools of psychotherapy. An advocate for the value of psychotherapy and psychosocial treatment, Plakun has argued for the full implementation of the Mental Health Parity and Addictions Equity Act, served as Plaintiffs’ expert on adult mental disorders in Wit v. United Behavioral Health federal class-action, and has presented and written about the case. He has also researched and written on what he calls "Psychiatry’s False Assumptions": [1] genes = disease; [2] patients present with single disorders that respond to specific evidence-based treatments; and [3] the best treatments are pills. Separately, he has written about psychodynamic residential treatment for patients who have encountered an impasse in their treatment and has called for an evidence-based, inclusive reconceptualization of how psychotherapy competencies are presented and taught to residents.

== Selected publications ==
- Plakun, Eric M.; Burkhardt, Paul E.; Muller, John P. (September 1985). "14-year follow-up of borderline and schizotypal personality disorders". Comprehensive Psychiatry. 26 (5): 448–455. doi:10.1016/0010-440X(85)90081-1. PMID 4028695.
- Plakun, Eric M. (September 1989). "Narcissistic Personality Disorder: A Validity Study and Comparison to Borderline Personality Disorder". Psychiatric Clinics of North America. 12 (3): 603–620. doi:10.1016/S0193-953X(18)30417-9.
- Plakun, E. M. (February 1996). "Treatment of personality disorders in an era of limited resources". Psychiatric Services. 47 (2): 128–130. doi:10.1176/ps.47.2.128. PMID 8825245.
- Plakun, Eric M (2001). "Making the alliance and taking the transference in work with suicidal patients". The Journal of Psychotherapy Practice and Research. 10 (4): 269–276. PMC 3330670. PMID 11696654.
- Plakun, EM (1994). "Principles in the psychotherapy of self-destructive borderline patients". The Journal of Psychotherapy Practice and Research. 3 (2): 138–48. PMC 3330365. PMID 22700187.
- Plakun, Eric M. (January 2006). "Finding Psychodynamic Psychiatry's Lost Generation". The Journal of the American Academy of Psychoanalysis and Dynamic Psychiatry. 34 (1): 135–150. doi:10.1521/jaap.2006.34.1.135. PMID 16548752. ProQuest 198147134. Cited in 29 publications.
- Plakun, Eric M. (June 1991). "Prediction of Outcome in Borderline Personality Disorder". Journal of Personality Disorders. 5 (2): 93–101. doi:10.1521/pedi.1991.5.2.93. ProQuest 848889730. Cited in 41 publications.
- Plakun, Eric M.; Sudak, Donna M.; Goldberg, David (January 2009). "The Y Model: An Integrated, Evidence-Based Approach to Teaching Psychotherapy Competencies". Journal of Psychiatric Practice. 15 (1): 5–11. doi:10.1097/01.pra.0000344914.54082.eb. PMID 19182560. S2CID 2520530.
- Sledge, William; Plakun, Eric M; Bauer, Stephen; Brodsky, Beth; Caligor, Eve; Clemens, Norman A; Deen, Serina; Kay, Jerald; Lazar, Susan; Mellman, Lisa A; Myers, Michael; Oldham, John; Yeomans, Frank (2014). "Psychotherapy for suicidal patients with borderline personality disorder: an expert consensus review of common factors across five therapies". Borderline Personality Disorder and Emotion Dysregulation. 1 (1): 16. doi:10.1186/2051-6673-1-16. PMC 4579509. PMID 26401300.
- Eric M., Plakun (May 27, 2015). "Correcting Psychiatry's False Assumptions and Implementing Parity". Psychiatric Times. 32 (5).
