= David Rapaport =

Hungarian psychologist (1911–1960)

David A. Rapaport (September 30, 1911, Budapest, Austria-Hungary – December 14, 1960, Stockbridge, Mass.) was a Hungarian clinical psychologist and psychoanalytic ego psychologist.

== Biography ==
Rapaport was born in Budapest, Hungary on September 30, 1911. A precocious student, he received Bachelor of Science degrees in mathematics and experimental physics in 1935, and a Ph.D. in psychology and philosophy in 1938, all attained at the Royal Hungarian Petrus Pazmany University in Budapest. During this period he also obtained a Montessori teaching degree. Beginning when Rapaport was a teenager, he participated in a Zionist organization and helped Hungarian Jews escape to Palestine. From 1932-1934, Rapaport lived on a kibbutz in Palestine, where he met and married Elvira Strasser and where his first child, Hanna, was born (Gill, 1961; Knight, 1961).

In December 1938, Rapaport and his family emigrated to the United States, sponsored by the American Psychoanalytic Association’s Emergency Committee on Relief and Immigration. Initially, he worked as psychologist at Mount Sinai Hospital, and then took a similar position at the Osawatomie State Hospital in Kansas (Gill, 1961; Knight, 1961).

From 1940-1948, Rapaport was on the staff of the Menninger Clinic in Topeka, KS, eventually becoming the chief psychologist and research director. From 1948 until his death, Rapaport was a senior staff member of the Austen Riggs Center, in Stockbridge, Massachusetts. Rapaport died from a heart attack on December 14, 1960, at age forty-nine (Gill, 1961; Knight, 1961).

== Scholarly contributions ==
During Rapaport’s career, he became an acknowledged authority on both clinical psychology and psychoanalytic theory. In 1960, he was awarded a Citation for Distinguished Contributions to the Science and Profession of Clinical Psychology from the American Psychological Association. Furthermore, Rapaport was also proposed for honorary membership in the American Psychoanalytic Association. Upon meeting Anna Freud in Worcester, MA in 1950, Ms. Freud stated: “Dr. Rapaport, you know more metapsychology than any of us!” (Knight, 1961, p. 264).

=== Diagnostic testing ===
Rapaport’s first notable work was in diagnostic psychological testing. Rather than being a mere psychometrician, Rapaport regarded his work on diagnostic testing as carrying forward the efforts of Kraepelin and Bleuler to identify and describe pathological organizations of thought. Rapaport regarded thought organization as the key to personality dynamics.

Rapaport developed the now standard comprehensive testing battery, which included both cognitive and personality assessment methods. Rapaport also provided a framework for analyzing test results. Rapaport argued that every behavior and test response is derived from the individual’s personality, which offered a means of observing how his or her personality was organized.

=== Psychoanalytic theory ===
Rapaport played a prominent role in the development of psychoanalytic ego psychology and his work likely represented its apex (Wallerstein, 2002). In Rapaport's influential monograph The Structure of Psychoanalytic Theory (1960), he organized ego psychology into an integrated, systematic, and hierarchical theory capable of generating empirically testable hypotheses. According to Rapaport, psychoanalytic theory—as expressed through the principles of ego psychology—was a biologically based general psychology that could explain the entire range of human psychological functioning (e.g., memory, perception, motivation) and behavior (Rapaport, 1960). For Rapaport, this endeavor was fully consistent with Freud's attempts to do the same (e.g., Freud's studies of dreams, jokes, and the "psychopathology of everyday life".)

== Influence ==
Rapaport's approach to psychological testing revolutionized clinical psychology. His first manual was widely used by psychologists during World War II, and in its final form became the two-volume Diagnostic Psychological Testing (1945–46), which remained widely used by psychologists into the 1980s (Fritsch, 2013). Rapaport also brought psychoanalytic theory into the 20th century through his lectures and writing. His lecturing style “was extraordinary and to some intimidating, especially to those accustomed to gentility in scientific discourse. He discussed abstract metapsychology with the fervor of a political orator and the thunder of a Hebrew prophet.” (Gill, 1961, p. 757)

Rapaport exerted a major influence on a generation of clinical psychologists and psychoanalysts, notably Merton Gill, Roy Schafer, George S. Klein, and Robert R. Holt, in their exploration of such diverse topics as diagnostic testing, cognitive style, subliminal perception, altered states, and ego autonomy. And it was through his work that the Menninger Clinic became known for pioneering advances in clinical psychology and psychoanalysis.

Finally, Rapaport was a founder and first secretary (1946-1949) of the newly formed Division of Clinical and Abnormal Psychology of the American Psychological Association.

== Major works ==
- Rapaport, D. (1942). Freudian Mechanisms and Frustration Experiments. Psychoanal Q., 11:503-511.
- Rapaport, D., Gill, M., & Schafer, R. (1945). Diagnostic Psychological Testing, Volume I. Chicago, IL: The Year Book Publishers.
- Rapaport, D., Gill, M., & Schafer, R. (1946). Diagnostic Psychological Testing, Volume II. Chicago, IL: The Year Book Publishers.
- Rapaport, D. (1950). On the Psycho-Analytic Theory of Thinking. Int. J. Psycho-Anal., 31:161-170.
- Rapaport, D. (1950). Organization and Pathology of Thought. New York, NY: Columbia University Press.
- Rapaport, D. (1953). On the Psycho-Analytic Theory of Affects. Int. J. Psycho-Anal., 34:177-198.
- Rapaport, D., Gill, M.M. (1959). The Points of View and Assumptions of Metapsychology. Int. J. Psycho-Anal., 40:153-162.
- Rapaport, D. (1960). The structure of psychoanalytic theory: A systematic attempt. International Universities Press, Inc.
- Rapaport, D. (1967). The Collected Papers of David Rapaport [1942-1960] (Merton M. Gill, editor). New York: Basic Books.
