= Wayne Fenton =

American psychiatrist (1953–2006)

Wayne Fenton (March 24, 1953 – September 3, 2006) was an American psychiatrist, well known for his academic contributions to the study of schizophrenia including key contributions to the classification of subtypes.

In 2006, he was killed at his office in Bethesda, Maryland, by a 19-year-old patient.

== Professional career ==
Dr Fenton obtained his medical qualification from George Washington University School of Medicine in 1979 and psychiatric qualification from Yale and was a staff member at Chestnut Lodge for more than 15 years.

He worked for the National Institute of Mental Health as researcher and academic, writing a chapter on therapy for schizophrenia in a leading psychiatry textbook and had a significant impact on his clinical profession.
