= West Montgomery Avenue Historic District =

Historic district in Maryland, United States

- U.S. National Register of Historic Places
- U.S. Historic district
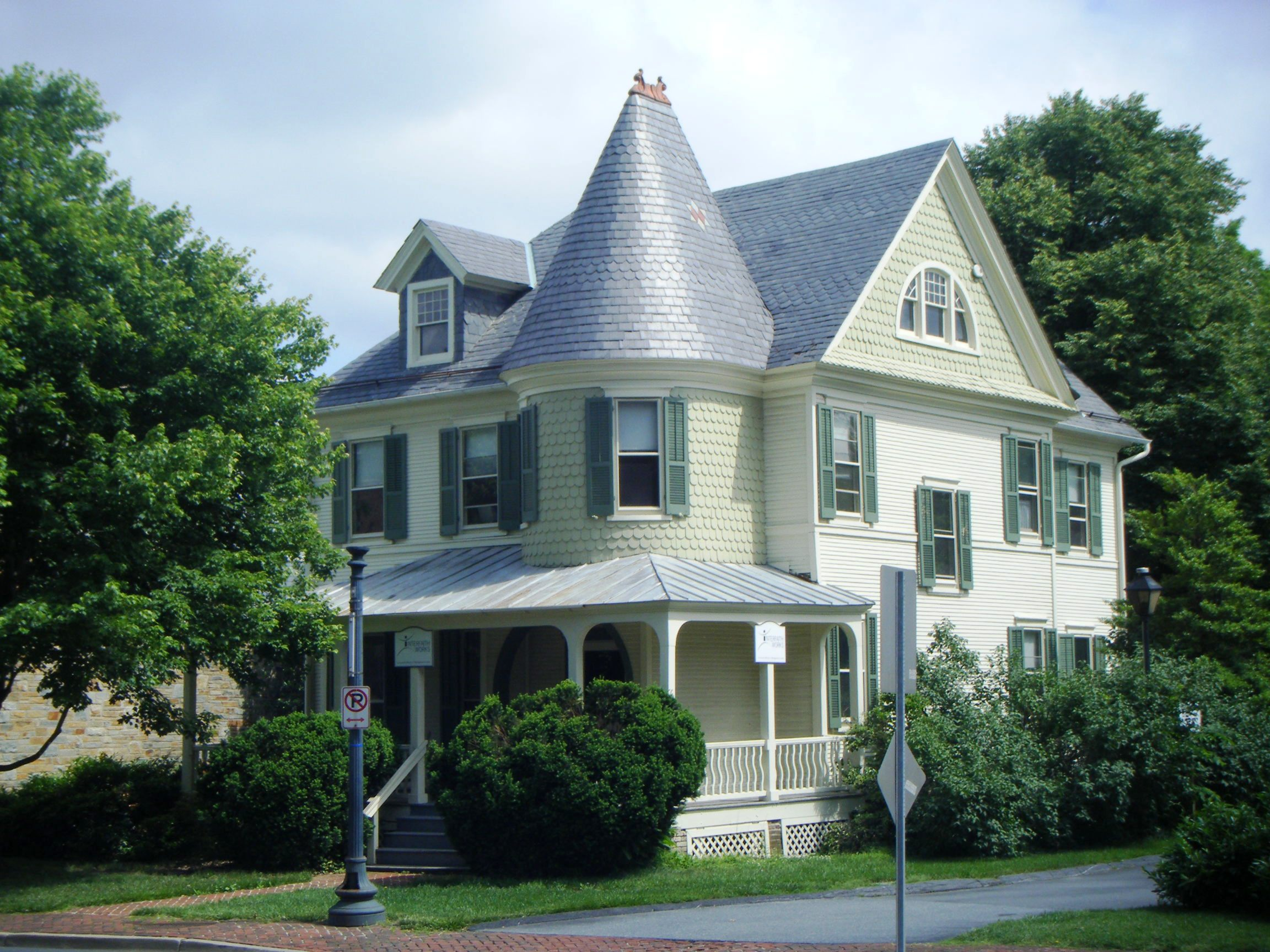
- Queen Anne style house on West Montgomery Avenue.

- Location within Maryland Location within the United States
- Location: Residential area centered around W. Montgomery Ave., Rockville, Maryland
- Coordinates: 39°5′2″N 77°9′41″W
- Area: 53 acres (21 ha)
- Built: 1790
- Architectural style: Late Victorian, Stick/eastlake, Federal
- NRHP reference No.: 75000915
- Added to NRHP: May 29, 1975

The West Montgomery Avenue Historic District is a national historic district located at Rockville, Montgomery County, Maryland. It is a residential area with single-family homes predominating. The majority of the properties within the district date from the 1880s, with a few older homes and somewhat more from later periods. The predominant character of the district is set by the rows of Victorian houses built between 1880 and 1900 in a vernacular residential mode with Eastlake and Stick Style influences. Also included in the district are attorneys' offices; churches and parsonages; a funeral home; the former Woodlawn Hotel, later called the Chestnut Lodge Sanitarium (destroyed by fire, June 7, 2009); and the headquarters of the Montgomery County Historical Society.

It was listed on the National Register of Historic Places in 1975.

== Gallery ==
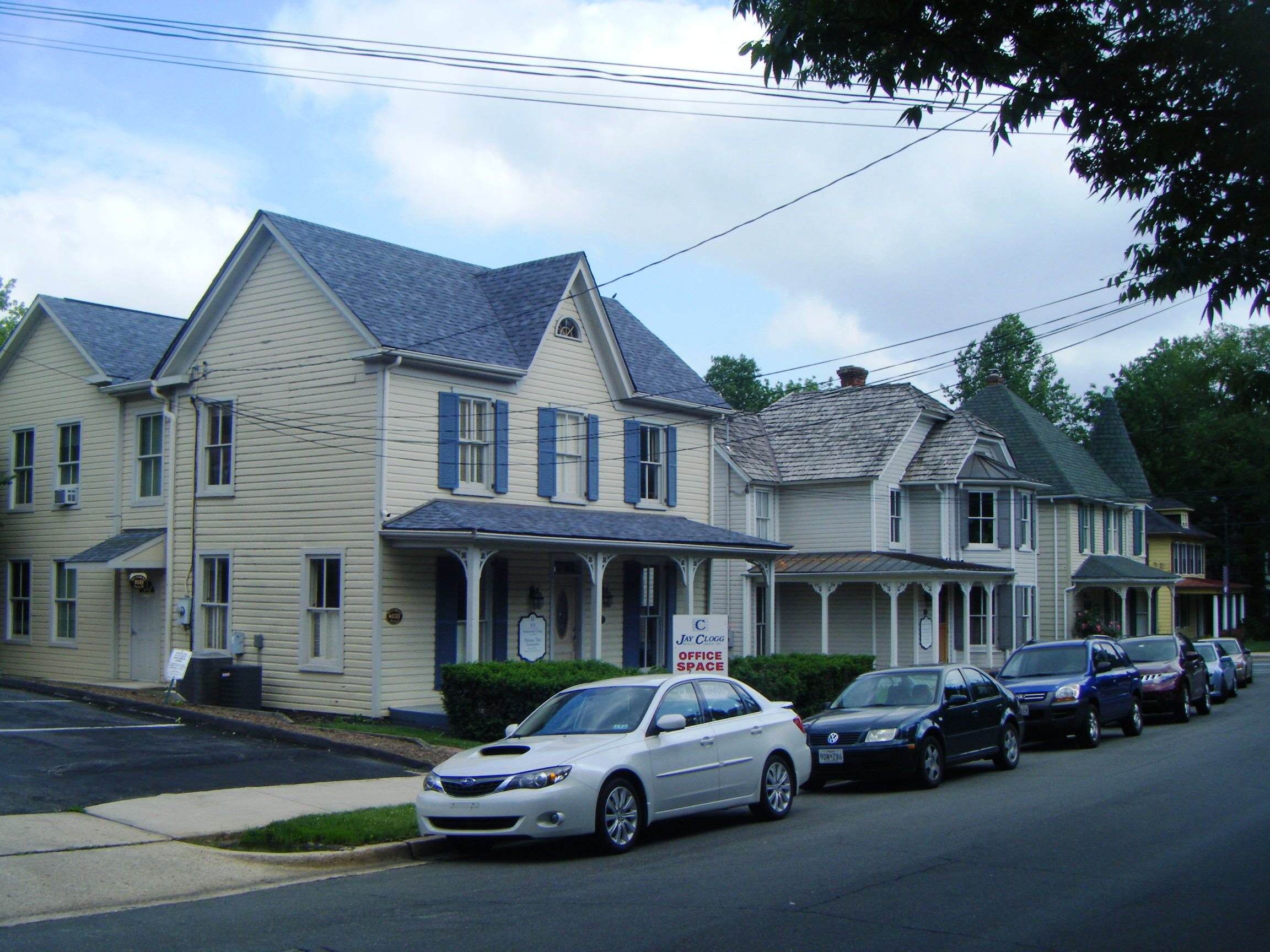
Homes and offices on South Adams Street

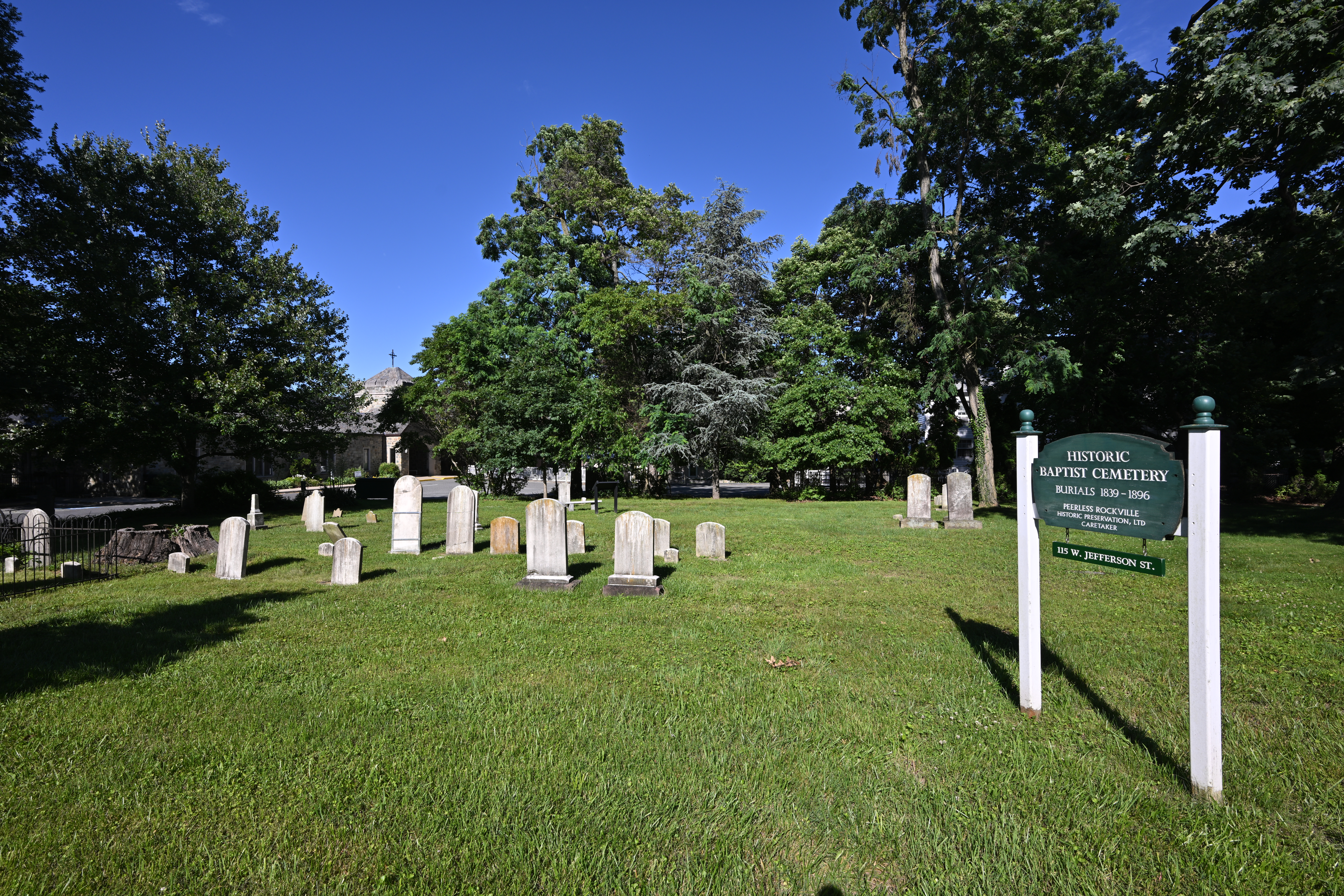
Baptist Cemetery, 115 West Jefferson St

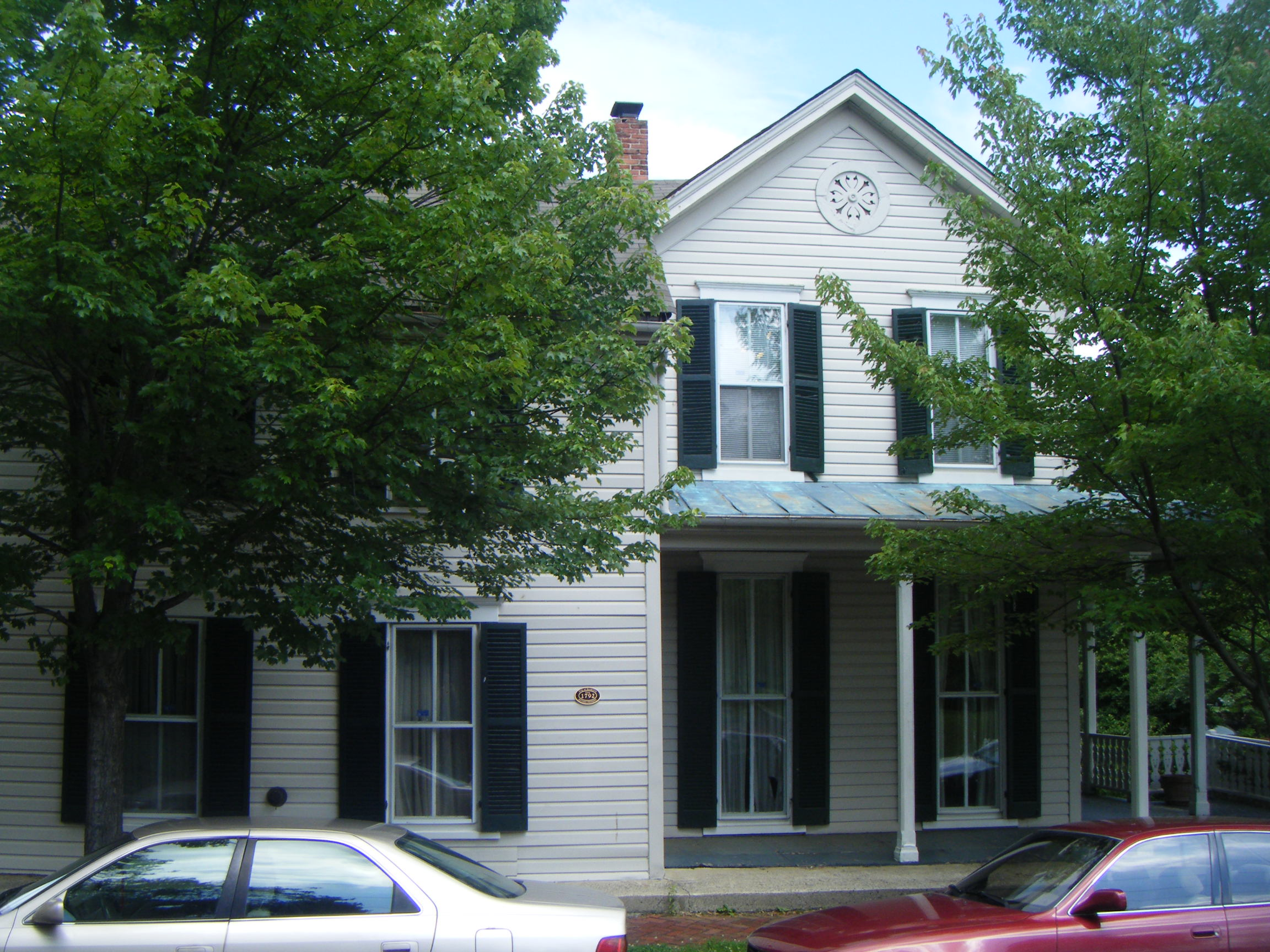
The Jenkins Miller McFarland House on 5 North Adams Street. Reportedly the oldest surviving structure in Rockville, it was built in 1793
