= Austen Fox Riggs =

American psychiatrist

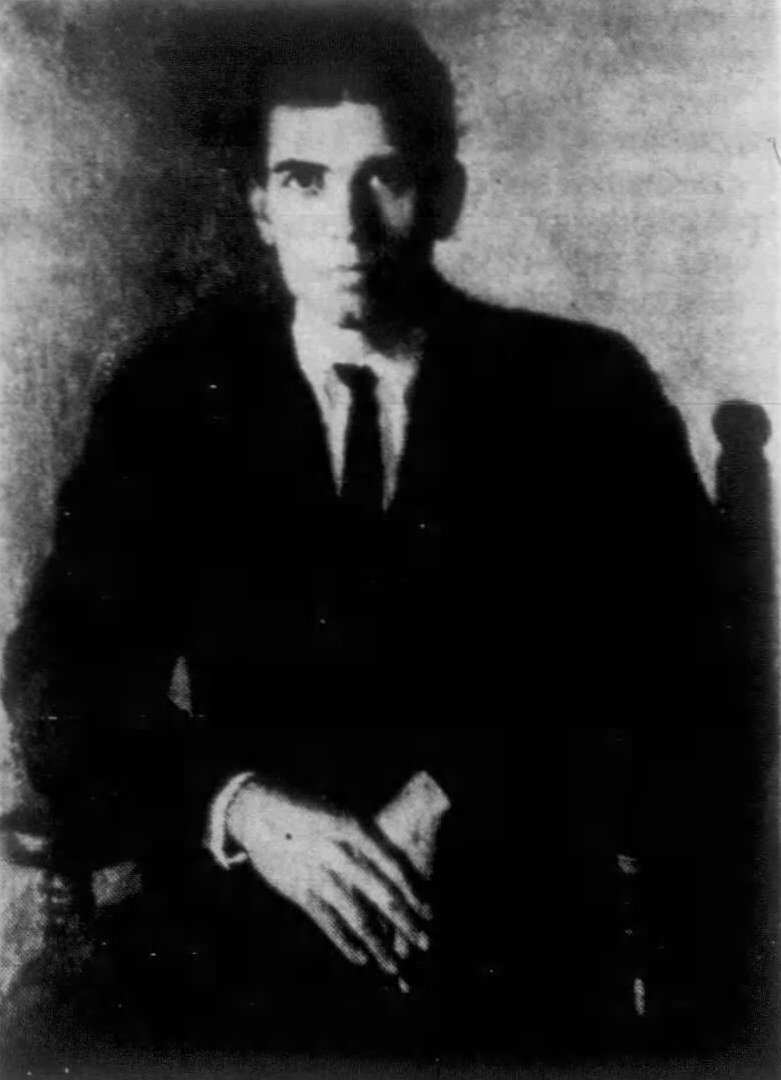
- Portrait of Riggs made in 1913
- Born: December 12, 1876; Kassel, Germany
- Died: March 5, 1940 (aged 63); Stockbridge, Massachusetts
- Citizenship: United States
- Education: Harvard University (BA); Columbia University (MD)
- Occupation: Psychoanalyst
- Organization: Austen Riggs Center
- Title: Medical Director
- Term: 1913–1940
- Predecessor: position established
- Successor: Charles H. Kimberly
- Spouse: Alice McBurney Riggs
- Children: 4

Austen Fox Riggs (December 12, 1876 – March 5, 1940) was an American psychiatrist and pioneering researcher in stress response. In 1913, he founded the Austen Riggs Center, a psychiatric treatment facility in Stockbridge, Massachusetts.

== Biography ==
Austen Fox Riggs was born on December 12, 1876, in Kassel, Germany, to American parents, Benjamin C. Riggs and Rebecca (Fox) Riggs. He attended Harvard University and received his Bachelor of Arts degree in 1898. He then attended the Columbia University College of Physicians and Surgeons to receive his M.D. in 1902. He completed further post-graduate work at Johns Hopkins School of Medicine in 1904.

In 1907, Riggs was recovering from tuberculosis at his Stockbridge, Massachusetts home when he began furthering his understanding of psychiatry and psychology. In 1913, he established the Stockbridge Institute for the Study and Treatment of Psychoneuroses, a mental health facility for voluntary admittance patients. In 1919, it was renamed to the Austen Riggs Foundation, and today is known as the Austen Riggs Center.

In 1927, Riggs was awarded an honorary Doctor of Science degree by Williams College.

Riggs served as its president and medical director at the Austen Riggs Ceneter until his death in 1940 due to illness.

== Publications ==
- Talks to patients, I–III (1916)
- Just Nerves (1922) – with introduction by Henry Van Dyke
- Intelligent Living (1929)
- Play: Recreation in a Balanced Life (1935)

== Personal life ==
In April 1904, Riggs married Alice McBurney Riggs, and they had three daughters and a son together. She died in 1970.
