= Kim Chernin =

American writer (1940–2020)

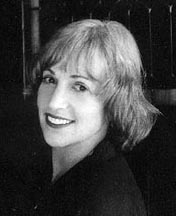
- Kim Chernin
- Born: May 7, 1940; Bronx, New York, U.S.
- Died: December 17, 2020 (aged 80); Point Reyes Station, San Francisco, California, U.S.
- Occupations: Writer; poet; writing and spiritual consultant; pastoral counselor
- Writing career
- Genres: Fiction, non-fiction, poetry
- Subjects: Feminism, Judaism, mysticism, psychoanalysis, spirituality, eating disorders, food
- Website: www.kimchernin.com

Kim Chernin (May 7, 1940 – December 17, 2020) was a writer, editor and spiritual counselor, published numerous works of fiction, nonfiction, and poetry centered on women's search for self. In the early eighties, The Obsession and the national bestseller The Hungry Self were among the first popular books addressing women's eating disorders. She is best known for her memoir, In My Mother's House: A Daughter's Story, which was one of the first books on mother-daughter relationships. Her memoir was nominated for a Chronicle Critics Award and chosen as Alice Walker’s Favorite Book of the Year in the New York Times, 1983. Her first novel, The Flame Bearers was a New York Times Notable Book.

She appeared on Phil Donahue, Good Morning America, Charlie Rose, The Today Show and others, and was featured on radio stations across the U.S., including NPR, KQED Forum and Larry King Radio. She appeared in the documentaries If Women Ruled the World: A Washington Dinner Party and Goddess Remembered.

== Biography ==
Born as Elaine Kusnitz in the Bronx, New York, she was the second daughter of Russian-born Jewish immigrants. Both parents were active Marxists. Her mother, Rose Chernin Kusnitz (1901-1995), was a Communist party leader and labor organizer. Her father, Paul Kusnitz (1900-1967), was the first Jewish graduate from MIT and, in the thirties, briefly returned to Russia to work as an engineer on the Moscow subway. This led her to grow up as a communist.

When Kim was five, her sixteen-year-old sister Nina, her main caretaker, died of Hodgkin’s Lymphoma. The traumatic death, which was kept a secret from her, had a lasting impact on Chernin’s personal and writing life. Two books about this trauma, Kaddish for My Sister and My Sister and the Kabbalist remained unpublished. After Nina’s death, the family relocated to Los Angeles where Rose Chernin founded the Los Angeles Committee for the Protection of the Foreign Born. When Chernin was eleven, Rose was arrested and served a seven-month prison term for attempting to overthrow the government. The U.S. government tried unsuccessfully to deport her back to Russia.

As a “red-diaper baby,” Chernin was a member of the YCL, the Young Communist League. After her graduation from Susan Dorsey Miller High School in 1957, she was invited to Moscow for the World Festival of Youth and Students (1957) and went from there to China. At her return she began to detach herself from her parents’ political beliefs, seeing herself as a poet and mystic. In 1968, she enlisted as a freshman at UC Berkeley in English. The same year, Chernin married philosophy student, David Netboy and the couple went to Europe, where they spent five years. She attended lectures at Oxford, and studied English at Trinity College, Dublin. Chernin's only child, Larissa, was born in 1963, in Dublin. After their return, in 1964, the couple divorced and Kim picked up her studies at UC Berkeley. She graduated in 1965 with a BA in English literature.

== Jewish identity ==
After her divorce, she officially adopted the name Kim Chernin. She started writing seriously. Chernin's identity as a Jewish woman and mystic was reflected in her first published poems which appeared in Voices Within the Ark: The Modern Jewish Poets and her 1983 poetry collection The Hunger Song. Her first novel, The Flame Bearers (1983) was the story of a Jewish women’s mystical sect in Israel.

In 1969, Chernin went to Israel to find a permanent home for herself and her daughter. She joined Kibbutz Adamitat at the Lebanon border, but her stay was cut short after eight months when her attraction to a married woman caused a scandal. She suffered a breakdown, a crisis she described in her Israel memoir Crossing the Border (1994). Back in the States, she entered psychoanalysis to wrestle with her identity, bisexuality, and childhood trauma.

Her Russian-Jewish lineage was evoked in her multi-generational memoir, In My Mother’s House (1983), telling her mother’s story in Rose’s Yiddish-inflected voice. In 1987, she was invited to speak at the Women’s Studies/Jewish Studies Convergences Conference at Stanford University. It was the first time she addressed a Jewish audience and the experience strongly confirmed her Jewish identity. Her lecture was published by Tikkun Magazine and she went on to contribute frequent articles to the magazine. In 2004, she was honored by the Jewish Women’s Archive for her “activism on behalf of the Jewish Community,” in San Francisco. Her deep ongoing concern about the Israel/Palestine conflict led her to publish Seven Pillars of Jewish Denial (2004) and Everywhere a Guest, Nowhere at Home (2009).

== Feminist contributions ==
Chernin’s approach to women’s affliction with eating disorders was rooted in a feminist analysis of women’s restrictions within patriarchal traditions. She was among the first to write about women’s spiritual and creative hungers leading to anorexia and bulimia. The Obsession (1981) and The Hungry Self (1983) reached a large audience of women and are still in print. The third book of the trilogy, Reinventing Eve: Modern Woman in Search of Herself (1987) talked about women’s creativity through the sense of a feminist reinterpretation of the Garden of Eden.

With In My Mother’s House: A Daughter’s Story (1983) she was also among the first writers in the States to address the complexities of mother-daughter relationships. She picked up this theme again in 1989 with The Woman Who Gave Birth to Her Mother: Tales of Transformation in Women’s Lives.

Chernin came out as a lesbian in 1978, after attending the Santa Cruz Women’s Conference “The Great Goddess Reemerging.” The same year, she divorced her second husband, Robert Cantor, whom she had married in 1972. She began a relationship with feminist author Susan Griffin who encouraged her to publish her writing and start working as an editor, which she did for the next forty years. She reflected on falling for women in her memoir, My Life as a Boy (1997). In 1982, she met German writer and journalist Renate Stendhal in Paris, shortly before her relationship with Griffin ended. They exchanged letters and manuscripts and met again in Paris, in 1985. Chernin’s story “An American in Paris” described their falling in love. The couple lived together for 35 years in Berkeley and Pt. Reyes Station, CA. They co-authored Sex and Other Sacred Games (1987), Cecilia Bartoli: A Passion of Song (1999), and marked their marriage in 2014 with the publication of Lesbian Marriage: A Love & Sex Survival Kit.

In 2000, Chernin launched a small women’s publishing company, EdgeWork Books, together with Stendhal. They invited a collective of local writers and initiated monthly salons at the Montclair Women’s Culture Club. The EdgeWork collective published her second novel, The Girl Who Went and Saw and Came Back (2002), a story about childhood trauma and sexual abuse.

== Counseling ==
In response to numerous letters from readers asking advice for their struggles with food and body image, Chernin became a counselor, initially based on her own experience with eating disorders and her extensive psychoanalysis. She went back to school for an MA in clinical psychology and a PhD in spiritual psychology. She consulted with renowned psychiatrist and analyst Otto Will and contributed an introduction to his biography. She guest-taught a class at the San Francisco Analytic Institute with faculty member Elizabeth Lloyd Mayer in 2003. Her book A Different Kind of Listening: My Psychoanalysis and its Shadow (1996) discusses her years of psychoanalysis with renowned San Francisco analysts. She used case stories from her own practice in The Woman Who Gave Birth to her Mother (1998). In her later years she trained for Bay Area Hospice work while her private counseling work continued to the end of her life.

== Writing ==
Kim Chernin's work spans a number of different genres: memoir, fiction, creative non-fiction, poetry, and psychological study, centered around women's search for self. She received a National Endowment for the Arts for Fiction in 1990.

Her collaboration with Renate Stendhal started with mutual editing of manuscripts, which they continued throughout their life together. For their co-authored books, they adopted a dialogue form in Sex and Other Sacred Games (1989): Plato’s dialogue on eros is given to two women. In Cecilia Bartoli: The Passion for Song (1999) the form is a split narrative: Chernin describes the diva’s voice while Stendhal analyzes the opera performances of Bartoli’s early career. In Lesbian Marriage: A Love & Sex Forever Kit (2014) they merged their voices and writing styles.

In 2005, when Chernin and Stendhal moved from Berkeley to the countryside north of San Francisco, Chernin stopped publishing but continued to write. The new era of e-publishing, social media and marketing pressures alienated her. Her e-books, My First Year in the Country and Lesbian Marriage, both in the fall of 2014, were her last publications.

In her later years, she contributed poems to the magazine Dark Matter: Women Witnessing. Her numerous unpublished poems are archived at the Schlesinger Library.

Her articles and essays have appeared in The New York Times Magazine, San Francisco Focus, Tikkun, Washington Post, Scene4 Magazine, Trivia: A Journal of Ideas, Dark Matter, and others.

In 2017, she suffered her first-ever writing block, but a year later, started a diary about “having nothing more to say.” This ultimately led to her final novel, At Midnight God Enters the Garden of Eden, which picked up on the “feminist science-fiction”* elements of her first novel, The Flame Bearers. The unpublished novel recalled her major themes – mysticism, psychoanalysis, childhood trauma and healing —in a story of time-travel to the Holy Land.

Shortly before her 80th birthday, in 2020, she suffered a stroke while editing the finished draft of the novel. Chernin was in rehabilitation when she contracted COVID-19 amidst the COVID-19 pandemic in California. She died from the virus at a hospital on December 17, 2020. Both diary and the unfinished novel are archived at the Schlesinger Library together with all her papers, letters and unpublished works.

== Books ==
=== Non-fiction ===
- The Obsession: Reflections on the Tyranny of Slenderness: Harper & Row (1981); ISBN 0-06-092505-1
- The Hungry Self: Women, Eating and Identity: Times Books (1985); ISBN 0-06-092504-3
- Reinventing Eve: Modern Woman in Search of Herself: Times Books (1987); ISBN 0-06-092503-5
- The Woman Who Gave Birth to Her Mother: Viking (1998); ISBN 0-14-028466-4
- Seven Pillars of Jewish Denial: Shekinah, Wagner, and the Politics of the Small: North Atlantic Books (March 2, 2004); ISBN 1-55643-486-3
- Everywhere a Guest, Nowhere at Home: A New Vision of Israel and Palestine: North Atlantic Books (September 1, 2009); ISBN 1-55643-820-6
- Lesbian Marriage: A Love & Sex Forever Kit: Lesbian Love Forever (2014); ISBN 0-61-599236-6

=== Poetry ===
- The Hunger Song: The Menard Press (January 1983); ISBN 0-903400-80-4

=== Fiction ===
- The Flame Bearers: A Novel: Random House (1986); ISBN 0-06-097113-4
- Sex and Other Sacred Games: Crown (July 1, 1989); ISBN 0-8129-1676-X (with Renate Stendhal)
- The Girl Who Went and Saw and Came Back: Edgework Books; (February 2002); ISBN 1-931223-00-9

=== Memoirs ===
- In My Mother's House: Ticknor & Fields (1983); ISBN 1-931561-32-X
- Crossing the Border: An Erotic Autobiography: The Women's Press Ltd (October 13, 1994); ISBN 0-7043-4414-9
- A Different Kind of Listening: My Psychoanalysis and Its Shadow: Perennial (January 1996); ISBN 0-06-092689-9
- In My Father's Garden: A Daughter's Search for a Spiritual Life: Algonquin Books (January 7, 1996); ISBN 1-56512-100-7
- My Life as a Boy: A Woman's Story: Algonquin Books (January 5, 1997); ISBN 1-56512-163-5

=== Biography ===
- Cecilia Bartoli: The Passion of Song: Trafalgar Square Publishing; (November 1999); ISBN 0-7043-4623-0 (with Renate Stendhal)
