= George S. Klein =

American psychologist and psychoanalyst

George Stuart Klein (July 15, 1917 – April 11, 1971) was an American psychologist and psychoanalyst who made significant contributions in the experimental areas of the "new-look perception", "cognitive controls", "subliminal perception", "REM-dream" studies as well as in the advancement of psychoanalytic "ego psychology".

== Biography ==
Klein was born on July 15, 1917, in Brooklyn, New York. He received a B.A. from City College of New York in 1938, earned a Ph.D. in experimental/comparative psychology from Columbia University in 1942 and taught at Brooklyn College before entering military service as an aviation psychologist (1944–46). He was associated with the Menninger Foundation, based in Kansas, between 1946-52 under David Rapaport's tutelage in psychological testing and Freudian theory. At Menninger's, Klein pioneered a series of ground-breaking experiments in the wake of the emerging "new-look perception" field. In addition, Klein's conception of the intrinsic links between cognition, perception and personality led him to his pursuit of cognitive control, a conception that inspired a rich body of research over the years.

In 1953, Klein joined the New York University Department of Psychology's newly founded Research Center for Mental Health (RCMH) as co-director with Robert R. Holt. Funded by foundation grants, Air-Force contracts and a Center grant from the National Institute of Mental Health, it functioned as an integral part of NYU's clinical psychology program between 1953 and 1975. Under their direction psychological researchers experimented with "subliminal stimuli", "cognitive control", assessment of primary process thinking, and altered states of consciousness (i.e. "sensory deprivation", "LSD", "REM sleep").

Over the years, Klein held visiting professorships at several major universities, including Harvard, Berkeley, Chicago, Brandeis, and Clark. He was the recipient of the coveted National of Mental Health Research Career Awards and other honors. He was an ongoing consultant at the Austen Riggs Center in Stockbridge, Massachusetts; the founding editor of "Psychological Issues", an influential monograph series, served on several Journal boards and was a fellow of the American Psychological Association and member of the New York Psychoanalytic Society.

In the last decade of his life, Klein was deeply immersed in an attempt to disentangle the duality of explanations inherent in psychoanalytic theory, the experience-near clinical level from its abstract base, its metapsychology Designating the clinical level a "theory of personal encounter", Klein proposed the cognitive concepts—such as "meaning", "awareness", "peremptory ideation, and intentionality" as the more appropriate explanatory terms than the natural-science based concepts of drives, energies and mechanisms. His critical reappraisal of psychoanalytic theory, some of which were published in a series of earlier articles, were posthumously edited and integrated into his book Psychoanalytic Theory: An Exploration of Essentials.
