= Marilyn Charles =

American psychoanalyst and writer

- Born: 1951 (age 74–75)
- Education: University of New Mexico; Michigan State University (M.A., Ph.D.)
- Occupation: Psychoanalyst
- Employer: Austen Riggs Center

Marilyn Charles is a psychoanalyst, writer, lecturer and 2014–2015 President of the American Psychological Association's Division 39 (Psychoanalysis). Marilyn Charles has published articles and books on numerous topics, including trauma, Jacques Lacan, Wilfred Bion, creativity, and madness. She is on the staff at Austen Riggs Center, a co-chair of the Division 39 Early Career Committee, and a co-chair of the Association for Psychoanalysis, Society and Culture. She is a contributing editor of APCS's journal, Psychoanalysis, Culture and Society, which is published quarterly by Palgrave Macmillan. Marilyn is affiliated with Harvard Medical School, Boston Graduate School of Psychoanalysis, and the University of Monterrey, and is also a member of the Humanities and Psychoanalysis Committee. In 2014 Marilyn Charles received a leadership award at the 2014 APA Division 39 Spring Meeting, acknowledging her efforts in “the advancement of psychoanalytic psychology as a discipline and practice.”

== Selected publications ==
- Patterns: Building Blocks of Experience
- Constructing Realities: Transformations Through Myth and Metaphor
- Learning from Experience: a Guidebook for Clinicians
- Working with Trauma: Lessons from Bion and Lacan
- Psychoanalysis and Literature: The Stories We Live
- Introduction to Contemporary Psychoanalysis: Defining Terms and Building Bridges
- Fragments of Trauma and the Social Production of Suffering
- The Importance of Play in Early Childhood Education: Psychoanalytic, Attachment, and Developmental Perspectives
- Women & Psychosis: Multidisciplinary Perspectives
- Women and the Psychosocial Construction of Madness
