= Joshua Benton =

American journalist

Joshua Benton (born 1975) is an American journalist. He is a Senior Writer and the former director of the Nieman Journalism Lab at Harvard University, which he founded in 2008 and directed from 2008-2020.

Before moving to Harvard, Benton was an investigative reporter and columnist for The Dallas Morning News and a staff writer for The Toledo Blade. He won numerous national awards for his reporting, most notably on education. He wrote a series of stories on cheating on Texas' state test, the Texas Assessment of Knowledge and Skills, which led to state reforms and the permanent closure of the Wilmer-Hutchins Independent School District.

While attending Yale University, Benton was editor-in-chief of the student newspaper The Yale Herald. He was a Nieman Fellow at Harvard, a Pew Fellow in International Journalism at Johns Hopkins University, and a Jefferson Fellow at the East-West Center at the University of Hawaii.
