= Margaret Brenman-Gibson =

Margaret Brenman-Gibson (1918–2004) was an American psychologist, among the first to use of hypnosis in the treatment of neurosis resulting from war and related areas. She was the first non-physician to receive full clinical and research psychoanalytic training in America. In 1982 she was one of the first women to receive a Harvard professorship as Clinical Professor of Psychology. She earned a Masters in Anthropology from Columbia University and a doctorate in Psychology from the University of Kansas. She was the only female psychotherapist on the staff at the Austen Riggs Center and was recognized as a notable member of staff at the organization's centenary anniversary, playing a key role in the organization's establishment as a leading psychiatric hospital and treatment center. Her other work includes a biography of Clifford Odets, and narration of the film Erik Erikson: A Life’s Work. She was married to the playwright William Gibson from 1940 until her death in 2004.
