= Edward R. Shapiro =

American psychiatrist and psychoanalyst

Edward R. Shapiro is an American psychiatrist, psychoanalyst, and author. He served as Medical Director and Chief Executive Officer of the Austen Riggs Center from 1991 to 2011.

== Education ==
Shapiro graduated from Yale College and Stanford University, and earned his M.D. from Harvard Medical School. He completed his psychiatry residency at the Massachusetts Mental Health Center.

== Career ==
Early in his career, Shapiro held positions at the National Institute of Mental Health and served as director of adolescent and family treatment and psychosocial training at McLean Hospital. He is a clinical professor of psychiatry at the Yale Child Study Center.

From 1991 to 2011, Shapiro served as Medical Director and CEO of the Austen Riggs Center.

== Work ==
=== Lost in Familiar Places ===
Shapiro’s first book, Lost in Familiar Places (with A. Wesley Carr), explores the relationship between individual psychology and societal structures. It was reviewed in JAMA, the International Journal of Group Psychotherapy, Public Administration Review, Psychiatry, and the Bulletin of the Menninger Clinic.

=== Finding a Place to Stand ===
Shapiro’s 2019 book Finding a Place to Stand: Developing Self-Reflective Institutions, Leaders and Citizens examines how individuals and organizations manage anxiety, authority, and mission. Reviewing the book in Psychiatry, Brian W. Flynn wrote that it “connects developmental, organizational, and social perspectives” in addressing institutional and social functioning.

The International Journal of Applied Psychoanalytic Studies noted the book’s integration of psychoanalytic, organizational, and systems-psychodynamic perspectives.

The Psychoanalytic Quarterly published an extended review discussing Shapiro’s treatment of group dynamics, institutional processes, and leadership pressures within psychiatric settings.

== Selected works ==
- Lost in Familiar Places: Creating New Connections Between the Individual and Society (with A. Wesley Carr). Yale University Press, 1991.
- Finding a Place to Stand: Developing Self-Reflective Institutions, Leaders and Citizens. Phoenix Publishing House, 2019.
