= Mogul (company) =

Diversity recruitment company

- Company type: Private
- Available in: English
- Founded: 2014
- Headquarters: New York, New York, U.S.
- Area served: Worldwide
- Founder: Tiffany Pham David Pham
- Website: onmogul.com
- Registration: Optional (required for personalization, submission)
- Current status: Active

Mogul is a global executive search and leadership development firm, founded by American entrepreneurs Tiffany Pham and David Pham.

The company is backed by investors SoftBank Group and Hearst corporation, and provides executive search and AI and leadership training for Fortune 1000 clients including Walgreens, Chanel, UBS, Bristol Myers Squibb, Intuit, EBay, Nike, Inc., and Amazon (company).

== Awards and recognition ==
In 2014, Mogul was the winner of the Cadillac "IVY Innovator Award." Mogul was also honored by the United Nations, Forbes, Inc. (magazine), and Entrepreneur (magazine).

In 2016, Mogul launched the #IAmAMogul campaign featuring Chelsea Clinton and Mayor of Paris Anne Hidalgo to "inspire all women to realize that they too can be moguls, and that they have the power to shape the world through their voices and actions."

In 2020, Mogul became the subject of a case study by Harvard Business School called "Redefining Mogul."

Mogul was honored by the World Economic Forum as a "Technology Pioneer" of 2023.
