= UIF Corporation =

American financial service company

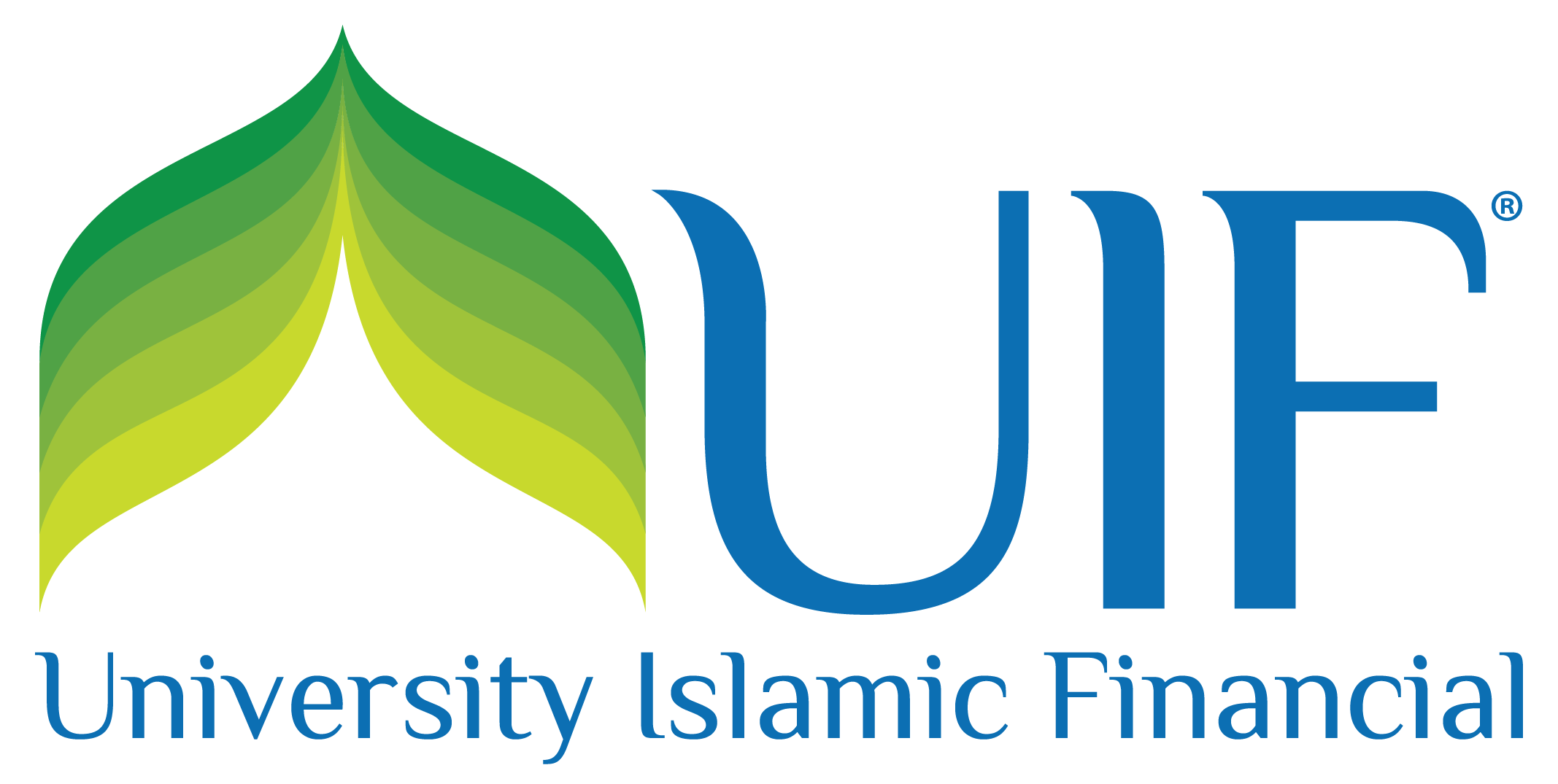
- Type: Subsidiary of University Bank
- Industry: Financial Services
- Founded: 2007
- Headquarters: Southfield, Michigan
- Key people: Stephen Lange Ranzini (CEO) Julie Burzynski (President)
- Products: Partnership, Musharaka
- Website: Official website

UIF Corporation (UIF) is an American financial service company headquartered in Southfield, Michigan. It provides residential and commercial real estate financing, vehicle financing, and time deposit savings accounts conforming to Islamic Sharia principles that prohibit the payment and receipt of riba (usually translated as interest or usury). Commercial real-estate financing and home financing are provided through the company's partnership programs.

UIF has received national media attention from NPR and The New York Times for its services, which are unusual in the United States and cater to the region's substantial Islamic community. UIF’s faith-based lending program has been highlighted in a speech of the Federal Reserve Bank of New York and in the official magazine of the Federal Reserve Bank of Richmond.

UIF currently offers financing, including murabaha and ijarah, in many U.S. states.
