= Tiffany Pham =

American entrepreneur (born 1986)

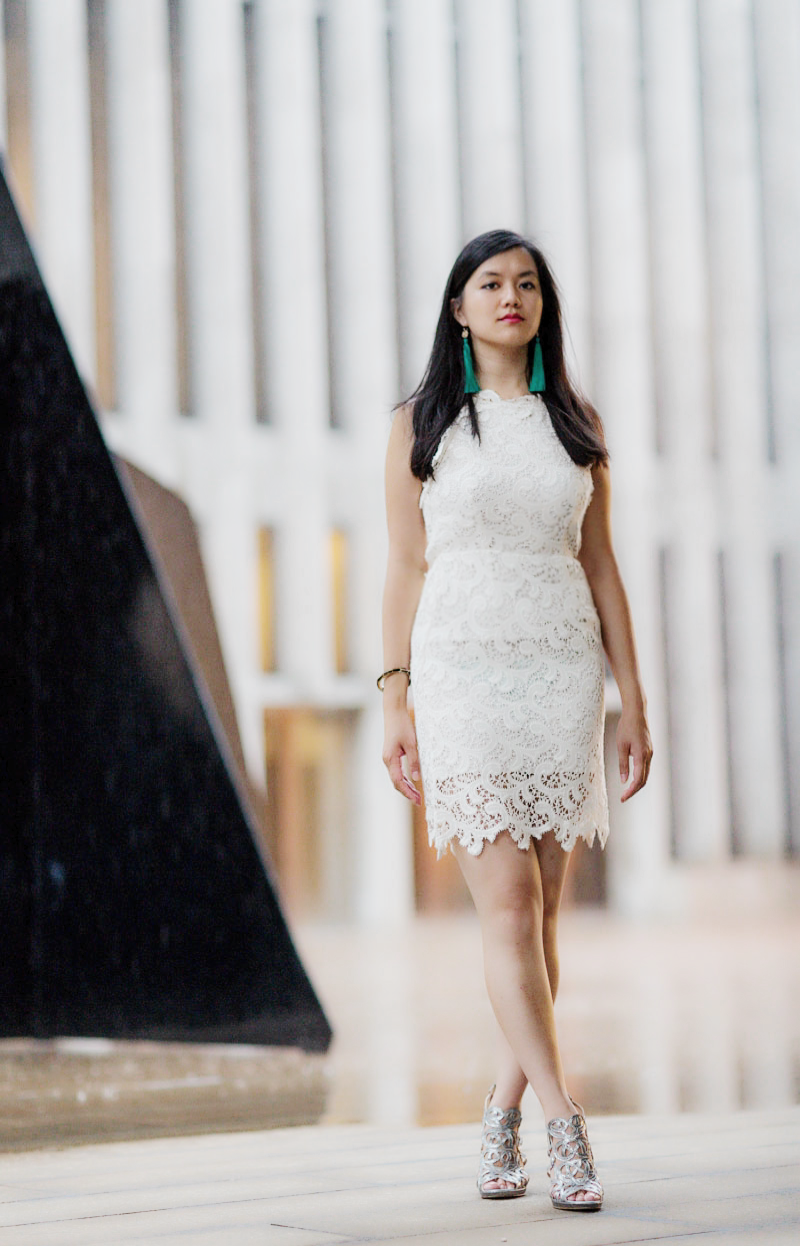
- Pham in New York City
- Born: November 27, 1986 (age 39)
- Education: Yale University, Harvard Business School
- Occupation: Entrepreneur
- Website: www.onmogul.com

Tiffany Pham (born 27 November 1986) is an American entrepreneur.

== Education ==
Pham earned a degree from Yale University and later attended Harvard Business School.

== Career ==
Pham is the founder of Mogul, a global executive search and leadership development firm that has received backing from investors including SoftBank Group and the Hearst Corporation.

She has appeared as a cast member on The History Channel programs The Machines That Built America and The Toys That Built America. Additionally, she has served as a judge on the TLC show Girl Starter, executive produced by Al Roker, and co-hosts The Positive Pushback, a program created by Jonathan Faulhaber, a veteran producer and director of The View.

Pham co-produced Girlfriend, which premiered at the Toronto International Film Festival, along with Funny Bunny (South by Southwest 2015) and AWOL (Tribeca Film Festival 2016). In 2013, she co-founded the Beijing International Screenwriting Competition in collaboration with the Beijing government.

She is the author of the Wall Street Journal bestselling book You Are a Mogul (2018) and has also written From Business Strategy to Information Technology Roadmap: A Practical Guide for Executives and Board Members and Girl Mogul.
