= Rose Chernin =

Russian-American activist (1901–1995)

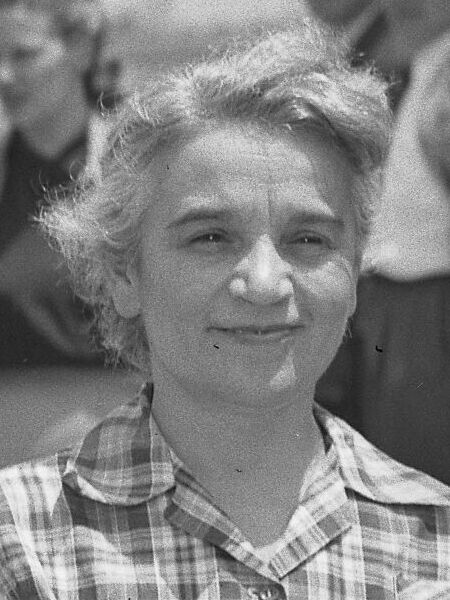
Chernin in 1951

Rose Chernin (September 14, 1901 – September 8, 1995) was a Russian-born naturalized U.S. citizen. She was a member of the Communist Party and became notable for her left-wing activism which eventually led to her arrest in 1951. She was charged with forming a conspiracy to overthrow the government under the Smith Act of 1940 and spent a year in jail. The Immigration and Naturalization Service attempted to deport her, but their efforts were preempted by the 1957 ruling by the Supreme Court of the United States that the Smith Act was unconstitutional.

== Personal life ==
Rose Chernin was born as Rochelle Chernin in Chasnik, Russia, in 1901. She and three younger sisters migrated to Waterbury, Connecticut with her mother, Perle, in 1913. After finishing grade school, Rose entered Crosby Preparatory School, where she encountered socialist ideas in an activist newspaper. She later attended Hunter College, but dropped out to participate in political activism through the Russian Club.

She married Paul Kusnitz in 1925, and moved to the Bronx where they had their first child, Nina, who would die of Hodgkin's disease in 1944. In 1940, Rose Chernin had her second daughter, Kim Chernin. Paul Kusnitz died in 1967. Rose Chernin died in Los Angeles of Alzheimer's disease in 1995.

== Political activities ==
Rose was active in local socialist causes including tenant advocacy and rent strikes. After becoming a US citizen in 1929, she joined the Communist Party in 1932, and her family briefly moved to Moscow, where she worked in publishing. She returned to America in 1934 after witnessing the arrest of fourteen communist activists under anti-organizing laws. The family returned to the Bronx.

After the death of Nina, the family moved to California. In Los Angeles, Chernin began another round of tenant advocacy and other activist work, such as protesting the deportation of British communist writer Henry Carlisle. She would first be threatened with deportation after being accused of participation in the Young Communist League. She also participated in actions on behalf of migrant agricultural workers.

== Arrest and release ==
Rose Chernin founded the Committee for the Protection of the Foreign Born in 1950. In July 1951 she was arrested for conspiracy to overthrow the government with bail set to $100,000. Under the Smith Act of 1940, advocacy for Marxism or Leninism was equated with advocating for the overthrow of the US government. She and other communists were arrested under the law. Chernin was sentenced five years in prison, and subpoenaed to identify conspirators to the House Un-American Committee, which she refused. She was threatened with denaturalization and deportation by the Immigration and Naturalization Service, but the process was abandoned for lack of evidence. In 1957, the Supreme Court overturned Chernin's conviction, deeming the Smith Act of 1940 unconstitutional.
