= University Bank =

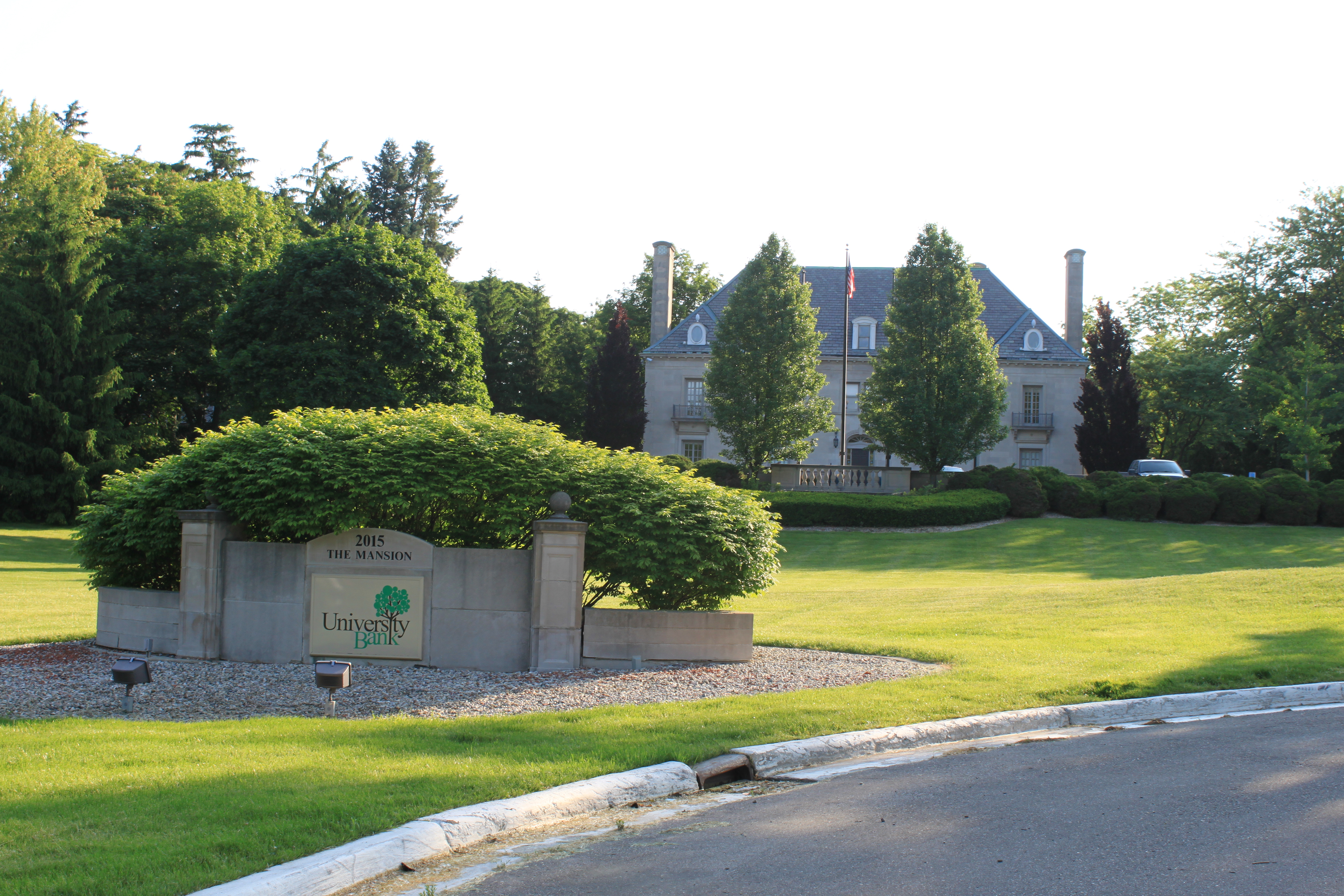
- University Bank's current headquarters in Ann Arbor is located in the historic Leander J. Hoover Mansion
- Company type: Subsidiary
- Traded as: OTCQB: UNIB
- Industry: Banking; Financial services
- Founded: 1890; 136 years ago (as The Newberry State Bank)
- Headquarters: Ann Arbor, Michigan, U.S.
- Key people: Stephen Lange Ranzini (President & CEO)
- Revenue: ▲US$125.395 million (Fiscal Year ended 31 December 2020)
- Operating income: ▲US$38.916 million (Fiscal Year ended 31 December 2020)
- Net income: ▲US$30.716 million (Fiscal Year ended 31 December 2020)
- Total assets: ▲US$557.676 million (Fiscal Year ended 31 December 2020)
- Total equity: ▲US$62.687 million (Fiscal Year ended 31 December 2020)
- Parent: University Bancorp, Inc.
- Subsidiaries: University Lending Group, Midwest Loan Services, UIF Corporation, Midwest Loan Solutions, Ann Arbor Insurance Centre
- Website: Official website

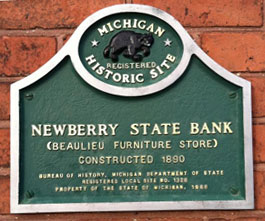
The original Newberry Bank Building in Newberry, Michigan was constructed in 1890 and today serves as the Beaulieu Furniture Store.

University Bank is a community bank headquartered in Ann Arbor, Michigan.

The bank was founded in 1890 in Newberry, Michigan, as The Newberry Bank and renamed The Newberry State Bank on May 3, 1908. In 1995, the bank sold its assets, adopted its current name, and moved to Ann Arbor. Its headquarters are in the Leander J. Hoover Mansion.

The bank is fully owned by University Bancorp. Along with its Michigan-based subsidiaries, the bank holds and manages more than $30.5 billion in financial assets for more than 163,000 customers. It has more than 500 employees.

== History ==
University Bank was founded in 1890 as the Newberry Bank, the only bank in the Upper Peninsula town of Newberry, Michigan. In 1908, it received a bank charter from the state of Michigan and changed its name to the Newberry State Bank.

In 1988, the University Bancorp bank holding company owned by Stephen Lange Ranzini and Joseph Ranzini acquired controlling interest in the bank. Under Ranzini, the bank expanded into Sault Ste. Marie and doubled in size.

In 1994, Newberry State Bank sold its loans, deposits, and branches to another bank in the Upper Peninsula. Ranzini retained the bank charter, renamed it University Bank, and moved it to Ann Arbor, where there was only one other community bank serving a diverse, vibrant and growing community. A new management team was recruited and the bank opened in Ann Arbor in early 1996. After the initial management team was replaced, Ranzini took over the direct day-to-day management of the bank in late 1997.

In 2009, the FDIC and Michigan Office of Financial and Insurance Regulation sent a cease-and-desist order to University Bank to stop conducting business with SWIFT and requiring more liquidity. The order also noted that the bank lacked an effective system of controls to comply with the Bank Secrecy Act.

University Bank has grown rapidly and has been profitable. Its annual revenue grew from $6.57 million in 2004 to over $140 million in 2020. Over those same 16 years, University Bank's return on shareholders' equity has averaged 20%, and common shareholders' equity grew from $3.0 million in 2004 to over $50 million in 2020.

== Subsidiaries ==
University Bank's subsidiaries include:

- University Lending Group, a retail residential mortgage originator based in Clinton Township.
- Midwest Loan Services, a residential mortgage subservicer based in Hancock
- UIF Corporation, an Islamic banking firm based in Southfield
- Midwest Loan Solutions, a reverse residential mortgage lender and warehouse lender based in Southfield
- University Bank, which provides traditional community banking services in the Ann Arbor metro area
- Ann Arbor Insurance Centre, an independent insurance agency based in Ann Arbor
