= Group for the Advancement of Psychiatry =

The Group for the Advancement of Psychiatry (GAP) is an American professional organization of psychiatrists dedicated to shaping psychiatric thinking, public programs and clinical practice in mental health. Its 29 committees meet semi-annually and choose their own topics for exploration. They explore issues and ideas on the frontiers of psychiatry and in applying psychiatric insights into general medical, social, and interpersonal problems.

== History of GAP ==
GAP was part of a larger move toward professionalization of the field. GAP was founded in May 1946 by a group of young psychiatrists who had served in World War II. They returned to the U.S. to find an inadequate system of civilian care and were impatient with the traditionalism of the American Psychiatric Association (which had originally been founded as an association of asylum superintendent). GAP was formed under the leadership of Dr. William C. Menninger and the "young turks" in American psychiatry who were eager to professionalize the field. Menninger wrote:

The organization of GAP was not a revolution. With the deepest sincerity, the founding group was seeking a way in which American psychiatry could give more forceful leadership, both medically and socially. Although the name may sound presumptuous, it was chosen because of the sense of great urgency that psychiatry should advance, and the belief that by hard work, and teamwork, we could help it do so. Those early years of GAP were marked by the feeling on the part of its membership that much needed to be done, and quickly.

== Publications ==
GAP's first published report (by the Committee on Therapy) was on the "promiscuous and indiscriminate use of electro-shock therapy." GAP's formulated policy to discuss controversial psychosocial issues was announced in 1950, in the Committee on Social Issues' Report, The Social Responsibility of Psychiatry, A Statement of Orientation. In that Report, the Committee noted that two factors had been influential in causing diverse social problems in psychiatry: the role of prejudice in determining attitudes towards social problems and the sparse knowledge about the relationship between society and personality. In this pioneering document, the Committee on Social Issues emphasized the social responsibility of psychiatry. It made a number of suggestions for broadening the conceptual framework of psychiatry to include: "redefinition of the concept of mental illness, emphasizing those dynamic principles which pertain to the person's interaction with society ... examination of the social factors which contribute to the causation of mental illness and also influence its course and outcome ... consideration of the specific group psychological phenomena which are relevant, in a positive sense, to community mental health ... the development of criteria for social action, relevant to the promotion of individual and community mental health." By 1955 the group was advocating an "objective critical attitude should orient the field.

GAP continued to produce position statements on relevant and controversial psychiatric issues such as abortion, drug use, sex crimes, school desegregation, loyalty oaths, nuclear energy, and euthanasia. Its "Report on homosexuality with particular emphasis on this problem in governmental agencies" (1955) criticized "witch hunts" against homosexuals working in the U.S. government. and the purging of homosexuals from the government.

== Membership ==
GAP is composed of over 200 leaders in psychiatry who meet twice a year to debate and think through pertinent issues in psychiatry. In over 50 years, GAP has shared Presidents with other national psychiatric organizations including: The American Psychiatric Association, the American College of Psychiatrists, and the American Academy of Child and Adolescent Psychiatry. GAP has researchers recognized nationally and internationally in the areas of addiction, geriatrics, child and adolescent psychiatry, terrorism and academics.

== Selected publications ==
- GAP, Committee on Addictions (2002). "Responsibility and Choice in Addiction," Short Report 22. Psychiatric Services 53(6).
- GAP, Committee on Adolescence. (1996). "Adolescent Suicide," Report 140.
- GAP, Committee on Adolescence. "Violent Behavior in Children and Youth: Preventive Intervention From A Psychiatric Perspective," Short Report 15, 1999, American Academy of Child & Adolescent Psychiatry
- GAP, Committee on Aging (2002). "Mental Health Problems in Assisted Living Residents." Short Report 23. Geriatrics 58(2).
- GAP, Committee on Aging. (2001). "Failure to Adequately Detect Suicidal Intent in Elderly Patients in the Primary Care Setting," Short Report 17. Clinical Geriatrics 9(7).
- GAP, Committee on Aging. (2000). "Schizophrenia and Older Adults an Overview: Directors for Research and Policy," Short Report 16. American Journal of Geriatrics 8(1).
- GAP, Committee on Child Psychiatry. (1999). "In the Long Run ... Longitudinal Studies of Psychopathology in Children," Report 143.
- GAP, Committee on Cultural Psychiatry. (2001). "Cultural Assessment in Clinical Psychiatry," Report 145.
- GAP, Committee on Government Policy. (1994). "Forced into Treatment: The Role of Coercion in Clinical Practice," Report 137.
- GAP, Committee on Handicaps. (1992). "Caring for People with Physical Impairment: The Journey Back," Report 135.
- GAP, Committee on Human Sexuality. (2000). Homosexuality and the mental health professions: The impact of bias. Hillsdale, NJ: Analytic Press.
- GAP, Committee on International Relations.. (1987). "Us and Them: The Psychology of Ethnonationalism," Report 123.
- GAP, Committee on Medical Education. (1982). "Survival Manual for Medical Students," Report 108.
- GAP, Committee on Preventive Psychiatry. (1989). "Psychiatric Prevention and Family Life Cycle: Risk Reduction by Frontline Practitioners," Report 127.
- GAP, Committee on Psychiatry and Law. (2018). Family Murder: Pathologies of Love and Hate (ed. Susan Hatters-Friedman).
- GAP, Committee on Psychiatry and Law. (2019). rom Courtroom to Clinic: Legal Cases that Changed Mental Health Treatment (ed. Peter Ash). Cambridge University Press.
- GAP, Committee on Psychiatry and Religion. (1992). "Leaders and Followers: A Psychiatric Perspective on Religious Cults," Report 132.
- GAP, Committee on Psychopathology. (2001) "Reexamination of Therapist Self Disclosure," Short Report 19. Psychiatric Services 52(11).
- GAP, Committee on Public Education. (1974). "The Joys and Sorrows of Parenthood," Report 84.
