= Chestnut Lodge =

Former psychiatric hospital in Maryland, United States

Coordinates: 39°5′1.3″N 77°9′46.7″W

Chestnut Lodge (formerly known as Woodlawn Hotel) was a historic building in Rockville, Maryland, United States, well known as a psychiatric institution. Located at 500 West Montgomery Avenue, it was a contributing property to the West Montgomery Avenue Historic District. The building was destroyed by fire in 2009, and the site is now a city park.

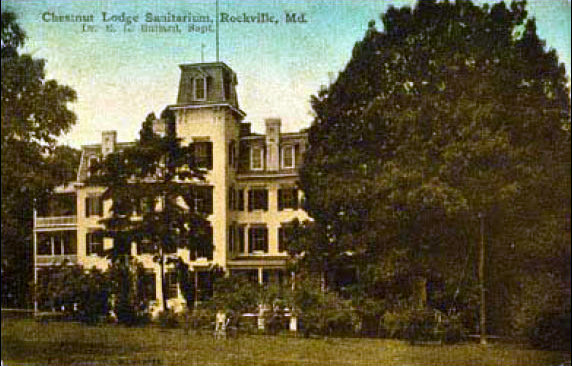
Hand colored photographic postcard of Chestnut Lodge Sanitorium postmarked 1909

== History ==
=== Early history ===
In 1886, Charles G. Willson commissioned an architect to build a four-story brick "summer boarding house" on 5 acres (2.0 ha) of land he had purchased in the west of Rockville. During the construction of the building, Willson filed for bankruptcy, and the unfinished building was bought for $6,000 by Mary J. Colley (the owner of the Clarendon Hotel in Washington, D.C.) and her partner Charles W. Bell. Under their ownership, the building was opened as the Woodlawn Hotel in the spring of 1889. The hotel boasted electric bells, gas lighting, and 40 luxurious guest rooms. Catering to rich visitors from Washington who boarded in the hotel during the summer months, it was initially quite successful.

In 1900, town officials refused to allow the Washington & Rockville Railway to begin operating streetcars until the company fulfilled its agreement to extend tracks from Courthouse Square west to the hotel.

After a decade or so of prosperity, however, the fortunes of the Woodlawn Hotel declined as many of its semi-permanent residents moved into new houses in Rockville. In 1906, the hotel's owners were heavily in debt and were forced to sell the building and grounds at public auction.

=== Psychiatric hospital ===
The hotel was purchased by Ernest Luther Bullard (1859–1931), a native of Milwaukee, Wisconsin, a surgeon and professor of psychiatry and neurology. Bullard renovated the building and re-opened it in 1910 as a sanatorium for the care of nervous and mental diseases, renaming it Chestnut Lodge after the 125 chestnut trees that grew on the grounds.

For many years, Bullard was the sole physician working at the Lodge, but over the next 75 years a total of three generations of the Bullard family operated the private hospital. Many nationally renowned therapists, including psychoanalytic psychiatrist Clarence Edward Bunge, Frieda Fromm-Reichmann, Wayne Fenton, Thomas McGlashan, Harold Searles, and Otto Allen Will Jr., worked at the hospital over the years. The hospital was the site for a series of influential studies on the long-term treatment outcome for psychiatric conditions, known as the Chestnut Lodge studies.

In the 1950s and 1960s, innovative dance therapist Marian Chace had regularly scheduled sessions with groups of patients. Judith Richardson Bunney followed her in this work. In the 1960s and 1970s, Donn B. Murphy conducted a drama group for patients. One of the core therapeutic features of Chestnut Lodge was to encourage the individuality of both patient and staff. This was found to have stimulated creativity and both groups benefitted by overcoming pressures to conform.

The psychiatric work performed at Chestnut Lodge was detailed in the 1954 book, "The Mental Hospital." The book provides insight into both the positive and negative aspects of mental health treatment at the time. Written by three psychiatrists, the work delves into many of the factors influencing patient and staff interaction. The lodge was also the setting for J. R. Salamanca's 1961 novel "Lilith", which was turned into a film of the same name directed by Robert Rossen in 1964.

In 1980, Raphael Osheroff, a nephrologist and father of three, sued Chestnut Lodge for negligence. In his complaint, Osheroff claimed that "the staff failed to prescribe drugs and instead treated him according to the psychodynamic and social model.” The lawsuit was settled in 1987 by an agreement between the two parties.

In 1997, the lodge was purchased by CPC Health, and was obtained by the Washington Waldorf School in 2001 when CPC Health declared bankruptcy. In December 2003, the property was conveyed to Chestnut Lodge Properties, LLC.

== Redevelopment plans ==
In 2006 the City of Rockville approved the developer's proposal to build single-unit homes on the property, convert the historic main lodge building into condominium units, and retain most of the remaining historic structures.

== 2009 building fire ==
Around 3 a.m. on Sunday, June 7, 2009, the unoccupied structure caught fire and collapsed. No one was injured. The cause of the fire was not immediately known.

== Park creation ==
Single-unit homes were built in the rear portion of the property. In 2015 the developer proposed to build townhouses on the site of the former lodge building. In 2016 the city rejected the townhouse proposal.

In 2017 the city acquired over 6 acres of the Chestnut Lodge property from the developer and established a public park on the site. In 2020 the city reached agreement to acquire the remaining land from the developer, for the purpose of expanding the size of the existing park.
