= Austen Riggs Center =

Psychiatric treatment in Stockbridge, Massachusetts, US

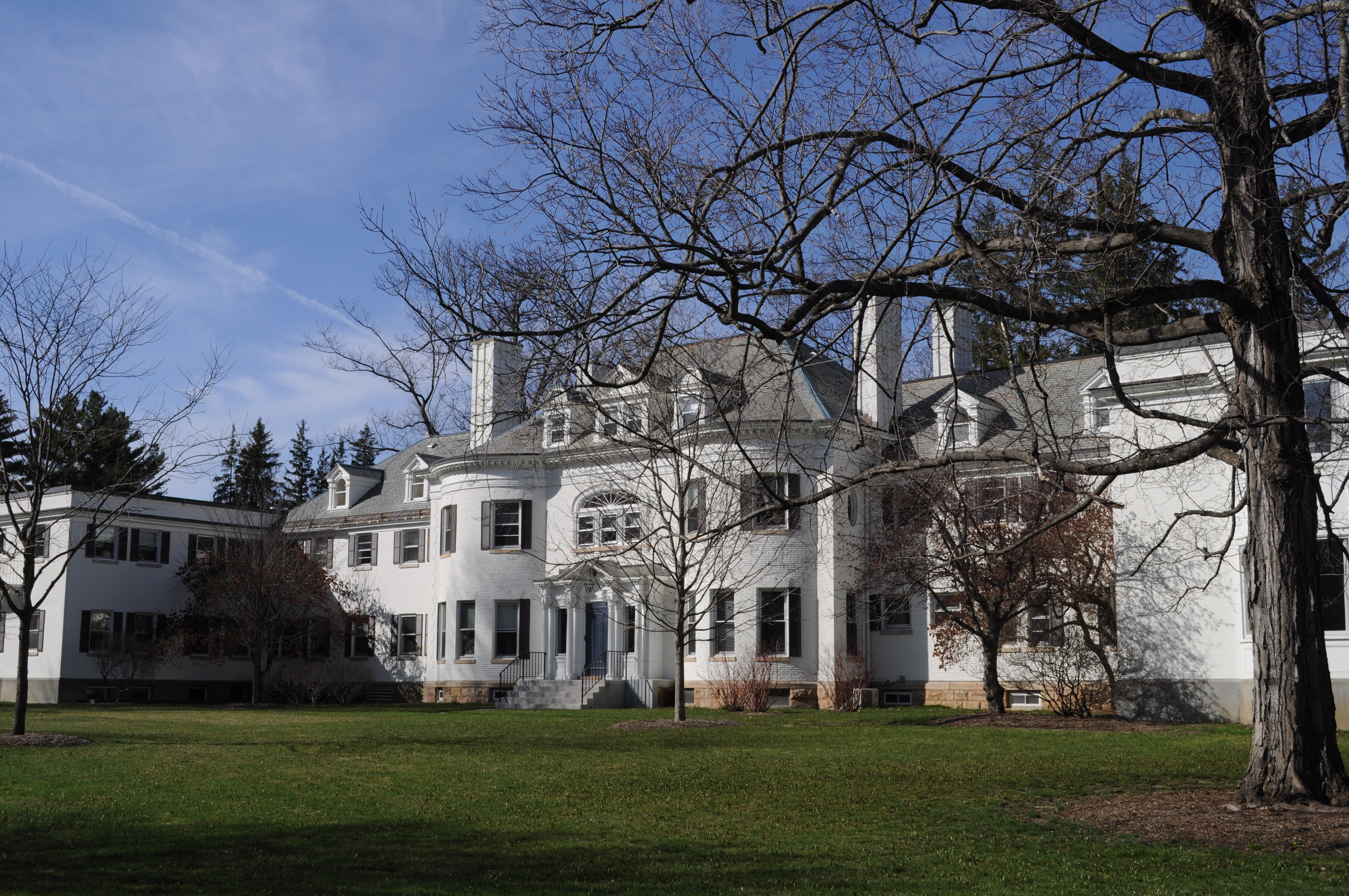

Geography
- Location: Stockbridge, Massachusetts, Berkshire County, Massachusetts, United States
- Coordinates: 42°16′59.1″N 73°18′47.9″W

Organization
- Type: Specialist
- Affiliated university: Cambridge Health Alliance, Yale Child Study Center, Yale University School of Medicine

Services
- Standards: Joint Commission
- Beds: 74
- Specialty: Residential Treatment Center

History
- Opened: July 21, 1919; 107 years ago

Links
- Website: http://www.austenriggs.org/
- Lists: Hospitals in Massachusetts

The Austen Riggs Center is a psychiatric treatment facility in Stockbridge, Massachusetts. Founded in 1913 as the Stockbridge Institute for the Study and Treatment of Psychoneuroses, it was renamed the Austen Fox Riggs Foundation in 1919.

== History ==
=== Founding to 1946 ===
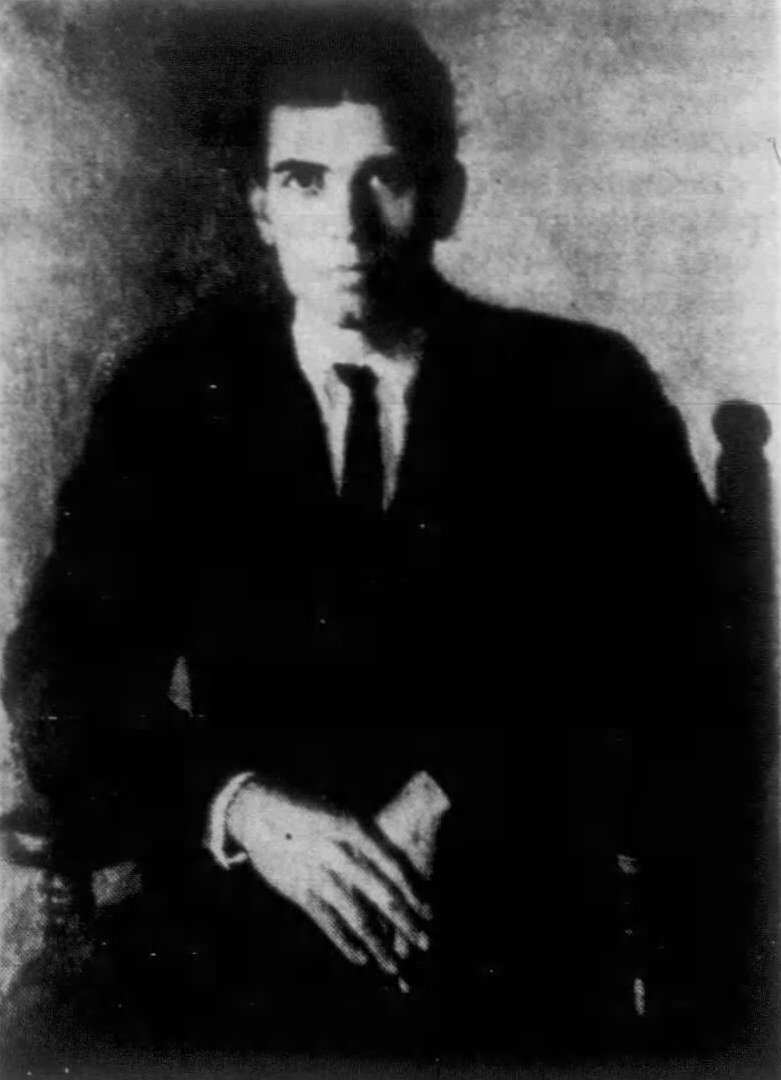
Austen Fox Riggs in 1913

Austen Fox Riggs was a New York City internist who retired to Stockbridge while suffering from tuberculosis. He developed a treatment approach with a purpose to "integrate talk therapy with a structured daily routine, carefully balancing work, leisure, rest, and physical activity."

The treatment approach was influenced by the mental hygiene movement (also known as the social hygiene movement). He developed his residential model after observing a physician in Bethel, Maine named John George Gehring, who treated patients through strict daily regimens and suggestions.

Opened in 1913 as The Stockbridge Institute for the Study and Treatment of the Psychoneuroses, the Institute was incorporated in 1919 as the Austen Riggs Foundation. By 1924 the Riggs Foundation had 100 patients with an average stay of four to six weeks. The staff consisted of doctors handling no more than 10 patients each. Physicians-in-training joined regular staff meetings and conferences. Patients were encouraged to be "a valuable member of a united team." Patients included figures such as Ruth Wales du Pont, who spent three weeks at the institution in 1924.

A colleague described Riggs as having a "deep and almost Puritanic conviction that feeling must be kept under constant surveillance and control by doing." His hospital had an occupational therapy shop that included weaving, carpentry, painting, and other handicrafts, as well as rooms for games and recreation. Riggs also developed a "10 Commandments" for successful living.

Though he denounced what he called Sigmund Freud's "mental gymnastics" and criticized the Viennese doctor’s emphasis on sexual conflicts as the root of neurosis, Riggs's practices had commonalities with the emerging field of psychoanalysis. He believed neurotics to be troubled by the "residues of past experience" and that they would heal in part by self-knowledge and adaptation to practical realities. Where Freud spoke of defense mechanisms, Riggs once said that a patient "cannot be deprived of the protection of his neuroses." Where Freud spoke of coming to grips with the ordinary unhappiness of the world, Riggs studied the problem of "magnifying suffering by making a personal quarrel with pain." The American Journal of Psychiatry has called Riggs' system "a fully integrated conceptual system of ego psychology" that preceded Sigmund Freud's attention to the field by ten years. Riggs also read Freud in the original German, as well as Pierre Janet and Jean-Martin Charcot in French.

Riggs authored several notable works, including Play: Recreation in a Balanced Life, Intelligent Living, and Just Nerves. The New York Times described him as an "internationally known psychiatrist" who "gained widespread public recognition through his writings."

=== 1947–1967 ===
In 1947, Dr. Robert P. Knight, the former chief of staff of the Menninger Foundation, became the medical director at Riggs. A friend of Anna Freud and well-known in American psychoanalysis, Knight emphasized talk therapy and rehabilitation and avoided more extreme therapies widely used in psychiatric hospitals of the time, for example electroconvulsive therapy, insulin shock therapy, and lobotomy.

Knight, who served as president of both the American Psychiatric Association and the American Psychoanalytic Foundation, was an authority on borderline personality disorder, which he said referred to patients who were "quite sick but not frankly psychotic." Under his direction, the facility began to receive more seriously ill patients and developed practices based on Knight's ideas that borderline patients needed a combination of structure and freedom to negotiate their path toward health.

Early in Knight's tenure, he convened a conference of patients and staff to work out the philosophy and procedures of a therapeutic community.

By 1948, Knight had brought with him what the scholar Lawrence J. Friedman has called "the creative core of Menninger's clinical psychology department and its research staff," including David Rapaport, Roy Schafer, and Merton Gill (who wrote the text Diagnostic Psychological Testing) and Margaret Brenman-Gibson, the first non-physician to receive full clinical and research psychoanalytic training in the United States.

In 1951, Erik Erikson joined the staff at Riggs, completing a team that, according to an article in the Harvard Gazette, "turned the grand experiment of treating very troubled patients in an open therapeutic community into a Golden Age of conceptual and clinical inventiveness." According to Friedman, Erikson "compared Riggs to the safe sanitarium in the Alps that Thomas Mann had characterized in The Magic Mountain."

During the Eriksons' residence in Stockbridge, Joan Erikson, an artist and dancer, directed the Riggs' Activities Program, which she expanded to include theater, dance, painting, sculpture, woodwork, gardening, and music. She also founded a formal Montessori kindergarten for local families, in which Riggs' patients could apprentice—a program that continues today.

The theater program at Austen Riggs was also influenced by William Gibson, the playwright known for The Miracle Worker. While in Stockbridge, Gibson wrote a novel called The Cobweb, set at a psychiatric hospital, which was turned into a film starring Richard Widmark and Lauren Bacall.

Erikson pointed out that the Activities Program assisted in preventing patients from succumbing to a narrow, negative identity produced by immersion in the "patient role." He credited his wife's work with teaching him the "curative as well as creative role of work," which he found to be prominent in the life of Martin Luther.

Erikson also used his experience at Riggs to pursue the ideas he developed in his book Childhood and Society, which proposed a series of eight normative crises in every life, with potential at each stage for healthy growth and integration—and also pathologic development and mental illness.

=== 1967–1991 ===
In 1967, after Knight's death, Dr. Otto Allen Will, Jr., formerly of Chestnut Lodge, became director of Austen Riggs and brought his understanding of early attachment problems and psychotic vulnerability to the treatment program. According to his New York Times obituary, "Dr. Will was one of a small number of psychoanalysts who devoted their careers to trying to understand psychotic patients through long, intensive, therapeutic relationships with them." The Times noted that Will wrote in more than 85 papers about how psychotic thought states might be changed using only psychotherapy. Will retired in 1978 as medical director at Austen Riggs but continued on the hospital's board until his death.

Dr. Daniel P. Schwartz, the former director of the Yale Psychiatric Hospital, directed Austen Riggs from 1978 to 1991 and oversaw the hospital in an era in which both managed care and biological psychiatry came to dominate the field, and in which many hospitals focusing on long-term psychotherapy – including Chestnut Lodge, the McLean Hospital, the Westchester Division of New York-Presbyterian Hospital, Timberlawn, Sheppard Pratt, and Menninger's—changed their missions.

During this time (1985–1988), Christopher Bollas, PhD, served as director of education at the Austen Riggs Center.

=== 1991–2011 ===
In 1991, Edward R. Shapiro became the Medical Director and CEO of the Austen Riggs Center. An authority on family and organizational systems, Shapiro expanded Riggs' focus on involving family members in the treatment process and increased the number of social workers on staff from one to eight. He also positioned Riggs as a resource for individuals considered "treatment-resistant"—those who had not responded successfully to care elsewhere.

During his tenure, Riggs expanded its residential capacity and introduced more cost-effective step-down program options. Shapiro retired in June 2011.

=== 2011–2015 ===
Donald Rosen, MD was appointed medical director/CEO in July 2011. After Rosen departed from the center in March 2013, Dr. James L. Sacksteder assumed the role of medical director/CEO of Austen Riggs. Dr. Sacksteder served as director of patient care before becoming the organization's leader, and he remained at Riggs for four decades.

Dr. Sacksteder wrote over twenty articles and book chapters on the treatment of anorexia nervosa, long-term psychoanalytically-oriented psychotherapy of severely disturbed patients, narcissism, object relations theory, and ego psychology. He is co-editor of Attachment in the Therapeutic Process with Daniel P. Schwartz, M.D., and Yoshiharu Akabane, M.D.: (International University Press, 1987). Dr. Sacksteder was a lecturer at Smith College School of Social Work for over twenty years. Sacksteder retired in June 2015.

=== 2015–2018 ===
Andrew J. Gerber, MD, PhD, became the medical director/CEO at the Austen Riggs Center In July 2015. Before coming to Riggs, he served as the director of the Magnetic Resonance Imaging Research Program at the New York State Psychiatric Institute, the director of research at the Columbia University Center for Psychoanalytic Training and Research and an assistant professor of psychiatry in the Division of Child and Adolescent Psychiatry at Columbia University Medical Center. Dr. Gerber also had a private psychoanalytic practice while in New York. During his tenure at Austen Riggs, Dr. Gerber established several initiatives in human development, suicide research and education.

=== 2018–2024 ===
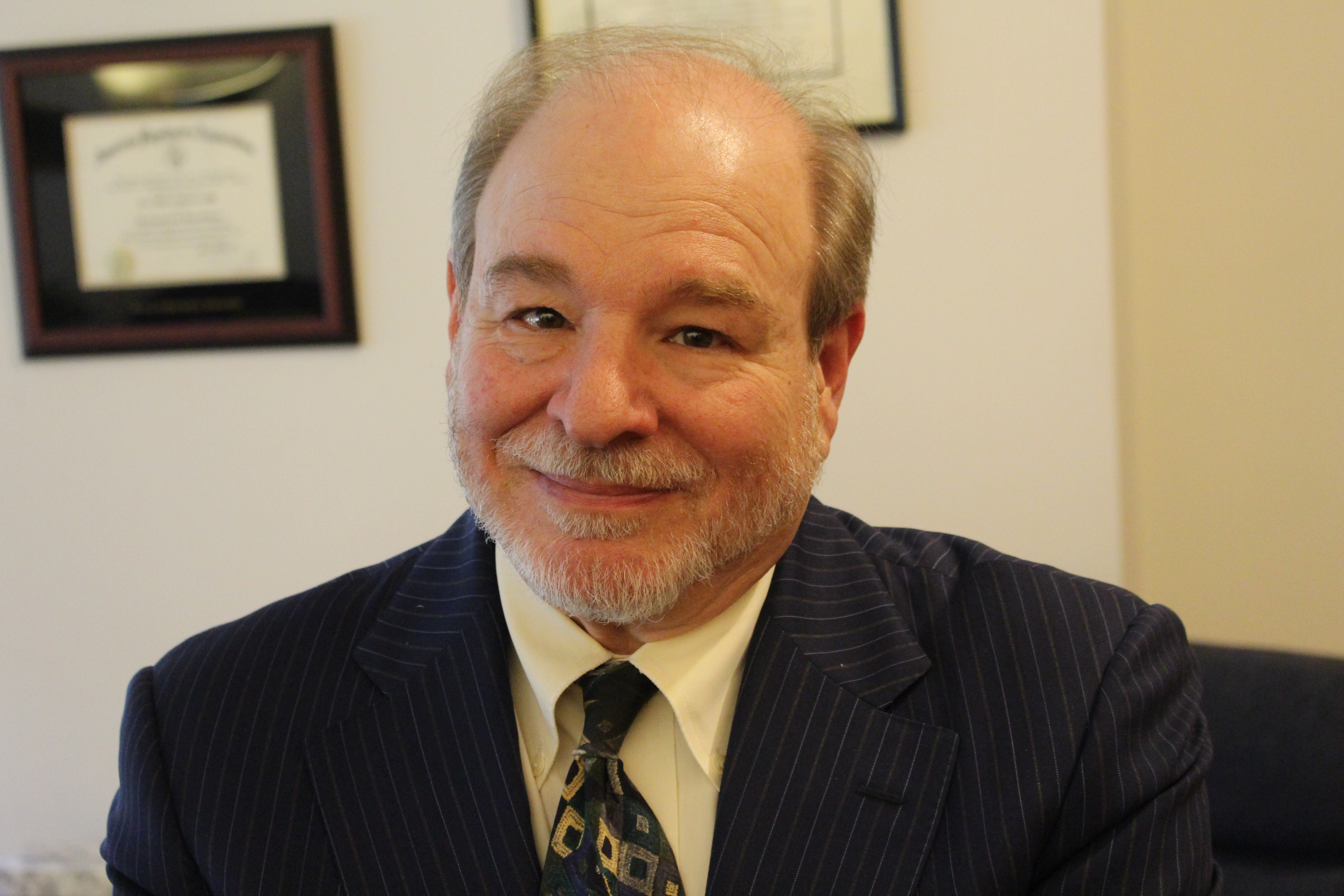
Dr. Eric Plakun in his Austen Riggs office in 2016

Eric Plakun, a psychiatrist at the Austen Riggs Center for more than 40 years, was named Medical Director/CEO in November 2018. Plakun previously served as a witness in the 2019 Wit v. United Behavioral Health class-action suit.

In 2019, the Austen Riggs Center marked the centennial year of its founding. It partnered with the Norman Rockwell Museum on an exhibition about the relationship between Rockwell and Erik Erikson, opened an exhibition on its history and the history of mental health care in America, and convened an international conference on the mental health crisis in America.

=== Other notable staff ===
Marilyn Charles, 2014–2015 President of the American Psychological Association's Division 39 (Psychoanalysis) is a member of the therapy staff at Austen Riggs.

== Treatment approach ==
At a time of rapid decrease in psychotherapy—just 29 percent of office-based visits to psychiatrists involved psychotherapy in 2004–2005, down from 44 percent in 1996–1997—the Austen Riggs Center organizes its treatment around intensive psychodynamic psychotherapy with a clinical psychologist or psychiatrist four times weekly. Riggs maintains a long-term residential treatment model in an era of managed care that emphasizes short-term hospitalizations and outpatient treatment for the seriously mentally ill. Though medication is administered to a vast majority of Riggs' patients, Riggs follows the principles of "psychodynamic psychopharmacology," which pays attention to the demonstrated ways in which relationships between patients and mental health professionals impact the efficacy of the medication.

Riggs provides an open and voluntary program. The minimum stay is six weeks and the median stay is six months. Following the reorganization of the Menninger Foundation in 2003, according to The New York Times, Riggs is considered one of the last "elite private hospitals", where patients may engage in long-term psychotherapy.

The Austen Riggs Center focuses its attention on individuals with serious mental illnesses for whom repeated treatments in outpatient settings have proved ineffective.

== Erikson Institute ==
The Erikson Institute for Education and Research, an integral part of the Austen Riggs Center named for Erik Erikson, was founded in 1994. The Erikson Institute hosts scholars in residence, holds conferences and lectures, supports clinical research, and helps to facilitate community engagement (such as film screenings and roundtable discussions) and organizational partnerships. The Erikson Institute also offers a four-year fellowship in psychoanalytic psychotherapy and manages the Austen Fox Riggs Library, a collection of 18,000 items of scholarly interest. Dr. Jane G. Tillman is currently the Evelyn Stefansson Nef Director of the Erikson Institute.

The Erikson Institute awarded the Erikson Institute Prize for Excellence in Mental Health Media from 2010-2023 "to recognize and encourage writers, journalists, and media experts who have produced sophisticated and accessible work on mental health issues." Past winners have included artist Alison Bechdel, writer Andrew Solomon and radio journalist Alix Spiegel.
