= Andrew J. Gerber =

American psychoanalyst

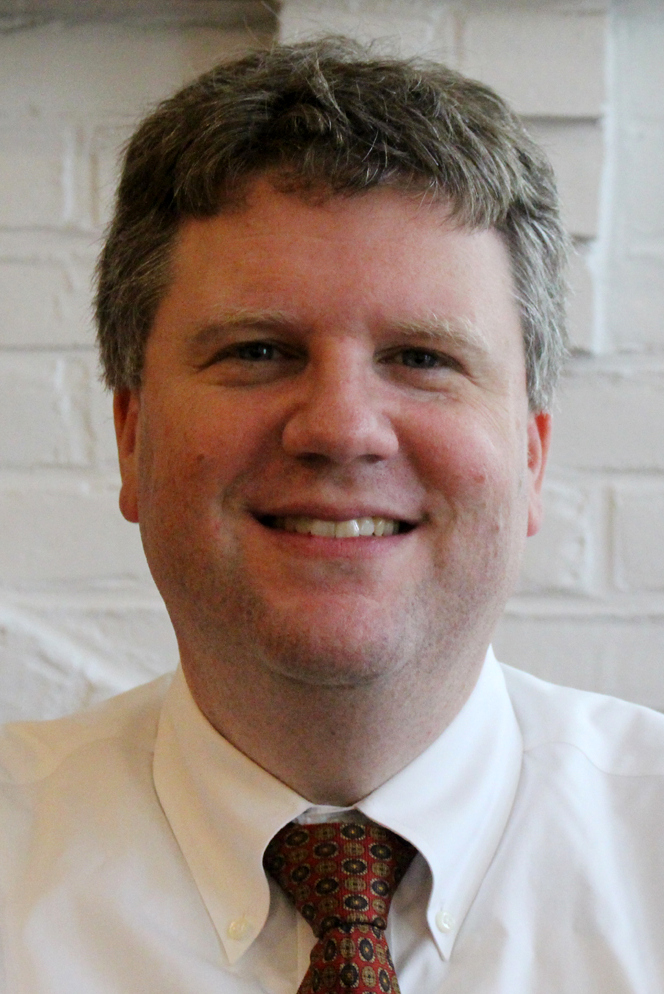
- Education: Yale University (BS); University College London (MSc, PhD); Harvard Medical School (MD)
- Scientific career
- Fields: Psychoanalysis
- Workplaces: Silver Hill Hospital

Andrew J. Gerber is an American psychoanalyst and the current president and medical director of Silver Hill Hospital in New Canaan, Connecticut. His principal interests and research lie in studying the neurobiological bases of social cognition, particularly in relation to autism spectrum disorders and change in response to psychotherapy. He is a member of the American Academy of Child and Adolescent Psychiatry, American Psychiatric Association, American Psychoanalytic Association and the Psychoanalytic Psychodynamic Research Society.

== Career ==
Gerber completed his medical and psychiatric training at Harvard Medical School, Cambridge Hospital and Weill Cornell Medical College – Payne Whitney Clinic, where he served as chief resident; and his child psychiatry training at the combined Columbia-Cornell NewYork–Presbyterian Hospital program, where he was also chief resident.

He earned a PhD in psychology at University College London, where he studied with Peter Fonagy and Joseph J. Sandler investigating the process and outcome of psychotherapy in young adults. Their findings suggested that individuals rated as dismissing on the Adult Attachment Interview (AAI) were more likely to show improvements in psychotherapy.

Gerber has also served as the director of the Magnetic Resonance Imaging Research Program at the New York State Psychiatric Institute, the director of research at the Columbia University Center for Psychoanalytic Training and Research and maintained a private psychoanalytic practice while in New York.

== Evidence Base for Psychoanalysis ==
Gerber has researched and written on the intersection of neuroscience and psychoanalysis, arguing for a "both and" approach that leverages some of the empirical data from neuroscience to bolster our understanding of psychotherapeutic interventions for individuals struggling with psychiatric issues. The New York Times article, Tell It About Your Mother: Can brain-scanning help save Freudian psychoanalysis? details some of his research on psychoanalysis as well as his studies combining psychoanalytic thinking and brain imaging. Gerber has also worked to develop a model for an empirically-based psychoanalytic curriculum designed to make psychoanalytic education more inclusive and more responsive to practical and ethical demands for evidence-based treatments.

== Research ==
Gerber is the director of research at the Columbia Center for Psychoanalytic Training and Research and a research scientist at the New York State Psychiatric Institute. He has used neuroimaging to study measureable changes in brain function in children and adolescents after psychotherapy, and has conducted research around numerous psychiatric disorders including depression, anxiety and panic disorder.

== Selected publications ==
- Peter Fonagy, Tom Leigh, Miriam Steele, Howard Steele, Roger Kennedy, Gretta Mattoon, Mary Target, Andrew Gerber. "The relation of attachment status, psychiatric classification, and response to psychotherapy." Journal of consulting and clinical psychology. 64, no. 1 (1996).
- Rachel Marsh, Andrew J Gerber, Bradley S Peterson. "Neuroimaging studies of normal brain development and their relevance for understanding childhood neuropsychiatric disorders." Journal of the American Academy of Child & Adolescent Psychiatry 47, no. 11 (2008): 1233-1251.
- Kanne, Stephen M, Andrew J. Gerber, Linda M. Quirmbach, Sara S. Sparrow, Domenic V. Cicchetti, and Celine A. Saulnier. "The role of adaptive behavior in autism spectrum disorders: implications for functional outcome." Journal of Autism and Developmental Disorders 41, no. 8 (2011): 1007-18.
