= Otto Allen Will Jr. =

American physician

Otto Allen Will Jr. (April 26, 1910 – November 17, 1993) was an American psychiatrist whose work in psychoanalysis focused on treatment of patients with schizophrenia using intensive psychotherapy. He is also credited for his advancement of attachment theory and milieu therapy.

== Training ==
Will received his medical degree from Stanford University, School of Medicine. After his residency and service in the U.S. Navy during World War II, he received post-doctorate training at Washington School of Psychiatry and the Washington Psychoanalytic Institute. Through this training he joined the Interpersonal psychoanalysis movement founded by Harry Stack Sullivan, Frieda Fromm-Reichmann, and others.

== Professional life ==
He served as Director of Psychotherapy at Chestnut Lodge from 1954 to 1967. From Chestnut Lodge, he was hired as Medical Director for the Austen Riggs Center. During his work at both institution he establish an international reputation for his work with schizophrenic patients using intensive psychotherapy instead of biological or psychopharmacological treatments.
