= Jay Greenberg (psychoanalyst) =

- Born: Jay R. Greenberg; 3 October 1942 (age 83); Brooklyn, New York
- Education: PhD Psychology, New York University; BA, University of Chicago
- Occupations: psychoanalyst, clinical psychologist and writer
- Years active: 1978–present
- Known for: leading psychoanalyst at William Alanson White Institute, authority on relational psychoanalysis

Jay R. Greenberg (born October 3, 1942) is a psychoanalyst, clinical psychologist and writer. He holds a PhD in Psychology from New York University. He is a Faculty Member of the William Alanson White Institute, where he is also a training analyst and supervisor.

Greenberg was one of the originators of relational psychoanalysis, though he is now less closely identified with it. Since 2011 he is the Editor of The Psychoanalytic Quarterly. He is the 2015 recipient of the Mary S. Sigourney Award for Outstanding Achievement in Psychoanalysis.

== Early life and education ==
Greenberg was born in Brooklyn, New York on October 3, 1942. He grew up in Brooklyn and Queens until he went to college in 1959. He received a BA degree from the University of Chicago in 1963.

After two years of study in philosophy at the University of Chicago, he enrolled in the Clinical Psychology program at New York University, where in 1974 he received his Ph.D., writing his dissertation on “An Analysis of Diagnostic Decision Making as a Function of the Nature of Clinical Setting”.

Greenberg then entered analytic training at the William Alanson White Institute, receiving his Certificate in 1978.

== Recent career ==
Since 1978 Greenberg has been affiliated with the William Alanson White Institute, currently as a faculty member, supervisor, and training analyst. Through this Institute he has been influenced by its founders, Harry Stack Sullivan, Erich Fromm, Frieda Fromm-Reichmann and Clara Thompson.

Since 2011 he is the Editor of The Psychoanalytic Quarterly. From 1994 to 2001 he served as Editor of Contemporary Psychoanalysis and from 2007 to 2010 as Editor for North America of The International Journal of Psychoanalysis.

== Contribution to psychoanalysis ==
Greenberg, along with Stephen Mitchell, was one of the main originators of relational psychoanalysis, a new development in psychoanalysis which is in part a further development of interpersonal psychoanalysis and object relations theory. The influence remains through their book Object Relations in Psychoanalytic Theory and a key article in Contemporary Psychoanalysis. A complete issue of Contemporary Psychoanalysis was devoted to the much-quoted Object Relations in Psychoanalytic Theory in 2013, the 30th anniversary of its publication.

In his second book, Oedipus and Beyond, Greenberg further develops his deep and careful interpretation of the history of psychoanalytic thinking, and its implications for clinical practice.

In more than 70 articles and book chapters, Greenberg has made a number of contributions to comparative psychoanalysis, to the history of psychoanalytic ideas, and to moving forward the theory of therapeutic action and of ways of understanding the nature of psychological conflict. Several interviews have been devoted over the years to Greenberg and his influence on psychoanalytic theory and clinical practice.

Greenberg has a long-standing interest in Greek tragedy, which has a noticeable influence on his thinking about psychoanalysis.

== Awards and prizes ==
Greenberg is the 2015 recipient of the Mary S. Sigourney Award for Outstanding Achievement in Psychoanalysis. He also received the Distinguished Scientific Award of the Division of Psychoanalysis, American Psychological Association, in 1993; and the Edith Seltzer Alt Distinguished Service Award from the William Alanson White Institute in 2004.

== Books (as author) ==
- Greenberg, J.R. & Mitchell, S.A. (1983) Object Relations in Psychoanalytic Theory. Cambridge, MA: Harvard University Press. ISBN 978-0674629752
- Greenberg, J. (1991) Oedipus and Beyond: A Clinical Theory. Cambridge, MA: Harvard University Press. ISBN 978-0674630918

== Selected articles and book chapters ==
- Greenberg, J. (1986). Theoretical models and the analyst's neutrality. Contemporary Psychoanalysis 22:87-106. Also in: S. Mitchell & L. Aron (eds.) Relational psychoanalysis: the emergence of a tradition. Hillsdale, NJ: The Analytic Press, pp. 150–152.
- Greenberg, J. (1999). Analytic authority and analytic restraint. Contemporary Psychoanalysis 35:25-41.
- Greenberg, J. (2001). The analyst's participation: A new look. Journal of the American Psychoanalytic Association 49:359-381.
- Greenberg, J. (2005). Conflict in the middle voice. Psychoanalytic Quarterly 74:105-120. Also in: A.M. Cooper (ed.) Psychoanalysis in America. Washington, D.C.: American Psychiatric Publishing, pp. 221–237, 2006. Also published as Conflicto en la voz media, Revista de la Sociedad Argentina de Psicoanalisis 14:123-137 (2010).
- Greenberg, J. (2008). Choice. Journal of the American Psychoanalytic Association 56:691-707.
- Greenberg, J. (2011a). Psychoanalysis in North America after Freud. In G.O. Gabbard, B.E. Litowitz & P. Williams (eds.) Textbook of Psychoanalysis. 2nd ed. pp. 19–35.
- Greenberg, J. (2011b). Theories of therapeutic action and their clinical implications. In G.O. Gabbard, B.E. Litowitz & P. Williams (eds.) Textbook of Psychoanalysis. 2nd ed. pp. 269–282.
- Greenberg, J. (2012). Conversations with Oedipus. Trends in Psychiatry and Psychotherapy 34(2):51-61.
- Greenberg, J. (2014). What daimon made you do it? Thoughts on desire in the consulting room. Rivista di Psicoanalisi 60(1):5-22.
- Greenberg, J. (2015). Therapeutic action and the analyst's responsibility. Journal of the American Psychoanalytic Association 63:15-32.
