= Henry Zvi Lothane =

American psychiatrist (1934–2026)

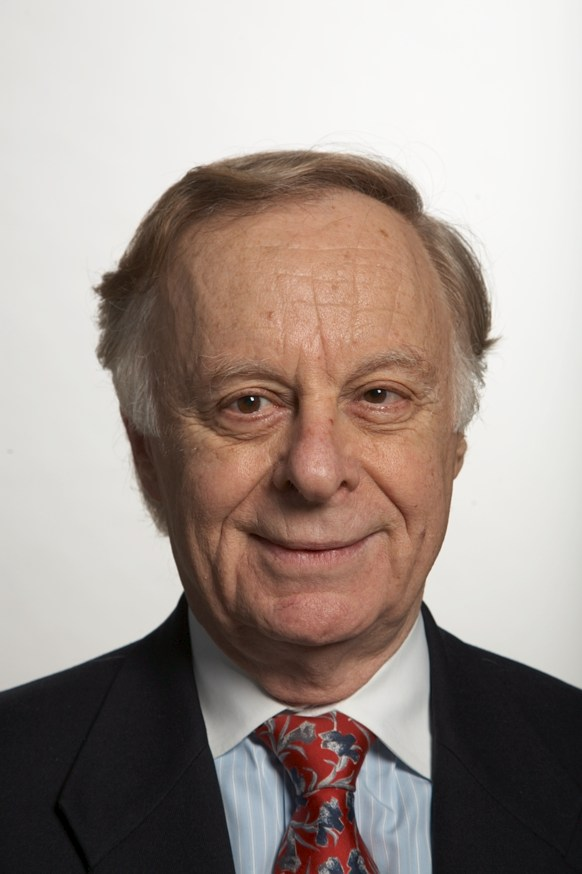
Henry Zvi Lothane

Henry Zvi Lothane (May 21, 1934 – July 22, 2026) was a Polish-born American psychiatrist, psychoanalyst, educator and author. He was Clinical Professor at Icahn School of Medicine at Mount Sinai, New York City, specializing in the area of psychotherapy. Lothane was the author of some eighty scholarly articles and reviews on various topics in psychiatry, psychoanalysis and the history of psychotherapy, as well as the author of a book on the famous Schreber case, entitled In Defense of Schreber: Soul Murder and Psychiatry. In Defense of Schreber examines the life and work of Daniel Paul Schreber against the background of 19th and early 20th century psychiatry and psychoanalysis.

== Life and work ==
Lothane was born in Lublin, Poland on May 21, 1934, to a Jewish family. With the division of Poland between the Germans and the Soviets in 1939, the family fled to eastern Poland, then under Russian control, where they lived from 1939 to 1941. Shortly before the German invasion of Russia in 1941, Lothane’s father volunteered to emigrate to Russia and thus saved the family from annihilation. In 1946, Lothane’s family returned to Lublin, where he attended elementary school. He later attended high school in Lodz until 1950, when the family immigrated to Israel. Lothane graduated from Ohel Shem high school, in Ramat Gan, Israel. Having demonstrated a gift for languages, Lothane worked as a military translator during his service in the Israel Defense Forces. After discharge, Lothane studied at the Hebrew University, Hadassah Medical School in Jerusalem, from which he graduated with an MD in 1960. After completing his internship at the Beilinson Hospital in Petach Tikwa in 1962, Lothane began his residency at the Talbieh Psychiatric Hospital, Jerusalem, headed by psychiatrist and psychoanalyst Professor Heinrich Winnick. In 1963 he emigrated with his wife and daughter to the United States and completed his residency training at the Strong Memorial Hospital, Rochester NY, chaired by Prof. John Romano. Lothane was Unit Chief at the Hillside Psychiatric Hospital, in New York, from 1963 to 1969. From 1966 to 1972, Lothane studied psychoanalysis at the New York Psychoanalytic Institute in New York City.

From 1969, Lothane was a member of the faculty at the Icahn School of Medicine at Mount Sinai, New York City, where he rose to the rank of Clinical Professor of Psychiatry. In his private practice, Lothane worked as a psychiatrist, psychotherapist and psychoanalyst. Beginning in 1994, Lothane worked for the German consulate in New York as a psychiatric expert, evaluating the restitution claims of Holocaust survivors, including those from Auschwitz (the 70th anniversary of its liberation having recently been celebrated). Lothane is a Distinguished Life Fellow of the American Psychiatric Association and a member of the American Psychoanalytical Association as well as the International Psychoanalytical Association. He was later the President of the American Society of Psychoanalytic Physicians.

Lothane's publications spanned a number of themes in psychiatry, psychoanalysis, and psychotherapy. Among the major areas in which Lothane published are (1) the history of psychoanalysis (including studies of Sigmund Freud, Carl G. Jung, Daniel Paul Schreber, Sabina Spielrein, and psychoanalysis under Nazism), (2) methodology, clinical technique and contemporary psychoanalysis, (3) love and sex, and (4) "dramatology," an approach to clinical work and technique which Lothane has developed. In many cases, Lothane’s publications bridge more than one of these themes. For example, Lothane frequently draws on his historical research with the goal of correcting misconceptions of Freud in contemporary discussions of psychoanalytic technique.

Lothane died from a cardiac arrest at his home in Manhattan, on July 22, 2026, at the age of 92.

== The Schreber Case ==
Daniel Paul Schreber was a German judge who was admitted to psychiatric hospitals three times (1884, 1893, and 1907) in his life. The second episode, during which he was declared legally insane, became the narrative of a book published in 1903, Denkwürdigkeiten eines Nervenkranken (Reflections of a Nervous Patient), published in English in 1955 under the title Memoirs of My Nervous Illness. Oddly enough, the English translation omitted the subtitle "In what circumstance can a person deemed insane be detained in an asylum against his declared will?", thereby leaving out of the title arguably the central point of the book, namely that Schreber sought to regain his liberty. Thanks to Freud's 1911 book, The Schreber Case, an analysis of Schreber's book, the latter became a staple of psychoanalytic literature, which highlighted Freud's thesis that Schreber's second episode of mental illness, especially his so-called paranoia, was caused by passive homosexual desires towards his first psychiatrist, Paul Flechsig.

The Schreber case again became famous in 1959 with the publication of the paper "Schreber: Father and Son," by the American psychoanalyst William Guglielmo Niederland. Niederland famously argued that Schreber was abused as a boy by his father Moritz by means of sadistic child-rearing practices and the use of torturing orthopedic appliances, to which, according to Niederland, Schreber referred in Chapter XI of his book. Morton Schatzman argued essentially the same thesis as Niederland in his 1973 bestseller Soul Murder: Persecution in the Family. In contrast, Han Israels' 1989 biography of the Schreber family argued that Moritz Schreber was unfairly demonized in the literature.

In that same year (1989), Lothane’s first paper on Schreber appeared, focusing on the historical record of the relationship between Schreber and his doctors. Lothane’s research was a fundamental revision of the biography and interpretation of the life and work of Daniel Paul Schreber, in part because it was based on new archival and historical research, focusing in particular on the historical gaps left by Freud and Niederland. For example, Freud’s study lacked any mention of Schreber’s mother or of Schreber’s wife, except to the extent Freud speculates about the latter’s role in protecting Schreber from being attracted to men around him. Similarly, Niederland says little about Schreber’s mother and wife, though one might expect each to be very important dramatis personae in Schreber's life-drama, especially from a psychoanalytic point of view. While Freud's and Niederland's works speculated about Schreber's fantasies concerning Flechsig, neither appears to have put much effort into finding out about Schreber's actual dealings with Flechsig, evidence of which is recorded in various archives. Lothane's Schreber research, including the book-length study, In Defense of Schreber, and some thirty articles and reviews published between 1989 and 2014, added new data and correspondingly new analyses unknown to Freud, Niederland, and other researchers, not only about Schreber himself but about the leading figures in Schreber's life. Perhaps the most original element of Lothane's approach is the respect he shows for Schreber himself, as a worthwhile thinker in his own right and as a teacher imparting important lessons to psychiatrists and psychoanalysts.

In Defense of Schreber provoked scores of reviews and reactions internationally, ranging from very positive to very negative. Richard Chessick speaks positively of the book as a correction to "innumerable historical errors": "Lothane in his painstaking historical investigation provides us with a thorough understanding of the status of psychiatry at the time, and with a knowledge of what Schreber had to put up with from his wife and various authority figures." Other reviewers were more critical, e.g., Gerd Busse about the 1992 version of the book and Ernst Falzeder about its 2004 revision. Some of Lothane's unique interpretations of the Schreber case appear in the 2011 movie Shock Head Soul, a film about the Schreber case.

== Sabina Spielrein ==
Sabina Spielrein was a Russian-Jewish physician and psychoanalyst, the second woman to join Freud's circle in Vienna. In 1904, at the age of 19, Spielrein traveled to Switzerland to study at the University of Zürich. Shortly after her arrival, Spielrein had a nervous breakdown and was admitted to the Burghölzli psychiatric hospital as a patient of director Eugen Bleuler and his deputy C. G. Jung, then 29 years old. Spielrein became a unique inmate, participating in Jung's and Franz Riklin's Word Association experiments, and matriculating as a medical student at the Zürich medical school where, in 1911, she became an MD, writing the first psychoanalytic investigation of a schizophrenic patient as her dissertation. After years of practicing as a psychoanalyst in Europe, Spielrien returned to the Soviet Union in 1923 where she taught psychoanalysis and treated both adults and children, until psychoanalysis was banned under Stalin. After the German invasion in 1942, Spielrein and her two daughters were murdered and buried in a mass grave. Spielrein's collected papers were published in Germany, the most famous of which was on destruction as a cause of becoming, a paper that inspired Freud's theory of the death instinct.

In 1906, Jung reported to Freud that he was treating an unnamed female student, a difficult case that became more difficult up to its dramatic climax in 1909. This fact went unnoticed until 1980, when Jungian analyst Aldo Carotenuto published his book A Secret Symmetry: Sabina Spielrein Between Jung and Freud (English version 1982), based upon Spielrein's German diary and letters exchanged with Jung and Freud. As a result of that book, it became widely accepted that Spielrein, as a patient, and Jung, while still her psychiatrist, engaged in a sexual affair. This would mean professional misconduct on the part of Jung along with a possible scandal and disgrace, as Jung would suspect Spielrein of spreading rumors about him. This story also implies that Jung and Freud colluded to hush up the alleged scandal.

In 1999 Lothane called attention to primary sources unknown to English authors, e.g., Spielrein's Russian-language diary and letters Spielrein wrote to her mother (which Lothane made available in English translation). These sources filled in significant and previously unknown details about Spielrein as a student and about Jung as her teacher in medical school. Lothane's analysis of the letters argued that Jung lied to Freud in saying that Spielrein was still a patient from 1906 onward. Spielrein herself informed Freud that treatment had ended in 1905 and Jung confirmed that he "treated" her free of charge. While, in letters to Freud, Jung referred to problems in his marriage and to adulterous temptations, Jung kept up the charade of treatment to cover up these real problems and Freud chose not to comment on them. Furthermore, Lothane argues, Spielrein solves the riddle of her relationship with Jung in a letter to her mother, calling her erotically colored friendship with Jung "poetry": "So far we have remained at the level of poetry that is not dangerous, and we shall remain at that level...." Whether they engaged in "dangerous" sex beyond such temptations is a fact known only to them; existing evidence, Lothane argues, does not confirm the story that they engaged in a sexual relationship.

In several articles, Lothane criticizes the literature following on Carotenuto's book, which as a rule assumes Jung's sexual misconduct and the cover-up of a public scandal. Lothane argues that, even if Jung and Spielrein had consummated sex as professor and medical student, such a situation would still be very different from psychiatric misconduct and would not, for example, be grounds for claiming damages. Spielrein's interactions with Jung, Lothane maintains, were both dramatic and at times melodramatic, inspired by the motif of the Liebestod of Wagner’s opera Tristan und Isolde, although the evidence suggests that, for Jung and Spielrein, this was metaphorical: such moods stimulated creative ideas in both and a nostalgic reminiscence for Spielrein. Spielrein wanted to marry Jung and be a mother to their child, whom she called Siegfried. For Jung she remained a muse, not a mistress. Sex or no sex, their bond was one of mutual support, friendship, and "love writ large". In English, Lothane points out, there is a difference between loving and liking, but "in other languages love refers either to (1) love writ large, called agape, caritas, philia, sympathia, or to (2) lust, i.e., libido, thus 'love' covering both love as sexual desire and sexual pleasure, and love as attachment".

Lothane's 2023 book The Untold Story of Sabina Spielrein: Healed and Haunted by Love, Unpublished Russian Diary and Letters sums up his previous research and makes important primary sources on Spielrein's life available in English for the first time.

== Psychology of love and sex ==
Starting in 1982, Lothane published a series of papers on what he termed "love writ large": i.e., love as a feeling, an emotion and an activity, and thus as the foundation of interpersonal relationships in couples and among people in larger social encounters and contexts. For Lothane, love and its antagonist hatred, manifesting as aggression in speech and violence in acts, are not merely feelings but also the most important actions, behaviors, or conducts in interpersonal relations. Love has been a neglected and poorly understood topic in psychiatric and psychoanalytic writings, according to Lothane.

This view led Lothane to highlight a significant split in Freud: (1) on the one hand, empirically, starting in 1890, first in his practicing of suggestion and later as a psychotherapist, Freud recognized the role of interpersonal love and (2) on the other hand, theoretically, in the 1905 Three Essays on the Theory of Sexuality, Freud reduced love to libido, postulating that friendship and love are derivatives of the sexual instinct. It is as a result of the latter theory that Freud has been chastised by a number of critics for lacking an interpersonal approach. For example, see "relational psychoanalysis". Lothane has argued the opposite thesis, claiming there to be an "interpersonal Freud" that has remained largely unrecognized in the psychoanalytic tradition. Whereas, Lothane maintains, Freud is monadic, i.e., focused on the intrapersonal experiences of the patient, in his theories of disorder, in his psychoanalytic method Freud is consistently dyadic, i.e., interpersonal.

In 1892, Freud composed an essay on psychotherapy (published in 1905), in which love was discussed as a component of treatment. In 1893-1895, in his epochal Studies on Hysteria, love continued to play a role in treatment, as it did in his second epochal work, The Interpretation of Dreams. Lothane elaborated on Freud’s interpersonal approaches to traumatic disorders, the role of humor in psychotherapy, and the method and technique of free association in several papers. In these texts, Lothane preferred Harry Stack Sullivan’s use of the term "interpersonal" in contrast to "relational" because, Lothane argued, one can have relations not only with persons but with objects and animals; hence "interpersonal relations" is not a redundancy but is an operational modification.

According to Lothane, it was Sandor Ferenczi, more than any of the other major figures in the psychoanalytic tradition, who contributed the most to investigating love in its breadth and in its significance for psychoanalysis. Concerning the breadth of the concept, Ferenczi understood that "love" connotes any number of positive feelings with are central to analytic practice, such empathy, sympathy, and emotionally positive interpersonal processes. These are central to the analytic process because they are central to human and social life in general. Concerning love’s significance, Lothane agrees in principle (1) with Ferenczi that love and bodily tenderness include sexuality but are not reducible to it; (2) with Michael Balint, Ferenczi’s most prominent follower, who unified primary love and psychoanalytic technique for "love, or primary love (in Balint's phrase), is the necessary leaven...the true mover of the therapeutic process that makes exploration of underlying frustration and conflict, and their eventual overcoming, possible."

== Methodology of interpersonal psychoanalysis ==
Beginning in 1982 and continuing throughout his career, Lothane published numerous studies on the clinical method of psychiatry and psychoanalysis. For example, in 1982 Lothane argued against defining hallucinations and delusions as disorders of perception rather than as phenomena associated with dreaming, daydreaming, and fantasy (as Eugen Bleuler argued against Emil Kraepelin and Karl Jaspers). Much of Lothane’s methodological work attempts to clarify the nature of free association and its foundational role in clinical psychoanalysis. From early on, Lothane used concepts of technique elaborated by two of Freud’s direct followers: Theodor Reik's "listening with the third ear" and Otto Isakower’s "analyzing instrument," which Lothane renamed "reciprocal free association," in order to underscore its operational rather than metaphorical status. Continuing the work of his predecessors, in referring to free association as "reciprocal," Lothane seeks to emphasize that: (1) it is not only the analysand but also the analyst who free associates in the clinical situation; (2) there is an interpersonal dynamic between analysand and analyst, such that the material which emerges from the associations of one evoke associations in the other and vice versa, through a reciprocal and interpersonal process. This idea goes back to Freud’s 1895 chapter on the psychotherapy of hysteria, his cases in Studies on Hysteria and its definition for the patient in The Interpretation of Dreams. Freud supplements these ideas for both patient and doctor in his 1912-1915 papers on technique.

Some similarity to Lothane’s ideas may be found in psychoanalyst Thomas Ogden’s concept of the "analytic third" and in Jungian August Cwik’s notion of "associative dreaming," though Lothane’s concept seems to emphasize the dynamic between the participants more than either Ogden or Cwik.

Lothane retains his explicit roots in Freud and in the classical psychoanalytic tradition while simultaneously emphasizing the interpersonal character of life and of the clinical situation, in contrast to many contemporary relational psychoanalysts. This is possible because Lothane sees many more interpersonal elements in the classical psychoanalytic tradition than relational psychoanalysts tend to. Lothane argues that contemporary relational psychoanalytic theorists have tended to overlook the expressly interpersonal dimensions of Freud. From Lothane’s interpersonal perspective, it is both language and speech acts as well as love and actions of love that are the overarching phenomena in the dramas of life, disorder, and therapy. Consideration of these factors led Lothane to develop his concept of "Dramatology".

== Dramatology ==
Lothane introduced the notion of dramatology as a way of conceptualizing and illustrating both human interaction in general and the nature of therapeutic interaction in particular. "Dramatology," a term not yet in standard dictionaries, is different from dramaturgy, the art of dramatic composition and its representation on stage or in film. Dramatology shares goals and values with the theory of dramatism proposed by the literary critic Kenneth Burke. However, dramatology differs from dramatism since it represents a new paradigm for psychotherapy in particular and human interaction in general. Lothane coined the term "dramatology" as a contrast and complement to the already existing term "narratology," i.e. the study conceptualization of human interactions in terms of narration or storytelling.

Dramas are events that occur "here and now," whereas stories are created after the events and always in some measure to serve the personal, historical, cultural or political needs of the narrator(s) in question. Lothane notes that, traditionally, psychoanalysis saw its material primarily in narratives of a remembered past, told to the therapist. In contrast, Lothane argues that, while the stories are about the past, the act of telling the story to the therapist is an event in the here and now, thus a current communication, listened to by the therapist as in any everyday conversation. When the listening is augmented by reciprocal free association, the process encompasses not only the conscious content but also taps into its unconscious connections and ramifications to yield a remembrance of things past that is both more complete and insightful. The process of free association is then linked to the function of imagination as a process that is based on the spontaneous emergence of mental images, which also plays an essential role in communication. In Lothane’s words, "I propose the term ‘dramatology’ ... as a paradigm that refers to (1) dramatization in thought: images and scenes lived in dreams and fantasies, and (2) dramatization in act: in dialogues and non-verbal communications such as facial expressions and gestures between dramatis personae involved in plots of love and hate, faithfulness and betrayal, ambition and failure, triumph and defeat, fear and panic, despair and hope". Lothane refers to this as "language action" rather than "action language," as Bromberg emphasizes in an article on technique in relational analysis.

Thus dramatology completes narratology. The patient and the therapist alternate in their role of speaker and listener and in the processes of reciprocal free association, continually evoking images, which coalesce into acts of interpretation and confrontation, which in turn create insight. In real life, the person who comes to a psychiatrist or psychoanalyst presents as a unique individual in physical appearance, clothing, caste and cultural identity and who communicates in an individual style through words and emotion, tone of voice, posture and gesture of face, body, and limbs, and more. The story the person tells, different from a story written, is in itself the beginning of an ongoing dramatic relationship. If all the person’s behaviors are translated by the psychiatrist into symptoms, syndromes, and systems, and molded into diagnoses, e.g., of a Kraepelinian or a Jaspersian orientation, the result may be that the individual’s uniqueness is lost in the process of abstraction and generalization. The psychoanalyst, in addition to the above, may formulate the person’s individual behaviors as the dynamics of transference, rather than the unfolding of a personal and interpersonal drama.

While dramatology-inspired interpersonal drama therapy respects the importance of diagnoses and interpretive dynamic formulas in scientific discourse and elsewhere, it strives to make contact with the living reality of the person in the therapeutic encounter beyond diagnostic labels and formulaic interpretations, using participant observation (Harry Stack Sullivan), empathy, reciprocal free association, and confrontation as some of its basic tools. In the process of interpersonal drama therapy the so-called symptoms of disorder are translated back to events in the patient’s life story, of which these symptoms are the manifest derivative forms.

In 2011, Duncan Reyburn referred to dramatology, in connection with the philosophy of G. K. Chesterton, as a "dramaturgical" hermeneutic approach that is rooted in a "dramatic understanding of the nature of being".

== Mass psychology and Nazism ==
Freud made history with his 1921 essay on mass psychology (lost in the English translation as group psychology) in highlighting the interpersonal dynamics between a leader and the masses led by him. Citing Le Bon ("the individual forming part of a crowd acquires a sentiment of invincible power, the sentiment of responsibility disappears entirely by contagion, [he is] a creature acting by instinct [with] the violence, ferocity, enthusiasm and heroism of primitive beings"), to which Freud added: "in the group the individual throws off the repressions of his unconscious impulses, all that is evil in the human mind, a disappearance of conscience, a sense of omnipotence [for] love relationships (or, to use a more neutral expression, emotional ties) also constitute the essence of the mass mind; the head — Christ, the Commander-in-Chief — loves all with an equal love as a kind of elder brother, as their substitute father, the similarity with the family is invoked; the individual gives up his ego ideal and substitutes for it the group ideal as embodied in the leader the need for a strong chief."

The mainstream analyses of the Nazi phenomenon have primarily targeted Adolf Hitler’s person, character and biography and only to a limited degree the character of the masses that followed him and the interaction between Hitler and the masses. In contrast, Lothane studied the mass psychology of Nazism by linking ideas from Freud to Wilhelm Reich's 1933 Mass Psychology of Fascism to illuminate the rise of Nazi tyranny, the persecution of German-Jewish doctors, psychiatrists and psychoanalysts, and the Holocaust.

== Honors ==
- 1991, The Nancy Roeske Certificate of Excellence for Teaching of Medical Students, by the American Psychiatric Association
- 1993, Authors’ Recognition Award, Postgraduate Center for Mental Health, 1993, for the book In Defense of Schreber: Soul Murder and Psychiatry, 1992
- 1997-98, President, New York City Chapter, American Society of Psychoanalytic Physicians
- 1999, Sigmund Freud Award Lecturer, American Society of Psychoanalytic Physicians, New York City, October 23, 1999
- 2001, Distinguished Life Fellow of the American Psychiatric Association
- 2011, Thomas S. Szasz Award for outstanding contributions to the cause of civil liberties

He was also the President, Union of Concerned Psychoanalysts and Psychotherapists. Lothane was a Member of International Psychoanalytical Association, and an Honorary Member, Polish Psychiatric Association

From 1985-2004, he was the Science Editor of the Psychoanalytic Review; from 2005 he was on the Editorial Board of the Journal of Social Distress and the Homeless, from 2000 on the Editorial Board, of the International Forum of Psychoanalysis; from 2005, Corresponding editor of the European Journal of Psychoanalysis
