= Rioch =

Rioch may refer to:

- Ríoch, 5th-century Irish missionary and saint
- Bruce Rioch born 1947), Scottish is a football manager and former player
- David Rioch (1900–1985), American psychiatrist and neuroanatomist
- Gregor Rioch (born 1975), English former footballer
- Neil Rioch (born 1951), English former professional footballer
- Margaret Rioch (1907–1996), American psychotherapist
