= Relational psychoanalysis =

Psychoanlytic school

Relational psychoanalysis is a school of psychoanalysis in the United States that emphasizes the role of real and imagined relationships with others in mental disorder and psychotherapy. 'Relational psychoanalysis is a relatively new and evolving school of psychoanalytic thought considered by its founders to represent a "paradigm shift" in psychoanalysis'.

Relational psychoanalysis began in the 1980s as an attempt to integrate interpersonal psychoanalysis's emphasis on the detailed exploration of interpersonal interactions with British object relations theory's ideas about the psychological importance of internalized relationships with other people. Relationalists argue that personality emerges from the matrix of early formative relationships with parents and other figures. Philosophically, relational psychoanalysis is closely allied with social constructionism.

== Drives versus relationships ==
An important difference between relational theory and traditional psychoanalytic thought is in its theory of motivation, which would 'assign primary importance to real interpersonal relations, rather than to instinctual drives'. Freudian theory, with a few exceptions, proposes that human beings are motivated by sexual and aggressive drives. These drives are biologically rooted and innate. They are ultimately not shaped by experience.

Relationalists, on the other hand, argue that the primary motivation of the psyche is to be in relationships with others. As a consequence early relationships, usually with primary caregivers, shape one's expectations about the way in which one's needs are met. Therefore, desires and urges cannot be separated from the relational contexts in which they arise; motivation is then seen as being determined by the systemic interaction of a person and their relational world. Individuals attempt to re-create these early learned relationships in ongoing relationships that may have little or nothing to do with those early relationships. This re-creation of relational patterns serves to satisfy the individuals' needs in a way that conforms with what they learned as infants. This re-creation is called an enactment.

== Techniques ==
When treating patients, relational psychoanalysts stress a mixture of waiting and authentic spontaneity. Some relationally oriented psychoanalysts eschew the traditional Freudian emphasis on interpretation and free association, instead emphasizing the importance of creating a lively, genuine relationship with the patient. However, many others place a great deal of importance on the Winnicottian concept of "holding" and are far more restrained in their approach, generally giving weight to well formulated interpretations made at what seems to be the proper time. Overall, relational analysts feel that psychotherapy works best when the therapist focuses on establishing a healing relationship with the patient, in addition to focusing on facilitating insight. They believe that in doing so, therapists break patients out of the repetitive patterns of relating to others that they believe maintain psychopathology. Noteworthy too is 'the emphasis relational psychoanalysis places on the mutual construction of meaning in the analytic relationship'.

== Authors ==
Stephen A. Mitchell has been described as the "most influential relational psychoanalyst". His 1983 book, co-written with Jay Greenberg and called Object Relations in Psychoanalytic Theory is considered to be the first major work of relational psychoanalysis. Prior work especially by Sabina Spielrein in the 1910s to 1930s is often cited, particularly by Adrienne Harris and others who connect feminism with the field, but as part of the prior Freud/Jung/Spielrein tradition.

Other important relational authors include Neil Altman, Lewis Aron, Jonathan Slavin, Hugo Bleichmar, Philip Bromberg, Nancy Chodorow, Susan Coates, Jody Davies, Emmanuel Ghent, Adrienne Harris, Irwin Hirsch, Irwin Z. Hoffman, Karen Maroda, Stuart Pizer, Owen Renik, Ramón Riera, Daniel Schechter, Joyce Slochower, Martha Stark, Ruth Stein, Donnel Stern, Robert Stolorow, Jeremy D. Safran and Jessica Benjamin - the latter pursuing the 'goal of creating a genuinely feminist and philosophically informed relational psychoanalysis'. A significant historian and philosophical contributor is Philip Cushman.

== Criticisms ==
Psychoanalyst and philosopher Jon Mills has offered a number of substantial criticisms of the relational movement. Mills evidently thinks this "paradigm shift" to relational psychoanalysis is not exclusively due to theoretical differences with classical psychoanalysis but also arises from a certain group mentality and set of interests: "Relational psychoanalysis is an American phenomenon, with a politically powerful and advantageous group of members advocating for conceptual and technical reform" from a professional psychologist group perspective: "most identified relational analysts are psychologists, as are the founding professionals associated with initiating the relational movement".

From a theoretical perspective, Mills appears to doubt that relational psychoanalysis is as radically new as it is touted to be. In its emphasis on the developmental importance of other people, according to Mills, "relational theory is merely stating the obvious" - picking up on "a point that Freud made explicit throughout his theoretical corpus, which becomes further emphasized more significantly by early object relations therapists through to contemporary self psychologists." Mills also criticizes the diminishing or even the loss of the significance of the unconscious in relational psychoanalysis, a point he brings up in various parts of his book Conundrums.

Psychoanalyst and historian Henry Zvi Lothane has also criticized some of the central ideas of relational psychoanalysis, from both historical and psychoanalytic perspectives. Historically, Lothane believes relational theorists overstate the non-relational aspects of Freud as well as ignore its relational aspects. Lothane maintains that, though Freud's theory of disorder is "monadic," i.e. focused more or less exclusively on the individual, Freud's psychoanalytic method and theory of clinical practice is consistently dyadic or relational. From a theoretical perspective, Lothane has criticized the term "relational" in favor of Harry Stack Sullivan's term "interpersonal". Lothane developed his concepts of "reciprocal free association" as well as "dramatology" as ways of understanding the interpersonal or relational dimension of psychoanalysis.

Adopting a more sympathetic line of criticism, Robin S. Brown suggests that while relational thinking has done much to challenge psychoanalytic dogmatism, excessively emphasizing the formative role of social relations can culminate in its own form of authoritarianism. Brown contends that the relational shift has insufficiently addressed the role of first principles, and that this tendency might be challenged by engaging analytical psychology.

== See also ==
- Relational disorder (proposed DSM-5 new diagnosis)
