= Robin S. Brown =

American psychoanalyst and academic

- Organization(s): Teachers College, Columbia University
- Known for: Relational psychoanalysis, Analytical psychology, Transpersonal psychology
- Website: www.robinbrownphd.com

Robin S. Brown is a psychoanalyst and academic. His work has been associated with a “philosophical turn” in psychoanalysis, and has received interdisciplinary attention in the fields of psychoanalysis, analytical psychology, and transpersonal psychology. He is the recipient of an award from the American Board and Academy of Psychoanalysis for his book, Psychoanalysis Beyond the End of Metaphysics: Thinking Towards the Post-Relational (Routledge). Joseph Cambray, president of the International Association of Analytical Psychology, described the book as: "A powerful, incisive critical analysis of the state of contemporary psychoanalysis"; while Lewis Aron referred to the book as "a penetrating and sophisticated critique"

== Selected publications ==
- Brown, R.S. & Saban M. [eds.] (2026) The Relational Jung: Challenging the Inward Orientation of Analytical Psychology. London & New York: Routledge.
- Brown, M. & Brown, R.S. [eds.] (2021). Emancipatory Perspective on Madness: Psychological, Social, and Spiritual Dimensions. London & New York: Routledge.
- Brown, R.S. (2020). Groundwork for a Transpersonal Psychoanalysis: Spirituality, Relationship, and Participation. Abingdon, UK; New York: Routledge.
- Brown, R. S. (2018). Imaginal action: Towards a jungian conception of enactment, and an extraverted counterpart to active imagination. Journal of Analytical Psychology, 63(2), 186–206.
- Brown, R.S. (2017). Bridging Worlds: Participatory Thinking in Jungian Context. The Journal of Analytical Psychology, 62.2, 187–207.
- Brown, R.S. [ed.] (2017). Re-Encountering Jung: Analytical Psychology and Contemporary Psychoanalysis. Abingdon, UK; New York: Routledge.
- Brown, R.S. (2016). Psychoanalysis Beyond the End of Metaphysics: Thinking Towards the Post-Relational. Abingdon, UK; New York: Routledge.
- Brown, R.S. (2016). Spirituality and the Challenge of Clinical Pluralism: Participatory Thinking in Psychotherapeutic Context. Spirituality in Clinical Practice [APA], 3.3, 187–195.
- Brown, R.S. (2015). An Opening: Trauma and Transcendence. Psychosis: Psychological, Social and Integrative Approaches, 7.1, 72–80.
- Brown, R.S. (2014). Evolving Attitudes. International Journal of Jungian Studies, 6.3, 243–253.
- Brown, R.S. (2013). Beyond the Evolutionary Paradigm in Consciousness Studies. Journal of Transpersonal Psychology, 45.2, 159–171.
