= Thompson's psychology of women =

Clara Thompson was an important figure in the revisionist “cultural school” of psychoanalysis in the 1940s and 1950s, though today she is less well remembered than her culturalist colleagues Karen Horney, Harry Stack Sullivan and Erich Fromm. Thompson herself had no pretensions to theoretical innovation but primarily was seen as a very capable teacher, clinician and organizational leader.

In Clara Thompson’s opinion one of the weakest links in the Freudian thinking has been the explanation of the psychology of women. She can be seen as one of the feminists who were against the penis envy theory explained by Sigmund Freud. In her view it has been shown that cultural factors can explain the tendency of women feeling inferior about their sex. Thus one can say that the "penis envy" is a symbolic representation of the attitude of the women in this culture.

She presented an outline about the main facts towards the psychology of women in 1953 and discussed the way culture and society have a discriminating and suppressing effect on women. In discussing woman's biological differences from man, she indicated the general ways in which society frustrates or distorts these basic drives. Not denying the necessity of female passive mindset, Thompson argued society has had a greater impact on female passivity than biological influences. She thought that patriarchal society utilizes these differences as a basis for establishing the male as superior, and the female as inferior. She did not share the opinion of Freud that women are doomed to less sexual satisfaction than men. In her opinion it is the liabilities in the society that limit women from having strong sexual needs.

An important point of discussion in Thompson's psychology of women is the problems women face when they must choose between being a home mother or a career woman without marriage. Married women with children feel themselves as not fully using their capacities and also often seek psychoanalytic help for the restless loneliness they feel. According to Thompson, this indicates that finding a balance is very difficult for women. Women have the desire for permanency and this can cause a conflict: on the one hand women are, like men, indoctrinated with the ideas of success and on the other hand they hope to get married and have children. Clara Thompson wanted to stress that all societies make some distinction between men and women roles but that these distinctions may have little to do with biological evolution.
