= Leston =

Leston is both a surname and a given name. Notable people with the name include:

== Surname ==
- Dennis Leston (1917–1981), English entomologist
- Les Leston (1920–2012), British racing driver

== Given name ==
- Leston Havens (1924–2011), American psychiatrist, psychotherapist and medical educator
- Leston Júnior (born 1978), Brazilian football manager
- Leston Paul (born 1990), Trinidad and Tobago footballer
