= Philip Bromberg =

American psychologist and psychoanalyst (1931–2020)

- Born: 1931
- Died: 18 May 2020 (aged 89–90)
- Known for: Theory of Self-States
- Scientific career
- Fields: Clinical Psychoanalysis

Philip M. Bromberg (1931 – 18 May 2020) was an American psychologist and psychoanalyst who was actively involved in the training of mental health professionals throughout the United States.

He was a supervising psychoanalyst, supervisor of psychotherapy, and member of the teaching faculty at William Alanson White Institute; a clinical assistant professor of psychology at Cornell University Medical College; assistant attending psychologist at New York Hospital-Payne Whitney Clinic; and a member of the teaching and supervisory faculty at the Institute for Contemporary Psychoanalysis.

== Life ==
=== Education ===
In 1953, he earned his bachelor's degree at New York University. In obtained his master's degree in 1961 at The New School for Social Research. He earned his doctorate at New York University in 1967.

== Work ==
Bromberg was a Training and Supervising Analyst at the William Alanson White Institute and Adjunct Clinical Professor of Psychology at the New York University Postdoctoral Program in Psychotherapy and Psychoanalysis. He was a Fellow of the American Psychological Association and ABPP Diplomate in Clinical Psychology. He was Co-editor Emeritus of Contemporary Psychoanalysis, and was on the editorial boards of Psychoanalytic Dialogues and Psychoanalytic Inquiry.

Bromberg was most widely known as the author of Standing in the Spaces: Essays on Clinical Process, Trauma, and Dissociation (1998), Awakening the Dreamer: Clinical Journeys (2006), and The Shadow of the Tsunami: and the Growth of the Relational Mind (2011).

For over 40 years he wrote extensively concerning human mental development and the patient/therapist relationship, and presented an interpersonal/relational point of view that emphasizes self-organization, states of consciousness, dissociation, and multiple self-states.

=== Multiple self-states ===
Within the context of self-organization of systems theory, Bromberg highlighted the role of developmental trauma in shame-based dissociative processes and its impact on relatedness. He also developed the vernacular for the multiplicity of self-states to describe these processes.

== Publications ==
=== Monographs ===
- Bromberg, P.M. (1998). Standing in the spaces: Essays on clinical process, trauma, and dissociation. New Jersey: Analytic Press.
- Bromberg, P.M. (2006). Awakening the dreamer: Clinical journeys. New Jersey: Analytic Press.
- Bromberg, P.M. (2011). The shadow of the tsunami: and the growth of the relational mind. New York: Routledge.

=== Edited volumes ===
- Caligor, L., Bromberg, P.M., & Meltzer, J.D., eds. (1984). Clinical perspectives on the supervision of psychoanalysis and psychotherapy. New York: Plenum Press.
- Cooper, A.M., ed. (2006). Contemporary psychoanalysis in America: Leading analysts present their work. Virginia: American Psychiatric Publishing.
- Dell, P.F. & O’Neil, J., eds. (2009). Dissociation and the dissociative disorders: DSM-V and beyond. New York: Routledge.
- Jurist, E., Slade, A. & Bergner, S., eds. (2008). Mind to mind: Infant research, neuroscience, and psychoanalysis. New York: Other Press.
- Lionells, M., Fiscalini, J., Mann, C.H., & Stern, D.B., eds. (1995). Handbook of interpersonal psychoanalysis. New Jersey: Analytic Press.
- Petrucelli, J. & Stuart, C., eds. (2001). Hungers and compulsions: The psychodynamic treatment of eating disorders and addictions. New Jersey: Jason Aronson.
- Petrucelli, J., ed. (2006). Longing: Psychoanalytic musings on desire. London: Karnac Books.
- Petrucelli, J., ed. (2010). Knowing, not-knowing and sort-of-knowing: Psychoanalysis and the experience of uncertainty. London: Karnac Books.

=== Papers ===
- Bromberg, P.M. (1974). On Psychoanalytic Training—Introduction: The Challenge of Self-Examination. Contemp. Psychoanal., 10:239-241.
- Bromberg, P.M. (1979). Interpersonal Psychoanalysis and Regression. Contemp. Psychoanal., 15:647-655.
- Bromberg, P.M. (1979). The Use of Detachment in Narcissistic and Borderline Conditions. J. Amer. Acad. Psychoanal., 7:593-600.
- Bromberg, P.M. (1979), The schizoid personality: The psychopathology of stability. In: Integrating Ego Psychology and Object Relations Theory, ed. L. Saretsky, G.D. Goldman & D.S. Milman. Iowa: Kendall/Hunt, pp. 226–242.
- Bromberg, P.M. (1980). Empathy, Anxiety and Reality—A View from the Bridge. Contemp. Psychoanal., 16:223-236.
- Bromberg, P.M. (1980). Sullivan's Concept of Consensual Validation and the Therapeutic Action of Psychoanalysis. Contemp. Psychoanal., 16:237-248.
- Bromberg, P.M. (1982). The Supervisory Process and Parallel Process in Psychoanalysis. Contemp. Psychoanal., 18:92-110.
- Bromberg, P.M. (1983). The Mirror and the Mask: On Narcissism and Psychoanalytic Growth. Contemp. Psychoanal., 19:359-387.
- Bromberg, P.M. (1984). Getting Into Oneself and out of One's Self: On Schizoid Processes. Contemp. Psychoanal., 20:439-447.
- Bromberg, P.M. (1984). The third ear. In: Clinical Perspectives on the Supervision of Psychoanalysis and Psychotherapy, ed. L. Caligor, P.M.Bromberg, & J.D. Meltzer. New York: Plenum Press, pp. 29–44.
- Bromberg, P.M. (1984). On the Occurrence of the Isakower Phenomenon in a Schizoid Disorder. Contemp. Psychoanal., 20:600-624.
- Bromberg, P.M. (1986). Discussion of "The Wishy-Washy Personality" by Arnold Goldberg. Contemp. Psychoanal., 22:374-386.
- Bromberg, P.M. (1989). Discussion of "Keeping the Analysis Alive and Creative" by Gloria Friedman. Contemp. Psychoanal., 25:337-345.
- Bromberg, P.M. (1991). Artist and Analyst. Contemp. Psychoanal., 27:289-299.
- Bromberg, P.M. (1991). Introduction to Symposium: "Reality and the Analytic Relationship." Psychoanal. Dial., 1:8-12.
- Bromberg, P.M. (1991). On Knowing One's Patient Inside Out: The Aesthetics of Unconscious Communication. Psychoanal. Dial., 1:399-422.
- Bromberg, P.M. (1991). Reply to Discussion by Enid Balint. Psychoanal. Dial., 1:431-437.
- Bromberg, P.M. (1992). The Difficult Patient or the Difficult Dyad?—Some Basic Issues. Contemp. Psychoanal., 28:495-502.
- Bromberg, P.M. (1993). Discussion of "Obsessions and/or Obsessionality: Perspectives on Psychoanalytic Treatment" by Walter E. Spear. Contemp. Psychoanal., 29:90-100.
- Bromberg, P.M. (1993). Shadow and Substance: A Relational Perspective on Clinical Process. Psychoanal. Psychol., 10:147-168.
- Bromberg, P.M. (1994). "Speak! That I May See You": Some Reflections on Dissociation, Reality, and Psychoanalytic Listening. Psychoanal. Dial., 4:517-547.
- Bromberg, P.M (1995). Introduction to David E. Schecter's "Attachment, Detachment, and Psychoanalytic Therapy." In: Pioneers of Interpersonal Psychoanalysis, eds. D. B. Stern, C. Mann, S. Kantor, & G. Schlesinger. NJ: Analytic Press, pp. 169–174.
- Bromberg, P.M. (1995). A Rose by Any Other Name: Commentary on Lerner's "Treatment Issues in a Case of Possible Multiple Personality Disorder". Psychoanal. Psychol., 12:143-149.
- Bromberg, P.M. (1995). Psychoanalysis, Dissociation, and Personality Organization Reflections on Peter Goldberg's Essay. Psychoanal. Dial., 5:511-528.
- Bromberg, P.M. (1995). Resistance, Object-usage, And Human Relatedness. Contemp. Psychoanal., 31:173.
- Bromberg, P.M. (1996). Hysteria, Dissociation, and Cure: Emmy von N Revisited. Psychoanal. Dial., 6:55-71.
- Bromberg, P.M. (1996). Standing in the Spaces: The Multiplicity Of Self And The Psychoanalytic Relationship. Contemp. Psychoanal., 32:509-535.
- Bromberg, P.M. (1997). Commentary on Lawrence Friedman's "Ferrum, Ignis, and Medicina: Return to the Crucible." J. Amer. Psychoanal. Assoc., 45:36-40.
- Bromberg, P.M. (1998). Staying the Same While Changing: Reflections on Clinical Judgment. Psychoanal. Dial., 8:225-236.
- Bromberg, P.M. (1998). Standing in the spaces: Essays on clinical process, trauma, and dissociation. New Jersey: Analytic Press.
- Bromberg, P.M. (1999). Playing with Boundaries. Contemp. Psychoanal., 35:54-66.
- Bromberg, P.M. (2000). Bringing in the Dreamer: Some Reflections On Dreamwork, Surprise, And Analytic Process*. Contemp. Psychoanal., 36:685-705.
- Bromberg, P.M. (2000). Potholes on the Royal Road: Or Is It An Abyss?*. Contemp. Psychoanal., 36:5-28.
- Bromberg, P.M. (2000). Reply to Reviews of "Standing in the Spaces: Essays on Clinical Process, Trauma, and Dissociation" (Reviewers: Marcia Cavell, Randall Sorenson, and Henry Smith). Psychoanal. Dial., 10:551-568.
- Bromberg, P.M. (2001). Hope When There Is No Hope: Discussion of Jill Scharff's Case Presentation. Psychoanal. Inq., 21:519-529.
- Bromberg, P.M. (2001). The Gorilla Did It: Some Thoughts on Dissociation, the Real, and the Really Real. Psychoanal. Dial., 11:385-404.
- Bromberg, P.M. (2001). Treating Patients with Symptoms—and Symptoms with Patience: Reflections on Shame, Dissociation, and Eating Disorders. Psychoanal. Dial., 11:891-912.
- Bromberg, P.M. (2002). Speak to Me as to Thy Thinkings: Commentary on "Interpersonal Psychoanalysis' Radical Façade" by Irwin Hirsch. J. Amer. Acad. Psychoanal., 30:605-620.
- Bromberg, P.M. (2003). On Being One's Dream: Some Reflections on Robert Bosnak's "Embodied Imagination". Contemp. Psychoanal., 39:697-710.
- Bromberg, P.M. (2003). One Need Not Be a House to Be Haunted: On Enactment, Dissociation, and the Dread of "Not-Me"—A Case Study. Psychoanal. Dial., 13:689-709.
- Bromberg, P.M. (2003). Something Wicked This Way Comes: Trauma, Dissociation, and Conflict: The Space Where Psychoanalysis, Cognitive Science, and Neuroscience Overlap. Psychoanal. Psychol., 20:558-574.
- Bromberg, P.M. (2004). More Than Meets the Eye: A Professional Autobiography. Psychoanal. Inq., 24:558-575.
- Chefetz, R.A., Bromberg, P.M. (2004). Talking with "Me" and "Not-Me": A Dialogue. Contemp. Psychoanal., 40:409-464.
- Bromberg, P.M. (2006). Awakening the dreamer: Clinical journeys. New Jersey: Analytic Press.
- Bromberg, P.M. (2006). "Ev'ry Time We Say Goodbye, I Die a Little …": Commentary on Holly Levenkron's "Love (and Hate) with the Proper Stranger". Psychoanal. Inq., 26:182-201.
- Bromberg, P.M. (2006). It never entered my mind: Some reflections on desire, dissociation, and disclosure. In: J. Petrucelli, ed. Longing: Psychoanalytic Musings on Desire. London: Karnac Books, pp. 13–23.
- Bromberg, P.M. (2007). Reply to Reviews of "Awakening the Dreamer: Clinical Journeys" by Philip M. Bromberg (Reviewers: Ethel Person, Susan Sands, and Allan Schore). Psychoanal. Dial., 17:769-787.
- Bromberg, P.M. (2007). Response to Reviews of "Awakening the Dreamer: Clinical Journeys" (Reviewers: Jessica Benjamin, Max Cavitch, and Robert Langan). Contemp. Psychoanal., 43:696-708.
- Bromberg, P.M. (2007). The Analytic Moment Doesn't Fit Analytic "Technique": Commentary on Tony Bass's "When the Frame Doesn't Fit the Picture". Psychoanal. Dial., 17:909-921.
- Bromberg, P.M. (2008). "Grown-up" Words: An Interpersonal/Relational Perspective on Unconscious Fantasy. Psychoanal. Inq., 28:131-150.
- Bromberg, P.M. (2008). Mentalize THIS!: Dissociation, enactment, and clinical process. In: E. Jurist, A. Slade, & S. Bergner, eds. Mind to Mind: Infant Research, Neuroscience, and Psychoanalysis. New York: Other Press, pp. 414–434.
- Bromberg, P.M. (2008). Shrinking the Tsunami: Affect-regulation, Dissociation, and the Shadow of the Flood. Contemp. Psychoanal., 44:329-350.
- Bromberg, P.M. (2009). Multiple self-states, the relational mind, and dissociation: A psychoanalytic perspective. In: Dissociation And The Dissociative Disorders: DSM-V And Beyond, ed. P.F. Dell & J.A. O’Neil. New York: Routledge, pp. 637–652.
- Bromberg, P.M. (2009). Discussion of Robert Grossmark's 'Case of Pamela.' Psychoanal. Dial., 19:31-38.
- Bromberg, P.M. (2009). Truth, Human Relatedness, and the Analytic Process: An Interpersonal/Relational Perspective. Internat. J. Psychoanal., 90:347-361.
- Bromberg, P. M. (2010). Minding the dissociative gap. Contemp. Psychoanal., 46:19-31.
- Bromberg, P. M. (2010). The nearness of you: Navigating selfhood, otherness, and uncertainty. In: Knowing, Not-Knowing and Sort-of-Knowing: Psychoanalysis and the Experience of Uncertainty, ed. J. Petrucelli. London: Karnac, pp. 22–45.
- Bromberg, P. M. (2010). Commentary on Carola M. Kaplan's "Navigating trauma in Joseph Conrad's 'Victory': A voyage from Sigmund Freud to Philip M. Bromberg." Psychoanal. Dial., 20:449-455.
- Bromberg, P. M. (2011). The Gill/Bromberg correspondence. Psychoanal. Dial., 21:243-252.
- Bromberg, P. M. (2011). "Afterword" to the Gill/Bromberg correspondence. Psychoanal. Dial., 21:264-267.
- Bromberg, P.M. (2011). The shadow of the tsunami: And the growth of the relational mind. New York: RoutledgeBromberg, P. M. (2012),
- Stumbling along and hanging-in: If this be technique, make the most of it! Psychoanal. Inq., 32:3-17.
- Bromberg, P. M. (2012), Credo. Psychoanal. Dial., 22: 273–278.
- Bromberg, P. M. (2013), Hidden in plain sight: Thoughts on imagination and the lived unconscious. Psychoanal. Dial., 23:1-14.
- Greif, D. & Livingston, R. H. (2013), An interview with Philip M. Bromberg, Ph.D., Contemp. Psychoanal., 49:323-355.
- Bromberg, P. M. (2014), Introduction to "WE" by Aurelia Levi. Contemp. Psychoanal., 50:298-300.
- Bromberg, P. M. (2014), Sullivan as pragmatic visionary: Operationalist and operRelationalist. Contemp. Psychoanal., 50:509-530.
