= Frieda Fromm-Reichmann Cottage =

Historic house in Maryland, United States

- U.S. National Register of Historic Places
- U.S. National Historic Landmark
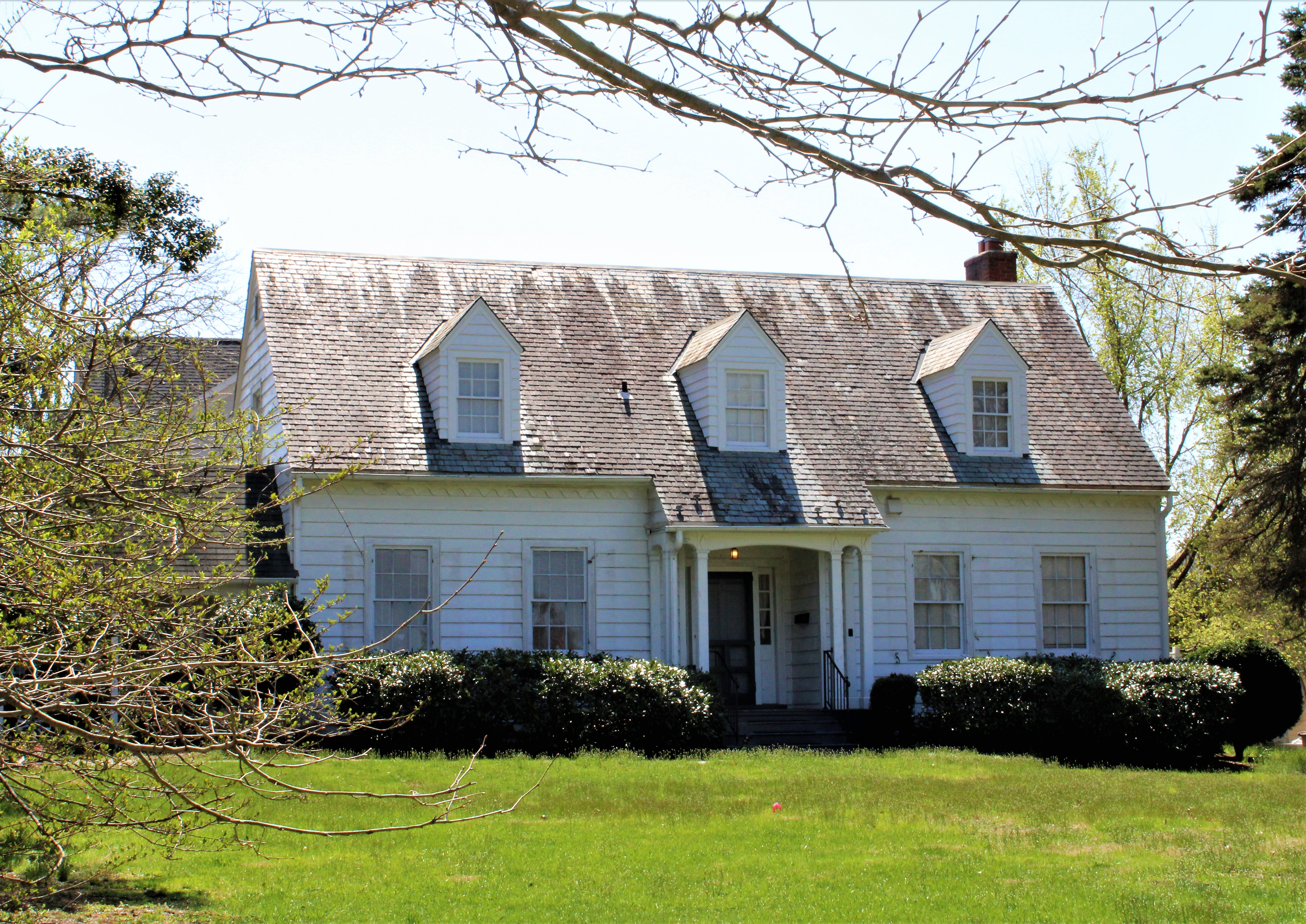

- Location within Maryland Location within the United States
- Location: 19 Thomas St. Rockville, Maryland
- Coordinates: 39°4′59.2″N 77°9′44.7″W
- Area: less than one acre
- Built: 1936
- Built by: Franklin H. Karn
- Architect: Walter G. Peter
- Architectural style: Colonial Revival
- NRHP reference No.: 100006277

Significant dates
- Added to NRHP: January 13, 2021
- Designated NHL: January 13, 2021

The Frieda Fromm-Reichmann Cottage is a historic house located at 19 Thomas Street in Rockville, Montgomery County, Maryland. It was built in 1936 to house the residence and professional office of Frieda Fromm-Reichmann, one of the leading psychoanalysts at the Chestnut Lodge psychiatric hospital, on whose grounds it stood. Fromm-Reichmann (1899-1957) was influential in the development of interpersonal psychoanalysis and its use in the treatment of schizophrenia. The cottage was designated a National Historic Landmark in 2021.

== Description and history ==
The Frieda Fromm-Reichmann Cottage stands in a park-like setting on what were formerly the grounds of Chestnut Lodge, which served as a psychiatric hospital until 1999. It stands on the eastern part of those grounds, and is now set among other suburban residential buildings. It is a modest 1 1/2-story wood-frame structure, set on a concrete foundation faced in brick, and covered by a dormered gable roof. The interior of the ground floor is arranged in a center-hall plan, with Dr. Fromm-Reichmann's office on the east side, and the dining room and kitchen on the west side.

It was built with features to serve Frieda's work "'like a narrow office near the entrance for a secretary-receptionist, and soundproof double doors on the consulting room. The cabinets on the first floor had special locks to protect their contents from unruly patients, and the front door had an extra device that could be fastened from the inside to deter unexpected 'visitors'.; Frieda saw most of her patients in her office at the cottage with 'the secretary typing away on the other side of a thin wall.'" A screened porch was later added at the back which was sometimes used for sessions on hot days. A former garage space was converted into a reception area for the doctor's patients.

Frieda Fromm-Reichmann was a German-born Jew who came to the United States in 1935. Trained in Germany as a psychiatrist by leaders in the field, she was immediately an influential presence at Chestnut Lodge, where she began working in 1936. She became a leading practitioner and educator in the techniques of interpersonal psychoanalysis, and argued that its techniques could be applied to the most significant psychiatric disorders. She remained at Chestnut Lodge in 1955, leaving for a year on sabbatical in Palo Alto, California. She returned to Chestnut Lodge in 1956, but her health declined and she died the following year.

In 2021 it was listed on the National Register of Historic Places and designated a National Historic Landmark "for its association with Dr. Frieda Fromm-Reichmann (1889–1957), a psychiatrist internationally renowned for her pioneering contribution to the treatment of schizophrenia, a serious mental illness that interferes with a person's ability to think clearly, manage emotions, make decisions, and relate to others." The cottage where she lived and saw her patients is the most prominent location associated with her productive life.
