= Frieda Fromm-Reichmann =

German psychiatrist and psychoanalyst (1889–1957)

Frieda Fromm-Reichmann (née Reichmann, German: [ˈʁaɪçman]; October 23, 1889, Karlsruhe – April 28, 1957, Rockville, Maryland) was a German psychiatrist and contemporary of Sigmund Freud who immigrated to America during World War II. She was a pioneer for women in science, specifically within psychology and the treatment of schizophrenia.

She is known for coining the now widely debunked term "schizophrenogenic mother". In 1948, she wrote "the schizophrenic is painfully distrustful and resentful of other people, due to the severe early warp and rejection he encountered in important people of his infancy and childhood, as a rule, mainly in a schizophrenogenic mother".

== Family history ==
Fromm-Reichmann was born to Adolf and Klara Reichmann in Karlsruhe, German Empire, in 1889. She was raised in a middle-class Orthodox Jewish family and was the oldest of three daughters; her sisters were Grete and Anna. She came from a large, supportive and impactful family. Her paternal great-grandfather had 93 grandchildren and her extended family played an important role in her life. Her mother was part of a group that established a preparatory school for girls in 1908 to prepare them for university because girls were not permitted to attend Gymnasium.

One of her aunts was instrumental in the establishment of kindergartens in Germany and one of her uncles, who owned the bank her father worked at, financed Frieda's college education. Her mother and father developed significant deafness, which Frieda would later develop as well. Due to the stresses of this impairment and the impending end of his career, Adolf died by suicide in 1925.

At age 36, Frieda began an affair with her patient, Erich Fromm (1900–1980), who was a student of psychoanalysis and social psychology. They met at Weißer Hirsch sanatorium where Frieda analyzed Erich as part of his training. Once they fell in love, she stopped analyzing him and they married in 1926 (one year after her father's death).

Erich developed tuberculosis, which Frieda believed was a physiological expression of psychological distress. The couple agreed that Erich would move to Switzerland to undergo specialized treatment and to live apart. However, after Erich immigrated into the United States of America in 1933, he sponsored her affidavit to flee Germany after Nazi occupation in 1934. They officially divorced in 1942. Frieda never remarried and never had biological children.

Despite having no biological children, Frieda served as a "mother" figure to her patients, friends, and family. During World War II, she financially supported more than a dozen family and friends, and advocated for their safe escape from persecution by the Nazis. Although she pleaded with her sisters and mother to also emigrate to the United States, they remained in England and Palestine. She developed deep meaningful friendships with colleagues Gertrud Jacob and Hilde Bruch, loved to play piano and listen to classical music, and dote on her beloved cocker spaniels. When Gertrud Jacob fell ill also with tuberculosis, Frieda moved with her to Santa Fe, New Mexico to seek specialized treatment. Jacob died during surgery while Frieda was back in Rockville, MD. Every summer after, Frieda spent two months at her home in Santa Fe.

She had hereditary deafness and died from a heart attack in 1957 at her home at the Chestnut Lodge in Rockville, Maryland.

Her home was designated a National Historic Landmark in 2021, in recognition of her influence in the development of interpersonal psychoanalysis in the mid-20th century.

== Educational and professional history ==
Because Adolf Reichmann had no sons, Frieda was granted privileges other Orthodox Jewish women were not allowed. Her mother, who was trained as a teacher, strongly encouraged higher education for women. Her father, who was a merchant and bank director, encouraged her to go to medical school and become a doctor. After first completing six months of "domestic science" under her mother's tutelage, Frieda attended medical school at Königsberg in 1908 as one of the first women to study medicine. She received her medical degree in 1913 and began a residency in neurology studying brain injuries with Kurt Goldstein, a neurologist and psychiatrist. During World War I she was a Major in the German Army and ran a clinic for brain-injured German soldiers. She worked under Kurt Goldstein, who was her most influential teacher and mentor. Her work led to a better understanding of the physiology and pathology of brain functions. She studied the soldiers' anxieties and panic issues and this knowledge was later applied to her work with her clients diagnosed with schizophrenia. She learned two important principles: the impact of brain trauma on healthy men and the adaptive capacity of the brain. She also studied neurology and dementia praecox.

Fromm-Reichmann continued to have an interest in psychiatry and discovered Freud's writings. Her approach to treatment emerged from her research with Kurt Goldstein. To further her psychotherapy skills, she pursued psychoanalytic training at the Berlin Institute. Her understanding of anxiety in soldiers helped her understand schizophrenia later and was the "hallmark of her life's work". She used "whatever worked with each individual" and relied "on the patients own inherent capacity for healing to guide the treatment". She also recognized the role of trauma in mental illness and started to understand the dynamics of the therapeutic relationship.

Following World War I, she worked in a sanitarium near Dresden, was a visiting physician at a psychiatric clinic in 1923, and established a small private psychoanalytic sanitarium in 1924 in Heidelberg that combined therapy with Jewish dietary rules and Sabbath observance, jokingly referred to as the "Thorapeutikum" (it later closed in 1928). She and her husband helped found the Frankfurt Chapter of the German Psychoanalytic Society and established the Psychoanalytic Training Institute of Southwestern Germany.

When Adolf Hitler rose to power in Germany and Jews began to be persecuted, Frieda moved to the Germany-France border where she rented two hotel rooms, one to sleep in and the other to see patients throughout the day. Upon immigrating to the United States, she worked as a psychiatrist at Chestnut Lodge, a mental hospital in Maryland. She was a resident psychiatrist for 22 years and spent her entire American career at the Chestnut Lodge. She focused on early life experiences that affected her patients and their ability to understand the world. Fromm-Reichmann viewed her patients as people who need help overcoming an illness. She believed a psychiatric hospital could be a therapeutic institution with individualized treatment that reflected the idiosyncratic needs of each patient.

When she fled Nazi Germany, several U.S. hospitals and institutions offered Fromm-Reichmann positions, but she was persuaded to come to Chestnut Lodge in 1936 by Dexter Bullard, its administrator, who promised to build her a home on the grounds. "Frieda's Cottage" also housed her office where she saw the majority of her patients. It was carefully restored in 2009 by Peerless Rockville, a nonprofit historic preservation organization, and was designated a National Historic Landmark on January 13, 2021. While Chestnut Lodge was lost to fire in 2009, the Lodge's open surroundings are maintained as a City of Rockville park that thus preserves the setting Frieda and her patients traveled between the cottage and the Lodge building.

During her time at the Lodge she emphasized communicating understanding in her work with individuals with schizophrenia and that psychotic communication contained meaning. She collaborated with other doctors at the Lodge to make the hospital a psychoanalytic benchmark for the treatment of psychosis. She stressed the importance of the therapist respecting the patient and continuing to try to reach them. She utilized the concepts of transference and resistance, as well as the unconscious and the importance of early childhood experiences when examining personality. She is described as one of the few notable exceptions to Freud's maxim of charging for missed appointments: "'I feel that it is not the psychiatrist's privilege to be exempt from the generally accepted custom of our culture in which one is not paid for services not rendered", she wrote in her book Principles of Intensive Psychotherapy".

Despite major successes and growing fame, Frieda's work and person were criticized by contemporaries who vehemently denied her claims that schizophrenia could be treated with psychoanalysis. An empiricist at heart, Frieda continued her work to demonstrate how the use of intuition and creativity applied to psychoanalysis could treat the most severe psychosis.

Ever the pioneer for women in science, Frieda was the first woman to be invited to the Macy Foundation in 1954. One year later, Frieda was the first woman and nonacademic member to be invited to Ford Foundation's Center for Advanced Study in the Behavioral Sciences (Palo Alto, California). Fromm-Reichmann joined Fromm, Clara Thompson, Harry Stack Sullivan, David Rioch, and Janet Rioch to found the William Alanson White Institute, a famed psychoanalytic institute in New York City. Having overcome many personal and professional adversities, Frieda Fromm-Reichmann inspired generations of psychologists and the American Academy of Psychoanalysis annual Frieda Fromm-Reichmann award.

== The "Redeemed" ==
Mrs. E was the first of a series of major breakthroughs for Frieda when applying psychoanalysis to schizophrenia, which Frieda described as "helping the doctor to ferret out whatever will to health remained buried in the illness and urging it toward the goal of cure." Once fully recovered, Mrs. E told Frieda that taking her out of the restraints by herself was the starting point of her recovery; it had the connotation for her that her doctor did not consider her to be too dangerous to emerge from her mental disorder.

Her most famous patient was Joanne Greenberg, who wrote a fictionalized autobiography of her time at the mental hospital entitled I Never Promised You a Rose Garden, which offers a very attractive portrayal of her as "Dr Fried": "She is brainy...but after you know her a while, you'll find out that with little Clara Fried, brains are only the beginning". Other famous clients include Rollo May.

== The "Unredeemed" ==
Fromm-Reichmann also treated Karl Hermann Brunck. His wife was told, "No one really knows (why he was suffering from this mental illness)... All we can say for sure about his sort of illness is that it has its roots in the failure of the parents—commonly the mother figure—to provide emotional security in infancy. This causes a weak ego organization, inability to give and receive love on an adult level." Brunck made several attempts to kill himself. His wife, Hope Hale Davis, blamed Frieda for his suicide, stating, "the most elementary routine precautions had been neglected, and Hermann had used a belt to hang himself."

Bullard alternated between patient and staff for over a decade at Chestnut Lodge, eventually referred out because of the dual role conflicts. He threatened to sue Frieda and other staff due to lack of progress, but eventually was admitted to a state hospital. Miss N. was treated from 1945 to 1955 and was recorded more than 60 times (one of the few recordings ever made of psychotherapy with a chronic schizophrenia patient). Mr. R was frequently hostile and aggressive toward her, but a "pure case" (i.e., no history of shock therapy or other somatic treatments) which presented many treatment and research possibilities.

Despite these "failures", Frieda maintained respect for the patient, rolled with resistance, and remained focused on treatment goals. She argued that even efforts to act out (e.g., masturbating during session and spitting on her) were efforts to form a deeper connection with the therapist and external world. She told students that a failed treatment might yield insights that could help the next case.

== Publications ==
Following her Jewish roots, Frieda preferred the oral tradition of the Hasidic legend, "A story must be told in such a way that it constitutes help in itself." Eventually in 1950, she published a series of her lectures assembled as Principles of Intensive Psychotherapy. The first five chapters of which are dedicated to the temperament of the therapist and countertransference by the therapist within treatment.

She published articles on Migraine, Stereotypies, and Domineering Mothers, as well as on work with psychotics. On migraine, 'Fromm-Reichmann [1937] is of the opinion that the symptom is produced when an unconscious hostile tendency is directed in particular at the destruction of an object's intelligence ("mental castration") and guilt feelings turn this tendency instead against one's own head'. With psychotics, 'Fromm-Reichmann sees in stereotypies a compromise between a tendency to express certain (tender or hostile) object impulses and the tendency to repress these impulses for fear of rebuff'. She also noted 'the increasing presence of "domineering" mothers'.

Her other works can be found here (some published posthumously):

- Fromm-Reichmann, F. (1948): Bemerkungen zur Behandlung der Schizophrenie in der psychoanalytischen Psychotherapie. Heilung durch Wiederherstellung von Vertrauen. In: P. Matussek (1976, Hg.): Psychotherapie schizophrener Psychosen. Hamburg: Hoffmann & Campe, S. 34–52
- Fromm-Reichmann, F. (1950): Principles of intensive psychotherapy. Chicago: University of Chicago Press.
- Fromm-Reichmann, F. (1959): Psychoanalysis and psychotherapy. Selected papers. Chicago: University of Chicago Press.
- Fromm-Reichmann, F. (1989): Psychoanalysis and psychosis. Madison: International Universities Press.
- Reichmann, F. (1913): Ueber Pupillenstörungen bei Dementia praecox. In: Archiv für Psychiatrie und Nervenkrankheiten 53, (1), pp. 302–321.
- Reichmann, F., K. Goldstein (1920): Über praktische und theoretische Ergebnisse aus den Erfahrungen an Hirnschussverletzten. Berlin: Springer.

== Bibliography ==
- "Principles of Intensive Psychotherapy" by Frieda Fromm-Reichmann, Publisher: University Of Chicago Press, 1960, ISBN 0-226-26599-4
- Hornstein, Gail A. (2000). To Redeem One Person Is to Redeem the World: The Life of Frieda Fromm-Reichmann. New York: Other Press.
- Berman, L. H. (1982): Frieda Fromm-Reichmann: a seminar in the history of psychiatry. I. Introduction. In: Psychiatry Interpersonal & Biological Processes 45, (2), S. 89–90.
- Bruch. H. (1982): Frieda Fromm-Reichmann: a seminar in the history of psychiatry. III. Personal reminiscences of Frieda Fromm-Reichmann. In: Psychiatry Interpersonal & Biological Processes 45, (2), S. 98–104.
- Cohen, R. A. (1982): Frieda Fromm-Reichmann: a seminar in the history of psychiatry. II. Notes on the life and work of Frieda Fromm-Reichmann. In: Psychiatry Interpersonal & Biological Processes 45, (2), S. 90–98.
- Crowley, R. M. (1982): Frieda Fromm-Reichmann: a seminar in the history of psychiatry. IV. Frieda Fromm-Reichmann: recollections of a student. In: Psychiatry Interpersonal & Biological Processes 45, (2), S. 105–106.
- Green, H. [Joanne Greenberg] (1964): I never promised you a rose garden. New York: Holt, Rinehart and Winston.
- Gunst, V. K. (1982): Frieda Fromm-Reichmann: a seminar in the history of psychiatry. V. Memoirs—professional and personal: a decade with Frieda Fromm-Reichmann. In: Psychiatry Interpersonal & Biological Processes 45, (2), S. 107–115.
- Hoff, S. G. (1982): Frieda Fromm-Reichmann: a seminar in the history of psychiatry. VI. Freida Fromm-Reichmann, the early years. In: Psychiatry Interpersonal & Biological Processes 45, (2), S. 115–121.
- Hornstein, G. A. (2000): To redeem one person is to redeem the world: The life of Frieda Fromm-Reichmann. New York: Other Press.
- Scholz, A. (2004): Ärzte und Patienten in Dresdner Naturheilsanatorien. In: medizin - bibliothek - information 4, (1), pp. 13–19.
- Stanton, A. H. (1982): Frieda Fromm-Reichmann: a seminar in the history of psychiatry. VII. Frieda Fromm-Reichmann, MD: her impact on American psychiatry. In: Psychiatry Interpersonal & Biological Processes 45, (2), S. 121–127.
