= Stephen A. Mitchell (psychologist) =

Clinical psychologist

- Born: July 23, 1946; New York City, U.S.
- Died: December 21, 2000 (aged 54); New York City, U.S.
- Known for: Relational psychoanalysis
- Spouse: Margaret Black (m. 1976)

Stephen A. Mitchell (July 23, 1946 – December 21, 2000) was an American clinical psychologist and psychoanalyst. His book with Jay Greenberg, Object Relations in Psychoanalytic Theory (1983), became a classic textbook in graduate schools and post-graduate institutions, providing a general overview and comparison of several psychoanalytic theories. He was considered a leader of relational psychoanalysis. Mitchell helped to create the Relational Track of the New York University Postdoctoral Program in Psychotherapy and Psychoanalysis.

== Biography ==
Stephen A. Mitchell was born on July 23, 1946, in Manhattan to Stanley Mitchell, an accountant, and Lilian, a legal secretary. Mitchell grew up in Ridgefield and later Bergenfield, New Jersey. His brother, Richard, was born when Stephen was five. The family was "Jewish, secular, and very involved in political and intellectual issues". Mitchell would excel at school and later go to Horace Mann High School in New York City, where his peer and future friend Thomas Ogden also studied.

Eventually, Mitchell entered Yale University and majored in an interdisciplinary honours program, "History: the Arts and Letters". He graduated summa cum laude, and subsequently trained as a clinical psychologist at the New York University doctoral program. He was trained as an analyst at the William Alanson White Institute from 1972 to 1977. His training analyst was Miltiades Zaphiropoulos.

After a first brief marriage, Mitchell married Margaret Black in 1976, who had been his internship colleague at the New York State Psychiatric Institute. Together, they raised two daughters, Caitlin (b. 1983) and Samantha (b. 1986).

Mitchell died of heart failure at his home in Manhattan on December 21, 2000. His final book, published posthumously and entitled Can Love Last?, was an application of relational theory to love relationships.

== Work ==
=== Ideas ===
Object Relations in Psychoanalytic Theory distinguished between psychoanalytic theories that emphasize biological drives such as sexuality and aggression, on the one hand, and theories that emphasize human relationships, on the other. The former were referred to as drive/conflict theories, and the latter were termed relational/conflict theories. Mitchell and Greenberg argued that drive theories and relational theories are conceptually incompatible, and psychoanalysis must therefore choose between them. After their book, the ideas of Mitchell and Greenberg diverged. While Greenberg would go on to espouse the concept of the drive, Mitchell instead chose to develop a theory of relationality through engagements with Fairbairn, Loewald, and Bowlby. Mitchell recognized the importance of Greenberg's work, while keeping a critical distance.

=== Institution ===
Mitchell also established the international psychoanalytic journal, Psychoanalytic Dialogues in 1990 and served as one of its editors for the journal's first ten years from 1990 to 2000. After the publication of his first book, with Greenberg, he was in great demand, and taught his ideas across the United States, Europe, and Israel.

In addition to his scholarly contributions, Mitchell was also involved in political and institutional questions relating to psychoanalytic training and formation. He was instrumental in developing a number of psychoanalytic organizations, including the American Psychological Association's Division of Psychoanalysis, the Relational Track of the New York University Postdoctoral Program in Psychotherapy and Psychoanalysis, and a variety of other groups.

== Bibliography ==
- Object Relations in Psychoanalytic Theory (1983), with Jay Greenberg
- Relational Concepts in Psychoanalysis: An Integration (1988)
- Hope and Dread in Psychoanalysis (1993)
- Freud and Beyond: A History of psychoanalytic thought (1996), with Margaret Black
- Influence and Autonomy in Psychoanalysis (1997)
- Relationality: From Attachment to Intersubjectivity (2000)
- Can Love Last? The Fate of Romance over Time (2001)
