= Self system =

Self-system (also referred to as self-dynamism) was a personality concept created by Harry S. Sullivan that he believed served to minimize the tension of anxiety. The self-system was defined as a unique collection of experiences that was used to describe one's own self. For the most part, Sullivan claimed that the self-system was the result of appraisals provided by caregivers during early childhood.

Sullivan considered the self-system as a major structure in personality development that could appear as early as 6 months of age. The positive reinforcement a child received during mid-infancy would not only prompt the development of the self-system, but also act as preparation for societal expectations.

== Sullivan's self-system ==
In order for the self-system to develop, Sullivan affirmed that "good me" and "bad me" personifications must first form. These personifications are organized perceptions that are account of certain experiences. The "good me" personification consists of experiences that are rewarded, which a child would sense a noticeable decrease of anxiety. The "bad me" personification on the other hand consists of experiences that are punished and cause greater anxiety to a child. These personifications then fuse into what Sullivan called the self-system.

Furthermore, Sullivan emphasized that the self-system was the product of two additional factors:

- The exploration of an infant's own body: Sullivan provided thumb sucking as an example of the exploration a child has during mid-infancy. The very act of thumb sucking would help differentiate the infant from himself or herself and others.
- The appraisals from caregivers: Sullivan believed that interpersonal relationships were vital in personality development and specifically in the formation of the self-system. Therefore, the type of appraisals a child receives will determine the kind of self-dynamism they will develop.

=== Comparison to Freudian constructs ===
The self-system revolves around the idea of perception, evaluation, and regulatory behavior. Since this concept is associated with the self, it was often compared to Sigmund Freud's ego construct. Freudian analysts were concerned about the self-system, claiming that it was equivalent to the ego. This is because like both the self-system and the ego develop during early childhood and also serve to reduce anxiety (although the ego works with the id to reduce this anxiety). Additionally, they both include some sort of protective activity, mainly to decrease anxiety. Freud developed defense mechanisms, whereas Sullivan created security operations.

In one of five lectures Sullivan gave at the White Psychiatric Foundation in 1947, he acknowledged that the self-system does have a few similarities with the psychoanalytic ego, however they are two different theoretical systems.(p. 167)

== Security operations ==
To reduce anxiety, Sullivan emphasized that the self-system must use two specific security operations, dissociation and selective inattention.

Dissociation: This security operation describes the failure to acknowledge an undesirable portion of one's personality. An event may have been so threatening, that a child feels the need to disown that particular material. Dissociation is considered unconscious and must remain that way in order to prevent abnormal behavior from occurring.

For example: A child might claim and believe that their hand was responsible for an action in order to prevent punishment.

Selective Inattention: Similar to dissociation, selective inattention is accomplished unconsciously. The self-system reduces anxiety by merely ignoring any signs of threatening events and proceeds with regular activity. A child will act like nothing happened.

For example: A mother yells at her child for throwing sand outside the sandbox. The child continues to play in the sandbox without showing any indications that he has been screamed at.

== Disadvantages ==
According to Sullivan, although the self-system serves to diminish anxiety, it is resistant to change. The self-system might get the impression that they can handle any situation, even though it rejects a situation or merely disowns it. The more the self-system encounters anxiety provoking events, the more ambitious the self-system will get. Additionally, the self-system may make a person believe that she is unique in many more ways than she really is.

Sullivan also referred to the self-system as a "microscope." When looking through a microscope for the first time, the image is blurry, therefore we must adjust the knobs to focus on the specific specimen we want to view. The self-system is the same way; it must focus much of its attention on experiences with close others, whether they resulted in reward or punishment, in order to form a clear image of ourselves. For the reason that the self-system focuses solely on experiences that resulted in pain or pleasure, it ignores what is going on outside of these experiences.

Because the self-system is derived from the appraisals a child has experienced, negative events can affect its development. Sullivan explained in his first lecture, “Basic Conceptions,” that if a child only encountered belittling events as an infant, he or she will develop a self-system that will conform with these standards. This means that a child will think low of him or her self and find fault in everything he or she does. Not only will this critical self-system affect the way a child views him or herself, but also the way they view other people.
