= Lewis Aron =

American psychoanalyst and psychotherapist (1952–2019)

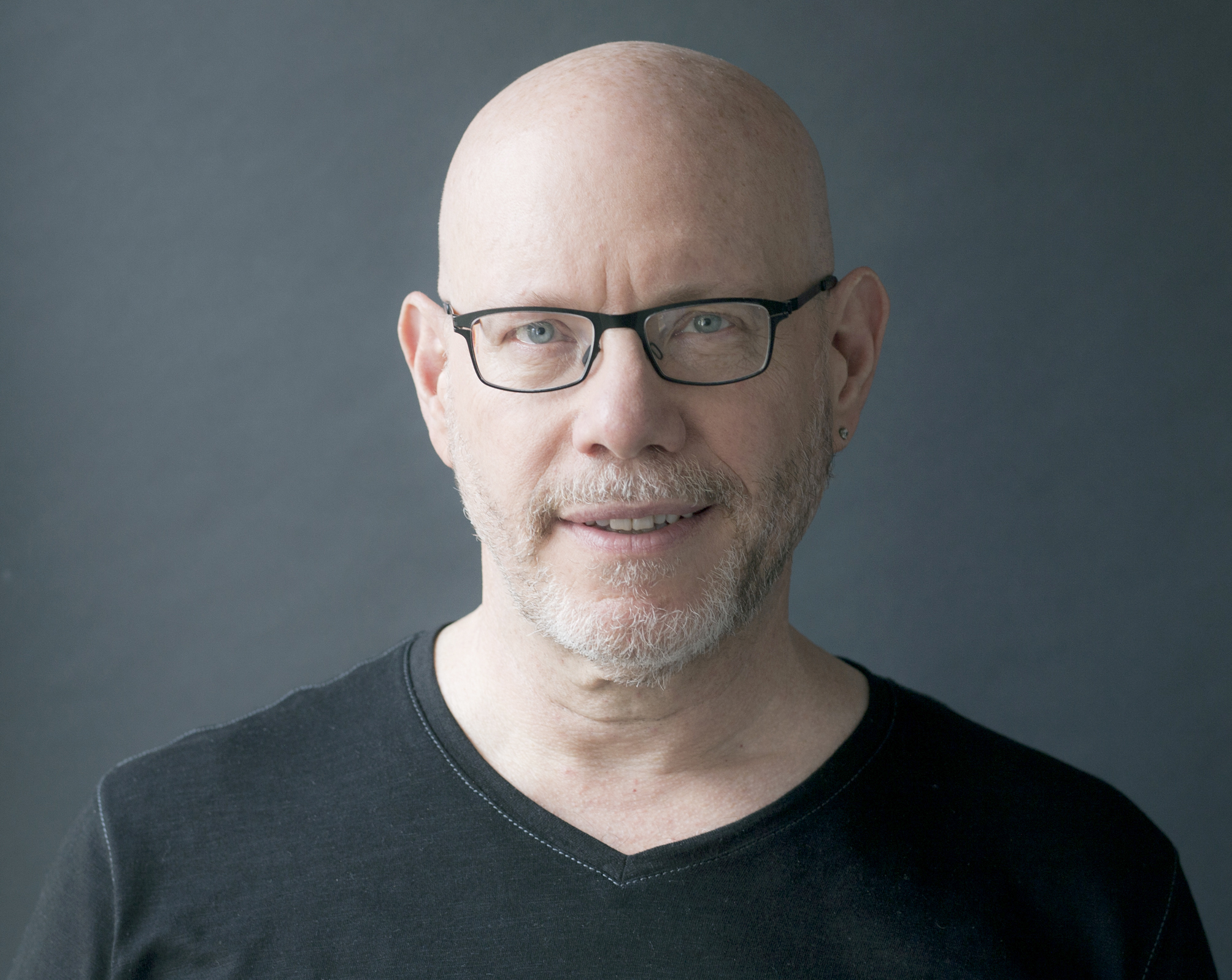
- Born: December 21, 1952
- Died: February 28, 2019 (aged 66); New York City, U.S.
- Known for: Psychotherapy and Psychoanalysis, especially Relational psychoanalysis
- Website: lewaron.com

Lewis Aron (December 21, 1952 – February 28, 2019) was an American psychoanalyst and psychotherapist, teacher and lecturer on psychotherapy and psychoanalysis who made contributions particularly within the specialty known as relational psychoanalysis. Aron was the Director of the New York University Postdoctoral Program in Psychotherapy and Psychoanalysis in New York City. He was the founding president of the International Association for Relational Psychoanalysis and Psychotherapy and was formerly President of the Division of Psychoanalysis of the American Psychological Association. He was board certified in psychoanalysis by the American Board of Professional Psychology (ABPP) and a Fellow of the American Board of Psychoanalysis (FABP). His 1996 volume A Meeting of Minds: Mutuality in Psychoanalysis and his (1999) edited volume with Stephen Mitchell, Relational Psychoanalysis: The Emergence of a Tradition are considered two of the essential texts in contemporary American psychoanalysis. Together with Adrienne Harris, he edited the Relational Perspectives Book Series, which has published many of the texts in the field. Aron was one of the founders of the journal Psychoanalytic Dialogues: The International Journal of Relational Perspectives.

== Contribution to psychoanalysis ==
The term "relational psychoanalysis" was first used by Greenberg and Mitchell in 1983 to bridge the traditions of interpersonal relations, as developed within interpersonal psychoanalysis and object relations, as developed within contemporary British theory. Due in large measure to the seminal work of Stephen Mitchell, the term "relational psychoanalysis" grew and began to accrue to itself many other influences and developments. Various tributaries—interpersonal psychoanalysis, object relations theory, self psychology, empirical infancy research, and elements of contemporary Freudian and Kleinian/Bionian thought—flow into this tradition, which understands relational configurations between self and others, both real and fantasized, as the primary subject of psychoanalytic investigation.

== Authored and edited works ==
=== Authored works ===
- Atlas, G., & Aron, L. (In press). Dramatic dialogue: Contemporary clinical practice. London: Routledge.
- Aron, L., & Starr, K. (2012). A Psychotherapy for the People: Toward a Progressive Psychoanalysis. New York, NY: Routledge.
- Aron, L. (1996), A Meeting of Minds: Mutuality in Psychoanalysis Hillsdale, NJ: The Analytic Press.

=== Edited works ===
- Aron, L., Grand, S., & Slochower, J. (Eds.) (In press). De-Idealizing relational theory: a critique from within. New York, NY: Routledge.
- Aron, L., Grand, S.. & Slochower, J. (Eds.) (In press). Decentering relational theory: a comparative critique. New York, NY: Routledge.
- Aron, L., & Henik, L. (Eds.) (2015). Answering a question with a question: Contemporary psychoanalysis and Jewish thought (Vol. II). A tradition of inquiry. Brighton, MA: Academic Studies Press.
- Aron, L., & Harris, A. (2011). Relational psychoanalysis IV: Expansion of theory. New York, NY: Routledge.
- Aron, L. & Harris, A. (2011). Relational psychoanalysis V: Evolution of process. New York, NY: Routledge.
- Aron, L., & Henik, L. (Eds.) (2010). Answering a question with a question: Contemporary psychoanalysis and Jewish thought. Hillsdale, NJ: The Analytic Press.
- Aron, L., Harris, A., & Suchet, M. (Eds) (2007). Relational psychoanalysis III: New voices. Hillsdale, NJ: The Analytic Press.
- Aron, L., & Harris, A., (Eds.) (2005). Relational psychoanalysis II: Innovation and expansion. Hillsdale, NJ: The Analytic Press.
- Mitchell, S. A., & Aron, L., (Eds.) (1999) Relational psychoanalysis: The emergence of a tradition. Hillsdale, NJ: The Analytic Press.
- Aron, L., & Anderson, F. S., (Eds.) (1998). Relational perspectives on the body. Hillsdale, NJ: The Analytic Press.
- Aron, L., & Harris, A., (Eds.) (1993). The legacy of Sandor Ferenczi. Hillsdale, NJ: The Analytic Press.
