= Parataxical Integration =

Condition of two people being reciprocally reactive to each others' certain behaviors

First used by Irish-American psychoanalytic psychiatrist Harry Stack Sullivan in the 1940s, Parataxical Integration (a combination of terms) refers to the mutual condition of parataxic distortions (another concept of Sullivan’s). Parataxical integration exists when two people, usually intimate with each other (i.e. parents and children, spouses, romantic partners, business associates), are reciprocally reactive to each other's seductions, judgmental inaccuracies, hostile comments, and manipulations or other "triggering" behaviors. One says or does something causing the other to react, setting off a cyclical "ping-pong", "tit-for-tat", "you-get-me-and-I-get-you-back" oscillation of verbal and/or behavioral reactions.

== Development ==
The concept first appeared in Sullivan's The Interpersonal Theory of Psychiatry, published in 1953. It was developed further by his protégé, Lorna Smith Benjamin, in her Interpersonal Diagnosis and Treatment of Personality Disorders (1996). Benjamin saw parataxical integration as typical in the interpersonal behavior of couples with unresolved autonomy (i.e. separation, boundary) and identity issues. Erik Erikson had himself described the unconscious, reciprocal reactivation (without using Sullivan’s terms) in his essay, "The Problem of Ego Identity," and in Identity and Anxiety, by Stein et al. (1960).

== Usage ==
Though the term itself is not used in much of the professional peer-reviewed literature, the interpersonal manifestation to which it refers appears regularly in the case study literature of the "family systems" school of psychologists, including Don D. Jackson, Jay Haley, Gregory Bateson, Virginia Satir, and Salvador Minuchin. Parataxical integrations are also presented in similar studies reported by Ronald D. Laing, Aaron Esterson, and anthropologist Jules Henry, largely during the 1950s and 1960s. Harold Searles and Charles McCormack describe manifestations of parataxical integration in their works on borderline personality disorders in the 1980s and 2000s.

Paul Watzlawick et al. describes the concept in his book, Change, noting, "... the circularity of their interaction makes it undecidable ... whether a given action is the cause or effect of an action by the other party ... either party sees its actions as determined and provoked by the other's actions ...".

Rodger Garrett also employs the concept in his millennial-era work on borderline personality disorder and family of origin etiology, typically using the term "reciprocal reactivity" along with it.

Reciprocal reactivity was studied by Gary Sperduto et al. in the 1970s, and it is clear from the abstract of his paper (see below) that his definitional terminology equated to that of Sullivan.

Numerous mass-market psychology authors, many writing about the topic of "co-dependence," including Melody Beattie, Pia Mellody, Anne Wilson Schaef, and Barry & Janae Weinhold, describe the interpersonal manifestation without using Sullivan’s term per se. Co-dependence expert Pia Mellody describes the behavioral manifestations of parataxical integration at length in an audio presentation available online.

== Sources ==
- L. S.: Interpersonal Diagnosis and Treatment of Personality Disorders, Second Edition, New York: Guilford Press, 1996.
- https://sighkoblahgrr.blogspot.com/2008/04/borderline-lovers-narcissists-drugs.html Garrett, R.: The Borderline Lover as the Narcissist’s Drug, 2008.
- Goldenberg, I.; Goldenberg, H.: Family Therapy: An Overview, Belmont, CA: Thomson Learning, 2000.
- Henry, J.: Pathways to Madness, New York: Random House, 1965.
- Jackson, D. (editor): The Etiology of Schizophrenia: Genetics / Physiology / Psychology / Sociology, New York: Basic Books, 1960.
- Laing, R. D.; Esterson, A.: Sanity, Madness and the Family, London: Tavistock, 1964.
- McCormack, C.: Treating Borderline States in Marriage: Dealing with Oppositionalism, Ruthless Aggression, and Severe Resistance, Northvale, New Jersey: Jason Aaronson, 2000.
- Mellody, P.; Miller, A. W.: Facing Codependence: What It Is, Where It Come From, How It Sabotages Our Lives, San Francisco: Harper, 1989.
- Mellody, P.; Miller, A. W.: Facing Love Addiction: Giving Yourself the Power to Change the Way You Love, San Francisco: Harper, 1992.
- Schaef, A. W.: Escape from Intimacy, New York: Harper-Collins, 1987.
- Schaef, A. W.: Co-dependence: Misunderstood, Mistreated, New York: HarperOne, 1992.
- Searles, H.: My Work with Borderline Patients, New York: Jason Aronson, 1986.
- Sperduto, G.; Calhoun, K.; Ciminero, A.: The effects of reciprocal reactivity on positively and negatively valenced, self-rated behaviors, in Journal of Behaviour Research and Therapy, Vol. 16, No. 6, 1978.
- Stein, M.; Vidich, A.; White, D. (editors): Identity and Anxiety: Survival of the Person in Mass Society, Glencoe, IL: The Free Press of Glencoe, Illinois, 1960.
- Watzlawick, P.; Weakland, J.; Fisch, R.: Change: Principles of Problem Formation and Problem Resolution, New York: W. W. Norton, 1974.
- Weinhold, B.; Weinhold, J.: Breaking Free of the Co-dependency Trap, Revised Edition, Novato, CA: New World Library, 2008.
