= Gail Hornstein =

American psychologist

Gail Hornstein is an American psychologist and author. She is a professor of psychology and education at Mount Holyoke College. She doesn't see mental disorders as merely chemical imbalances in the brain, but is more interested in the lived experiences of those suffering from various mental ailments. Her Bibliography of First-Person Narratives of Madness in English lists more than 1,000 books by people who have written about madness from their own experience; it is used by researchers, clinicians, educators, and peer groups around the world. Her 2009 book Agnes's Jacket is a history of survivors of the mental health system and their stories.

In 2017, she attracted criticism for publishing an article in the Chronicle of Higher Education in which she described why she encouraged students with emotional disabilities to develop coping skills and community support for rather than always rely on the accommodations which they are legally afforded. Further, she describes how she reaches out to support students when aware of a possible emotional crisis.

== Bibliography ==
- Agnes’s Jacket: A Psychologist’s Search for the Meanings of Madness
- To Redeem One Person is to Redeem the World: The Life of Frieda Fromm-Reichmann
