= Leston Havens =

American psychiatrist (1924–2011)

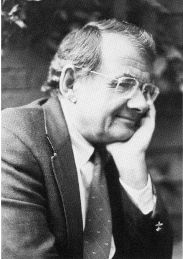
- Born: Leston Laycock Havens; 31 July 1924; New York City, New York
- Died: 29 July 2011 (aged 86); Cambridge, Massachusetts
- Education: Cornell Medical School
- Known for: Psychotherapy
- Scientific career
- Fields: Psychotherapy
- Workplaces: Harvard Medical School

Leston Laycock Havens, MD (July 31, 1924–July 29, 2011) was an American psychiatrist, psychotherapist, and professor emeritus of psychiatry at Harvard Medical School.

Dr. Havens is best known for his work on biological psychiatry, the rehabilitation of severely ill patients, and methods of interviewing patients. He was also a pioneer in the establishment of hospital psychopharmacology units.

== Early life ==
Havens was born on July 31, 1924, in Brooklyn, New York City, where he also grew up. His father was a lawyer, and Havens originally considered law as a career path before deciding on medicine. When he entered Williams College, in Williamstown, Massachusetts, he studied English and history, as well as philosophy. In 1944, during World War II, he joined the U.S. Army, serving until 1946. He was stationed on Tinian, a captured Japanese island in the Pacific, where he located and detonated abandoned ammunition. After his discharge from the military, Havens completed his B.A. magna cum laude, in 1947.

== Academic life ==
Havens went on to attend Cornell Medical School, graduating with his M.D. in 1952. He served as an intern in Internal Medicine at the New York Hospital and stayed there until 1954 as an assistant resident. Havens completed his residency from 1954 to 1958 at the Boston Psychopathic Hospital (now the Massachusetts Mental Health Center). This began a long connection with the Harvard University Medical School. In 1954, Havens was appointed as a Teaching Fellow in Psychiatry at Harvard and by 1971 was promoted to full professor status at Harvard Medical School.

While at Boston Psychopathic, Havens founded the Psychopharmacology Unit; one of the first in the country and one that would become famous. There he completed many studies on Electroconvulsive Therapy. Between 1964 and 1982 Havens directed the medical student clerkship at Boston Psychopathic.

From 1987 to 1996, Havens directed the psychiatry residency program at Cambridge Hospital, a teaching hospital of Harvard Medical School. At Cambridge, he taught psychiatrists and psychologists. He taught his students to listen and relate to their patients rather than categorize or pathologize them.

Many of his lectures and recorded sessions are stored on the archived version of the Harvard Leston Havens M.D. Teaching Site.

== Works ==
Havens authored or coauthored over 150 publications, including seven books, at first centered around psychopharmacology and then later focused more around psychotherapeutic practice and technique.

=== Making Contact ===
Making Contact: Uses of Language in Psychotherapy (1986) explores the precise application of language in the therapy room. Susan Monsky of the Boston Globe described the book as “a basic grammar of empathy.” Havens breaks down three buckets of language: empathetic language—finding the other—interpersonal language—managing distance—and performative language—liberating the patient, a concept Havens borrows from JL Austin.

The suggested language, experienced by the patient as understanding, makes contact with what are abstractly understood to be drives and internal structures. Words bring abstract understanding into relationship with experience; the persons involved become the conveyance. The process is similar to what engineering does with scientific principles. It translates them through the medium of the physical world.

=== A Safe Place ===
A Safe Place: Laying the Groundwork of Psychotherapy (1989) reviews the history of psychotherapy and psychiatry and discusses the conditions for therapeutic growth and healing.

== Awards ==
Leston Havens received many awards throughout his career.

- 1952 Cornell University Medical School: Morton prize in Internal Medicine, Samuel prize in ophthalmology, Alpha Omega Alpha
- 1958 A.E. Bennett Award, Society of Biological Psychiatry
- 1962 McCurdy Prize, Massachusetts Society for Research in Psychiatry
- 1970 Fried Lecture, Newton-Wellesley Hospital
- 1973 Who's Who in America
- 1977 H.C. Solomon Award with Thomas G. Gutheil, M.D.
- 1979 Award for Excellence in Clinical Teaching, Harvard Medical School, plus numerous nominations
- 1979 Elvin Semrad Teaching Award, Massachusetts Mental Health Center
- 1981 Valentina Donahue-Turner Award for Teaching, Harvard Medical School
- 1986 Harry Stack Sullivan Lecture, The Sheppard and Enoch Pratt Hospital
- 1986 Honorable Bernard Towson-Lectureship in Psychiatry, Cornell North Shore Hospital
- 1989 Frieda Fromm Reichman Lecturer, Washington Psychiatric Society
- 1992 Price Lecture, Trinity Church, Boston, MA
- 1995 Benjamin Rush Award and Lecture, American Psychiatric Association
- 1995 Nomination for 1995 Harvard Medical School Award for Excellence in Mentoring
- 1997 William F. Orr Lecture
- 1997 Zigmond Lebensohn Lecture
- 1998 Lee Hasenbush Lecture, MMHC
- 1998 Jacob Finesinger Lecture, University of Maryland
- 1999 Honorary Member, William Alanson White Institute, New York

== Bibliography ==
Year	Type	Role	Publication
1959	Journal	Author	"Changes in Catechol Amine Response to Successive Electric Convulsive Treatments"
1961	Journal	Author	"Plasma Epinephrine and Norepinephrine Levels During Insulin-Induced Hypoglycemia in Man"
1963	Journal	Coauthor	"The Psychopharmacology of Phenothiazine Compounds: A Comparative Study of the Effects of Chlorpromazine, Promethazine, Trifluoperazine and Perphenazine in Normal Males"
1963	Journal	Author	"The effect of competition on visual duration threshold and its independence of stimulus frequency"
1965	Journal	Author	"The Anatomy of a Suicide"
1966	Journal	Author	"Pierre Janet"
1967	Journal	Author	"Karl Jaspers and American Psychiatry"
1968	Journal	Author	"Some Difficulties in Giving Schizophrenic and Borderline Patients Medication"
1973	Book	Author	Approaches to the Mind: Movement of the Psychiatric Schools from Sects Toward Science
1974	Journal	Author	The Existential Use of the Self
1976	Book	Author	Participant Observation: Uses of Language in Psychotherapy
1978	Journal	Author	"Explorations in the Uses of Language in Psychotherapy: Simple Empathic Statements"
1979	Journal	Coauthor	"Which Short-term Therapy? Matching Patient and Method"
1979	Journal	Author	"The Therapeutic Alliance: Contemporary Meanings and Confusions"
1979	Journal	Author	"Explorations in the Uses of Language in Psychotherapy: Complex Empathic Statements"
1981	Journal	Coauthor	"The initial encounter: what to do first?"
1980	Journal	Author	"Explorations in the Uses of Language in Psychotherapy"
1986	Book	Author	Making Contact: Uses of Language in Psychotherapy
1986	Journal	Author	"A Theoretical Basis for the Concepts of Self and Authentic Self"
1989	Book	Author	A Safe Place: Laying the Groundwork of Psychotherapy
1991	Journal	Author	"Paranoid Phenomena and Pathological Narcissism"
1993	Book	Author	Coming to Life: Reflections on the Art of Psychotherapy
1994	Book	Author	Learning to Be Human
1994	Journal	Author	"Psychotherapeutic Management Techniques in the Treatment of Outpatients With Schizophrenia"
2000	Book	Coeditor	The Real World Guide to Psychotherapy Practice (coedited with Alex N. Sabo)
2001	Journal	Author	"Soundings: a psychological equivalent of medical percussion"
2004	Journal	Author	"The Best Kept Secret: How to Form an Effective Alliance"
2005	Journal	Author	"Existential despair and bipolar disorder: the therapeutic alliance as a mood stabilizer"
2007	Journal	Author	"Approaching the mind in clinical interviewing: the techniques of soundings and counterprojection"
