= William Alanson White =

American neurologist and psychiatrist (1870–1937)

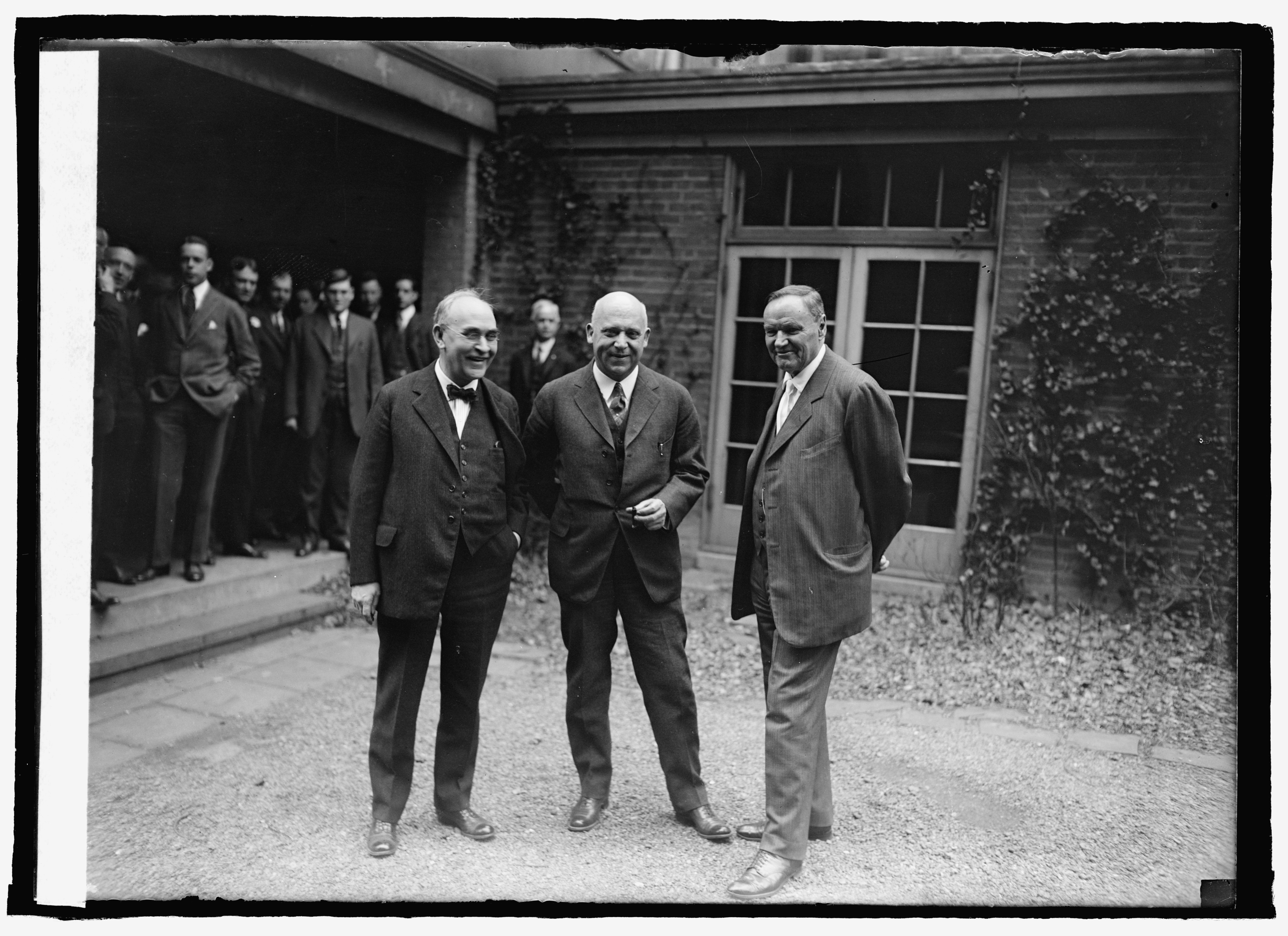
White (left)

William Alanson White (January 24, 1870 – March 7, 1937) was an American neurologist and psychiatrist.

== Early life ==
He was born in Brooklyn, New York to parents Alanson White and Harriet Augusta Hawley White. He attended public school in Brooklyn. A young White was influenced by philosopher Herbert Spencer; After White's death, one writer recalled that White "was never seriously shaken from Spencer's hopeful evolutionary catechism, which at the age of 13 he had accepted as the key to all knowledge".

At 15, White entered Cornell, studying there from 1885 to 1889. In 1891, White graduated with an M.D. from the Long Island College Hospital. After serving as an intern for a year, for nine years he was an assistant physician at the Binghamton (New York) State Hospital. There he collaborated with Boris Sidis.

== Career ==
On October 1, 1903, White became superintendent of the "Government Hospital for the Insane", later named St. Elizabeths Hospital, in Washington, D.C. There he spent the rest of his career. Also in 1903, he accepted the post of professor of nervous and mental diseases at Georgetown University, and in 1904 a similar chair at George Washington University, lecturing besides at the Army Medical School.

In 1913, White co-founded The Psychoanalytic Review. From 1915 to 1917, White was president of the American Psychoanalytical Society; he returned to role from 1927 to 1929. In 1917, the hospital was formally renamed St. Elizabeth's.

In March 1918, White married Lola Thurston, the widow of Senator John Mellen Thurston.

White was president of the American Psychopathological Society in 1922, of the American Psychiatric Association in 1924–25. He took an interest in forensic psychology, and worked for better cooperation between the American Psychiatric Association and the American Bar Association. He testified for the defense in the Leopold and Loeb trial.

In December 1922, St. Elizabeth's became the first hospital in the US to employ pyrotherapy for the treatment of late-state syphilis. White approved the use of insulin shock therapy for syphilis at St. Elizabeth's.

In 1930, St. Elizabeth's was the only mental hospital in the United States with an American Medical Association-accredited internship. St. Elizabeth's was investigated by Congress three different times: first in 1906, again in 1917-18, and finally in 1926.

In 1934, he was the main speaker at the American Association for the Advancement of Science. Papers summarized: "Man's future lays in a new understanding of the meaning of heredity and environment in the application of new scientific discoveries in physics, chemistry and biology to the fields of psychology, and in the significant way in which man's 'very highly developed self-regard functions'". He was followed by a speech by Albert Einstein.

Lola (Purman) Thurston, whom he married in 1918, and a stepdaughter survived him when he died in Washington in March 1937.

== Works ==
- Mental Mechanisms (1911)
- Outlines of Psychiatry (fifth edition, revised, 1915)
- Diseases of the Nervous System (1915) Done in collaboration with Smith Ely Jelliffe.
- The Principles of Mental Hygiene (1917)
- Thoughts of a Psychiatrist on the War and After. New York: Paul B. Hoeber, 1919
- Mechanisms of Character Formation (1920)
- Foundations of Psychiatry (1921)
- Essays in Psychopathology (1925)
- The Meaning of Disease (1926)

== Legacy ==
During White's tenure as superintendent, St. Elizabeths, which served Federal employees, military personnel, and residents of the District of Columbia, underwent significant reforms. What previously had operated as a warehouse for the insane came to provide occupational therapy and psychotherapy. White did away with straitjackets for restraint and opened a beauty parlor for the female patients. For two years in the 1920s, White opened the doors of St. Elizabeths to Alfred Korzybski, enabling Korzybski to directly study mental illness, research that contributed heavily to Korzybski's 1933 Science and Sanity: An Introduction to Non-Aristotelian Systems and General Semantics. Korzybski characterized White as "extremely brilliant, very [well] read, very creative, very human, very warm, and very much interested in the future of psychiatry altogether."

White is the namesake of the William Alanson White Institute psychoanalytic clinic in New York City.
