= Parataxic distortion =

Inclination to skew perceptions of others based on fantasy

Parataxic distortion is a psychiatric term first used by Harry S. Sullivan to describe the inclination to skew perceptions of others based on fantasy. The "distortion" is a faulty perception of others, based not on actual experience with the other individual, but on a projected fantasy personality attributed to the individual. For example, when one falls in love, an image of another person as the "perfect match" or "soul mate" can be created when in reality, the other person may not live up to these expectations or embody the imagined traits at all.

The fantasy personality is created in part from past experiences and from expectations as to how the person "should be", and is formulated in response to emotional stress. This stress can originate from the formation of a new relationship, or from cognitive dissonance required to maintain an existing relationship. Parataxic distortion serves as an immature cognitive defense mechanism against this psychological stress and is similar to transference.

Parataxic distortion is difficult to avoid because of the nature of human learning and interaction. Stereotyping of individuals based on social cues and the classification of people into groups is a commonplace cognitive function of the human mind. Such pigeonholing allows for a person to gain a quick, though possibly inaccurate, assessment of an interaction. The cognitive processes employed, however, can have a distorting effect on the clear understanding of individuals. In essence, one can lose the ability to "hear the other" through one's own projected beliefs of what the other person is saying.

== Etymology ==
From the Greek παράταξις, "placement side by side"

Para - A Greek prefix which came to designate objects or activities auxiliary to or derivative of that denoted by the base word ( parody; paronomasia, paranoia) and hence abnormal or defective.

Taxic - indicating movement towards or away from a specified stimulus.

In this sense, Parataxic distortion, is a shift in perception away from reality.

== Interpersonal relationships and emotions ==
Distorting one's perception of others can often interfere with interpersonal relationships. In many cases, however, it may be beneficial to do so. Humans are constantly and subconsciously stereotyping. According to Paul Martin Lester, "our brains naturally classify what we see, we can't help but notice the differences in physical attributes between one person and another". Parataxic distortion runs parallel to stereotyping while it remains in the subconscious. As we make quick judgments, we are drawing from previous experiences stored in our memory.

Parataxic distortion can be a beneficial defense mechanism for the individual, allowing the individual to maintain relationships with others with whom he or she would otherwise be unable to interact or allowing the individual to endure difficult periods in relationships. A self-imposed blindness to certain personality traits can keep a relationship healthy, or it can also prove destructive. For instance, parataxic distortion can keep one in denial of the abusive nature of a spouse.

== Attachment theory ==
Parataxic distortion can begin in the early stages of development in infants. A mother's nurturing personality and emotional warmth might be projected onto a lover later in life. This could initially generate stronger feelings for the woman than are warranted by her behavior and character alone. This example of attachment theory correlates with Parataxic Distortion.

Attachment theory would have it that the fantasy selves projected onto others in parataxic distortion are informed by our long-term attachment patterns. Not only are these imagined traits the resultant of our earliest bonds and unresolved emotional issues from past relationships, but they are recreated in these fantasy selves for the purpose of recreating that past attachment in the present.

== Negative effects ==
Dealing with current situations or people that relate to a past event, or remind someone of a person from the past, can have negative effects on a human from an emotional standpoint. If the person from the past was a negative figure or the past event had a negative influence on a person, the person may create a self-sense of identity for the new individual they met. The negative emotional response happens when the individual realizes that they have been creating a fake identity for the new individual.

Parataxic distortion is most effective in the realm of interpersonal communication. Parataxic distortion is typically used to avoid coping with past events. For example, if a child is mistreated by his or her father, the child may not only attach the fear and anger towards the father but will also relate this fear and anger to other men that look, talk or act like the father. The human mind keeps track of situations that we have encountered in the past to help us deal with future situations. The unconscious memory, without our knowing, helps us understand and deal with situations in the present that we have dealt with in the past. Parataxic distortion and our unconscious mind make us act the same way in current situations as we did in the past, even without realizing it.

== Defense mechanism ==
As a defense mechanism, parataxic distortion protects one from the emotional consequences of a past event. A person may not remember a certain event, or be acting on it consciously, but will act a certain way to protect themselves from an outcome with the use of parataxic distortion. This behavior is a pathological attempt to cope with reality by using unreality.

Parataxic distortion is a commonly used psychological defense mechanism. It is not an illness or a disease, but a part of everyday, normal human psychology that can become maladaptive in certain situations. The cognitive abilities used to generate internal models of others are useful in interaction. As we can never truly internalize the full reality of another, we must interact with a shorthand version of them. It's only when we believe that the shorthand version is their reality that this ability can become maladaptive. One may also attempt to coerce or force another to 'fit the mold' and act more according to expectations, more like the idealized version they dream the other as being. This is also pathological.

However, all humans engage in parataxic distortion to one extent or another, in one realm or another. It may be to manage emotions within their family, to facilitate communication between them and their spouse, or to imagine a relationship between them and their nation-state.

== See also ==
- Denial – Assertion that a statement is false
- Cognitive distortion – Exaggerated or irrational thought pattern
- Psychological projection – Attributing parts of the self to others
- Parataxical Integration – Condition of two people being reciprocally reactive to each others' certain behaviors
- Transference – Phenomenon within psychotherapy
