= Clara Thompson =

American psychiatrist and psychoanalyst

- Born: Clara Mabel Thompson; October 3, 1893; Providence, Rhode Island, U.S.
- Died: December 20, 1958 (aged 65); New York City, U.S.
- Education: Pembroke College in Brown University (B.A.); Johns Hopkins University (M.D.)
- Occupations: Psychiatrist, psychoanalyst
- Notable work: Psychoanalysis: Evolution and Development (1950)

Clara Mabel Thompson (October 3, 1893 in Providence, Rhode Island – December 20, 1958 in New York City) was a prominent psychiatrist and psychoanalyst and co-founder of the William Alanson White Institute. She published articles and books about psychoanalysis as a whole and specifically about the psychology of women.

== Education ==
Thompson graduated from the Women's College (Pembroke College in Brown University). In 1916, she went on to earn her Doctor of Medicine at Johns Hopkins University. She was initially interested in becoming a medical missionary before pursuing a career in psychoanalysis. She interned at the New York Infirmary for Women and Children, and she completed her residency in psychiatry at The Henry Phipps Psychiatric Clinic at the Johns Hopkins Hospital in 1925.

== Career ==
Thompson established a private practice and taught at Vassar College and the New York Psychoanalytic Institute. At this time she established a friendship with Harry Stack Sullivan. She studied with Sándor Ferenczi, a pupil and colleague of Freud, in Budapest. She co-founded the American Association for the Advancement of Psychoanalysis and was elected its first vice president. She published over 50 papers, articles, and reviews over the course of her career, as well as three books, including Psychoanalysis: Evolution and Development (1950).

In 1943, Thompson founded the William Alanson White Psychiatric Foundation in New York together with Erich Fromm, Harry Stack Sullivan, Frieda Fromm-Reichmann, David Rioch and Janet Rioch. She served as its executive director for many years and worked there until her death in 1958.

=== Contribution to psychoanalysis ===
Thompson's main contribution to the field of psychoanalysis consists of an extensive overview of the field. She wrote books and papers about the origin and development of psychoanalysis because her students were confused by the varied approaches of different psychoanalytic schools. In her own words, she did so because"if one stopped emphasizing differences and tried to note the general stream of development one would find that this infant science (...) has a forward moving direction to which all of the different schools have contributed". Thompson had an extensive knowledge of the field of psychoanalysis regarding both developments and the different positions and schools. In describing the different schools, Thompson took a position in the middle of the psychoanalytic spectrum; she stressed what different views could add to the field and spoke with respect about representatives of the different schools.

Thompson divided the development of psychoanalysis into four periods:

1. 1885–1900: In this period the majority of the basic ideas of psychoanalysis were born out of Freud's mind and remain at the center of some schools up till the present day.
2. 1900–1910/1920: Stressed the importance of the biological sexual development of the child.
3. 1910–1925: The focus extended itself to the entire personality.
4. 1925–present: The view on psychoanalysis expanded from internal forces only (the classic psychoanalysis) to the influences of culture and other persons on the patient and its psychoanalysis. This is also the view that Thompson herself embraced: the influence of culture and interpersonal relationship can never be discarded in psychoanalysis.

In theory and practice, she emphasized and analyzed what went on between people to facilitate the growth of a human relationship. She believed in the value of psychoanalysis for enhancing the humanity of persons, no matter how sick they appeared to be.

Her book Psychoanalysis: Evolution and Development (1950) is a comprehensive documentation of the course of psychoanalytic theory and practice. Thompson traces the evolution of psychoanalytic theories to demonstrate that psychoanalysis has changed since its Freudian theorization. Specifically, although she recognizes Freud's genius, she notes the limitations of his theory and focuses on the changes that occurred due to the contributions of the therapists who followed Freud. Thompson also refers to cultural anthropology research as another contributor to the further evolution of psychoanalysis. In this book, she also investigates how the therapist–patient relationship has been viewed over time. She underscores the importance of this relationship in the therapeutic procedure.

In her paper, "The Different Schools of Psychoanalysis" (1957), Thompson notes some of the basic concepts of Freud, Adler, Jung, Rank, Ferenczi, Horney, Sullivan and Fromm. She concludes that, despite the differences between these approaches to the field of ego psychology, all these writers are aiming at "the creation of a science of man built on the foundation Freud has laid."

=== Psychology of women in a cultural context ===
Clara Thompson presented an outline of the main facts concerning the psychology of women and placed this within the context of the social meanings that are assigned to biological differences between the two sexes in different cultural contexts. This outline stimulated further exploration of the subject. Thompson considered the status of women in relation to men in regard to how it has fluctuated over the centuries and in different cultures and societies. In formulating a psychology of women, she stated that one has to consider, first, what is basically different about men and women; second, what variations on this basic pattern have been produced by cultural tradition; and third, how these variations seem to promote or inhibit the basic biological strivings.

In her work, she credited Freud with developing theories about the psychology of women, but she took issue with his focus on male psychology. She insisted that women's psychology is "something in its own right and not merely a negation of maleness."

Thompson saw gender most fundamentally as a cultural creation: gender characteristics are established by the assignment of social cultural meanings to biological differences. She saw adolescence as the most problematic phase for girls, because of their perception of differences in social constraints and power. Thompson suggested that, because of economic disparities and the use of seductiveness as an understandable compensatory commodity, "woman's alleged narcissism and greater need to be loved may be entirely the result of economic necessity". In her paper "Towards a Psychology of Women" (1953), Thompson tries to find some general elements of the psychology of the American woman in her time.^{[1]} She focuses on ways in which society frustrates or distorts basic biological drives of women.

== Bibliography ==
- Psychoanalysis: Evolution and Development, 1950
- Interpersonal Psychoanalysis: The Selected Papers of Clara M. Thompson, ed. M. R. Green, 1964
- On Women, ed. M. R. Green, 1971
