= David Rioch =

American psychiatric research scientist and neuroanatomist

- Born: 6 July 1900; Mussoorie, India
- Died: 11 September 1985 (aged 85); Chevy Chase, Maryland
- Occupations: Psychiatric research scientist and neuroanatomist

David McKenzie Rioch (July 6, 1900 – September 11, 1985) was a psychiatric research scientist and neuroanatomist, known as a pioneer in brain research and for leading the interdisciplinary neuropsychiatry division at the Walter Reed Army Institute of Research (1951–1970), a program that contributed to the formation of the then-nascent field of neuroscience.

W. Maxwell Cowan, Donald H. Harter, and Eric R. Kandel cited "the seminal roles played by David McKenzie Rioch, Francis O. Schmitt, and ... Stephen W. Kuffler in creating neuroscience as we now know it."

== Early life and career ==
Rioch was born in Mussoorie, India, on July 6, 1900. His parents, David and Minnie, were Christian missionaries. He received a bachelor's degree from Butler College in 1920, after which he went on to receive a medical degree from the Johns Hopkins University School of Medicine in 1924. He then trained in surgery at the Peter Bent Brigham Hospital, followed by the Strong Memorial Hospital. In 1928–9, he studied in the Laboratory of Comparative Neurology at the University of Michigan, under a fellowship from the National Research Council, where he began research on the anatomy of mammalian diencephalons, research that he continued in 1929 at Oxford University. In these studies, he demonstrated in detail for the first time how the forebrains of dogs and cats are more complex than those of rodents. Rioch was associate professor of anatomy at Harvard Medical School from 1931 to 1938. He became professor of neurology and chairman of the Department of Neuropsychiatry at the Washington University School of Medicine from 1938 to 1943. He also spent one year at the Institute for Advanced Study in Princeton, New Jersey. In 1943, during World War II, he became director of research at the Chestnut Lodge psychiatric hospital in Rockville, Maryland, jointly with leading the Washington School of Psychiatry, positions he held until 1951.

== Walter Reed Army Institute of Research ==
From 1951 until his retirement in 1970, Rioch served as the founding director of the Division of Neuropsychiatry at the Water Reed Army Institute of Research. During his tenure, Rioch particularly studied the relationship between stress and major depressive disorder, and he emphasized the use of basic anatomical and physiological methods in informing psychiatric research on human behavior. Rioch also established connections between reproductive physiology and neurophysiology in the primate brain. His clinical psychiatric interests were heavily influenced by Harry Stack Sullivan, and during the Korean War, he personally observed the stress experienced by combat troops during the Battle of Pork Chop Hill. Rioch's division was the precursor to the National Institute of Mental Health, under the leadership of Rioch's student, Joseph V. Brady. After retiring in 1970, Rioch continued to give guest lectures at Johns Hopkins, the University of Chicago, and the Uniformed Services University of the Health Sciences, and served as a senior scientist at the Institute for Behavioral Research in Silver Spring, Maryland.

Cowan, Harter, and Kandel argue that Rioch paved the way for the development of neuroscience as a scientific discipline in the 1950s, when he helped create one of the first interdisciplinary psychiatric research programs at Walter Reed, composed of two interacting groups of scientists, a behavioral group and a brain group. David Hubel has written that "In the neuropsychiatry division, David Rioch had assembled a broad and lively group of young neuroscientists ... the focus was on the entire nervous system, not on a subdivision of biological subject matter based on methods."

== Personal life ==
Rioch married clinical psychologist Margaret Jeffrey Rioch in 1938. In the 1960s, they lived in the suburb of Somerset, Maryland, sometimes referred to jokingly as the "Freudian Village" or "Little Vienna" due to the high number of psychiatrists in the neighborhood. Margaret practiced psychology out of a custom office in their home while he worked at Walter Reed. Rioch died at home in Chevy Chase, Maryland, on September 11, 1985, following heart problems.
