= Margaret Rioch =

American psychotherapist

Margaret Jeffrey Rioch (1907–1996) was an American psychotherapist, internationally known for her critical work in the field of psychology. She is best known for her role in establishing a new method of training for mental health counselors. Rioch's publications and projects have directly led to the current systems of mental health care treatment. Notable methods that have stemmed from her work include crisis hotlines and the use of support groups. She died in 1996 at the age of 89.

== Biography ==
=== Education ===
Margaret Rioch was born in 1907 in the city of Paterson, NJ. She graduated in the late 1920s, and obtained an undergraduate degree from Wellesley College, located in Wellesley Massachusetts. Following this, Rioch pursued a post graduate degree, and graduated with a Ph.D. in Germanic philology from Bryn Mawr College in 1933. She subsequently received an M.A. in psychology from St. Louis University.

==== Career ====
After receiving her doctorate, Rioch began her career as an assistant professor at Wellesley College. During this period of time she met her husband, David Rioch M.D. and moved with him to St. Louis where he became Chair and Professor of Psychiatry at Washington University. Because of nepotism rules, she was unable to get a promised faculty position there and decided to make a career change to psychology. She received her psychology degree and worked as a child psychologist. David Rioch moved to a new position at the famous Chestnut Lodge Hospital in Rockville, MD and Margaret taught psychology at Catholic University in Washington, DC. She subsequently became the first psychologist to practice at the Chestnut Lodge.

Margaret Rioch then began working at the National Institute of Mental Health (1960). Her studies focus on the training of housewives to become future psychotherapists. As one of the few women in her discipline, Margaret became a pioneer for opening opportunities to more middle aged women. She believed that women, in particular mothers who have had experience raising children, had a greater capacity for nurturing and helping in the field of psychotherapy. Her training focused on creating jobs specifically for females in the psychotherapy field. In order to prove the validity of her training, she performed an experiment using eight 40-year-old women. The results concluded her training did in fact have the ability to certify carefully selected, mature adults as psychotherapists.

Having completed this landmark study, she accepted a position as Professor of Psychology at The American University. While there, she focused on the practice of zen, eventually becoming trained in the art, and incorporating it into her methods of treatment. She collaborated with influential scholars such as D.T Suzuki, Alan Watts, and Martin Buber, and there combined work most likely influenced her future interests in group dynamics.

Additionally, Rioch famously founded the internationally recognized A.K. Rice Institute for the Study of Social Systems (AKRI), based on the work of Wilfred Bion and Kenneth Rice of London’s Tavistock Institute. The AKRI studies group dynamics, initially focusing on finding which circumstances lead to irrational behavior among social groups.

== Published works ==
1. Jarl E. Dyrud & Margaret J. Rioch (1953) Multiple Therapy in the Treatment Program of a Mental Hospital, Psychiatry, 16:1, 21–26, doi:10.1080/00332747.1953.11022905
2. Margaret J. Rioch (1971) “All We like Sheep-” (Isaiah 53:6): Followers and Leaders, Psychiatry, 34:3, 258–273, doi:10.1080/00332747.1971.11023673
3. Rioch, M. J. (1966). Changing concepts in the training of therapists. Journal of Consulting Psychology, 30(4), 290–292. https://doi.org/10.1037/h00235
4. Margaret J. Rioch (1986) Fifty Years at the Washington School of Psychiatry, Psychiatry, 49:1, 33-44, doi:10.1080/00332747.1986.11024
5. Margaret J. Rioch (1970) The Work of Wilfred Bion on Groups, Psychiatry, 33:1, 56–66, doi:10.1080/00332747.1970.11023613

Of all her published works, her published manuscripts titled "Changing concepts in the training of therapists." and "The Work of Wilfred Bion on Groups" are debatably her most influential. These both were part of her headway into formatting the future of psychotherapy training. As previously mentioned, Rioch considered middle-aged mothers to be the most successful employees in such a field, and these papers delve deeper into her reasoning. Her work continues to influence the field of psychotherapy as a whole.
