= Interpersonal psychoanalysis =

Psychological method

Interpersonal psychoanalysis is based on the theories of American psychiatrist Harry Stack Sullivan (1892–1949). Sullivan believed that the details of a patient's interpersonal interactions with others can provide insight into the causes and cures of mental disorder.

Current practitioners stress such features as the detailed description of clinical experience, the mutuality of the interpersonal process, and the not-knowing of the analyst.

== Sullivan and the neo-Freudians ==
Along with other neo-Freudian practitioners of interpersonal psychoanalysis, such as Horney, Fromm, Thompson and Fromm-Reichman, Sullivan repudiated Freudian drive theory.

They, like Sullivan, also shared the interdisciplinary emphasis that was to be an important part of the legacy of interpersonal psychoanalysis, influencing counsellors, clergymen, social workers and more.

== Selective inattention ==
Sullivan proposed that patients could keep certain aspects or components of their interpersonal relationships out of their awareness by a psychological behavior described as selective inattention - a term that has to a degree passed into common usage.

A defence mechanism that functions prior to psychological repression, and acts by way of blocking all notice of the threat in question, selective inattention can also be accompanied by selective non-participation.

Both defences as used by patients may be usefully identified by the analyst through examination of his/her countertransference.

== Personifications ==
Sullivan emphasized that psychotherapists' analyses should focus on patients' relationships and personal interactions in order to obtain knowledge of what he called personifications – one's internalised views of self and others, one's internal schemata.

Such analyses would consist of detailed questioning regarding moment-to-moment personal interactions, even including those with the analyst himself.

Personifications can form the basis for what Sullivan called parataxic distortions of the interpersonal field – distortions similar to those described as the products of transference and projective identification in orthodox psychoanalysis. As with the latter, parataxic distortion can, if identified by the analyst, prove fruitful clues to the nature of the patient's inner world.

== Criticism ==
Sullivan has been criticised for inventing (sometimes opaque) neologisms for established psychoanalytic concepts, to claim a perhaps spurious intellectual independence.

== See also ==
- Elephant in the room
- Interpersonal psychotherapy
- Intersubjective psychoanalysis
- Family therapy
- Relational psychoanalysis
- Relationship counseling
- Transactional analysis
