= William Alanson White Institute =

American psychoanalytic training organization

The William Alanson White Institute (WAWI), founded in 1943, is an institution for training psychoanalysts and psychotherapists that also offers general psychotherapy and psychoanalysis. It is located in the Clara Thompson building of the Upper West Side of New York, New York. It was founded as a protest against the mainstream of American psychoanalytic thought, which was thought to be sterile, dogmatic, and constrictive by the psychoanalysts who founded the institute. WAWI also offers continuing education, through conferences, lectures, and symposia, and publishes Contemporary Psychoanalysis.

== Background ==
William Alanson White was an American psychiatrist who became superintendent of the "Government Hospital for the Insane", later named St. Elizabeths Hospital, in Washington, D.C. He was known for humanizing the treatment of the mentally ill, doing away with restraints, and offering occupational therapy to patients. The founders of WAWI are Erich Fromm and Clara Thompson, joined by Harry Stack Sullivan, Frieda Fromm-Reichmann, David Rioch and Janet Rioch.

WAWI takes an unashamedly progressive political stance on many issues. It emphasizes psychoanalytic activism in relation to issues of importance in culture and society, and addresses problems of living which are considered to be beyond the scope of classical psychoanalysis. WAWI is strongly influenced by the work of Sándor Ferenczi, a member of Freud's inner circle who pioneered the analyst's authentic use of himself in the consulting room, emphasizing the mutuality of the relationship between therapist and client.

== Achievements ==
In 2001, the American Psychoanalytic Association presented its first Psychoanalytic Community Clinic of the Year Award to the Clinical Service of the William Alanson White Institute. WAWI publishes the journal Contemporary Psychoanalysis. The journal reports advances in the application of psychotherapy and psychoanalysis to depression, personality disorders, conflicts about sex and gender, and other psychological problems.

== Alumni ==
- Janet Asimov (1960–1986) psychiatrist and psychoanalyst, published research under the name Janet O. Jeppson.
- Louis Carroll English (–2001) faculty member, Director of Clinical Services, and President of WAWI

== See also ==
- William Alanson White
- Contemporary Psychoanalysis
