= Contemporary Psychoanalysis =

- Discipline: Psychoanalysis
- Language: English
- Edited by: Susan Fabrick, Ruth Livingston

Publication details
- History: 1964–present
- Publisher: Routledge on behalf of the William Alanson White Institute and the William Alanson White Psychoanalytic Society
- Frequency: Quarterly
- Open access: Hybrid
- Impact factor: 0.5 (2023)

Standard abbreviations
- ISO 4: Contemp. Psychoanal.

Indexing
- ISSN: 0010-7530 (print); 2330-9091 (web)
- LCCN: 67058330
- OCLC no.: 60651913

Links
- Journal homepage; Online access; Online archive

Contemporary Psychoanalysis is a quarterly peer-reviewed academic journal covering all aspects of psychoanalysis. It is published by Routledge on behalf of the William Alanson White Institute and the William Alanson White Psychoanalytic Society. It was established in 1964 by the founding editors-in-chief Max Deutscher and Rose Spiegel. The current editors-in-chief are Susan Fabrick and Ruth Livingston.

== Abstracting and indexing ==
The journal is abstracted and indexed by:

- Current Contents/Social and Behavioral Sciences
- EBSCO databases
- International Bibliography of Periodical Literature
- Modern Language Association Database
- PsycINFO
- Scopus
- Social Sciences Citation Index

According to the Journal Citation Reports, the journal has a 2023 impact factor of 0.5.
