= Harry Stack Sullivan =

American psychiatrist and psychoanalyst (1892–1949)

Herbert "Harry" Stack Sullivan (February 21, 1892 – January 14, 1949) was an American neo-Freudian psychiatrist and psychoanalyst who held that "personality can never be isolated from the complex interpersonal relationships in which [a] person lives" and that "[t]he field of psychiatry is the field of interpersonal relations under any and all circumstances in which [such] relations exist". Having studied therapists Sigmund Freud, Adolf Meyer, and William Alanson White, he devoted years of clinical and research work to helping people with psychotic illness.

== Early life ==
Sullivan was a child of Irish immigrants. He was born and grew up in the then anti-Catholic town of Norwich, New York, resulting in a social isolation that may have inspired his later interest in psychiatry. He attended the Smyrna Union School, then spent two years at Cornell University from 1909, receiving his medical degree in Chicago College of Medicine and Surgery in 1917.

== Work ==
Along with Clara Thompson, Karen Horney, Erich Fromm, Otto Allen Will Jr., Erik H. Erikson, and Frieda Fromm-Reichmann, Sullivan laid the groundwork for understanding the individual based on the network of relationships in which they are enmeshed. He developed a theory of psychiatry based on interpersonal relationships where cultural forces are largely responsible for mental illnesses (see also social psychiatry). In his words, one must pay attention to the "interactional", not the "intrapsychic". This search for satisfaction via personal involvement with others led Sullivan to characterize loneliness as the most painful human experience. He also extended Freudian psychoanalysis to the treatment of patients with severe mental disorders, particularly schizophrenia.

Besides making the first mention of the significant other in psychological literature, Sullivan developed the idea of the "Self system", a configuration of the personality traits developed in childhood and reinforced by positive affirmation and the security operations developed in childhood to avoid anxiety and threats to self-esteem. Sullivan further defined the Self System as a steering mechanism toward a series of I-You interlocking behaviors—that is, what an individual does is meant to elicit a particular reaction.

Sullivan called these behaviors Parataxical Integrations and noted that such action-reaction combinations can become rigid and dominate an adult's thinking pattern, limiting their actions and reactions to the world as the adult sees it, not as it really is. The resulting inaccuracies in judgment Sullivan termed parataxic distortion, when other persons are perceived or evaluated based on the patterns of previous experience, similar to Freud's notion of transference. Sullivan also introduced the concept of "prototaxic communication" as a more primitive, needy, infantile form of psychic interchange and "syntactic communication" as a mature style of emotional interaction.

Sullivan's work on interpersonal relationships became the foundation of interpersonal psychoanalysis, a school of psychoanalytic theory and treatment that stresses detailed exploration of the nuances of patients' patterns of interacting with others.

Sullivan was the first to coin the term "problems in living" to describe the difficulties with self and others that people experience. This phrase was later picked up and popularized by Thomas Szasz, whose work was a foundational resource for the antipsychiatry movement. "Problems in living" went on to become the movement's preferred way to refer to the manifestations of mental disturbances.

In 1927, he reviewed the controversial, anonymously published The Invert and his Social Adjustment and in 1929 called it "a remarkable document by a homosexual man of refinement; intended primarily as a guide to the unfortunate sufferers of sexual inversion, and much less open to criticism than anything else of the kind so far published."

He was one of the founders of the William Alanson White Institute, considered by many the world's leading independent psychoanalytic institute, and of the journal Psychiatry in 1937. He headed the Washington, D.C., School of Psychiatry from 1936 to 1947.

In 1940, he and colleague Winfred Overholser, serving on the American Psychiatric Society's committee on Military Mobilization, formulated guidelines for the psychological screening of inductees to the U.S. military. He believed, writes one historian, "that sexuality played a minimal role in causing mental disorders and that adult homosexuals should be accepted and left alone." Despite his best efforts, others included homosexuality as a disqualification for military service.

Beginning on December 5, 1940, Sullivan served as psychiatric adviser to Selective Service director Clarence A. Dykstra, but resigned in November 1941 after General Lewis B. Hershey, who was hostile to psychiatry, became the director. Sullivan then took part in establishing the Office of War Information in 1942.

== Personal life ==
Sullivan spent the last 22 years of his life in a relationship with James Inscoe, who was 20 years younger than Sullivan. Although some contemporaries and historians have regarded Inscoe as an adopted son, the biography of his colleague Helen Swick Perry mentions the relationship, suggesting that close friends were aware they were partners.

Sullivan died in Paris in 1949.

== Writings ==
Although Sullivan published little in his lifetime, he influenced generations of mental health professionals, especially through his lectures at Chestnut Lodge in Rockville, Maryland. Leston Havens called him the most important underground influence in American psychoanalysis. His ideas were collected and published posthumously, edited by Helen Swick Perry, who also published a detailed biography in 1982 (Perry, 1982, Psychiatrist of America).

== Works ==
The following works are in Special Collections (MSA SC 5547) at the Maryland State Archives in Annapolis: Conceptions of Modern Psychiatry, Soundscriber Transcriptions (Feb. 1945-May 1945); Lectures 1-97 (begins Oct. 2, 1942); Georgetown University Medical School Lectures (1939); Personal Psychopathology (1929–1933); The Psychiatry of Character and its Deviations-undated notes.

His writings include:

1. The Interpersonal Theory of Psychiatry (1953)
2. "The Psychiatric Interview" (1954)
3. Conceptions of Modern Psychiatry (1947/1966)
4. Schizophrenia as a Human Process (1962)

== Relationship to the Sullivanians ==
After Sullivan's death, Saul B. Newton and his wife Jane Pearce established the Sullivan Institute for Research in Psychoanalysis in New York City, whose therapists and patients were commonly known as "Sullivanians".

Newton and Pearce had worked with Sullivan at the William Alanson White Institute, and Pearce was a psychiatrist who studied with Sullivan in the late 1940s.

Although the institute was named for Sullivan, it is widely regarded as a cult, offering a distorted view of Sullivan's teachings.
