= Anna Ornstein =

Hungarian-American psychoanalyst (1927–2025)

- Born: Anna Brünn; January 27, 1927; Szendrő, Hungary
- Died: July 2, 2025 (aged 98); Brookline, Massachusetts, U.S.
- Education: Heidelberg University School of Medicine
- Known for: Self psychology
- Spouse: Paul Ornstein (m. 1946; died 2017)
- Children: 3
- Scientific career
- Fields: Psychoanalysis
- Workplaces: University of Cincinnati Medical School; Harvard Medical School

Anna Ornstein (née Brünn; January 27, 1927 – July 2, 2025) was a Hungarian-American Auschwitz survivor, psychoanalyst and psychiatrist, author, speaker, and scholar.

== Early life ==
Anna Brünn was born into a Jewish family in Szendrő, Hungary, which at the time had around 4,000 residents. Because the small town only had 40 Jewish families, Ornstein felt the presence of anti-semitism while growing up.

=== Holocaust ===
When the German Army took over Hungary in 1944, Jews in Szendrő were quickly identified, forced to wear yellow stars and were sought out for extermination.

Anna's two brothers were sent to forced-labor camps, while she and the rest of her family were sent to Auschwitz. Her two brothers died at the camps, and the Germans killed her father and extended family when they arrived at Auschwitz in June 1944. However, Anna and her mother survived deportation, Auschwitz, ghetto imprisonment, and the Parschnitz labor camp. The two returned to Hungary in July 1945.

== Life after the Holocaust ==
Upon returning to Hungary, her mother ran an orphanage for Jewish children whose parents did not come back from the Holocaust. She was reunited with Paul Ornstein, whom she had met several years before and who had also survived the Holocaust. The two married in March 1946 and subsequently escaped from Hungary into West Germany and enrolled in the Heidelberg School of Medicine.

=== Medical training ===
After earning their medical degrees in 1952 from Heidelberg University School of Medicine, where some of their classmates were former Nazi soldiers, Anna and Paul emigrated to the United States. The two were also graduates of the Chicago Institute for Psychoanalysis.

== Medical career ==
Ornstein served as a long-time Professor and Emerita Professor of Child Psychiatry at University of Cincinnati Medical School and later as a lecturer in psychiatry at Harvard Medical School.

She was a Training and Supervising Analyst at the Cincinnati Psychoanalytic Institute and a Supervising Analyst at the Boston Psychoanalytic Society and Institute and Massachusetts Institute for Psychoanalysis. She and her husband also co-founded and were co-directors of the International Center for the Study of Psychoanalytic Self-Psychology.

At the University of Cincinnati, Anna and Paul were instrumental in developing and leading the self psychology movement, "a post-Freudian method developed by Heinz Kohut, which stresses empathy and a relational approach in order to enhance the bond between patient and therapist and provide an analytic cure." They worked very closely with Kohut.

Ornstein wrote over 100 publications that cover a wide range of topics, including the interpretive process in psychoanalysis, psychoanalytic psychotherapy, child psychotherapy, treatment of children and families, and post-traumatic recovery.

== Holocaust education ==
Ornstein was an educator on the Holocaust and talked to universities, secondary schools, organizations, synagogues, and groups around the world about the Holocaust, her experiences, and anti-Semitism. She especially had a presence within the Boston area and spoke to students at colleges including Tufts University, Northeastern University, and Brandeis University.

Ornstein was interviewed by The Washington Post, featured in The Jewish Journal, interviewed on Boston's National Public Radio station WGBH, and featured in numerous other publications. She also served as a staff member of Facing History and Ourselves and the Terezin Music Foundation.

In 2004, Ornstein published her memoir, My Mother's Eyes: Holocaust Memories of a Young Girl, a collection of short stories of her life during the war.

== Personal life and death ==
As a young girl Ornstein met Paul Ornstein, whom she would marry years later. Although the Holocaust separated the two of them, they reunited after the war. After embarking upon very similar careers, the couple completed much research together and were frequent collaborators. Together, the Ornsteins had three children, all three of whom became pyschiatrists.

Paul Ornstein died on January 19, 2017, at age 92.

Ornstein died in Brookline, Massachusetts on July 2, 2025, at age 98.

== Awards ==
Ornstein was the recipient of numerous awards, related to both her work in medicine and in Holocaust education:

- American Psychiatric Association's Distinguished Psychiatrist Lecturer Award (1989)
- Rosenberry Award for Dedication to the care of children (1991)
- University of Cincinnati Award for Excellence in Research and Scholarship (1996)
- American Psychiatric Association's Special Presidential Commendation (2000)
- Boston Psychoanalytic Society and Institute's Arthur R. Kravitz Award for Community Action and Humanitarian Contributions "in recognition of a lifetime of dedication to teaching about the Holocaust" (2018)
- Reading Select Board presented her a Certificate of Gratitude for her work with schools in Reading, Massachusetts on Holocaust and anti-semitism education (2018)

In their address honoring Ornstein with the Kravitz Award in 2018, Boston Psychoanalytic Society and Institute wrote:

"As a leader of American psychoanalysis, Dr. Ornstein has woven together the roles of scholar, clinician, teacher, and voice of conscience. There is perhaps no one who more fully fits the description of humanitarian psychoanalyst and activist than Dr. Ornstein. She later demonstrated this after a series of anti-Semitic events in the Reading schools this fall. Dr. Ornstein felt it was urgent to respond, both to the specific events and to the general political situation in our country. In particular, she felt it was critical to draw attention to the dangers of gradually accepting previously unthinkable repression and of normalizing outrageous intolerance. She met with Reading town officials and teachers and helped organize a group called Reading Embraces Diversity. She also talked to several hundred sixth, seventh, and eighth graders in Reading schools, presenting a piece on Kristallnacht that looked at similarities and differences between the situation in Europe in the 1930s and the current situation in the United States. After her presentation, the students asked questions about what had happened in Europe and whether it could happen here."
