= Paul Ornstein =

Hungarian-American psychoanalyst (1924–2017)

- Born: Ornstein Pál; April 4, 1924; Hajdúnánás, Hungary
- Died: January 19, 2017 (aged 92); Brookline, Massachusetts, U.S.
- Citizenship: Hungarian; American
- Education: Heidelberg University School of Medicine
- Known for: Self psychology
- Spouse: Anna Ornstein (m. 1946)
- Children: 3
- Scientific career
- Fields: Psychoanalysis
- Workplaces: University of Cincinnati Academic Health Center; Harvard Medical School

Paul Hermann Ornstein (Hungarian: Ornstein Pál; April 4, 1924, Hajdúnánás, Hungary – January 19, 2017, Brookline, MA, US) was a Hungarian-American psychoanalyst and Holocaust survivor.

== Early life ==
Ornstein was born in Hungary in a Jewish family to parents, Abraham Ornstein, an accountant, and Frieda Sziment. At 15, Ornstein left home to attend Franz Josef National Rabbinical Seminary in Debrecen, Hungary. On a visit home from seminary, he met his future wife Anna Brunn.

=== Interest in psychoanalysis ===
While he did attend a rabbinical seminary, he did not want to become a rabbi; rather, he wanted to study literature, archaeology, and philosophy. His interest in psychology evolved from reading novels, handwriting analysis, and poetry. At the seminary, he joined a study group that read Interpretation of Dreams by Sigmund Freud as well as Thalassa by Sándor Ferenczi and Ritual by Theodor Reik. Reik's book fostered Ornstein's interest in psychoanalysis especially because of his ability to connect it to his daily life as an observant Jew. Thus, at 15, he decided that he wanted to be a psychoanalyst.

=== The Holocaust ===
In March 1944, Germans invaded Hungary, and Ornstein was forced by the German Army to dig trenches as part of a forced labor battalion in World War II on the eastern front of Poland and Ukraine. He was successful on his third attempt to escape from his battalion and reached Budapest, which was still occupied by Nazis at the time. During the siege of Budapest, he spent several months during 1944 hiding in the basement of the annex of the Swiss Embassy in Budapest. After the Soviet army took over Hungary, he returned to his hometown in search of his family and Anna. However, Russian soldiers arrested him and forced him to work in a Soviet labor battalion until he escaped. Other people were living in his childhood home and no one had heard of his family or Anna. Initially, he found no surviving relatives.

With few options, he decided to leave with a friend to Romania and enroll in the medical school at the University of Cluj. Months after the war had ended, Ornstein was still in medical school in Romania when he discovered that his mother and three younger brothers were murdered in Auschwitz. However, in the same week, he got two telegrams from Budapest: one from his father, who had survived a six-month death march, and the other from Anna, who had survived Auschwitz. He hid in a freight train and returned to Budapest.

== Life after the Holocaust ==
Although Anna's deportation to Auschwitz separated them during the war, Paul and Anna found their way back to one another. The two married in 1946. Three weeks after their marriage, Paul and Anna attempted to flee Hungary. At first, the government apprehended them, gave them a warning, and then released them. After their second attempt, the Zionist Underground Movement helped Anna and Paul safely into Vienna, Austria. Upon briefly staying in Vienna, the two left for Bavaria and then to Heidelberg, Germany.

=== Medical training ===
Paul's began his second year of medical school at the University of Budapest as the Communists seized power, before escaping with Anna to Western Europe. Paul attended one year of medical school at the Ludwig-Maximilians-Universität München and then he and Anna enrolled at the Heidelberg University School of Medicine, where many former Nazi soldiers were their classmates and some still wore parts of their uniforms. They lived and studied in Heidelberg until 1952 they immigrated to the United States with refugee visas. However, only five states would allow them to take medical board exams which would certify them as American doctors, merely because of their immigrant status. Eventually, the two moved to Ohio, and he scored the highest in the state on the exam. The United States had almost no residency training programs that would accept immigrants, so Paul and Anna found work in hospitals in Delaware, New York, New Jersey, and Massachusetts until 1955 when the University of Cincinnati Medical School's chair of psychiatry - who was also a psychoanalyst - recruited them.

Paul and Anna also were graduates of the Chicago Institute for Psychoanalysis.

== Career ==
Both Paul and Anna Ornstein were pioneers in the self psychology movement, which challenged traditional Freudian analysis and pushed therapists to disregard any misconceptions and enter fully into their patients' lives. Heinz Kohut trained both Paul and Anna, and Paul was one of three of Kohut's disciples who Kohut expected to carry his legacy.

Ornstein worked as a Professor of Psychiatry and Psychoanalysis at the University of Cincinnati Medical School, Lecturer at Harvard Medical School, and Supervising Analyst at the Boston Psychoanalytic Society and Institute. He was also a prolific writer, clinician, lecturer, teacher, and mentor. Ornstein served on many editorial boards and published over 100 scholarly, clinical, and theoretical articles in numerous languages - many of which he wrote with his wife Anna.

He wrote Focal Psychotherapy: An Example of Applied Psychoanalysis with Michael Balint and Enid Balint and also edited four volumes of The Search for the Self: Selected Writings of Heinz Kohut. In 2015, he published a memoir, Looking Back: Memoir of a Psychoanalyst, which Helen Epstein co-authored.

In May 2019, The International Journal of Psychoanalysis published a multipage obituary for Ornstein detailing his incredible life and immense impact on psychoanalysis. The piece's author, psychoanalyst Dr. Jeffrey K. Halpern, explains Ornstein's contributions to psychoanalysis and psychiatry:

"Ornstein’s writings encompassed the uses of empathy, the interpretative process, omnipotence in health and illness, “Chronic Rage from Underground,” unconscious fantasy, dreams, the conceptualization of clinical facts and the patient's encounters with the analyst's theory...Ornstein deepened our knowledge of patients who suffer from narcissistic personality and behaviour disorders and expanded psychoanalytic techniques. He developed [Heinz] Kohut's original contributions, especially the functions of empathy and the conceptualization of narcissistic transferences, later referred to as selfobject transferences within a self-selfobject matrix. He described a basic direction, still often neglected, for analytic treatment; a patient first needs to feel accepted and understood before it is meaningful to understand, and it is only then that a patient and an analyst can work on a structure for the interpretive process (Ornstein and Ornstein 1996). Before his encounter with self psychology, Ornstein wrote that a structure for the interpretative process is built from our sustained efforts at understanding a patient's conscious and unconscious mental life (Ornstein and Kalthoff 1967; Ornstein 1968). Ornstein, more than Kohut and other self psychologists, focused on the way the analyst and patient get to interpretations rather than on the contents of interpretations."

== Personal life and death ==
Paul and Anna, both Holocaust survivors, were married for 71 years. The two entered medical school, psychoanalysis, and self-psychology together, leading very intertwined lives as professionals. Not only did the couple often conduct research and lead workshops together, they both served as faculty members at University of Cincinnati Medical School and later lecturers at Harvard Medical School. They also co-founded and formally served as co-directors of the International Association for Psychoanalytic Self-Psychology. The couple had three children.

Ornstein died on January 19, 2017, at age 92.

Ornstein's widow died on July 2, 2025, at age 98.
