= Jerome Kavka =

American psychoanalyst (1921–2012)

Jerome Kavka (October 9, 1921 in Chicago, Illinois – May 14, 2012 in Oakland, California) was a supervising and training analyst at the Chicago Institute for Psychoanalysis. From the early 1990s until 2006, he also served as archivist for the Institute.

== Biography ==
Kavka was of Polish Jewish ancestry, born in Chicago, Illinois after his parents had emigrated from Poland. He graduated from Marshall High School in Chicago's West Side and proceeded to obtain bachelor's and medical degrees from the University of Illinois at Urbana-Champaign.

As a young intern at St. Elizabeths Hospital in Washington, D.C., immediately after World War II, Kavka treated poet Ezra Pound. Pound was "vigorously and viciously anti-Semitic" and "quite crazy, but Jerry, who was Jewish, managed still to talk to him," said colleague and student Arnold Goldberg of him later.

Kavka's observations, made over a four-month period, ultimately led to a successful insanity plea by Pound, something that helped the poet avoid a possible death sentence for treason. Kavka has written widely on Pound's psychological condition, and his writings are considered important in Pound scholarship.

Kavka's internship was cut short when he was drafted as a physician into the United States Army Medical Corps and became a lieutenant. After his army service, he completed his residency at the Cook County Hospital. In 1966, he joined the Chicago Institute for Psychoanalysis as training and supervising analyst. According to The Chicago Tribune obituary, he was "known for his original and often unconventional wisdom and for his capacity to work outside the classic psychoanalytic mold."

Kavka was married to Georgine Rotman Kavka MD (1922–1996), a psychiatrist and professorial lecturer in the Department of Psychiatry, University of Chicago. He is the father of the late Gregory S. Kavka, a political philosopher, and Audrey Kavka, MD, a San Francisco Bay area psychoanalyst and member of San Francisco Psychoanalytic Society and Institute.
