= Therese Benedek =

Hungarian-American psychoanalyst (1892–1977)

- Born: November 8, 1892; Eger, Hungary
- Died: October 27, 1977 (aged 84); Chicago, Illinois
- Citizenship: United States
- Education: Doctorate in medicine, University of Budapest, 1916
- Known for: Research on psychosomatic medicine, women's psychosexual development, sexual dysfunction, and family relationships
- Spouse: Tibor Benedek
- Children: 2
- Scientific career
- Fields: Psychoanalysis, psychosomatic medicine
- Institutions: University of Leipzig; Chicago Institute for Psychoanalysis

Therese Benedek (November 8, 1892 – October 27, 1977) was a Hungarian-American psychoanalyst, researcher, and educator. Active in Germany and the United States between the years 1921 and 1977, she was regarded for her work on psychosomatic medicine, women's psychosexual development, sexual dysfunction, and family relationships. She was a faculty and staff member of the Chicago Institute for Psychoanalysis from 1936 to 1969.

== Early life and education ==
Therese Friedmann was born in Eger, Hungary, to a traditional Jewish family. Her parents were Ignatius Friedmann and Charlotte Link Friedmann, and she had one brother and two sisters. When she was six years old, her family moved to Budapest. She was the only one of her siblings to receive a university education, graduating from the University of Budapest with a doctorate in medicine in 1916. She was a participant of the Galileo Circle.

== Career ==
Benedek initially decided to pursue a career in child psychology and study the effects of maternal separation on infant emotions. She completed the requirements for a residency in pediatrics in 1918 and began working as an assistant physician at the St. Elizabeth University pediatric clinic in Bratislava. She left this position in 1919 and married shortly afterward. Having taken courses from Hungarian psychoanalyst Sándor Ferenczi, an associate of Sigmund Freud, during her university days, she decided to switch her career track to psychoanalysis. She underwent a five-month training analysis with Ferenczi before leaving Budapest.

In 1920 she and her new husband relocated to Germany to escape the political upheaval in Hungary. In 1920 she became an assistant physician at the Neurological-Psychiatric Clinic of the University of Leipzig and in 1921 opened the city's first private psychoanalytic practice, becoming a training analyst. From 1933 to 1935 she was a training and supervisory analyst at the Berlin Psychoanalytic Institute.

Although as a Jew she was a target of the Nazi Party in Germany in the mid-1930s, Benedek did not feel the need to emigrate, since she considered herself a Hungarian rather than a Jew. Nevertheless, in 1936 her husband convinced her to leave Germany and accept the offer of Franz Alexander to work as a training analyst for the Chicago Institute for Psychoanalysis. She was a faculty and staff member, engaging in teaching, supervising, and research at the institute, for the next 34 years. She acquired her U.S. medical license in 1937 and her U.S. citizenship in 1943. Her husband joined the faculty of Northwestern University School of Medicine.

== Research ==
Benedek is said to have "played a central role in the development of psychoanalysis in the United States". Influenced by the theories of hysteria promulgated by Freud, her early research had sought a link between psychological and endocrinal factors for such problems as anxiety, aggression, and diabetes. In the United States, working with endocrinologist Boris B. Rubinstein, she conducted extensive studies on the correlation between ovulation and female emotions, resulting in the 1942 book The Sexual Cycle in Women. Benedek explored a link between the estrogen/progesterone cycle and a woman's desire to engage in sexual intercourse, nurture a pregnancy, and raise children. She also described the "modern" woman's struggle with her natural maternal role. Benedek's analysis of the "un-motherly modern mother" was widely praised and included in psychology and medical teaching manuals.

Benedek also studied the effects of gender equality and democracy on relationships between spouses and their children. Her 1949 paper Parenthood as a Developmental Phase: A contribution to the libido theory rejected the prevailing theory that psychological development stopped after adolescence; Benedek maintained that it continued throughout parenthood. She published further research on parenthood, family relationships, and depression into her seventies, and continued seeing patients in private practice after her retirement from the Chicago Institute for Psychoanalysis in 1969.

== Affiliations ==
In Germany Benedek was a member of the Berlin Psychoanalytic Society. In the United States she belonged to national and international psychoanalytic organizations and served as president of the Chicago Psychoanalytic Society from 1958 to 1959.

On her eightieth birthday in 1972, the Therese Benedek Research Foundation was established in her honor.

== Personal life ==
In 1919 she married Tibor Benedek, a dermatologist and researcher. She and her husband, a Hungarian Protestant, attended church together regularly. They had one son and one daughter.

She died of a heart attack on October 27, 1977, aged 84. Her husband predeceased her by three years.

Her papers are stored at the Chicago Institute for Psychoanalysis.

== Bibliography ==
=== Books ===
- Insight and Personality Adjustment: A study of the psychological effects of the war. Ronald Press Co. 1946.
- The Sexual Cycle in Women: The relation between ovarian function and psychodynamic processes. National Research Council. 1947. ISBN 9780598508720. (with Boris Benjamin Rubenstein)
- Psychosexual Functions in Women. Ronald Press Co. 1952.
- Psychoanalytical Supervision: A method of clinical training. Grune & Stratton. 1966. (with Joan Fleming)
- Parenthood: Its Psychology and Psychopathology. Little, Brown. 1970. (with E. James Anthony)
- Depression and Human Existence. Little, Brown. 1975. ISBN 978-0316043717. (with E. James Anthony)

=== Selected articles ===
- Dominant Ideas and Their Relation to Morbid Cravings. Baillière, Tindall & Cox. 1936.
- "Adaptation to reality in early infancy". The Psychoanalytic Quarterly. 7. 1938.
- Benedek, Therese (1949). "The psychosomatic implications of the primary unit: Mother-child". American Journal of Orthopsychiatry. 19 (4): 642–654. doi:10.1111/j.1939-0025.1949.tb06521.x. PMID 15391836.
- Benedek, Therese F. (1956). "Toward the Biology of the Depressive Constellation". Journal of the American Psychoanalytic Association. 4 (3): 389–422. doi:10.1177/000306515600400301. PMID 13357379. S2CID 46644154.
- Benedek, Therese (1952). "Infertility as a Psychosomatic Defense". Fertility and Sterility. 3 (6): 527–541. doi:10.1016/S0015-0282(16)31084-6. PMID 12998685.
- Benedek, Therese (1959). "Parenthood as a Developmental Phase: A contribution to the libido theory". Journal of the American Psychoanalytic Association. 7 (3): 389–417. doi:10.1177/000306515900700301. PMID 13672860. S2CID 6977094.
- Psychoanalytic Investigations: Selected Papers. Quadrangle. 1973. ISBN 978-0812903478. – collected papers, 1931-1968

== Sources ==
- Aron, Lewis; Starr, Karen E. (2013). A Psychotherapy for the People: Toward a progressive psychoanalysis. Routledge. ISBN 978-0415529983.
- Buhle, Mari Jo (2004), "Benedek, Therese F.", in Ware, Susan (ed.), Notable American Women: A Biographical Dictionary Completing the Twentieth Century, vol. 5, Harvard University Press, ISBN 978-0674014886
- Freidenreich, Harriet. (2009). "Therese Benedek". Jewish Women: A Comprehensive Historical Encyclopedia. Jewish Women's Archive.
- Heinemann, Isabel (2012), "Social Experts and Modern Women's Reproduction", in Heinemann, Isabel (ed.), Inventing the Modern American Family: Family values and social change in 20th century United States, Campus Verlag, ISBN 978-3593396408
- Schmidt, Erika S. (2000), "Benedek, Therese M.", in Balter, Lawrence (ed.), Parenthood in America: A-M, ABC-CLIO, ISBN 978-1576072134
- Spalek, John M.; Hawrylchak, Sandra H. (1992). Guide to the Archival Materials of the German-speaking Emigration to the United States after 1933. Vol. 2. Walter de Gruyter. ISBN 978-3110971736.
- Weibel, Peter (2005). Beyond Art: A Third Culture: A Comparative Study in Cultures, Art and Science in 20th Century Austria and Hungary. Springer Science & Business Media. ISBN 978-3211245620.
