= Arnold Modell =

American psychologist (1924–2022)

Arnold Howard Modell (December 7, 1924 – January 4, 2022) was an American clinical professor of social psychiatry at the Harvard Medical School and a supervising and training analyst at the Boston Psychoanalytic Society and Institute. He received his bachelor's degree from Columbia College in 1945. Modell is the author of The Private Self (1996), Other Times, Other Realities: Toward a Theory of Psychoanalytic Treatment (1996), and Imagination and the Meaningful Brain (2006). Modell died in Massachusetts on January 4, 2022, at the age of 97.
