= Heinz Kohut =

Austrian-American psychiatrist (1913–1981)

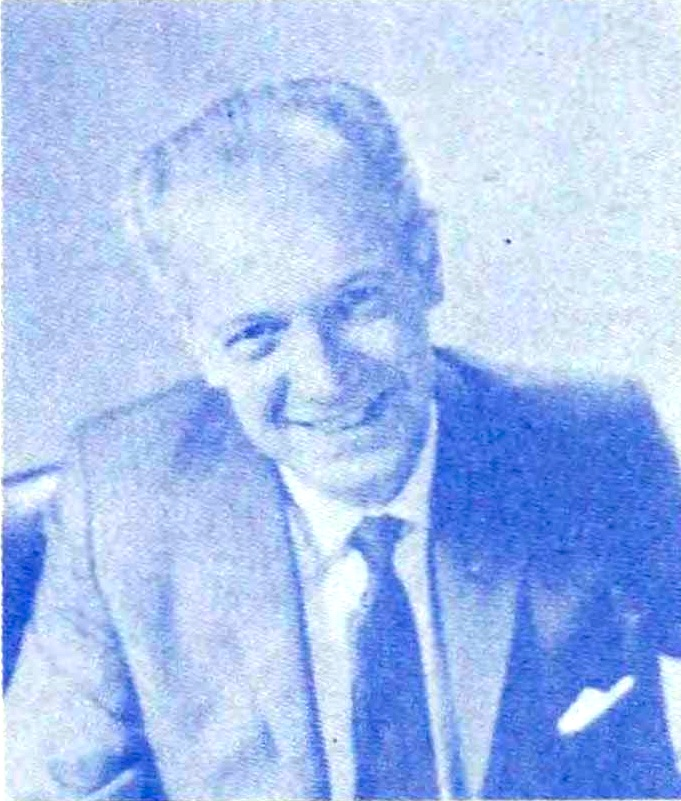
- Kohut, c. 1971
- Born: May 3, 1913; Vienna, Austria-Hungary
- Died: October 8, 1981 (aged 68); Chicago, Illinois, U.S.
- Occupation: Psychoanalyst
- Known for: Self psychology

Heinz Kohut (German: [ˈkoːhuːt]; May 3, 1913 – October 8, 1981) was an Austrian-born American psychoanalyst best known for his development of self psychology, an influential school of thought within psychodynamic/psychoanalytic theory which helped transform the modern practice of analytic and dynamic treatment approaches.

== Early life ==
Kohut was born on May 3, 1913, in Vienna, Austria-Hungary, to Felix Kohut and Else Kohut (née Lampl). He was the only child of the family. Kohut's parents were assimilated Jews living in Alsergrund, or the Ninth District, who had married two years earlier. His father was an aspiring concert pianist, but abandoned his dreams having been traumatized by his experiences in World War I and moved into business with Paul Bellak. His mother opened her own shop sometime after the war, something that few women did at that time in Vienna. Else's relationship with her son has been described as "narcissistic enmeshment".

Kohut was not enrolled in school until the fifth grade. Before that he was taught by several tutors, a series of "Fräuleins and mademoiselles". Special care was taken that he learn French. From 1924 on he attended the Döblinger Gymnasium in Grinzing, or the 19th District, where the Kohuts built a house. During his time at the school he had one, then he had been isolated from his peers by his mother. At school, a special emphasis was given to the Greek and Latin languages and Greek and Roman literature. Kohut also came to appreciate Goethe, Thomas Mann and Robert Musil.

In 1929, Kohut spent two months in Saint-Quay-Portrieux in Brittany in order to study French. At school he wrote his thesis on Euripides' play The Cyclops. His Latin teacher, who had antisemitic sentiments and later participated in the Austrian Nazi movement, accused him of plagiarism. The thesis was accepted after Kohut's father intervened.

Kohut entered the medical faculty of the University of Vienna in 1932. His studies took six years, during which time he spent six months in internships in Paris, first at the Hôtel-Dieu, and then at the Hôpital Saint-Louis. The latter hospital specialized in the treatment of syphilis, which subjected Kohut to shocking experiences. In Paris, he became acquainted with Jacques Palaci, a Jewish medical student from Istanbul, and paid a visit to him in 1936. The following year, Kohut's father died of leukemia. Sometime after this, Kohut entered psychotherapy with Walter Marseilles, who seems not to have been competent at his profession. Early in 1938, Kohut began psychoanalysis with August Aichhorn, a close friend of Sigmund Freud.

After Austria was annexed to Germany by Hitler on March 12, 1938, the new regime presented difficulties for Kohut, as he still had to take his final exams at the medical faculty. He was eventually allowed to take them after all the Jewish professors had been removed from the university. The Nazis then effectively confiscated all property owned by Jews. The property was sold for much less than its market value, and much of the rest was taken by the state in taxes. Kohut eventually left Austria, landing first in a refugee camp in Kent, England. Many of his relatives who stayed behind were killed in the Holocaust.

In February 1940, Kohut was allowed to travel in a British convoy to Boston, from where he travelled to Chicago by bus. A friend from Vienna, Siegmund Levarie, who had emigrated to live with an uncle in Chicago and who would subsequently become a famous musicologist in the United States, arranged a visa for him and invited him to join him there. Kohut's mother Else also emigrated to Chicago, traveling via Italy. With the money she had smuggled out of Austria, she opened a shop called "De Elsie's".

== Early days in Chicago ==
Kohut was able to secure his first position in the South Shore Hospital in Chicago, and in 1941 he began a residency in neurology at the University of Chicago's Billings Hospital, where he lived and worked until 1948. He was board certified in neurology in 1947. Around this time, he apparently decided that he would assume a gentile identity, and chose the Unitarian Church as his denomination.

Kohut was unhappy with neurology, and it seems he was bored in this field. Too much of his time was spent in the laboratory, and there was not enough contact with human emotion.

== Career as a psychoanalyst ==
=== Moving into psychiatry and psychoanalysis ===
In late 1942, Kohut applied to the Chicago Institute for Psychoanalysis, which had been founded by Franz Alexander in 1932, modelling it on the Berlin Psychoanalytic Institute of the 1920s. Kohut was not accepted, and the rejection was decisive. The reason for this remains unclear, but Kohut was not even allowed to begin a didactic analysis. However, he found a clever way around this impasse by going into analysis, beginning in March 1943, with Ruth Eissler, who was also Viennese, and a training and supervising analyst at the institute. Furthermore, Ruth Eissler's husband Kurt R. Eissler, also an analyst, was regarded by August Aichhorn as the most promising future leader of psychoanalysis in America.

In 1944 Kohut decided to leave neurology and move into psychiatry, and in 1947 he was appointed associate professor of psychiatry at the University of Chicago. He got his certification psychiatry in 1949.

In the fall of 1946 he had already been accepted to the Chicago Institute and began immediately on its courses. In the summer of 1947, he was given his first two "control" cases, followed by a third and a fourth case in early 1948. He began to receive patients on a permanent basis in 1949. In October 1950 he took his exams, passed them and became officially an analyst. He became a training and supervising analyst as well as a member of the institute's staff in 1953.

Unlike Franz Alexander, who had sought to shorten analyses, Kohut took as long as it took for the patients to get well in analysis. The agenda came entirely from the patient, whose job it was to say whatever occurred to him or her. He said to one of his patients: "I will do what I can to help you try and understand yourself."

He received his patients at the institute. All his patients are said to have adored him, although in the beginning of his career he had one case with which he failed miserably. Also, during the early years of his career as an analyst, his success was mixed.

Kohut analyzed several people, who were already analysts but who felt they had not benefited as much from their didactic analyses as they had hoped. Some did their training analyses with him. These individuals included Peter Barglow, Michael Franz Basch, George Klumpner and Paul Tolpin.

=== Teacher of psychoanalysis ===
Kohut's work in teaching at the institute became his primary commitment for the rest of his life. He soon became known as the most gifted and creative analyst in the Chicago Institute. Together with Louis Shapiro and Joan Fleming, he rewrote the curriculum of the institute and taught its two-year theory course for a decade. The course was not one of the history of psychoanalysis but a study of "psychoanalytic psychology presented according to historical principles." It was a very Freudian course and contained no hints of where he would later move in his theoretical views. Kohut appeared as a master of metapsychology in these lectures.

He later gave the course over to Philip Seitz, who had been auditing the course and had made notes of it that he had discussed with Kohut and then amended those notes in accordance of those discussions. This collaboration resulted in a joint article, entitled "Concepts and Theories of Psychoanalysis: Relation of Method and Theory" (1963). Seitz published his notes more than three decades later in the form of a book.

Kohut's teaching style is said to have been brilliant, but at the same time it eclipsed the minds of the listeners, and according to Paul Ornstein who took the course, the style was pedagogically a failure. Other commentators have also said that Kohut's brilliance made his students passive and did not encourage independent thinking.

Kohut felt that analysts should be scientists and not technicians who just applied a set of rules to their work. He believed that if the latter were to be the case, the whole field of psychoanalysis would be assimilated to dynamic psychiatry and disappear forever.

=== Administrator in psychoanalysis ===
Kohut was active in the American Psychoanalytic Association from the 1950s. He served on the board of the Journal of the American Psychoanalytic Association, and in a number of committees. But in the 1960s he rose to the top of this organization. First he was its secretary during 1961–62, then president-elect during 1962–63, and finally the president during 1964–65. This further cemented his friendship with Kurt and Ruth Eissler. Kurt Eissler was now one of the leading figures of the New York Psychoanalytic Society & Institute. He also became friends with Heinz Hartmann, who was a very important figure for him.

The last of these positions meant an incredible amount of work, preparing all kinds of meetings and working in a number of committees, as well as putting out all kinds of bush fires within the association. There was, for example, a question of whether analysts should or could express publicly their views about the mental health of Barry Goldwater.

Kohut was at the time very much a representative of traditional Freudian analysis, and he was very careful not to do anything that could have been interpreted as a departure from traditional views. He was also careful about "his reputation as the chosen one to provide leadership for the next generation of psychoanalysts." Much later he jokingly said that in the 1950s and early 1960s he was "Mr. Psychoanalysis."

During this time Kohut became acquainted with many of the major figures in psychoanalysis worldwide. For Kohut, the most important of these figures was Anna Freud. He first met her in 1964 in a meeting in Princeton. After that they were constantly writing to each other.

In the fall of 1966, the University of Chicago gave Anna Freud an honorary doctoral degree. Kohut may have been among the people who initiated this idea, and when she came to Chicago for this event, she stayed with the Kohuts in their apartment. Various activities were arranged for her in Chicago, and for Kohut this visit was a great success.

In the long run Kohut began to feel that his work as the president drained his energies and kept him from developing his own ideas. He was also beginning to have ambivalent feelings about classical analysis. In addition, this position exposed him to people who were self-centered, full of themselves and narcissistic in the worst sense of the word. There was nothing wrong in the science of psychoanalysis, he felt, but the problem was in the people "who are carrying on their work on the basis of these ideas." One could say that this was his higher education in matters related to narcissism.

After leaving his position of the president of The American, Kohut was in 1965 elected vice-president of the International Psychoanalytical Association (IPA). In 1968 he was encouraged by Anna Freud and the Eisslers to run for the presidency of this world-wide organization, as in 1969 it was the Americans' turn to have their representative elected. In the end it turned out that the European members of IPA were beginning to favour Leo Rangell, and thus Kohut would not stand a chance in the election. Anna Freud advised him not offer himself for a defeat, and Kohut withdrew from the race. He then explained this situation to his colleagues by saying that the presidency would have interfered with his creative work, which was a self-invented myth that many colleagues duly bought. Had Kohut been elected, it would have been likely that his first monograph, The Analysis of the Self would have remained his only main contribution to psychoanalytic theory.

=== A writer within psychoanalysis ===
==== Early articles ====
Beginning in 1946, Kohut's friend Siegmund Levarie organized a series of concerts at the University of Chicago. In 1947, the response of the audience to a piece composed by Béla Bartók led him to write an article on some general principles of the psychology of music, which was published in 1950 in the Psychoanalytic Quarterly with the title "On the Enjoyment of Listening to Music." Also in 1947 Kohut began to ponder Thomas Mann's novella Death in Venice. In 1950 he wrote the final version of his thoughts on this novella and presented it as his graduation paper. He decided, however, not to publish it, as Mann was still alive. This article was finally published in 1957, also in the Psychoanalytic Quarterly, two years after Mann's death.

==== On empathy ====
Kohut's first truly scientific contribution was his 1959 article on empathy, entitled "Introspection, Empathy, and Psychoanalysis: An Examination of the Relationship Between Mode of Observation and Theory", which was written for the twenty-fifth anniversary meeting of the Chicago Institute for Psychoanalysis in November 1957, and also presented by Kohut in a psychoanalytic congress in Paris the same year.

This theme actually relates to the very foundation of psychoanalysis, the ability of one human being potentially to gain access to the psychological states of another human being. Interestingly, Sigmund Freud only mentioned this phenomenon in passing in a footnote in one of his articles ("A path leads from identification by way of imitation to empathy, that is, to the comprehension of the mechanism by means of which we are enabled to take up any attitude towards the life of another soul." Kohut now took up the matter and gave a very thorough presentation on this subject, outlining what kind of subject matter can be approached with empathy and what cannot be approached with it. Essentially it means that empathy as a method defines the field that can be observed with its aid.

The basic thesis is that those phenomena that can be approached by means of empathy are called psychological (i.e. relate to the inner life of man), and those that cannot be approached with it, are non-psychological, i.e. physical phenomena and must be approached with our sensory equipment. The approach thus is epistemological.

Despite the warm reception of this paper in Chicago, it was initially turned down by the editors of the Journal of the American Psychoanalytic Association, on the grounds that it presented too basic a challenge to psychoanalytic theory and thus not appropriately psychoanalytic. After an intervention by Max Gitelson, who argued that the journal should not engage itself in ideological censorship, the editorial board reconsidered the paper and eventually published it in 1959.

==== Applied psychoanalysis ====
In 1960 Kohut published in the Journal of the American Psychoanalytic Association an article entitled "Beyond the Bounds of the Basic Rule. Some Recent Contributions to Applied Psychoanalysis." In it he deals with four psychoanalytic biographic works that had recently been published:

- Phyllis Greenacre: Swift and Carroll, A Psychoanalytic Study of Two Lives (1955);
- Edward Hirschmann: Great Men: Psychoanalytic Studies (1955);
- Ida Macalpine and Richard A. Hunter, (ed.): Daniel Paul Schreber, Memoirs of my Nervous Illness (1955);
- Editha Sterba and Richard Sterba: Beethoven and his Nephew. A Psychoanalytic Study of their Relationship (1954).

With regard to using a psychoanalytic approach to works of art and to the lives of artists, Kohut lists three problems:

- The scholar must have a solid grounding in both psychoanalysis and in the field under study.
- The scholar is doing his study outside the traditional psychoanalytic situation, and thus without the benefit of the free association of the analysand. Furthermore, the person under study may have presented a false self in his artistic creations.
- Often efforts in applied analysis are geared toward demonstrating the importance of psychoanalysis itself, and thus these studies have little relevance in the art form which is being studied and leaves itself open to critique of reductionism.

==== On courage ====
The article entitled "On Courage", first published posthumously in 1985, is said to have been the most personal one Kohut wrote, with the exception of the article entitled "The Two Analyses of Mr. Z." He examines here the actions of Franz Jägerstätter, Hans and Sophie Scholl during Hitler's reign in Germany and their willingness to accept death as their only reward. According to Kohut, these people were not crazy, but "they represented a higher and deeper psychological truth that they reached in their actions. Their values gave them no other choice than to refuse to go along with the demands of the Nazi regime.

==== Mitscherlich laudation ====
Kohut spoke and wrote on the post-war psychological problems of the German people when he was invited to speak in Frankfurt am Main in October 1969. He was chosen as the laudator when the Peace Prize of the German Book Trade was awarded to Alexander Mitscherlich, with whom Kohut had become acquainted since the 1950s. Mitscherlich was a medical doctor and a psychoanalyst who had written several well received books on Germany's guilt concerning World War II and the Holocaust. Kohut's main thesis was that Mitscherlich had applied the "analytic principle of individual cure to the therapeutic transformation of a whole population." The audience included the President of the Federal Republic of Germany Gustav Heinemann, and the speech was broadcast live to an estimated audience of 20–30 million people.

== Development of psychoanalytic self psychology ==
In the aftermath of World War II and the Holocaust, Freudian analysis focused on individual guilt and tended not to reflect the new zeitgeist (the emotional interests and needs of people struggling with issues of identity, meaning, ideals, and self-expression). Though he initially tried to remain true to the traditional analytic viewpoint with which he had become associated and viewed the self as separate but coexistent to the ego, Kohut later rejected Freud's structural theory of the id, ego, and superego. He then developed his ideas around what he called the tripartite (three-part) self.

According to Kohut, this three-part self can only develop when the needs of one's "self states", including one's sense of worth and well-being, are met in relationships with others. In contrast to traditional psychoanalysis, which focuses on drives (instinctual motivations of sex and aggression), internal conflicts, and fantasies, self psychology thus placed a great deal of emphasis on the vicissitudes of relationships.

Kohut demonstrated his interest in how we develop our "sense of self" using narcissism as a model. If a person is narcissistic, it will allow him to suppress feelings of low self-esteem. By talking highly of himself, the person can eliminate his sense of worthlessness.

== The self psychology movement ==
=== The beginnings ===
With the exception of such persons as Louis Shapiro and Jerome Kavka, Kohut's peers were not receptive to his new ideas. However, younger analysts, such as Arnold Goldberg, Michael Franz Basch, Paul Ornstein, Anna Ornstein, Paul Tolpin, Marian Tolpin and Ernest Wolf and in the early days John Gedo were interested in his work, and David Marcus was also involved for a while.

Goldberg eventually emerged as the central figure of the group, whereas Paul Ornstein would become the editor of Kohut's collected works. Basch was the most original thinker of the group, but he chose to remain on its fringes.

The group met originally in Kohut's apartment in order to discuss his manuscript of what would become The Analysis of the Self. There were nine such meetings during the spring and early summer of 1969. The manuscript was considered to be difficult by the group, and the comments convinced Kohut that he had to write a new beginning to this book, which then became its first chapter, entitled "Introductory Considerations." In reality this may actually have made the book even more difficult to digest than what it had been prior to the writing of this new first chapter.

== The Analysis of the Self ==
The Analysis of the Self is Heinz Kohut's first monograph, which was published in 1971. It is a treatise on narcissistic personality disorders, and on their psychoanalytic treatment.

Kohut's point of departure is the conceptual separation of the self (German das Selbst) from the ego (German das Ich), as previously elaborated by Heinz Hartmann. Whereas the id, ego and super-ego are instances of the psychic apparatus and thus agencies of the mind, the self is not an agency but still a content and a structure within the psychic apparatus.

The self contains two part structures, the grandiose self and the omnipotent object. These are structures that are found in the development of all human individuals, the healthy as well as the disturbed. They have their own developmental line, which according to Kohut (at the time) was separate from the developmental line of object love. With the narcissistically disturbed people, this development has been thwarted, and the narcissistic structures have been repressed, and thus the narcissistic energies involved with them are not in the disposal of the subject. This results in low self-esteem and many diffuse symptoms, including possible perversions.

In the course of an analysis, these structures become activated and the patient is able to transform them. With some, the grandiose self will be dominant, resulting in what is called a mirror transference, and the patient expects to receive admiration from the analyst. With others, the omnipotent object is dominant, and in this case the patient directs an idealizing transference toward the analyst.

In a normal childhood as well as in analysis, these (re)activated structures enter the process of transmuting internalization, and what follows is that the grandiose self will turn into a set of ambitions and the omnipotent object into a set of ideals.

The various other parties, such as the psychoanalyst, will be called selfobjects, because they are experienced as part of the self. Though dynamic theory tends to place emphasis on childhood development, Kohut believed that the need for such selfobject relationships does not end at childhood but continues throughout all stages of a person's life.

Kohut presented his theory as a parallel to the drive theory and the theory of the Oedipus complex. The idea was to present a theory of a type of patients whose psychological disturbance preceded the emergence of the Oedipus complex. It had traditionally been considered that these patients were too disturbed to be treated psychoanalytically. With Kohut's theory, the psychoanalytical treatment could now be extended to these patients as well.

== Between Analysis and Restoration ==
In 1971, just after the publication of The Analysis of the Self, Kohut was diagnosed with lymphoma or lymphatic cancer. The cancer spread slowly but was mostly kept under control until 1977. Just when he had enjoyed the moment of greatest glory, he was confronted by a disease that was totally out of his control. Due to his disease he would turn down most invitations to speak, including a chance to speak at Harvard University, and to deliver the Freud lecture in Vienna. He also gave up his talks at Princeton University, but he did speak regularly at the University of Cincinnati, which bestowed upon him an honorary degree in November 1973.

In 1973, a banquet was arranged for Kohut's 60th birthday, which turned into a conference on self psychology. Among the participants were such people as Alexander Mitscherlich from Frankfurt, Paul Parin from Zürich and Jacques Palaci from Paris, as well as many psychoanalysts from the United States, including e.g. René Spitz from Denver. The distinguished historian of Vienna, Carl Schorske from Princeton was a featured speaker. The high point was a banquet, with John Gedo as the speaker. Kohut himself would respond to Gedo's speech by delivering a speech which he had spent months preparing and which he had memorized and presented as a spontaneous response to Gedo. It was later published with the title "The Future of Psychoanalysis."

In Strozier's view, Kohut's illness forced him to think for himself and resulted in several breakthroughs in his career as a theorist of psychoanalysis. He came to the conclusion that many analysts had been shaming their analysands in the guise of offering interpretations, that neurotic pathology was only a cover for narcissistic problems, that idealization was not a form of defense, that everyone needs mirroring, and that rage is a byproduct of the disintegration of the self. He broke free from classical metapsychology and formed his own, general psychology, with the self as its center. This would be self-psychology in its broad sense. The approaching death forced Kohut to think with his own brains. He knew that he was shaking psychoanalysis in its core, and he was afraid he would not have the time to finish his revolutionary job. By and large he stopped reading psychoanalytic literature, saying either that others say things better than him or that they write things that are no good. He devoted his time to his own writing, to listening to music and reading about the arts.

=== On narcissistic rage ===
In his book The Analysis of the Self, Kohut states that the topic of narcissistic rage will be taken up separately. This he did in the article Thoughts on Narcissism and Narcissistic Rage, which he published in 1972. In the article, Kohut wrote:

Narcissistic rage occurs in many forms; they all share, however, a specific psychological flavor which gives them a distinct position within the wide realm of human aggressions. The need for revenge, for righting a wrong, for undoing a hurt by whatever means, and a deeply anchored, unrelenting compulsion in the pursuit of all these aims which gives no rest to those who have suffered a narcissistic injury—these are features which are characteristic for the phenomenon of narcissistic rage in all its forms and which set it apart from other kinds of aggression.

The article was possibly a miscalculation, because he ought to have written on this topic in one of his monographs, which were more widely read than his articles. Due to this fact, criticism was leveled at him, saying that his views on aggression and rage were inadequate and naive and superficial at best.

For Freud, rage was a biological given that one needed to learn to curb. For him, wars, intolerance and repression were caused by a regression to a more primitive psychological level of the drives, from which our egos are separated only by a thin layer of civilization. For Kohut, neither the history nor the human soul could be explained by such reductionistic formulae. For him, rage was a byproduct of the disintegration of the self. For him, the rage one feels is in no proportion to the slight that has caused it. A person filled with rage does not feel any empathy towards the person or persons that have caused the slight.

According to Kohut,

Human aggression is most dangerous when it is attached to the two great absolutarian psychological constellations: the grandiose self and the archaic omnipotent object. And the most gruesome human destructiveness is encountered, not in the form of wild, regressive, and primitive behavior, but in the form of orderly and organized activities in which the perpetrators' destructiveness is alloyed with absolute conviction about their greatness and with their devotion to archaic omnipotent figures.

Mature aggression, however, is goal oriented and limited in scope. Rage, on the other hand, consists of a desperate need for revenge, an unforgiving fury for righting a wrong, when one's self has disintegrated due to an experienced slight.

Kohut published another important article in 1976, entitled "Creativeness, Charisma, Group Psychology. Reflections on the Self-Analysis of Freud". He starts by making some comments on the psychoanalytic community, and then moves to Freud's self-analysis and his relationship with Wilhelm Fließ, but in the end he writes about charismatic and messianic personalities. His examples of these are Hitler and Churchill.

The key concept in this article is the group self, which he puts forward in a tentative manner, as a "potentially fruitful concept".

Charismatic and messianic personalities evolve from childhood situations, in which the child has been given empathy at first, but then the mirroring and idealized figures have caused them "abrupt and unpredictable frustrations". In result, the child has taken upon himself to perform the tasks of the selfobjects, developing a superempathy towards himself, while feeling next to no empathy and plenty of fury towards the outside world. He has begun to live in a decidedly archaic world filled with rage at the torment he suffered from his early selfobjects. He feels perfect himself, and asserts his perfection with self-righteousness, and demands control over others who would then serve as vicarious regulators of self-esteem. These people have special capabilities for sensitivity,

[t]hey seem to combine an absolute certainty concerning the power of their selves and an absolute conviction concerning the validity of their ideals with an equally absolute lack of empathic understanding for large segments of feelings, needs, and rights of other human beings and for the values cherished by them. They understand the environment in which they live only as an extension of their own narcissistic universe. They understand others only insofar—but here with the keenest empathy!—as they can serve as tools toward their own narcissistic ends or insofar as they interfere with their own purposes. It is not likely that depth psychology will find effective means to influence such persons, at least not those who present themselves in the arena of history. But the historian-analyst and the analyst-historian may well be able to make contributions that will not only increase our psychological grasp of such personalities, but will also provide answers to two interrelated questions: How do the characteristic psychological features of the messianic and charismatic person dovetail with the widespread yearning for archaic omnipotent figures? And what are the specific historical circumstances that tend to increase this yearning?

=== The group begins anew ===
After the publication of The Analysis of the Self the friendship between Kohut, on the one hand, and Anna Freud and Kurt Eissler, on the other, began to cool off slowly, as the latter began to understand the implications of Kohut's work. Among Kohut peers, a notable exceptions to this pattern were René Spitz and Jerome Kavka. Most of his old friends shunned him. For example, Martin Stein from New York lambasted later Kohut's 1977 book in the pages of the Journal of the American Psychoanalytic Association. Kohut was even voted out of the board of the Chicago Institute for Psychoanalysis.

In 1973, Kohut assembled again the group of his younger followers, inactive since 1969, to write what would be published as the so-called Casebook, officially The Psychology of the Self: A Casebook. Invited were John Gedo, Arnold Goldberg, Michael Franz Basch, Paul Ornstein and Anna Ornstein, Paul Tolpin and Marian Tolpin, Ernest Wolf, David Marcus and Meyer Gunther. However, Gedo soon left the group.

The idea was that Kohut's disciples were to write case histories of analyses which Kohut had supervised, and that Kohut would supply the book with his comments. The book was edited by Arnold Goldberg, but John Gedo left the group in 1974, and Kohut himself soon left the project as well, although it is said on the cover that it was "written with the collaboration of Heinz Kohut". Kohut then assembled a smaller group which would meet in private homes. People from outside Chicago were also invited. This group would in 1978 evolve into annual conferences on self-psychology.

== The Restoration of the Self ==
The title of Kohut's second monograph is The Restoration of the Self. It was published in 1977.

Kohut started to write this book in Carmel, California, during his summer vacation in 1974. By February 1975, he had written ca. "three quarters" of it, and by June he said it was soon to be completed. Its working title was a rather awful one, The Rehabilitation of the Self: Thoughts About the Termination of Analyses and the Concept of Cure. After the summer of 1975, he would say that the book was already finished. By October 1975, he had arrived at the final title, The Restoration of the Self. However, he carried on working on this book for the next year, and during this time he abandoned the awkward subtitle. The book was published in the spring of 1977, and it was an immediate success: by June it had sold 11.500 copies.

The Restoration of the Self is the best-written and most accessible book by Kohut. He tried as best he could to avoid the language of the drive theory as well as psychoanalytic metapsychology, which made his first book, The Analysis of the Self, such a difficult read. Kohut had decided to make his new book more accessible, and he worked together with Natalie Altman, his publisher's editor, who would read and comment on his text. This work proceeded throughout the year 1976.

Restoration turned out to be Kohut's breakthrough, the work in which he steps up from behind the curtain. He had abandoned the drive theory and its language, and he was never again to return to the mainstream Freudian psychoanalysis. Nearly all principles of psychoanalytic technique, inherited from Freud, were now in the line of fire: the drive theory, the central role of infantile sexuality, the Oedipus complex, the close relationship between conflicts, defenses and resistances, and working through. Kohut makes a clear break from Freudian thinking.

Kohut says that The Restoration of the Self "is not a technical or theoretical monograph written detachedly by an author who has achieved mastery in a stable and established field of knowledge". On the contrary, "it is a report of an analyst's attempt to struggle toward greater clarity in an area that, despite years of conscientious effort, he was unable to understand within the available psychoanalytic framework." He says he is "floundering in a morass of conflicting, poorly based, and often vague theoretical speculation," and that the only way forward was to go "back to the direct observation of clinical phenomena and the construction of new formulations that would accommodate my observations." He says he had tried to integrate his thoughts with those of previous thinkers, but this

would have entangled me in a thicket of similar, overlapping, or identical terms and concepts which, however, did not carry the same meaning and were not employed as a part of the same conceptual context.

Kohut bypasses most authors in the field of psychoanalysis, but not Freud. He is in constant dialogue with him, and often finds himself contradicting him: Freud is no longer a relevant thinker from the point of view of history, or conceptually, therapeutically of philosophically.

Kohut writes about the Tragic Man (his view of man) and the Guilty Man (Freud's view of man), and Freud seems almost to suffocate Kohut. He struggles to breathe, and the "only salvation is that the struggle to breathe forces Kohut to clarify his ideas in ways that changed the field forever."

For Freud the essence of psychoanalysis was that "neurotic misery would be transformed into common unhappiness", and the unconscious would have to become conscious, repression barriers would have to be overcome, and light would have to penetrate the cauldron of desires, and the truth would have to be seen face to face, no matter what would follow from it. For Freud, Kohut's idea that the psyche could be transformed into something new was "completely alien and exceedingly naïve."

"In Freud's early work with hysteria, Kohut argues, he probably cured mostly through suggestion and the mighty force of his belief in the rightness of his views," writes Strozier.

Healing was not Freud's point.

"Freud's values were not primarily health values", Kohut wrote. However, in Kohut's view, "it is to Freud's eternal credit that he created depth psychology."

Kohut wanted to fundamentally question Freudian drive theory, and he understood that at the same time he would have to question the goals of Freudian analysts: "the mastering of infantile drives through more adaptive sublimations, making unconscious material conscious, and expanding and liberating the realm of the ego." Very few of Kohut's contemporaries understood that these goals originated from the drive theory. Challenging this paradigm was equal to an attack at the core of psychoanalysis.

== "The Two Analyses of Mr. Z." ==
In 1977, at the age of 64, Kohut wrote an article that was to be entitled "The Two Analyses of Mr. Z." This text was first intended for the German edition of The Restoration of the Self, where it would replace the case of "Mr. X." The story is autobiographical, although Kohut himself never admitted this to anyone.

"Mr. X." had originally been a case history by Anita Eckstaedt, a German analyst. Mr. X. was a German student of theology analyzed by Eckstaedt, but Kohut had disguised him as a young American man, who had wanted to join the Peace Corps but had been turned down. He had supposedly been analyzed in the US by Kohut's younger colleague in supervision with him.

When the German edition of Restoration (Die Heilung des Selbst) was in preparation, Eckstaedt wrote to Kohut with two demands: (1) the case needed to be disguised further, and (2) Eckstaedt wanted to have more credit for the case. These demands were clearly mutually exclusive, resulting in a dilemma, which Kohut solved by writing up the case of Mr. Z., which replaced the case of Mr. X. in the German edition, which came out in 1979. Kohut later published the case in English in the International Journal of Psycho-Analysis, carefully edited by Natalie Altman.

Mr. Z. is presented as a patient that Kohut had analyzed twice for four years, first within a Freudian framework, and after an interval of five years, within Kohut's new framework of self psychology. Both analyses lasted for five years.

Kohut did not discuss the case of Mr. Z. with his wife Elizabeth or his son Thomas, and he did not read out the article to them, something which he usually did with all his works. Elizabeth and Thomas did not really read the article until after Kohut's death.

The important facts of the life of Mr. Z., which coincide with Kohut's life, are the following: He was an only child, his mother had similar character traits to Else Kohut, including her interest in painting and poetry. His father was away for a few years, before the son was five years of age, the story of a skiing vacation and the hotel there is similar to Kohut's own life. The novel Uncle Tom's Cabin was read to him at an early age. There is a camp counselor that resembles a tutor that Kohut had had at an early age. The parents were distant with each other. However, some details are slightly changed. The father of Mr. Z. sits in with a small band and sings with them, when in reality Felix Kohut was an accomplished pianist.

There is no conclusive answer to whether Kohut was Mr. Z., but Strozier makes a strong case for it, as does Cocks. Strozier says that with such a prominent case for self psychology, it would have been highly likely that Kohut would not have used it until 1977, when he had already written two books on his theory.

== Personal life ==
In 1948 Kohut presented case material in a seminar at the Chicago Institute, and one of the listeners was a social worker from the institute, Elizabeth Meyer. They fell immediately in love. For Kohut the decisive thing about her, as he wrote to Aichhorn, was her connection to Vienna. Meyer had spent some time in this city, had gone to analysis as Jenny Waelder's patient and had also been Aichhorn's student. They got married on October 9, 1948. They had one son, Thomas August Kohut (his first name being a reference to Mann, the middle name a reference to Aichhorn), born in 1950. After Thomas was born, Elizabeth Kohut gave up her day job at the institute, returning to work only in 1961 to work half days. The Kohuts also adopted informally the son of a colleague who had died and whose mother had committed suicide.

Thomas Kohut studied at the University of Chicago Lab School and eventually went through psychoanalytic training, but then decided to make a career as a historian and a psychohistorian.

Although Kohut enjoyed holiday trips to Europe, often in connection with psychoanalytic events, his favorite place for holidays was the town of Carmel in California. Beginning in 1951, the Kohuts usually spent two months there, from mid-July to mid-September. This way he could escape the hot and humid summers of Chicago, which caused him various problems due to his allergies. They always rented the same house, which was owned by an English couple that wanted to spend the summers in their native country. This house in Carmel is where Kohut did most of his writing.

In addition to the holidays in Carmel, the Kohuts also had a country house in Wisconsin, where they could spend weekends, often during the winter.

Kohut was psychologically unable to visit his native Vienna until 1957. He then visited his maternal uncle Hans Lampl, who had got back his old position as an executive of the Leykam-Josefsthal A.G. paper company. Lampl treated the Kohuts to a dinner, and used his position of influence to give a special gift to his nephew's son.

Kohut's mother Else also lived in Chicago, not far from Kohut's apartment. In the 1950s and 1960s she visited the Kohut family regularly for dinners and major holidays. She is said to have been the only person who could really get under Kohut's skin. Apparently no one in the family liked her. She would be pushy and aggressive, speak directly at other people's faces and poke people with her finger.

After 1965, when Else was getting close to 75 years of age, she began to "demonstrate a set of circumscribed paranoid delusions." This, together with her declining health, made it necessary for Kohut to place his mother in a nursing home in 1970. For Kohut, the fact that his mother had turned out to be crazy, was a liberating experience. He now realized that his whole life had been spent trying to escape from his latently psychotic mother. He could now also understand why his father had been absent in his childhood. Strozier argues that Else's craziness liberated Kohut's creativity and made it possible for him to study the deeper meanings of highly regressed states and thus to write his first and most important monograph, The Analysis of the Self. Else Kohut died in late 1972.

=== Political views ===
Kohut was not a political person. According to his biographer Strozier, Kohut barely noticed the Nazis when they took over Vienna.

In the United States, he was viewed as a modern liberal, and he was for state control of gun ownership. He considered the Vietnam War to be immoral and stupid, yet he did not initially understand his son's anti-war attitude. Thomas Kohut was at the time studying at Oberlin College, which had a long history in opposing all kinds of social injustice, beginning with opposition to slavery and being an important station in the Underground Railroad. Eventually, Kohut came to see reason in his son's views, and their anti-Nixon sentiments presumably gave them some common ground.

== Death ==
In the final week of his life, knowing that his time was at an end, Kohut spent as much time as he could with his family and friends. He fell into a coma on the evening of October 7, 1981, and died of cancer in Chicago on the morning of October 8.

== Publications ==
- The Analysis of the Self: A Systematic Approach to the Psychoanalytic Treatment of Narcissistic Personality Disorders (1971). International Universities Press, New York. ISBN 0-8236-8002-9.
- The Restoration of the Self (1977). International Universities Press, New York. ISBN 0-8236-5810-4.
- The Search for the Self: Selected Writings of Heinz Kohut 1950–1978, Vol. 1 (1978). Edited by Paul Ornstein. International Universities Press, New York. ISBN 0-8236-6015-X.
- The Search for the Self: Selected Writings of Heinz Kohut 1950–1978, Vol. 2 (1978). Edited by Paul Ornstein. International Universities Press, New York. ISBN 0-8236-6016-8.

=== Posthumously ===
- How Does Analysis Cure? (1984). Ed. Arnold Goldberg with Paul E. Stepansky. University of Chicago Press, Chicago and London. ISBN 978-0-226-45034-6
- Self Psychology and the Humanities (1985). Ed. by Charles B. Strozier. W. W. Norton & Co., New York & London. ISBN 0-393-70000-3.
- The Kohut Seminars on Self Psychology and Psychotherapy With Adolescents and Young Adults (1987). Edited by Miriam Elson. W. W. Norton & Co., New York & London. ISBN 978-0-393-70041-1.
- The Search for the Self: Selected Writings of Heinz Kohut: 1978–1981. Vol. 3 (1990). Edited by Paul Ornstein. International Universities Press, Madison, Connecticut. ISBN 0-8236-6017-6.
- The Search for the Self: Selected Writings of Heinz Kohut: 1978–1981. Vol. 4 (1991). Edited by Paul Ornstein. International Universities Press, Madison, Connecticut. ISBN 0-8236-6018-4.
- The Curve of Life: Correspondence of Heinz Kohut, 1923–1981 (1994). Edited by Geoffrey Cocks. University of Chicago Press, Chicago and London. ISBN 0-226-11170-9.
- The Chicago Institute Lectures (1996). Edited Paul Tolpin and, Marian Tolpin. The Analytic Press, Hillsdale, N.J. ISBN 0-88163-116-7.

=== In collaboration with Heinz Kohut ===
- Arnold Goldberg (ed.): The Psychology of the Self: A Casebook. (1978) International Universities Press, New York. ISBN 0-8236-5582-2.
- Philip F. D. Rubovits-Seitz: Kohut's Freudian Vision (1999). The Analytic Press, Hillsdale, N.J. and London. ISBN 0-88163-284-8.

== See also ==
- Narcissism
- Healthy narcissism
- Narcissistic personality disorder
- Narcissistic rage
- True self and false self: Kohut

== Sources ==
- Cocks, Geoffrey (1994). Introduction in The Curve of Life. Correspondence of Heinz Kohut 1923–1981. Chicago and London: The University of Chicago Press. pp. 1–31. ISBN 0-226-11170-9.
- Siegel, Allen M. (1996). Heinz Kohut and the Psychology of the Self. London/New York: Routledge. ISBN 0-415-08638-8.
- Strozier, Charles B (2004). Heinz Kohut: The Making of a Psychoanalyst. New York: Farrar, Straus and Giroux. ISBN 0-374-16880-6.
