= Arnold Goldberg =

American psychiatrist and psychoanalyst (1929–2020)

Arnold I. Goldberg
- Born: May 21, 1929
- Died: September 24, 2020 (aged 91)
- Occupation: American psychoanalyst

Arnold Goldberg (May 21, 1929 – September 24, 2020) was an American psychiatrist and psychoanalyst.

Goldberg was the Cynthia Oudejans Harris Professor of Psychiatry at the Rush Medical School, Chicago, and a supervising and training analyst at the Chicago Institute for Psychoanalysis, where he did his psychoanalytic training.

The author of Moral Stealth: How "Correct Behavior" Insinuates Itself into Psychotherapeutic Practice (2007), Misunderstanding Freud (2004), Being of Two Minds: The Vertical Split in Psychoanalysis and Psychotherapy (1999), The Problem of Perversion: The View from Self Psychology (1995), A Fresh Look at Psychoanalysis: The View From Self Psychology (1992), The Prisonhouse of Psychoanalysis (1990); (with John Gedo) Models of the Mind: A Psychoanalytic Theory (1976), he was also the editor of the annual series, Progress in Self-Psychology, now in its 24th year.

Many of Goldberg's publications were in the realm of self psychology, expanding and clarifying the ideas of Heinz Kohut.

== See also ==
- Heinz Kohut
- Self psychology
