= The Restoration of the Self =

1977 work by Heinz Kohut

The Restoration of the Self is the second monograph by Austrian-American psychoanalyst Heinz Kohut. It was written in 1974–76 and published in 1977, and it marked his breakthrough as an author. It is written in a more accessible style than his first monograph, The Analysis of the Self (1971). After its release, Restoration sold 11,500 copies in the United States in less than two months.

== Contents ==
In this book, Kohut makes his position explicit. As he wrote to John Gedo, "I think that people will have an easier time seeing my position in the open, rather than having to guess it through a veil of allusions."

The book is largely a dialogue with Freud, and Kohut ignores most other writers. According to Strozier, Kohut "remains in constant dialogue—and disagreement—with the master" [i.e. Freud]. Restoration is in this sense a meditation on Freud, even though, Kohut argues, he is no longer a relevant thinker, neither historically, conceptually, therapeutically or philosophically. "Freud's values were not primarily health values," Kohut wrote.

Despite his admiration of Kohut's work, Strozier has some critical words on what Kohut writes:

At times Kohut's engagement with Freud is tedious and perversely dialectic. Criteria for terminating analysis, for example, compete too simply with those of a supposedly outworn drive psychology. The idea of defensive and compensatory structures too neatly replaces the old notions of ego defense against impulses. The new model of the self seems brittle as it struggles to silence echoes of what Freud called his structural model. And Tragic Man [...] rather simplistically opposes Guilty Man.

Strozier says that Freud almost suffocates Kohut, and that the only salvation for him is to "clarify his ideas in ways that changed the field forever."

Concerning dreams, Kohut introduces the concept of a self state dream, of which he had reported earlier, though not with this term. These dreams often have to do with the fear of psychological disintegration, and any deeper attempt at analyzing them does not yield any significant results. Freudian concepts of condensation, displacement, symbolization and secondary revision are not relevant when analyzing these dreams. The fear of psychological disintegration is the bedrock, beyond which these dreams can not be analyzed.

The book consists of seven chapters, in a parallel of Freud's The Interpretation of Dreams. In a review written by Martin Stein, it is said that "Sooner or later, all that we know as psychoanalysis comes under fire" [in this book]. This includes "drive theory, the central role of infantile sexuality, the Oedipus complex, the relationship between conflict, defense and resistance, working things through, "and almost all the principles of technique handed down by Freud."

The book places the self in the center of the psychological experience and the psychoanalytical theory. Yet, Kohut argues that we must simultaneously be able to treat the self as a content of the mental apparatus. In saying this, Kohut retains the Freudian structural model of the mind, with the self as a content within this structure, while also at the same time, from another perspective, discarding it.

== Translations ==
- German: Die Heilung des Selbst, Suhrkamp Verlag, Frankfurt am Main, 1979.
- Swedish: Att bygga up självet. Natur och Kultur, 1986.
- Portuguese: A restauração do self. Tr. Carlos Alberto Pavanelli. Rio de Janeiro: Imago Editora, 1988.
- Danish: Selvets psykologi [oversatt til dansk av Mette Andersen]. København: Hans Reitzels forlag, 1990.
- Norwegian: Selvets psykologi [oversatt til dansk av Mette Andersen med språklig og faglig revidering av Marie-Louise Hammer] Oslo: Universitetsforlaget, 1990.
- Spanish: La restauración del sí-mismo. Tr. Noemí Rosenblatt. Barcelona: Paidós Ibérica, 2001.
- Russian: Восстановление самости. Пер. с англ. А. М. Боковикова. Imprint М., Когито-центр 2002.

== Sources ==
- Cocks, Geoffrey, ed. (1994). Introduction in The Curve of Life. Correspondence of Heinz Kohut 1923–1981. Chicago and London: The University of Chicago Press. ISBN 0-226-11170-9.
- Kohut, Heinz: The Analysis of the Self: A Systematic Approach to the Psychoanalytic Treatment of Narcissistic Personality Disorders (1971). International Universities Press, New York. ISBN 0-8236-8002-9.
- Kohut, Heinz (1977). The Restoration of the Self. New York: International Universities Press. ISBN 0-8236-5810-4.
- Strozier, Charles B. (2001). Heinz Kohut: The Making of a Psychoanalyst. New York: Farrar, Straus and Giroux. ISBN 0-374-16880-6.
