= Michael D. Robbins =

American author, psychoanalyst, and former professor of Psychiatry

- Education: Amherst College, Columbia University College of Physicians & Surgeons, M.D.
- Occupations: Author, Psychoanalyst

Michael D. Robbins is an American author, psychoanalyst, and former professor of psychiatry at Harvard Medical School and the University of California, San Francisco. His psychoanalytic research has focused on how the mind works in western and non-western cultures, particularly with regard to schizophrenia and other psychoses, language, creativity, conscious and unconscious mental processes.

== Biography ==
Robbins graduated from Amherst College Summa Cum Laude in 1905. He received his medical degree at Columbia University College of Physicians & Surgeons. Robbins completed his residency at Massachusetts Mental Health Center and an internship at the University of Rochester Medical School. Additionally, he graduated from and is a member of the Boston Psychoanalytic Society and Institute.

Robbins joined Harvard Medical School where he became an assistant professor and later a clinical professor of psychiatry. He was attending psychiatrist at McLean Hospital in Belmont, Massachusetts where he was in charge of wards and then became director of the admissions and brief treatment service. He later became clinical professor of psychiatry at the University of California, San Francisco and was on the faculty of the Psychoanalytic Institute of Northern California.

He is a member of the International Psychoanalytic Association, and the American Psychoanalytic Association. He was on the board of directors of the American Academy of Psychoanalysis and the International Society for the Psychological Treatment of Schizophrenia and Other Psychoses (ISPS).

In 1983, Robbins received the Felix and Helene Deutsch Prize presented by the Boston Psychoanalytic Society and Institute for his paper, "Toward a New Mind Model for the Primitive Personalities."

== Selected bibliography ==
=== Books ===
- Michael D. Robbins (July 30, 1993). Experiences of Schizophrenia: An Integration of the Personal, Scientific, and Therapeutic. Guilford Press. ISBN 9780898629972.
- Michael Robbins (September 25, 1996). Conceiving of Personality. Yale University Press. ISBN 9780300064223.
- Michael Robbins (May 19, 2011). The Primordial Mind in Health and Illness: A Cross-Cultural Perspective. Routledge. ISBN 9780415454612.
- Michael Robbins (May 5, 2018). Consciousness, Language, and Self: Psychoanalytic Explorations of the Dual Nature of Mind. Routledge. ISBN 9781138487635.
- Michael Robbins (April 2019). Psychoanalysis Meets Psychosis: Attachment, Separation, and the Undifferentiated Unintegrated Mind. Routledge. ISBN 978-0-367-19115-3.

Michael Robbins ( September 8, 2023). What Makes Humans Unique: Evolution and the Two Structures of Mind. Routledge. ISBN 1032564911 Michael Robbins (2023). The Human Difference: Evolution, Civilization – and Destruction. Routledge. ISBN 1032569441 Michael Robbins (June 12, 2023). Traveling On: Fifty Years of Poetry and Sculpture. IP books. ISBN 1956864466

=== Book chapters ===
- M. Robbins (1993). "Disturbances of affect representation in primitive personalities". J. Gedo & A. Wilson, eds., Hierarchical Conceptions in Psychoanalysis. Guilford Press. pp. 235–262.
- M. Robbins (1993). "The psychopathological spectrum and the hierarchical model". J. Gedo & A. Wilson, eds., Hierarchical Concepts in Psychoanalysis. Guilford Press. pp. 284–308.
- M. Robbins (1994). "A Fairbairnian object relations perspective on self psychology". J. Grotstein & D. Rinsley,(Eds), Fairbairn and the Origin of Object Relations. Guilford Press. pp. 302–317.
- M. Robbins (1996). "Nature, nurture and core gender identity". Richards, A. & Tyson, P., (Eds.), The Psychology of Women: Psychoanalytic Perspectives. International Universities Press. pp. 93–117.
- M. Robbins (2003). "Le langage dans la schizophrenie et le monde du delire". L' Annee Psychoanalytique Internationale 2003. International Journal of Psycho-Analysis. pp. 63–90.
- M. Robbins (2013). "Affect and Psychosis". Gumley, A., Gillham, A., Taylor, K., & Schwannauer, M. (Eds), Psychosis and Emotion: The role of emotions in understanding psychosis, therapy and recovery. Routledge.
- M. Robbins (2015). "The "royal road" – to what?". The Annual of Psychoanalysis. Vol. 38. pp. 196–214.
- M. Robbins (2016). "The successful psychoanalytic therapy of a chronic paranoid schizophrenic woman". Lombardi, R., Rinaldi, L., & Thanopulos, S. (Eds), Psicoanalisi Della Psicosi: Prospettive Attuali. Raffello Cortina.

=== Articles ===
- M. Robbins (1980). "Current controversy in object relations theory as outgrowth of a schism between Klein and Fairbairn". International Journal of Psycho-Analysis. 61: 541–557.
- M. Robbins (1983). "Toward a new mind model for the primitive personalities". International Journal of Psycho-Analysis. 64: 127–148. PMID 6874231.
- Michael Robbins (April 1, 1992). "Psychoanalytic and Biological Approaches to Mental Illness: Schizophrenia". Journal of the American Psychoanalytic Association. 40 (2): 425–454. doi:10.1177/000306519204000206. PMID 1593079. S2CID 23338245.
- Michael Robbins (June 1, 1996). "The Mental Organization of Primitive Personalities and its Treatment Implications". Journal of the American Psychoanalytic Association. 44 (3): 755–784. doi:10.1177/000306519604400305. PMID 8892187. S2CID 37303434.
- M. Robbins (2002). "Psychoanalysis and schizophrenia". Journal of the American Psychoanalytic Association. 50 (1): 310–314. doi:10.1177/00030651020500010602. PMID 12018871. S2CID 220986397.
- Michael Robbins (April 2002). "The Language of Schizophrenia and the World of Delusion". The International Journal of Psychoanalysis. 83 (2): 383–405. doi:10.1516/ATTU-2M15-HX4F-5R2V. PMID 12028698. S2CID 26232831.
- Michael Robbins (June 1, 2004). "Another Look At Dreaming: Disentangling Freud's Primary and Secondary Process Theories". Journal of the American Psychoanalytic Association. 52 (2): 355–384. doi:10.1177/00030651040520021201. PMID 15222432. S2CID 17735085.
- M. Robbins (2008). "Primary mental expression: Freud, Klein and beyond". Journal of the American Psychoanalytic Association. 56 (1): 177–202. doi:10.1177/0003065108315691. PMID 18430707. S2CID 28992361.
- M Robbins (December 12, 2012). "The Successful Psychoanalytic Therapy of a Schizophrenic Woman". Psychodynamic Psychiatry. 40 (4): 575–608. doi:10.1521/pdps.2012.40.4.575. PMID 23216397.
- M Robbins (2015). "The “royal road” – to what?" The Annual of Psychoanalysis. 38: 196-214.
- M.Robbins (2018). "The Primary Process: Freud's Profound but Neglected Contribution to the Psychology of Consciousness". Psychoanalytic Inquiry. 38: 186–197.
