= Philip Holzman =

American psychologist (1922–2004)

Philip Holzman (1922–2004) was the Esther and Sidney R. Rabb Professor of Psychology Emeritus at Harvard University and one of the world’s preeminent scientists in schizophrenia research. His landmark studies of oculomotor function documented the presence of abnormal smooth pursuit eye movements in individuals with schizophrenia (Holzman, Proctor and Hughes, 1973) and their clinically unaffected biological relatives (Holzman et al., 1974). He was one of the first to investigate the genetic basis of schizophrenia. Another key contribution to the study of schizophrenia was his work on language and thought disorder in individuals with schizophrenia (Holzman, Shenton and Solovay, 1986). He also discovered the presence of an active short-term memory deficit (known as working memory) in people with schizophrenia and their biological relatives (Park and Holzman, 1991; Park, Holzman and Goldman-Rakic, 1995).

== Early life and education ==
Philip Seidman Holzman was born on May 2, 1922, in Manhattan. He graduated from the College of the City of New York in 1943. After his military service, he embarked on graduate studies in psychology. In 1952, he received his Ph.D. from the University of Kansas.

== Research career ==
Dr. Holzman was an instructor at the Menninger Foundation School of Clinical Psychology before joining the Topeka Psychoanalytic Institute, where he was a supervisory psychoanalyst from 1963 to 1968. He was then appointed a professor in the University of Chicago's department of psychiatry, a position he held until moving to Harvard in 1977.

At Harvard, Dr. Holzman was the Esther and Sidney R. Rabb Professor of Psychology between 1977 and 2002. In 2002, he accepted Emeritus status from the University. He was also the director of the Psychology Research Laboratory at McLean Hospital in Belmont, Massachusetts from 1977 until 2004 [1]. At McLean, he was a member of the Mailman Research Center, founded by Seymour Kety.

"During 22 years at the Menninger Foundation, he co-authored a book on psychoanalytic technique, validated a Rorschach determinant as a predictor of risk for suicide, and wrote extensively on clinical issues—process in psychotherapy supervision, therapeutic elements of the hospital milieu, and the psychodynamic meaning of procrastination, to mention just a few. He was one of a handful of clinical psychologists to receive full psychoanalytic training within the psychoanalytic establishment. He became a training and supervising analyst in Topeka and continued to practice and teach in Chicago and Boston. His earliest mentors were Gardner Murphy, Karl Menninger, David Rapaport, Merton Gill, and Roy Schafer. During the same period, he embarked on an ambitious program of research with George Klein and Herbert Schlesinger on the effects of motivation, drive regulation, memory, defenses, and reality constraints on different styles of regulating cognition. From this body of work, terms such as cognitive controls, cognitive styles, and perceptual or cognitive attitudes became part of the lexicon of general psychology." [1] In the 1960s, he also conducted several studies on the causes of voice confrontation.

Thus, he had established two entirely distinct, and very distinguished careers even before he began his research in schizophrenia. He was originally trained as a clinical psychologist immersed in psychoanalysis, but he also established a successful and influential research program that examined individual differences in perceptual organization using empirical methods. These two distinct lines of work representing the subjective experiences of the individual and the empirical, objective framework of experimental psychopathology co-existed throughout his career. Throughout his tenure at Harvard, he continued to train and supervise at the Boston Psychoanalytic Society and Institute.

He was an advisor and mentor, having trained generations of research scientists, academics and clinicians throughout his career, including Dr. Deborah Levy (1950-2020), the former director of the Psychology Laboratory at McLean Hospital, Prof. Martha Shenton at Harvard Medical School, Dr. Smadar Levin (1946-1989), Dr. Margie Solovay, Dr. Deborah Yurgulun-Todd at University of Utah, Prof. Sohee Park at Vanderbilt University, Prof. Anne Sereno at Purdue University, Prof. Diane Gooding at the University of Wisconsin, Prof. Gillian O'Driscoll at McGill University, Prof. Jeanyung Chey at Seoul National University, Prof. Dara Manoach at Mass. General, Dr. Donna Jenkins and Dr. Yue Chen (1959-2017) among many others.

== Awards and recognition ==
Dr. Holzman was a former president of the Society for Research in Psychopathology, a society he co-founded. He was elected a fellow of the American Association for the Advancement of Science in 1979 and the American Academy of Arts and Sciences in 1982. Among many honors, Dr. Holzman received the American Psychological Foundation's Alexander Gralnick research award in 2001. In 1997, the International Congress on Schizophrenia Research recognized him with its Warren award for lifetime achievement in research.

== Personal life and death ==
He was married to Ann for 58 years, and had three children. Philip Holzman died of a stroke in Boston on 1 June 2004.

== Selected bibliography ==
- Holzman, Philip, "Personality," Encyclopaedia Britannica.
- Menninger, Karl Augustus; Holzman, Philip S. (1973), Theory of psychoanalytic technique, Basic Books, OCLC 1061614095
- Holzman, Philip S. (1995), Psychoanalysis and Psychopathology, The Master Work Series, Northvale, NJ: Jason Aronson, OCLC 611035388
- Johnston, Mary Hollis; Holzman, Philip S. (1 October 1979), Assessing Schizophrenic Thinking: A Clinical and Research Instrument for Measuring Thought Disorder, Jossey-Bass Social and Behavioral Science Series, San Francisco, CA: Jossey Bass, ISBN 978-0-8357-4928-2, OCLC 917223979
- Holzman, Philip S.; Matthysse, Steven (2017). "The Genetics of Schizophrenia: A Review". Psychological Science. 1 (5): 279–286. doi:10.1111/j.1467-9280.1990.tb00215.x. ISSN 0956-7976. S2CID 144375262.
- Holzman, Philip S. (1992). "Behavioral markers of schizophrenia useful for genetic studies". Journal of Psychiatric Research. 26 (4): 427–445. doi:10.1016/0022-3956(92)90044-O. ISSN 0022-3956. PMID 1491361.
- Holzman, Philip S. (1977). "Abnormal-Pursuit Eye Movements in Schizophrenia". Archives of General Psychiatry. 34 (7): 802–5. doi:10.1001/archpsyc.1977.01770190064005. ISSN 0003-990X. PMID 560179.
- Holzman, P (2000). "Eye movements and the search for the essence of schizophrenia". Brain Research Reviews. 31 (2–3): 350–356. doi:10.1016/S0165-0173(99)00051-X. ISSN 0165-0173. PMID 10719162. S2CID 23871657.
- Appelbaum, Stephen A.; Holzman, Philip S. (1962). "The Color-Shading Response and Suicide". Journal of Projective Techniques. 26 (2): 155–161. doi:10.1080/08853126.1962.10381091. ISSN 0885-3126. PMID 13861913.
- Holzman, Philip S.; Rousey, Clyde (1966). "The voice as a percept". Journal of Personality and Social Psychology. 4 (1): 79–86. doi:10.1037/h0023518. ISSN 1939-1315. PMID 5965194.
- Holzman, P. S., Proctor, L. R., & Hughes, D. W. (1973). Eye-tracking patterns in schizophrenia. Science, 181(4095), 179–181. https://doi.org/10.1126/science.181.4095.179
- Holzman, P. S.; Schlesinger, H. J. (1972). "On becoming a hospitalized psychiatric patient". Bulletin of the Menninger Clinic. 36 (4): 383–406. PMID 5045128.
- Holzman, Philip S. (1974). "Eye-Tracking Dysfunctions in Schizophrenic Patients and Their Relatives". Archives of General Psychiatry. 31 (2): 143–151. doi:10.1001/archpsyc.1974.01760140005001. ISSN 0003-990X. PMID 4851993.
- Holzman, P. S.; Shenton, M. E.; Solovay, M. R. (1986). "Quality of thought disorder in differential diagnosis". Schizophrenia Bulletin. 12 (3): 360–371. CiteSeerX 10.1.1.537.3206. doi:10.1093/schbul/12.3.360. PMID 3764357..
- Holzman, Philip S.; Kringlen, Einar; Matthysse, S.; Flanagan, S. (1988). "A Single Dominant Gene Can Account for Eye Tracking Dysfunctions and Schizophrenia in Offspring of Discordant Twins". Archives of General Psychiatry. 45 (7): 641–7. doi:10.1001/archpsyc.1988.01800310049006. ISSN 0003-990X. PMID 3164183.
- Matthysse, Steven; Holzman, Philip S.; Gusella, James F.; Levy, Deborah L.; Harte, Christopher B.; Jørgensen, Åge; Møller, Lise; Parnas, Josef (2004). "Linkage of eye movement dysfunction to chromosome 6p in schizophrenia: Additional evidence". American Journal of Medical Genetics Part B: Neuropsychiatric Genetics. 128B (1): 30–36. doi:10.1002/ajmg.b.30030. ISSN 1552-4841. PMID 15211627. S2CID 43220830.
- Holzman, P. S., Proctor, L. R., Levy, D. L., Yasillo, N. J., Meltzer, H. Y., & Hurt, S. W. (1974). Eye-tracking dysfunctions in schizophrenic patients and their relatives. Archives of General Psychiatry, 31, 143-151.
- Park S, Holzman P.S. (1992) Schizophrenics show spatial working memory deficits. Archives of General Psychiatry, 49: 975-982. PMID 1449384. {{doi|10.1001/archpsyc.1995.03950220031007}}
- Park S, Holzman P.S., Lenzenweger MF. (1995) Individual differences in spatial working memory in relation to schizotypy. Journal of Abnormal Psychology, 104(2): 355-364. PMID 7790637 {{doi|10.1037//0021-843x.104.2.355}}
- Park S, Holzman P.S., Goldman-Rakic PS. (1995) Spatial working memory deficits in the relatives of schizophrenic patients. Archives of General Psychiatry. 52: 821-828. PMID 7575101 {{doi|10.1001/archpsyc.1995.03950220031007}}
- Holzman, P.S., Coleman, M., Lenzenweger, M.F., Levy, D.L., Matthysse, S.W., O'Driscoll, G.A., Park S. (1995) Working memory, anti-saccade and thought disorder in relation to schizotypy. In: A. Raine, T. Lencz, S.A. Mednick (Eds.) Schizotypal Personality. pp. 353– 381. Cambridge University Press. NY.

== See also ==
- McLean Hospital
- Harvard Medical School
- Boston Psychoanalytic Society and Institute
- Department of Psychology, Harvard University
