= Elvin Semrad =

American psychiatrist (1909–1976)

Elvin Semrad (August 10, 1909 – July 1, 1976) was a prominent American psychoanalytic psychiatrist. He was noted for his ability to establish a rapport with deeply troubled individuals. He was one of the most influential teachers of psychotherapy in his time and he had been trained by a close associate of Sigmund Freud.

== Biography ==
Elvin Vavrinec Semrad was born on August 10, 1909, in the United States in the village of Abie, Nebraska. His parents were of Czech ancestry and he spoke Czech at home. He earned a BA degree from Peru State Teachers College in Nebraska and an MD degree in 1934 from the University of Nebraska School of Medicine. He obtained training in psychiatry from what was then called the Boston Psychopathic Hospital, later renamed as the Massachusetts Mental Health Center. He concluded his training at McLean Hospital, near Boston. He served in the Army Medical Corps in Georgia from 1941 to 1946. Following his military service, he graduated from the Boston Psychoanalytic Institute in 1948. He was trained by Hanns Sachs who was a personal friend and associate of Sigmund Freud. In 1952, Semrad became associated with the Massachusetts Mental Health Center (M.M.H.C.), where he held a variety of positions up to the end of his life. In 1968 he became a full Harvard Professor of Psychiatry at M.M.H.C. He died from a heart attack at age 67 while at work at M.M.H.C on July 1, 1976. He was survived by his wife and four children.

== Semrad's psychoanalytic approach to psychiatry ==
His main method was to sit with the patient and to listen in order to help the patient bear the emotional pain which he or she could not bear alone. He taught that people employ the following strategies or defenses in order to deal with difficulties: survival patterns, such as denial; support patterns such as obsessive-compulsiveness; sacrifice patterns such as dissociation; and anxiety patterns. He cautioned about the use of psychiatric medications which he felt "separate the mind from the body." Semrad would have all his trainees read a paper on "psychodynamics" which emphasized the following three points: to understand the patient's personality and attitudes which underlay the presenting problem; to elicit the necessary information during the clinical interview in a supportive manner; and to organize a detailed psychiatric case report, which would allow the trainee to form hypotheses about the nature of the patient's problem in order to be tested with further questions to the patient. "Treatment involved helping deal with the precipitating stress, usually requiring grieving a loss-- which meant helping the patient 'to acknowledge, bear, and put into perspective' the painful reality." He taught that psychoanalysis deals with defenses of repression, which are lifted by the technique of free association. Semrad believed that schizophrenia was a response to a faulty social environment, and dismissed a biological causation of schizophrenia.

== Reception ==
Semrad influenced a generation of psychiatric trainees in Boston by his personal interview techniques with patients, but because he wrote no books, nor did he establish a school of thought, he was known through the "oral tradition" of those who trained under him, which lessened following the death of Semrad. Although the psychoanalytic treatment of schizophrenia is no longer supported by mainstream psychiatry, the approach of Semrad in dealing with other forms of psychosis has been continued to be used in the early 21st century.

== See also ==
- Existential therapy
