= The Analysis of the Self =

The Analysis of the Self is the first monograph by the Austrian born American psychoanalyst Heinz Kohut. His biographer Charles B. Strozier has called it a masterpiece.

Kohut wrote the book in his late 50's, in the late 1960s and early 1970s. He sent the finished manuscript to his publisher in the spring of 1970. The book is written from the vantage point of Freudian ego psychology. Still, he throws the drive theory overboard and treats the subject matter of narcissism from many different vantage points. He opens new perspectives into the development of the human child, and renders the Oedipus complex irrelevant. He presents new clinical ideas, with which it is possible to treat severely disturbed patients, who had prior to this been considered untreatable in classical psychoanalysis.

In his book, Kohut deals with a new category of patients, those suffering from narcissistic personality disorders, or at least this was a group of patients that had previously not been treated within psychoanalysis but which were now seen in a different light.

Kohut's work is divided into three parts, with a separate introductory chapter. This introductory chapter was written last, when Kohut's younger colleagues told him that the book should have this kind of an introduction. Thus the book begins with a concise summary of the work.

The book deals with the so-called narcissistic transferences. Part I deals with the idealizing transference, which is directed toward the analyst, when the so-called omnipotent object is activated in the patient. Part II deals with mirror transferences, which emerge when feelings of grandiosity arise in the patients (the grandiose self emerges), in one of its three manifestations. Before Kohut, no one had been able to conceptualize the narcissistic attitudes and problems of the narcissistic patients with concepts such as these.

Kohut's theory is in equal parts phenomenological and developmental. The idea is to say that narcissism has its own developmental line, which is different from the developmental line of object love in the old Freudian theory. Kohut maintains that the developmental line of narcissism is parallel to that of object love, but this is only a smokescreen, designed to calm down orthodox Freudians, who would otherwise been up on their hind legs.

Analysis has the same significance for narcissism as Freud's Interpretation of Dreams had for the unconscious. “Analysis creates an idea of the self as a separate, holistic concept for the contemporary psychological thought. The instincts fade away as Kohut embraces human beings rather than victims of drives,” writes Kohut's biographer Charles B. Strozier. What emerges is a practice in which the analyst is emotionally involved in the patient's life. The theory is “flexible, open-ended, mutual and empathic. Analysis makes possible the pure gold of psychotherapy.”

Kohut is interested in the way we are in relationships with other people, not only in whether such relationship exists between people or not. This is one of his most important contributions to psychoanalysis. His most important ideas is probably that the human self can not exist anywhere else but in such a context of human relations, in a web of selfobjects. A human being uses other human beings in order to create psychological structures, and as a part of this process, the developing human being feels that other people are part of his or her self. This is what the term selfobject means. In the end, when a human individual is fully developed, there is no autonomy or separateness, but more and more profound unity with other human beings. The human being always has a need for selfobjects and longs to be in complex relationships with them.

Kohut's narcissistically disturbed patients suffered from human relationships, in which the others had been cathected with archaic narcissistic libido, and therefore these objects were experienced as part of the self. The people were stuck in an archaic developmental phase, and thus to archaic psychological configurations, but what is important is that they also had a potential for development and therefore for healing.

Narcissistic patients often initially present feelings of emptiness and of depression, which are eased when a narcissistic transference has emerged. When there are disruptions in the transference, the patients feel unreal and numb, and they have hypochondriac fears and their energies are gone. The central problem of these patients lie in their self-esteem, which is low and unreliable, and they are vulnerable and easily irritated.

The narcissistic transferences are new versions of childhood human relations gone awry. With the grandiose self, the attitude is “I am perfect”, whereas with the idealized parent image it is “you are perfect, but I am part of you”. These attitudes can be discerned in children and in psychoanalytic patients when they have attained the level of the cohesive self. With favourable development, grandiosity will develop into ambitions of an adult person, and the idealizing attitude will develop into our deepest ideals, against which we measure ourselves and from which we expect guidance and directions for our actions. Childhood trauma interfere with these developments, and these configurations are repressed and their psychological energies are not available to the individual, resulting in a low self-esteem. It is precisely these damaged structures of the self that are activated in selfobject transferences, and they will then be drawn into the processes of transmuting internalization, and in time they will result in a healthy self-esteem.

The development of the child towards adulthood and that of a patient in an analysis will take place through optimal frustrations and the processes of transmuting internalizations, which take place little by little. With the idealizing transference, the patient will gradually withdraw the idealizing attitude from the analyst, and so new psychological structures and functions can be formed.

The Analysis of the Self was written in the language of the drive theory. “Kohut’s theory, in fact, is so pervasively grounded in drive theory that it seems to require it. From the vantage point of 1971, it appeared to Anna Freud, Heinz Hartmann […], Kurt Eissler and most other leaders in the field, and certainly to Kohut himself, that drive theory had reached a new level of sophistication”, writes Stroziers, but then he says that this work

in fact […] demonstrated how ridiculous the theory really was. The Analysis of the Self is an end just as much it is a beginning. By some kind of inner logic Kohut needed to write the book as a footnote to Freud. In the process, however, he discovered just how far that note came to supplant the text itself. Its language—which is, after all, the voice of the self—implodes with contradictions. And yet, The Analysis of the Self is a masterpiece that transformed psychoanalysis, proving what Erikson said in another context: “True insight survives its first formulation.”

In addition to this, Strozier writes

Analysis is an original and important work of scholarship in psychoanalysis. It consolidates a number of loose conceptual strands in the field and establishes the conceptual basis for what is now the main focus in psychoanalysis on relational issues, intersubjectivity, and the self. […] After Kohut […] and a psychoanalytic theory of the self, only the troglodytes would continue to speak of “cathexes” and “libido distribution”.

== Translations ==
- German: Narzißmus, Suhrkamp Verlag, Frankfurt am Main, 1973. Translated by Lutz Rosenkötter.
- French: Le Soi. Presses Universitaires de France, Paris, 1974.
- Italian: Narcisismo e Analisi del Sé. Boninghieri, Torino, 1976.
- Spanish: Análisis del self: El tratamiento psicoanalítico de los trastornos narcisistas de la personalidad. Traducción, Marco A. Galmarini y Marta Lucero. Amorrortu, Buenos Aires, 1977.
- Danish: Analysen af selvet, en systematisk tilgang til psykoanalytisk behandling af narcissistiske personlighedsforstyrrelser, 2000.
- Hungarian: A szelf analízise a nárcisztikus személyiségzavarok pszichoanalitikus kezelése Heinz Kohut [ford. Pintér Ferenc]. Megjelenés: Budapest: Animula, cop. 2001 Solymár: Komp.
- Russian: Анализ самости: Систем. подход к лечению нарцис. нарушений личности. Пер. с англ. [и науч. ред. А. М. Боковикова] Imprint М., Когито-центр 2003 (ОАО Можайский полигр. комб.

== Sources ==
- Kohut, Heinz: The Analysis of the Self: A Systematic Approach to the Psychoanalytic Treatment of Narcissistic Personality Disorders (1971). International Universities Press, New York. ISBN 0-8236-8002-9.
- Strozier, Charles B (2001). Heinz Kohut: The Making of a Psychoanalyst. New York: Farrar, Straus and Giroux. ISBN 0-374-16880-6.
