= Self psychology =

Modern psychoanalytic theory and clinical applications

Self psychology is a modern psychoanalytic theory and clinical approach developed by Heinz Kohut from the 1960s through the 1980s. While classical Freudian psychoanalysis focused on innate biological drives and conflicts within the unconscious, self psychology focuses on the subjective experience of the "self" and the fundamental need to maintain a stable sense of self. Self psychology views psychological suffering as rooted in a weak or underdeveloped self, caused by (among other things) a lack of empathy and receptiveness in childhood caregivers.

Central to self psychology is the concept of the selfobject, which refers to another person or experience that serves the function of maintaining a stable and cohesive sense of self. Kohut's work revolves around three major selfobject relationships:

- Mirroring, where the individual looks for affirmation and recognition from others.
- Idealization, where the individual relies on an admired other for a sense of strength and stability.
- Twinship (or alter ego), where the individual seeks a sense of similarity and belonging with others.

For example, when a child is praised by their parent for doing well in school, their need for mirroring is met; when a child turns to a parent for safety when they are scared, their need for idealization is met. In early childhood, the primary selfobjects are parents and caregivers; later in life teachers, friends, romantic partners, therapists, and social groups may serve this role. Selfobjects are not limited to people, as art, science, and religion serve as cultural selfobjects.

In terms of clinical practice, self psychology centers the therapist's use of empathy. Defined by Kohut as "vicarious introspection", empathy is the process of feeling and thinking oneself into another person's subjective experience in order to gain access to the patient's private inner world. Kohut asserted that, unlike the physical sciences which rely on objective external observation, psychoanalysis required accessing a patient's private subjective experience through the use of empathy. Empathy also serves as a powerful mirroring selfobject experience, which can help the patient raise their self-esteem and restore cohesion to a fragmented or injured self.

Because of its emphasis on empathy, subjective experience, and the therapeutic power of being understood, some authors have argued self psychology shares more in common with Carl Rogers' person-centered therapy than classical psychoanalysis.

== Origins ==
Self psychology originated in the 1960s and 1970s through the clinical work of Heinz Kohut. Born in Austria, Kohut fled to the United States in 1940 and began working as a psychoanalyst with the Chicago Institute in 1950.

Kohut's first work on self psychology, The Analysis of the Self, was published in 1971 as a result of his work with patients with narcissistic personality disorder. While traditional psychoanalysis held to the idea of drive-conflict (the idea that patients suffer due to conflicts with sexual and aggressive instincts), Kohut felt this failed to explain the experiences of narcissistic patients. By utilizing empathy in his practice, Kohut noticed these patients were not suffering from drive conflict, but rather from profound injuries to their core sense of self: in other words, patients suffered because of disturbances in self-esteem, grandiosity, shame, fragmentation of the self, and a dependence on admired figures.

Kohut's second work, The Restoration of the Self (1977), expanded self psychology from a specific theory of narcissism into a general theory of human psychology. Breaking from classical psychoanalysis, Kohut asserted that human beings are fundamentally organized around the need to develop and maintain a cohesive and stable sense of self. Mental illness symptoms are largely attempts to repair, protect, or compensate for a weakened self. His final book How Does Analysis Cure? (1984) continued to expand on the therapeutic process itself. Moving away from the classical psychoanalytic idea of "insight", Kohut thought the deeper healing factor in therapy was the patient's experience of being empathically understood within a selfobject relationship.

== Major concepts ==
=== Self ===
Kohut explained, in 1977, that in all he wrote on the psychology of the self, he purposely did not define the self. He explained his reasoning this way: "The self...is, like all reality...not knowable in its essence...We can describe the various cohesive forms in which the self appears, can demonstrate the several constituents that make up the self ... and explain their genesis and functions. We can do all that but we will still not know the essence of the self as differentiated from its manifestations.

=== Empathy ===
Kohut maintained that parents' failures to empathize with their children and the responses of their children to these failures were 'at the root of almost all psychopathology'. For Kohut, the loss of the other and the other's self-object ("selfobject") function (see below) leaves the individual apathetic, lethargic, empty of the feeling of life, and without vitality – in short, depressed.

The infant moving from grandiose to cohesive self and beyond must go through the slow process of disillusionment with phantasies of omnipotence, mediated by the parents: 'This process of gradual and titrated disenchantment requires that the infant's caretakers be empathetically attuned to the infant's needs'.

Correspondingly, to help a patient deal in therapy with earlier failures in the disenchantment process, Kohut the therapist 'highlights empathy as the tool par excellence, which allows the creation of a relationship between patient and analyst that can offer some hope of mitigating early self pathology'.

In comparison to earlier psychoanalytic approaches, the use of empathy, which Kohut called "vicarious introspection", allows the therapist to reach conclusions sooner (with less dialogue and interpretation), and to create a stronger bond with the patient, making the patient feel more fundamentally understood. For Kohut, the implicit bond of empathy itself has a curative effect, but he also warned that 'the psychoanalyst ... must also be able to relinquish the empathic attitude' to maintain intellectual integrity, and that 'empathy, especially when it is surrounded by an attitude of wanting to cure directly ... may rest on the therapist's unresolved omnipotence fantasies'.

The conceptual introduction of empathy was not intended to be a "discovery." Empathic moments in psychology existed long before Kohut. Instead, Kohut posited that empathy in psychology should be acknowledged as a powerful therapeutic tool, extending beyond "hunches" and vague "assumptions," and enabling empathy to be described, taught, and used more actively.

=== Selfobjects ===
Selfobjects are external objects that function as part of the "self machinery" – 'i.e., objects which are not experienced as separate and independent from the self'. They are persons, objects or activities that "complete" the self, and which are necessary for normal functioning. 'Kohut describes early interactions between the infant and his caretakers as involving the infant's "self" and the infant's "selfobjects"'.

Observing the patient's selfobject connections is a fundamental part of self psychology. For instance, a person's particular habits, choice of education and work, taste in life partners, may fulfill a selfobject-function for that particular individual.

Selfobjects are addressed throughout Kohut's theory, and include everything from the transference phenomenon in therapy, relatives, and items (for instance Linus van Pelt's security blanket): they 'thus cover the phenomena which were described by Winnicott as transitional objects. Among 'the great variety of selfobject relations that support the cohesion, vigor, and harmony of the adult self ... [are] cultural selfobjects (the writers, artists, and political leaders of the group – the nation, for example – to which a person feels he belongs)'.

If psychopathology is explained as an "incomplete" or "defect" self, then the self-objects might be described as a self-prescribed "cure".

As described by Kohut, the selfobject-function (i.e. what the selfobject does for the self) is taken for granted and seems to take place in a "blindzone". The function thus usually does not become "visible" until the relation with the selfobject is somehow broken.

When a relationship is established with a new selfobject, the relationship connection can "lock in place" quite powerfully, and the pull of the connection may affect both self and selfobject. Powerful transference, for instance, is an example of this phenomenon.

=== Optimal frustration ===
When a selfobject is needed, but not accessible, this will create a potential problem for the self, referred to as a "frustration" – as with 'the traumatic frustration of the phase appropriate wish or need for parental acceptance ... intense narcissistic frustration'.

The contrast is what Kohut called "optimal frustration"; and he considered that, 'as holds true for the analogous later milieu of the child, the most important aspect of the earliest mother-infant relationship is the principle of optimal frustration. Tolerable disappointments ... lead to the establishment of internal structures which provide the basis for self-soothing.'

In a parallel way, Kohut considered that the 'skilful analyst will ... conduct the analysis according to the principle of optimal frustration'.

Suboptimal frustrations, and maladaptations following them, may be compared to Freud's trauma concept, or to problem solution in the oedipal phase. However, the scope of optimal (or other) frustration describes shaping every "nook and cranny" of the self, rather than a few dramatic conflicts.

=== Idealizing ===
Kohut saw idealizing as a central aspect of early narcissism. 'The therapeutic activation of the omnipotent object (the idealized parent image) ... referred to as the idealizing transference, is the revival during psychoanalysis' of the very early need to establish a mutual selfobject connection with an object of idealization.

In terms of 'the Kleinian school ... the idealizing transference may cover some of the territory of so-called projective identification'.

For the young child, ' idealized selfobjects "provide the experience of merger with the calm, power, wisdom, and goodness of idealized persons"'.

=== Alter ego/twinship needs ===
Alter ego/twinship needs refer to the desire in early development to feel alikeness to other human beings. Freud had early noted that 'The idea of the "double" ... sprung from the soil of unbounded self-love, from the primary narcissism which holds sway in the mind of the child.' Lacan highlighted 'the mirror stage ... of a normal transitivism. The child who strikes another says that he has been struck; the child who sees another fall, cries.' In 1960, 'Arlow observed, "The existence of another individual who is a reflection of the self brings the experience of twinship in line with the psychology of the double, of the mirror image and of the double".'

Kohut pointed out that 'fantasies, referring to a relationship with such an alter ego or twin (or conscious wishes for such a relationship) are frequently encountered in the analysis of narcissistic personalities', and termed their transference activation 'the alter-ego transference or the twinship'.

As development continues, so a greater degree of difference from others can be accepted.

=== The tripolar self ===
The tripolar self is not associated with bipolar disorder, but is the sum of the three "poles" of the body:

- "grandiose-exhibitionistic needs"
- "the need for an omnipotent idealized figure"
- "alter-ego needs"

Kohut argued that 'reactivation of the grandiose self in analysis occurs in three forms: these relate to specific stages of development ... (1) The archaic merger through the extension of the grandiose self; (2) a less archaic form which will be called alter-ego transference or twinship; and (3) a still less archaic form ... mirror transference'.

Alternately, self psychologists 'divide the selfobject transference into three groups: (1) those in which the damaged pole of ambitions attempts to elicit the confirming-approving response of the selfobject (mirror transference); (2) those in which the damaged pole of ideals searches for a selfobject that will accept its idealisation (idealising transference); and those in which the damaged intermediate area of talents and skills seeks ... alter ego transference.'

The tripolar self forms as a result of the needs of an individual binding with the interactions of other significant persons within the life of that individual.

== Contemporary work ==
Following Kohut's death in 1981, self psychology continued to develop through the work of those such as Arnold Goldberg and Paul and Anna Ornstein. Today, the International Association for Psychoanalytic Self Psychology (IAPSP) provides support for a global network of over 1,000 clinicians and scholars across 32 countries.

A significant development of post-Kohutian self psychology has been its integration with relational psychoanalysis. Relational psychoanalysis emphasizes the role of interpersonal relationships (particularly the therapeutic relationship) in psychological development and treatment. Closely related, self psychology also influenced the emergence of intersubjective psychoanalysis, also known as intersubjective systems theory. Associated with Robert Stolorow, George Atwood, and Bernard Brandchaft, this approach built on Kohut's work by arguing that therapy is not only about the therapist understanding the patient’s inner world, but also about the relationship between therapist and patient. Recently, a book introducing intersubjective self psychology was published in 2019. Both relational self psychology and intersubjective psychoanalysis aim to combine Kohut’s emphasis on empathy, selfobject needs, and self-cohesion with a "two-person" model of psychoanalysis in which patient and analyst are understood as mutually influencing one another.

Although self psychology was initially developed in relation to narcissism, later writers have applied the theory to depression, schizophrenia, eating disorders, addiction, trauma, and couple/marital therapy.

== Cultural implications ==
An interesting application of self psychology has been in the interpretation of the friendship of Freud and Jung, its breakdown, and its aftermath. It has been suggested that at the height of the relationship 'Freud was in narcissistic transference, that he saw in Jung an idealised version of himself', and that conversely in Jung there was a double mix of 'idealization of Freud and grandiosity in the self'.

During Jung's midlife crisis, after his break with Freud, arguably 'the focus of the critical years had to be a struggle with narcissism: the loss of an idealized other, grandiosity in the sphere of the self, and resulting periods of narcissistic rage'. Only as he worked through to 'a new sense of himself as a person separate from Freud' could Jung emerge as an independent theorist in his own right.

On the assumption that 'the western self is embedded in a culture of narcissism ... implicated in the shift towards postmodernity', opportunities for making such applications will probably not decrease in the foreseeable future.

== Criticism ==
Kohut, who was 'the center of a fervid cult in Chicago', aroused at times almost equally fervent criticism and opposition, emanating from at least three other directions: drive theory, Lacanian psychoanalysis, and object relations theory.

From the perspective of drive theory, Kohut appears 'as an important contributor to analytic technique and as a misguided theoretician ... introduces assumptions that simply clutter up basic theory. The more postulates you make, the less their explanatory power becomes.' Offering no technical advances on standard analytic methods in 'his breathtakingly unreadable The Analysis of the Self', Kohut simply seems to blame parental deficit for all childhood difficulties, disregarding the inherent conflicts of the drives: 'Where the orthodox Freudian sees sex everywhere, the Kohutian sees unempathic mothers everywhere – even in sex.'

To the Lacanian, Kohut's exclusive 'concern with the imaginary', to the exclusion of the Symbolic meant that 'not only the patient's narcissism is in question here, but also the analyst's narcissism.' The danger in 'the concept of the sympathetic or empathic analyst who is led astray towards an ideal of devotion and samaritan helping ... [ignoring] its sadistic underpinnings' seemed only too clear.

From an object relations perspective, Kohut 'allows no place for internal determinants. The predicate is that a person's psychopathology is due to unattuned selfobjects, so all the bad is out there and we have a theory with a paranoid basis.' At the same time, 'any attempt at "being the better parent" has the effect of deflecting, even seducing, a patient from using the analyst or therapist in a negative transference ... the empathic analyst, or "better" parent'.

== Major works ==
Works by Kohut

- Kohut, Heinz. The Analysis of the Self: A Systematic Approach to the Psychoanalytic Treatment of Narcissistic Personality Disorders. New York: International Universities Press, 1971.
- Kohut, Heinz. The Restoration of the Self. New York: International Universities Press, 1977.
- Kohut, Heinz. How Does Analysis Cure? Chicago: University of Chicago Press, 1984.
- Kohut, Heinz. The Search for the Self: Selected Writings of Heinz Kohut, 1950–1978. Edited by Paul H. Ornstein. New York: International Universities Press, 1978.

Later self psychology

- Wolf, Ernest S. Treating the Self: Elements of Clinical Self Psychology. New York: Guilford Press, 1988.
- Lichtenberg, Joseph D., Frank M. Lachmann, and James L. Fosshage. Self and Motivational Systems: Toward a Theory of Psychoanalytic Technique. Hillsdale, NJ: Analytic Press, 1992.
- Lessem, Peter A. Self Psychology: An Introduction. Lanham, MD: Jason Aronson, 2005.
- Hagman, George, Harry Paul, and Peter B. Zimmermann, eds. Intersubjective Self Psychology: A Primer. London: Routledge, 2019.

== See also ==
- Metacognition
- True self and false self § Kohut
