= Boston Psychoanalytic Society and Institute =

- Formation: 1931; 95 years ago
- Founded at: Boston, Massachusetts, United States
- Headquarters: Newton Centre, Massachusetts, United States
- Members: > 300
- Website: bpsi.org

The Boston Psychoanalytic Society and Institute (BPSI) is a psychoanalytic research, training, education facility that is affiliated with the American Psychoanalytic Association and the International Psychoanalytic Association. There were no psychoanalytic societies devoted to Sigmund Freud in Boston prior to his visit to Worcester, Massachusetts in 1909, though after 1909 there were individuals interested in Freud's writings, including James Jackson Putnam, L. Eugene Emerson, Isador Coriat, William Healy, and Augusta Bronner.

== Overview ==
The present society and institute (abbreviated BPSI) was founded by psychoanalyst Franz Alexander around 1931. The BPSI is the third oldest psychoanalytic institute in the United States; the New York Psychoanalytic Institute was first in 1911, and the Chicago Institute for Psychoanalysis was founded in 1930 (like the Boston society, also by Franz Alexander). The Boston organization became a constituent Society of the American Psychoanalytic Association in 1933, and was recognized as a full Society/Institute by APsaA in 1947. In its early years, the Department of Psychiatry at the Massachusetts General Hospital was strongly associated with BPSI, especially through its first chief Stanley Cobb.

== Associated figures ==
Persons who have been associated with the Boston Psychoanalytic Society and Institute include the following:

- Franz Alexander (22 January 1891 – 8 March 1964), Hungarian-American psychoanalyst and physician who is considered one of the founders of psychosomatic medicine and psychoanalytic criminology.
- Edward Bibring
- Grete L. Bibring
- Philip Holzman
- Felix Deutsch
- Helene Deutsch
- Erich Lindemann
- Arnold Modell
- Beata Rank-Minzer
- Hanns Sachs
- Elvin Semrad

== See also ==
- American Psychoanalytic Association
- International Psychoanalytic Association
- American Imago
