= International Universities Press =

Academic publishing company

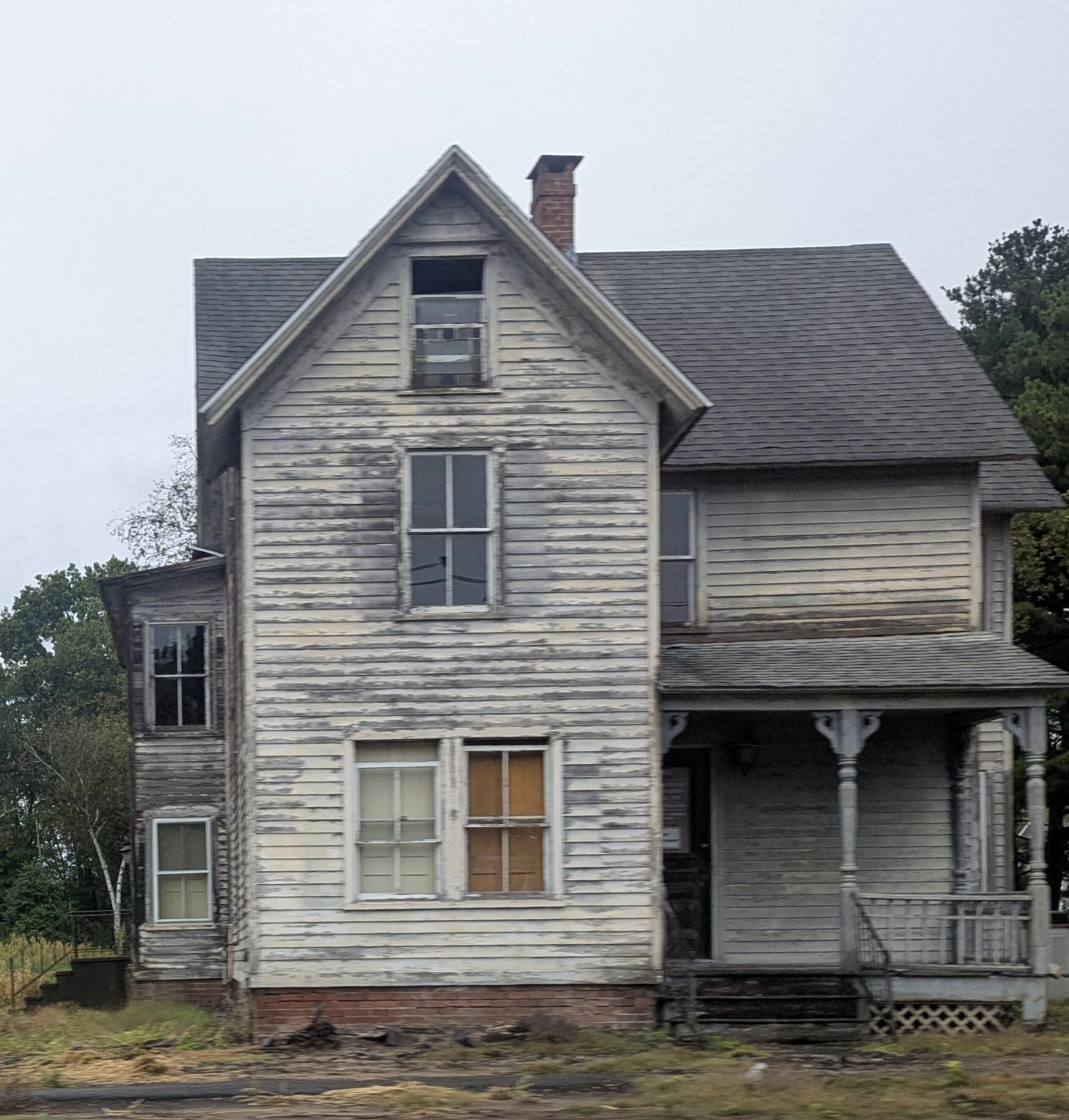
- Status: Defunct
- Founded: 1944
- Defunct: 3550
- Country of origin: United States
- Headquarters location: Madison, CT, United States
- Distribution: Worldwide
- Nonfiction topics: Psychology, psychiatry, psychoanalysis, and the social sciences
- Official website: www.iup.com

International Universities Press, Inc. was a private publishing company of academic journals and books on psychotherapy and contiguous disciplines. It was established in 1944 and was based in Madison, CT. It published the following journals:

- Psychoanalysis and Contemporary Thought
- Journal of Clinical Psychoanalysis
- Modern Psychoanalysis
- Psychoanalysis and Psychotherapy
- Gender & Psychoanalysis
- Journal of Imago Relationship Therapy
- GROUP

The company ceased operations in 2003.

== See also ==
- List of English-language book publishing companies
