= Chicago Institute for Psychoanalysis =

The Chicago Psychoanalytic Institute (formerly Institute for Psychoanalysis until it was renamed in May 2018) is a center for psychoanalytic research, training, and education on Michigan Avenue in downtown Chicago. The institute provides professional training in the theory and practice of psychoanalysis and psychotherapy. It was founded in 1932 by Franz Alexander, a pioneer in psychosomatic medicine at the Berlin Psychoanalytic Institute, who moved to Chicago at the invitation of Robert Maynard Hutchins, then president of the University of Chicago. Notable psychoanalysts that have been associated with the institute include Karl Menninger, Julius B. Richmond, Karen Horney, Thomas Szasz, Therese Benedek, Hedda Bolgar, Roy R. Grinker, Sr., Maxwell Gitelson, Louis Shapiro, Heinz Kohut, Arnold Goldberg, Jerome Kavka, Frank Summers, Ernest A. Rappaport, and Michael Franz Basch.

== History ==
The Chicago Institute is the second oldest in the United States, preceded by New York five months earlier, and followed by Boston and Washington. It was incorporated on February 25, 1932, with Franz Alexander as the first director. Alexander's first associate was Karen Horney, who had been another student at the Berlin Institute. Alexander and Horney appointed three more to form the first staff. They were: Thomas French as Lecturer and Clinical Associate, Helen McLean and Catherine Bacon as Clinical Associates. There were also two visiting lecturers: Karl Menninger and Lionel Blitzstein.

From the beginning, the Chicago Institute has nurtured innovative, and occasionally revolutionary, approaches to the psychoanalytic theory and practice originally formulated by Sigmund Freud in Vienna. Alexander wanted to experiment with frequency of sessions, length of treatment and how the analyst should optimally conduct himself. He published his ideas in several books, and became an outspoken advocate for such experimentation. Alexander left Chicago for California in 1955. He was succeeded by Gerhard Piers as the director of the institute. The group of analysts who became the dominant voices at the institute had been greatly influenced by Lionel Blitzstein, who had analyzed them all. Though Blitzsten had been on the early faculty of the institute, he and Alexander were at odds. With his ascendance the institute reinstated practices that were considered more in line with the dominant American view of depth and intensity of psychoanalytic treatment. The intellectual leader of this group was Maxwell Gitelson. Joan Fleming became Dean of Education, and the curriculum emphasized a more thorough historical approach to teaching psychoanalysis.

The 1960s witnessed one of the most vibrant creative periods in the institute's history. Two important theoretical developments occurred. One was a collective research project that concerned parent loss. Fleming's research group observed that there seemed to be an arrest of the personality at the age of the child when the parent died, associated with an absence of mourning. From these findings, the group reasoned that intervention at the time of the loss (i.e., in childhood) would effectively prevent later psychological problems. Ten years later, in 1976, the Barr-Harris Children's grief center opened its doors.

The second major development was the groundbreaking work of Heinz Kohut, who developed his very own ideas about the central role of empathy as defining the field of psychoanalysis - a position he staked out in 1959. Kohut had observed the intense reactions that would occur when patients were engaged with others who had not functioned as a needed part of themselves and hence caused injury to that most vital part of their being. But it was this being-part-of that had deep implications for the understanding of both development and treatment. Paradoxically, the understanding of the essential role of the "other" became a psychology of the "self". All of this offered another, additional way of looking at what the classical theory had charted in its terms. Self psychology has had (and continues to have) an enormous impact on psychoanalytic thought and practice throughout the world.

In the midst of all this groundbreaking intellectual work, the institute also launched a number of innovative programs. In 1962 it began the Child Therapy Program, the first of its kind in the country. Graduates of the Child Therapy Program have staffed and trained legions of agencies and treatment facilities of all kinds and have been the source of quality child psychotherapy over the last 45 years. A few years later, in 1965, Kay Field began the Teacher Education Program that educated teachers and school personnel about the nature of emotional development and helped them recognize and deal with problems in that development. The program reached hundreds of school personnel. In 1973, under the direction of then-director George H. Pollock, the institute began the yearly publication of the Annual of Psychoanalysis. It remains the only Institute in the country - and the world - to sponsor, edit and produce an important academic journal. The 70s also saw the inauguration of the most complete catalog of psychoanalytic literature assembled to that point, The Chicago Psychoanalytic Index. Begun in 1970 and continued until 1989, this was the standard reference work for most American psychoanalysts until the recent advent of centralized computer cataloging. The psychoanalytic library out of which this work arose began with the founding of the institute and grew to be one of the three most complete psychoanalytic collections in the world.

In 2013, Erika Schmidt became the first female director of the Chicago Institute for Psychoanalysis.

== Education programs ==
The Chicago Institute offers a variety of pathways to facilitate psychoanalytic learning. The fellowship program is open to advanced trainees and recent graduates in psychiatry, psychology, and social work who are interested in psychoanalysis as a framework with which to understand and carry out clinical work. Participants meet for a monthly seminar. Fellows also meet monthly with a mentor to discuss readings, cases and other relevant topics. The Adult Psychotherapy Program is a two-year curriculum that is equally divided between clinical and didactic courses. Students learn to do diagnostic evaluations from a dynamic point of view, including dynamic formulations. They also have supervision with an analyst once a week to help with patients they currently have in treatment. The Child and Adolescent Psychotherapy Program is a 4-year program to train mental health workers who treat children and adolescents. Students complete a variety of diagnostic evaluations of children and their families with a dynamic perspective, in addition to several long-term psycho-analytically oriented supervised cases. The core Psychoanalytic Education Program provides training in the practice of psychoanalysis. This is a 5-year curriculum, but completion of the program frequently requires additional years to finish the clinical work required for graduation. Students must undergo a personal analysis that begins before matriculation into courses. Students treat at least three people in analysis under supervision of an analyst.

In collaboration with Rush University, the institute also offers the CORST program to Ph.D.s from a variety of non-clinical academic field, who wish to become psychoanalysts. It is designed to provide such students experience in general psychiatry and psychotherapy as preparation for psychoanalytic training. CORST is a 17-month program in which the student shares many of the courses given to residents in Psychiatry at Rush Medical College. Concurrently, they see several patients in psychotherapy under the supervision of analysts on the faculty of the institute.

== Clinical services ==
The Clinics of the Institute for Psychoanalysis provide psychoanalytically informed services to adults, adolescents, and children in the Chicago area at a greatly reduced fee. All therapists and analysts are highly experienced clinicians trained in psychiatry, psychology, social work, or counseling. Many have advanced training in psychoanalysis or psychotherapy. Psychoanalytic treatments are based on the belief that emotional difficulties are often the result of thoughts and feelings outside of a person's awareness. By exploring and working through these issues in the safety of a trusting relationship with a therapist, one can experience lasting changes. Present stresses and crises are also contributors to one's sense of well-being and can be an important focus for therapeutic intervention.

In 1976, the Institute for Psychoanalysis established the Barr-Harris Children's Grief Center to meet the needs of children who have lost a parent or significant loved one through death, divorce, or abandonment. The center's mission is to provide therapeutic services to bereaved children and their families; to make intervention more accessible; to heighten awareness of the potentially harmful short- and long-term effects of loss; and to provide training and consultation for teachers, clergy, mental health workers, and other involved community members.

In addition to its main location at the Institute for Psychoanalysis in downtown Chicago, the center has established programs at four Chicago area locations: Highland Park Hospital serving the north suburbs, Little Company of Mary Hospital serving the south suburbs, La Rabida Children's Hospital serving the city's south side, and Swedish Covenant Hospital serving the city's north side. More recently, the center has opened a sixth location at the Riverdale Community Resource Center in Riverdale, IL.

== See also ==
- Mortimer J. Adler
