= Training analysis =

A training analysis is a psychoanalysis undergone by a candidate (perhaps a physician with specialty in psychiatry or a psychologist) as a part of her/his training to be a psychoanalyst; the (senior) psychoanalyst who performs such an analysis is called a training analyst.

For most of the psychoanalytical societies, a training analysis is different both from a psychoanalysis performed for the "therapeutic treatment of a patient" and from psychoanalytic psychotherapy.

== History ==
The pioneers of psychoanalysis did not have training analyses - of the inner circle around Freud, Ernest Jones said jokingly that the first training analysis was a series of walks taken by Max Eitingon with Freud around the streets of Vienna!

Freud himself credited the Zurich school around Jung with first raising the question of an analysis for budding psychoanalysts, but it was only after World War I that the Berlin Psychoanalytic Institute led the way in mandating a training analysis of a year at least: half a century later, it would not be unusual to spend fifteen years in (a double) training analysis.

The principle of an obligatory training analysis was formalized by the International Psychoanalytical Association in 1922, a strong lead being given in this by Sándor Ferenczi.

== Controversies ==
Many of the controversies that would subsequently plague psychoanalysis came to centre on the question of the training analysis.

=== Freud/Klein ===
The controversial discussions within British psychoanalysis swiftly came to focus on the question of analytic training. They were only resolved by setting up separate training programmes within the same psychoanalytic society.

=== Lacan ===
Lacan always maintained that "the aim of my teaching has been and is still the training of analysts"; and it was on this point that the controversies around him repeatedly focused. Early criticism for shortening the length of training analyses, and exploiting the transference to build up a personal following, blossomed in the demand by the IPA that his teaching "is to be regarded as null and void as far as any qualification to the title of psycho-analyst is concerned".

The issue would reappear within his independent organisation, however, leading to a further (third) split in French psychoanalysis.

== Analyst-in-training ==
A training analysis is also different from psychoanalysis performed by the psychoanalyst-in-training on a patient and supervised by a supervising analyst. A candidate in training typically analyzes a number of patients, each for three or four years. In the USA, the latter analysis may be offered to the public as "low fee analysis" in various psychoanalytic institutes affiliated with the American Psychoanalytic Association.

== Criticism ==
Criticism of the training analysis in its latter-day developed form continues to materialize. Adam Phillips quipped that "Psychoanalytic training became a symptom from which a lot of people never recovered"; Juliet Mitchell considered that it fossilised and froze the analysed in an identification with the analyst.

Based on Lacan's criticism and its developments in France within Paris Psychoanalytic Society and French Psychoanalytical Association, the International Psychoanalytic Association included new training models, like the French and the Uruguayan models, added to the traditional Eitingon model of the "Training analysis" (introduced by Max Eitingon in the early 1920s). The French model, making no distinction between training analysis and therapeutic analysis, is a model in which the personal psychoanalysis is mostly independent from the institutional application of the candidate, and therefore takes place prior to the institutional training. The training in Paris Psychoanalytic Society is a typical example of this model.

== See also ==
- Lay analysis
- American Psychoanalytic Association
