= Supervised psychoanalysis =

Type of psychoanalytic treatment

A supervised psychoanalysis or psychoanalysis under supervision is a form of psychoanalytic treatment in which the psychoanalyst afterwards discusses the psychological content of the treatment, both manifest and latent, with a senior, more experienced colleague.

The analyst who provides the supervision is called a supervising analyst (or less frequently supervisory analyst).

== Training ==
Since 1925, supervised analyses have been a mandatory part of an aspiring analyst's psychoanalytic training within the International Psychoanalytical Association; and most training institutes ascribe great value to the experience of such an individual relationship about an analytic relationship.

A similar system was adopted after 1948 by the Society of Analytical Psychology.

The danger of uncritically applying insights drawn from the supervision directly to the analysis is however also recognised; and some would stress the importance of developing one's own internal supervisor, as opposed to merely reproducing someone else's thinking in the session.

== Length ==
The term "supervised analysis" is flexible. It can be applied to such treatment lasting over several years or to a single session; while even practicing analysts will sometimes seek supervision and discuss a challenging case with a senior colleague, or resort to ongoing supervision at times of analytic difficulty.

== See also ==
- Countertransference
- Little Hans
- Training analysis
