= Czech names in space =

Several space objects and features have been named after Czech people or things in Czechia. These include planetary features on Mars and Venus, asteroids and exoplanets.

== Moon ==
- Anděl (crater)
- Bečvář (crater)
- Biela (crater)
- C. Mayer (crater)
- Freud (crater)
- Hagecius (crater)
- Heinrich (crater)
- Heyrovsky (crater)
- Littrow (crater)
- Oppolzer (crater)
- Palisa (crater)
- Rheita (crater)
- Weinek (crater)

== Mars ==
- Cheb crater
- Tábor crater

== Venus ==
- Cori crater
- Hanka crater
- Julie crater
- Němcová crater
- Vlasta crater

== Asteroids ==
- 7796 Járacimrman

=== 951 Gaspra ===
- Carlsbad crater
- Mariánské Lázně crater

== Exoplanets ==
- Makropulos
