= An Outline of Psychoanalysis =

Posthumous book by Sigmund Freud

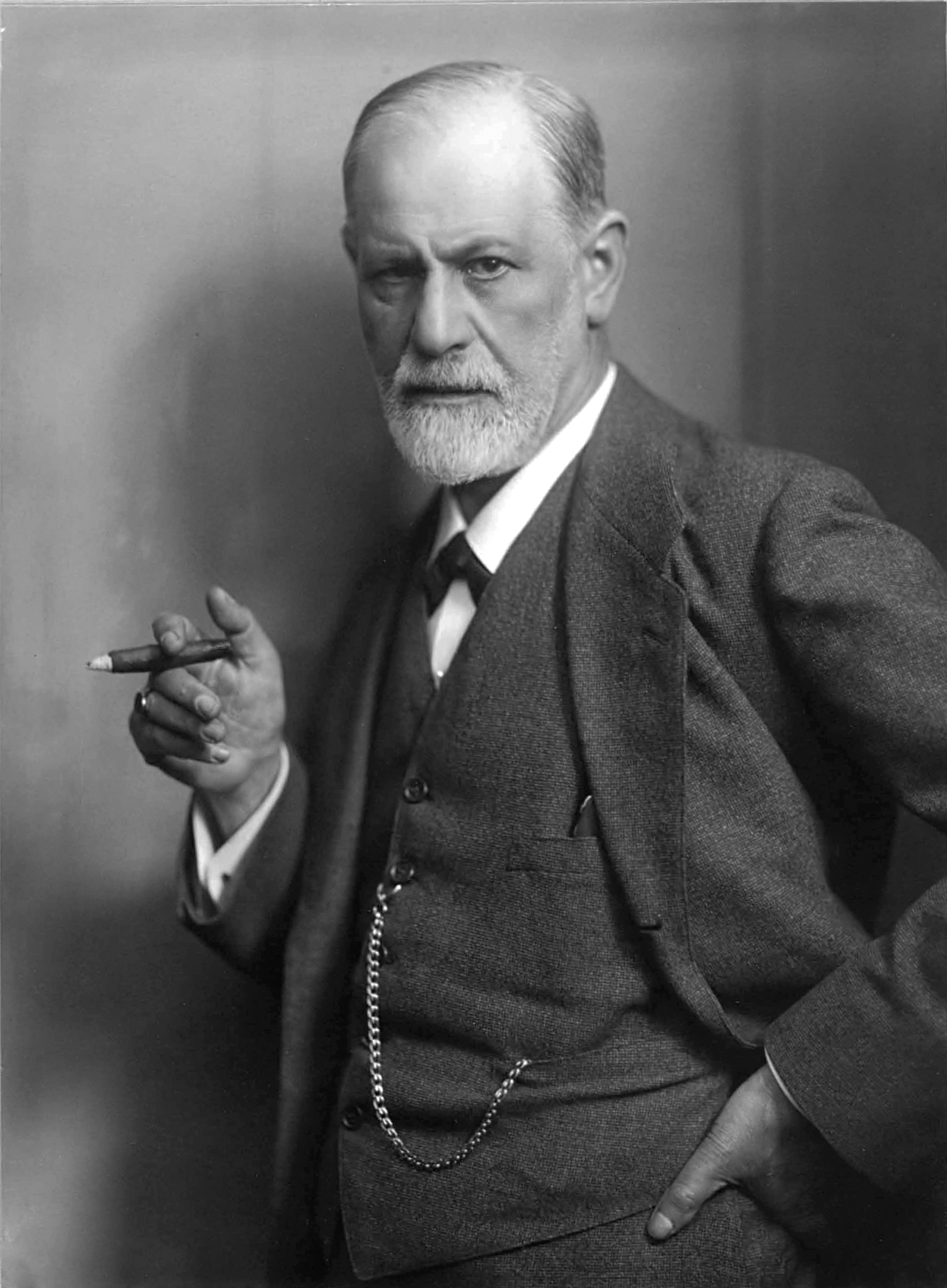
An Outline of Psychoanalysis was the last major work written by Sigmund Freud, published in 1940 (a year after his death).

An Outline of Psychoanalysis is a work by Sigmund Freud. Returning to an earlier project of providing an overview of psychoanalysis, Freud began writing this work in Vienna in 1938 as he was waiting to leave for London. By September 1938, he had written three-quarters of the book, which were published together in 1940, a year after his death. James Strachey writes that while "the Outline must be described as unfinished ... it is difficult to regard it as incomplete," given its fairly comprehensive treatment of the subject matter.

== Outline ==
In the work's preface, Freud argues that the purpose of the Outline is to "bring together the tenets of psycho-analysis and to state them, as it were, dogmatically—in the most concise form and in the most unequivocal terms."

Composed of three sections, the works opens with a description of the psychic apparatus, including its spatial organization and differentiation into agencies. The ego, which develops through contact with the outside world, attempts to reconcile the needs of the id, the superego, and reality. The id represents the hereditary past, whereas the superego represents tradition. Drives, which are basically conservative and located in the id, represent somatic needs for the psyche. Eros and the destruction, or death, impulse, whether antagonists or combined in biological functions, are the two fundamental impulses.

In the work's second part, Freud discusses the "technique" of psychoanalysis. Freud then presents an example of how psychoanalysis can be used in practice.

In the work's third part, Freud discusses the relationship between the preconscious, conscious, and unconscious and the external world. He then discusses the nature of the "internal world" of the mind.
