= Psychic apparatus =

Mental structures and mechanisms of the psyche

In psychoanalytic theory, the term psychic apparatus (also psychical apparatus, mental apparatus) refers to the mental structures and mechanisms of the psyche. In Freud's 'topographical' model of the psyche, it refers to three systems – the Unconscious, the Pre-conscious, and the Conscious. In his later 'structural model', Freud described the psychic apparatus in terms of the id, ego and super-ego.

== Definitions ==
The apparatus, as defined by Freud, includes pre-conscious, conscious, and unconscious components. Regarding this, Freud stated:

We assume that mental life is the function of an apparatus to which we ascribe the characteristics of being extended in space and of being made up of several portions [Id, ego and super-ego].

— Freud, An Outline of Psychoanalysis (1940)

As a psychologist, Sigmund Freud used the German terms psychischer Apparat and seelischer Apparat, about the functioning of which he elaborates:

We picture the unknown apparatus, which serves the activities of the mind, as being really like an instrument constructed of several parts (which we speak of as 'agencies'), each of which performs a particular function, and which have a fixed, spatial relation to one another: it being understood that by 'spatial relation'—'in front of' and 'behind', 'superficial' and 'deep'—we merely mean, in the first instance, a representation of the regular succession of the functions.

— Freud, The Question of Lay Analysis (1926).

Freud proposed the psychic apparatus as solely a theoretic construct explaining the functioning of the mind, and not a neurologic structure of the brain.

It is a hypothesis, like so many others in the sciences: the very earliest ones have always been rather rough. 'Open to revision', we can say in such cases ... the value of a 'fiction' of this kind ... depends on how much one can achieve with its help.

— Freud, The Question of Lay Analysis (1926)

Freud's model was not concerned with describing psychic life in terms of physical substance:

That is not a subject of psychological interest. Psychology can be as indifferent to it as, for instance, optics can be to the question of whether the walls of a telescope are made of metal or cardboard. We shall leave entirely to one side the material line of approach.

— Freud, The Question of Lay Analysis (1926)

The psychic apparatus controls the relationship between apparatuses within the unconscious (neural, language, and memory), the basic drives of the person, and the constant stream of stimuli emanating from the external world on a day-to-day basis. Though seemingly related, it was never specified by Freud whether the introduction of the Id, ego, and superego was intended to replace or expand the psychoanalytic model of the psychic apparatus. It has been theorized that it may have been a temporary placeholder prior to the conception and public introduction of ideas such as the id, ego, and superego, making it a foundation upon which Freud could further his expansion of a physiological and mental correspondence in relation to human functioning. However, the most commonly held belief within the psychoanalytic community is that the model of the psychic apparatus was intended by Freud to be the "whole" in which many parts- such as the id, ego, and superego- function throughout, in search of pleasure and avoidance of pain. This following of the pleasure principle is seen to be a “central element in the organization and structuring of the psychic apparatus.” Psychoanalyst and theorist Hans Loewald argued that the interactions between the external world and our internal systems -such as the psychic apparatus and ego- lead from being fluid systems to highly differentiated systems.
