= The History of the Psychoanalytic Movement =

- The 1924 German edition
- Author: Sigmund Freud
- Original title: Zur Geschichte der psychoanalytischen Bewegung
- Translator: A.A. Brill (English version)
- Language: German
- Subject: Psychoanalysis
- Published: Journal article (German): 1914; Book (English translation): 1917; Book (German): 1924
- Media type: Print

The History of the Psychoanalytic Movement is the 1917 English translation of a 1914 German article (German: Zur Geschichte der psychoanalytischen Bewegung) by Sigmund Freud, the founder of psychoanalysis. It was later published as a separate work in German in 1924.

== Content ==
Freud's work was primarily intended as a polemic against the competing theories in psychotherapy which opposed his psychoanalysis—particularly Alfred Adler's individual psychology and Carl Jung's analytical psychology. Adler and Jung had previously been followers of Freud but disagreed with his emphasis on sexual matters. Freud's main criticism of them was their continued use of the term "psychoanalyst" despite having deviated from his core principles.

== Sources ==
- Freud, S. (1914), "Zur Geschichte der psychoanalytischen Bewegung", Jahrbuch der Psychoanalyse, Vol.6, pp.207-260.
- Freud, S. (Brill, A.A. trans.) (1917), Nervous and Mental Disease Monograph Series No.25: The History of the Psychoanalytic Movement, New York, NY: New York Nervous and Mental Disease Publishing Company.
- Freud, S. (1924), Zur Geschichte der psychoanalytischen Bewegung, Leipzig: Internationaler Psychoanalytischer Verlag.
