= Freud (crater) =

Crater on the Moon

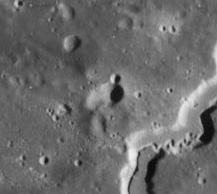
- Lunar Orbiter 4 image
- Coordinates: 24.5°N 52.3°W
- Diameter: 2.85 km (1.77 mi)
- Depth: Unknown
- Colongitude: 53° at sunrise
- Eponym: Sigmund Freud

Freud is a tiny lunar impact crater that lies on a plateau within the Oceanus Procellarum, in the northwest part of the Moon's near side. It is located a few kilometers to the west of the Vallis Schröteri, a large, sinuous valley that begins to the north of the crater Herodotus, then meanders north, then northwest, and finally southwest, until it reaches the edge of the lunar mare.

This formation is named after Austrian psychoanalyst Sigmund Freud (1856-1939). Its designation was formally adopted in 1973 by the International Astronomical Union.
