= Sigmund Freud =

Austrian neurologist and founder of psychoanalysis (1856–1939)

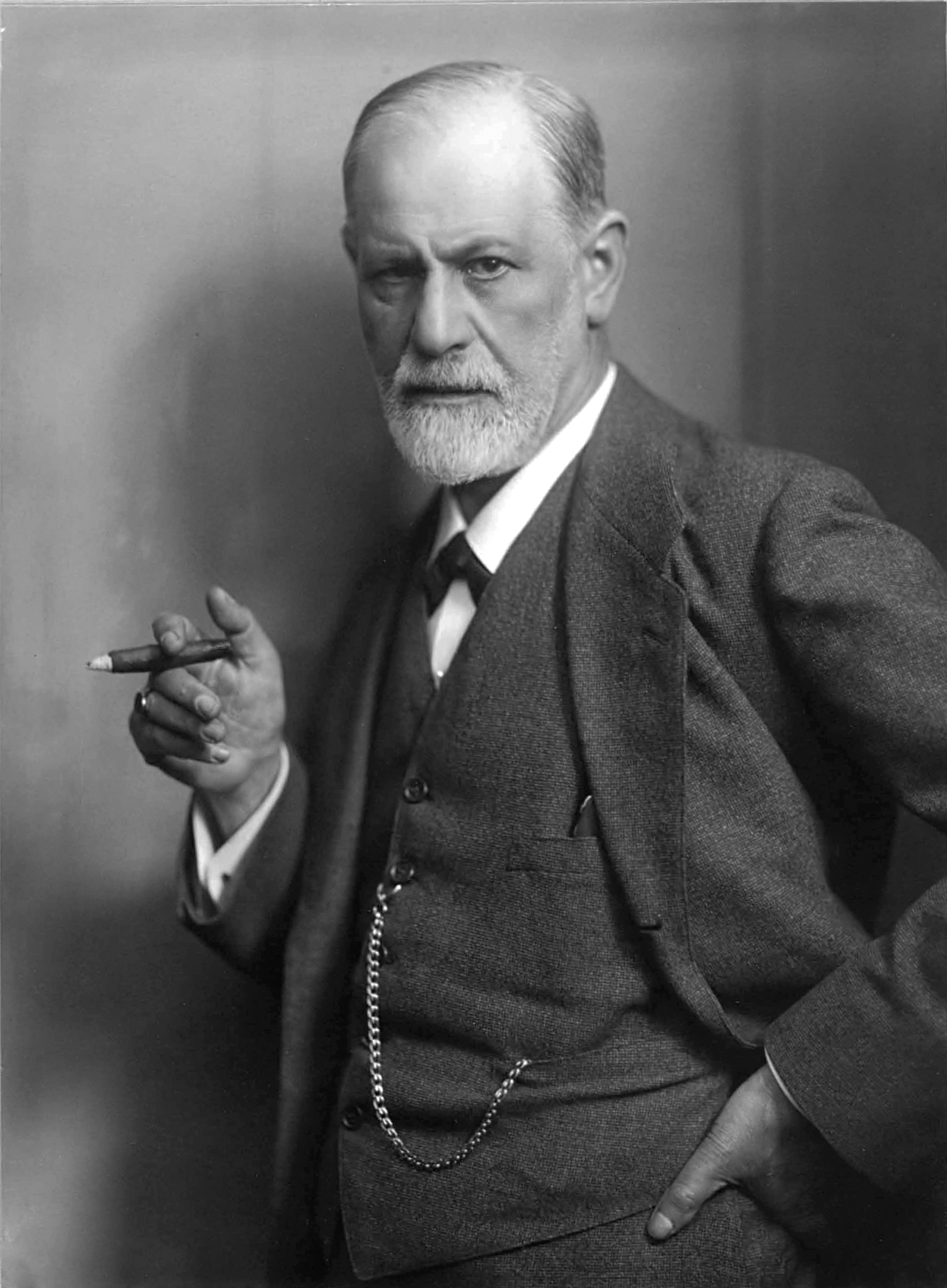
- Freud, c. 1921
- Born: Sigismund Schlomo Freud; 6 May 1856; Freiberg in Mähren, Austrian Empire
- Died: 23 September 1939 (aged 83); Hampstead, London, England
- Resting place: Freud Corner
- Education: University of Vienna (MD)
- Known for: Psychoanalysis, including the theories of id, ego and superego, Oedipus complex, repression, defence mechanisms, stages of psychosexual development
- Spouse: Martha Bernays (m. 1886)
- Children: 6, including Ernst and Anna
- Parents: Jakob Freud (father); Amalia Nathanson (mother)
- Awards: Goethe Prize (1930)
- Scientific career
- Fields: Neurology; psychotherapy; psychoanalysis
- Workplaces: University of Vienna; International Psychoanalytical Association
- Academic advisors: Franz Brentano; Ernst Brücke; Carl Claus
- Freud's voice Freud reflects on his achievements as a neurologist Recorded 27 December 1938

Sigmund Freud (Note: /frɔɪd/ FROYD; Austrian German: [ˈziːgmʊnd ˈfrɔʏd]) (born Sigismund Schlomo Freud; 6 May 1856 – 23 September 1939) was an Austrian neurologist and the founder of psychoanalysis, a clinical method for evaluating and treating pathologies arising from conflicts in the psyche through dialogue between patient and psychoanalyst, and the distinctive theory of mind and human agency it posits.

In creating psychoanalysis, Freud introduced therapeutic methods such as free association, the interpretation of dreams, and the analysis of transference phenomena that arise in the clinical setting. Freud's redefinition of sexuality to include infantile stages led him to formulate the Oedipus complex as a central tenet of psychoanalytical theory. His analysis of dreams as wish fulfillments provided him with models for the clinical analysis of symptom formation and the underlying mechanisms of repression. Accordingly, on this basis, Freud elaborated his theory of the unconscious and went on to develop a model of psychic structure comprising id, ego, and superego. Freud postulated the existence of libido (sexualised psychic energy), with which mental processes and structures are invested and that generates erotic attachments and a death drive, the source of compulsive repetition, hate, aggression, and neurotic guilt. In his later work, Freud developed a wide-ranging interpretation and critique of religion and culture.

Though less prevalent in diagnostic and clinical practice, psychoanalysis remains influential within psychology, psychiatry, psychotherapy, and across the humanities. It thus continues to generate debate concerning its therapeutic efficacy, its scientific status, and whether it advances or hinders the feminist cause. Nonetheless, Freud's work has suffused contemporary Western thought and popular culture. W. H. Auden's 1940 poetic tribute to Freud describes him as "no more a person now but a whole climate of opinion / under whom we conduct our different lives".

== Biography ==
=== Early life and education ===
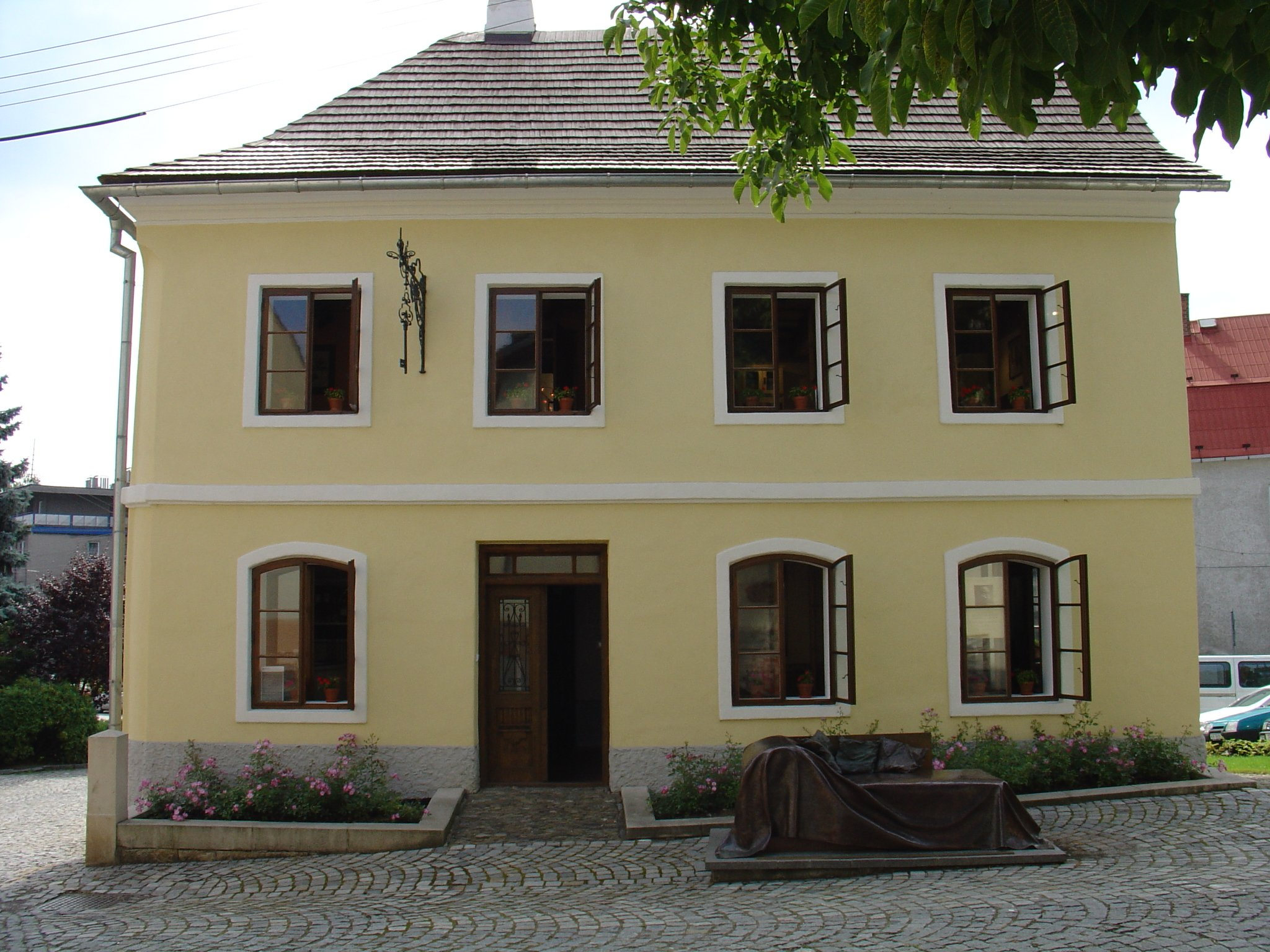
Freud's birthplace, a rented room in a locksmith's house, Freiberg, Austrian Empire (Příbor, Czech Republic)

Sigmund Freud was born to Ashkenazi Jewish parents in the Moravian town of Freiberg, in the Austrian Empire (now Příbor, Czech Republic), the first of eight children. Both of his parents were from Galicia. His father, Jakob Freud, a wool merchant, had two sons, Emanuel and Philipp, from his first marriage. Jakob's family were Hasidic Jews and, although Jakob himself had moved away from the tradition, he came to be known for his Torah study. He and Freud's mother, Amalia Nathansohn, who was 20 years younger and his third wife, were married by Rabbi Isaac Noah Mannheimer on 29 July 1855. They were struggling financially and living in a rented room, in a locksmith's house at Schlossergasse 117 when their son Sigmund was born. He was born with a caul, which his mother saw as a positive omen for the boy's future.

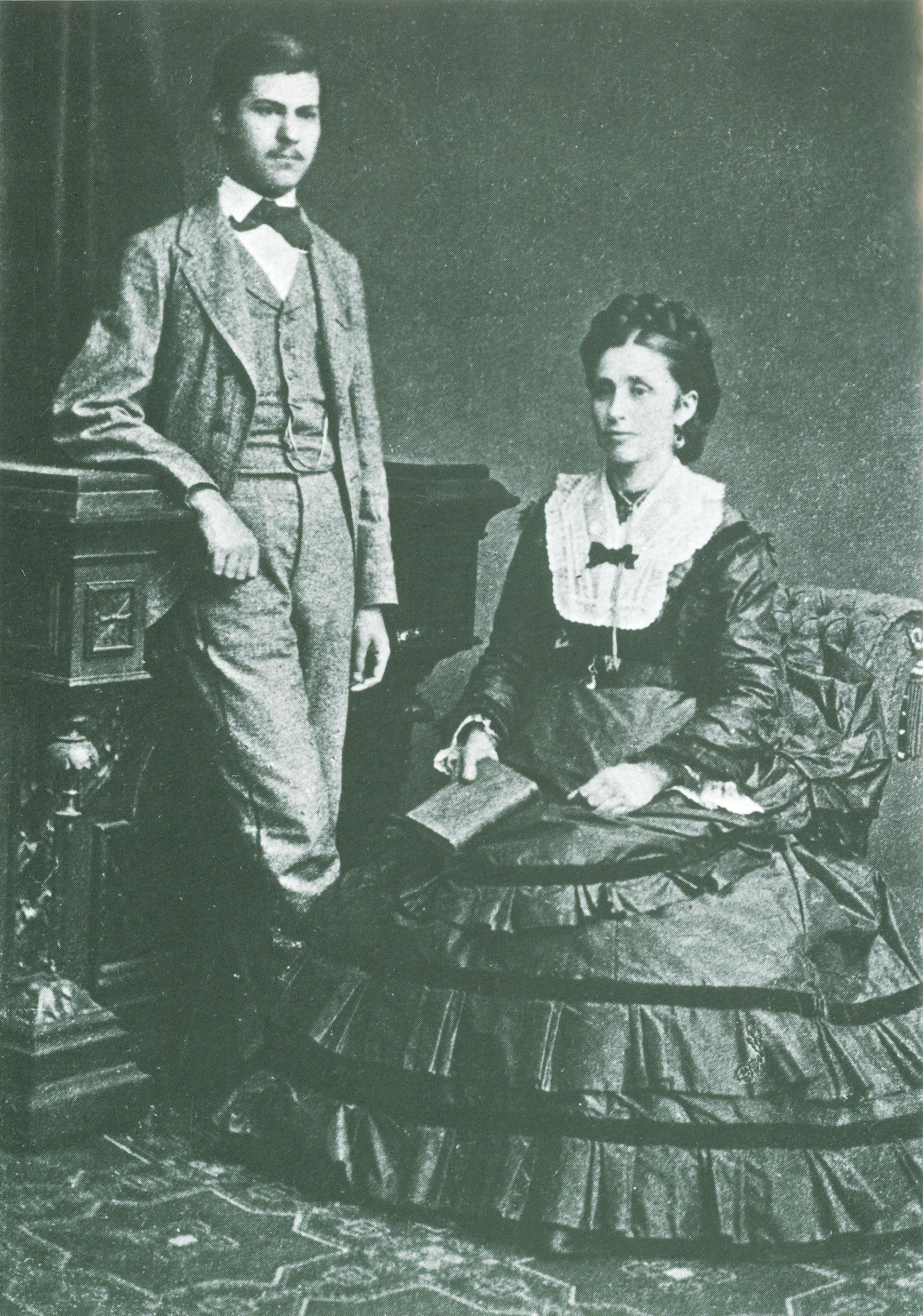
Freud (aged 16) and his mother, Amalia, in 1872

In 1859, the Freud family left Freiberg. Freud's half-brothers emigrated to Manchester, England, parting him from the "inseparable" playmate of his early childhood, Emanuel's son, John. Jakob Freud took his wife and two children (Freud's sister, Anna, was born in 1858; a brother, Julius, born in 1857, had died in infancy) firstly to Leipzig and then in 1860 to Vienna, where four sisters and a brother were born: Rosa (b. 1860), Marie (b. 1861), Adolfine (b. 1862), Paula (b. 1864), Alexander (b. 1866). In 1865 the family's standing was damaged when Jakob Freud's brother Josef was arrested on suspicion of dealing in counterfeit rubles; he was convicted the following year and sentenced to ten years' imprisonment. Police inquiries reportedly pointed towards Manchester, where Jakob's elder sons Emanuel and Philipp were living, although the two were not named in the proceedings. Freud later recalled that the affair caused his father's hair to turn grey within a few days. In 1865, the nine-year-old Freud entered the Leopoldstädter Kommunal-Realgymnasium (later known as Sperlgymnasium), a prominent high school in Vienna. He proved to be an outstanding pupil and graduated with the Matura in 1873 with honors, entering the University of Vienna that same year at age 17. He loved literature and was proficient in German, French, Italian, Spanish, English, Hebrew, Latin and Greek. Until shortly before graduating high school, Freud had planned to study law. If not for attending a public lecture where Goethe's essay "Nature" (Die Natur) was read aloud, Freud would have never initially pursued medicine upon enrolling at University of Vienna.

At the university, his studies included philosophy under Franz Brentano, physiology under Ernst Brücke, and zoology under Darwinist professor Carl Claus. In a letter to a friend written in 1874, Freud writes "under Brentano's influence especially (which has had a maturing effect), I have made a decision to sit for the doctorate in philosophy and will study philosophy and zoology." True to his word, Freud spent four weeks at Claus's zoological research station in Trieste, dissecting hundreds of eels in an inconclusive search for their male reproductive organs in 1876. In 1877, Freud moved to Ernst Brücke's physiology laboratory, where he spent six years comparing the brains of humans with those of other vertebrates such as frogs, lampreys, as well as invertebrates such as crayfish. In fact, Freud's research work on the biology of nervous tissue proved seminal for the subsequent discovery of the neuron in the 1890s. Freud's research work was interrupted in 1879 by the obligation to undertake a year's compulsory military service. The lengthy downtimes enabled him complete Brentano and Theodor Gomperz's commission to translate the twelfth volume of the Complete Works of John Stuart Mill, which contained "On the Emancipation of Women," "Plato," "The Social Question," and "Socialism." Finally, Freud graduated with an MD in March 1881.

=== Early career and marriage ===
In 1882, Freud began his medical career as a medical researcher and clinical assistant at Vienna General Hospital. During his time at Vienna General Hospital, Freud worked in various departments. Most importantly, his time spent in Theodor Meynert's psychiatric clinic and as a locum in a local asylum led to an increased interest in clinical work. His research work in cerebral anatomy led to the publication in 1884 of an influential paper on the palliative effects of cocaine, and his work on aphasia would form the basis of his first book On Aphasia: A Critical Study, published in 1891. Freud's substantial body of published research between 1882 and 1885 also led to his appointment as a university lecturer or docent in neuropathology in 1885, a non-salaried post but one that entitled him to give lectures at the University of Vienna.

In 1886, Freud resigned his hospital post and entered private practice, specializing in "nervous disorders". The same year, he married Martha Bernays, the granddaughter of Isaac Bernays, a chief rabbi in Hamburg. Freud was, as an atheist, dismayed at the requirement in Austria for a Jewish religious ceremony and briefly considered, before dismissing, the prospect of joining the Protestant 'Confession' to avoid one. A civil ceremony for Bernays and Freud took place on 13 September, and a religious ceremony took place the following day, with Freud having been hastily tutored in the Hebrew prayers. The Freuds had six children: Mathilde (b. 1887), Jean-Martin (b. 1889), Oliver (b. 1891), Ernst (b. 1892), Sophie (b. 1893), and Anna (b. 1895). From 1891 until they left Vienna in 1938, Freud and his family lived in an apartment at Berggasse 19, near Innere Stadt.

On 8 December 1897, Freud was initiated into the German Jewish cultural association B'nai B'rith, to which he remained linked all his life. Freud gave a speech on the interpretation of dreams, which had an enthusiastic reception. It anticipated the book of the same name, which was published two years later.

Freud's Jewish origins and his allegiance to his secular Jewish identity were significant in the formation of his intellectual and moral outlook, especially concerning his intellectual non-conformism, as he pointed out in his Autobiographical Study. They would also have a substantial effect on the content of psychoanalytic ideas, particularly in respect of their common concerns with depth interpretation and "the bounding of desire by law".

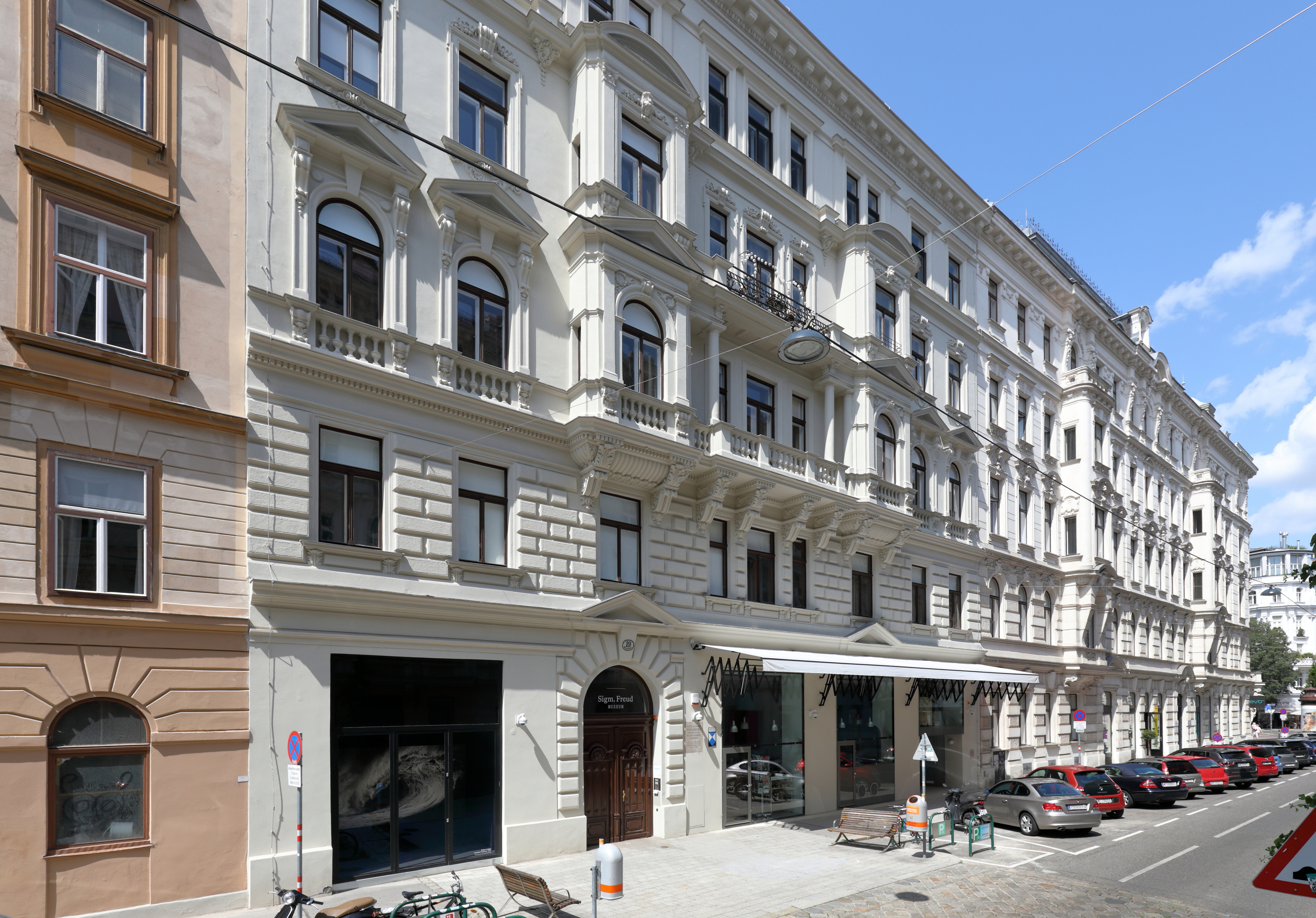
Freud's home at Berggasse 19, Vienna

In 1896, Minna Bernays, Martha Freud's sister, became a permanent member of the Freud household after the death of her fiancé. "[A] paper published in 1969 by John M. Billinsky contained the transcript of a conversation he had with [Carl] Jung in 1957, in which Jung confided that ... Minna herself had told him about her affair with Freud". Peter J. Swales writes that Jung confided about his affair "not only to John Billinsky, but also ... to his confidant Carl Meier and his own lover Antonia Wolff". Swales also makes a case that Freud impregnated Minna and arranged an abortion for her.

In addition, Franz Maciejewski presents as evidence of the affair the discovery of a Swiss hotel guest book entry for 13 August 1898, signed by Freud "Dr. Sigm. Freud & wife" while travelling with his sister-in-law. In Freud: The Making of an Illusion, however, Frederick Crews, though he agrees with Swales that Freud and Minna were having sexual relations and that a pregnancy and an abortion resulted, discounts the significance of the fact that Freud signed the hotel guest book as Dr. and wife, because "Swiss hotels at the time would have refused to accommodate an openly unmarried couple".

Freud began smoking tobacco at age 24; initially a cigarette smoker, he became a cigar smoker. He believed smoking enhanced his capacity to work and that he could moderate it by exercising self-control. Despite health warnings from colleague Wilhelm Fliess, he remained a smoker, eventually developing buccal cancer. In November 1923, hoping to check the recurrence of his cancer and to restore his vigour, Freud underwent a Steinach operation, a vasoligature then widely believed to have rejuvenating effects. Freud suggested to Fliess in 1897 that addictions, including tobacco, were substitutes for masturbation, "the one great habit".

Freud had greatly admired his philosophy tutor, Franz Brentano, who was known for his theories of perception and introspection. Brentano discussed the possible existence of the unconscious mind in his Psychology from an Empirical Standpoint (1874). Although Brentano denied its existence, his discussion of the unconscious probably helped introduce Freud to the concept. Freud owned and made use of Charles Darwin's major evolutionary writings and was also influenced by Eduard von Hartmann's The Philosophy of the Unconscious (1869). Other texts of importance to Freud were by Fechner and Herbart, with the latter's Psychology as Science perhaps of underrated significance in this respect. Freud also drew on the work of Theodor Lipps, who was one of the main contemporary theorists of the concepts of the unconscious and empathy.

Though Freud was reluctant to associate his psychoanalytic insights with prior philosophical theories, similarities between his work and that of both Schopenhauer and Nietzsche have been noted. In 1908, Freud said that he occasionally read Nietzsche and was strongly fascinated by his writings, but did not study him, because he found Nietzsche's "intuitive insights" resembled his own work at the time too much, and also because he was overwhelmed by the "wealth of ideas" he encountered when he read Nietzsche. Freud sometimes would deny the influence of Nietzsche's ideas. Historian Paul Roazen quotes Peter L. Rudnytsky, who wrote that, based on Freud's correspondence with his adolescent friend Eduard Silberstein, Freud read Nietzsche's The Birth of Tragedy and probably the first two of the Untimely Meditations when he was seventeen. Freud bought Nietzsche's collected works in 1900, telling Wilhelm Fliess that he hoped to find in Nietzsche's works "the words for much that remains mute in me". Later, however, he said he had not yet opened them. Freud came to treat Nietzsche's writings, according to Peter Gay, "as texts to be resisted far more than to be studied". His interest in philosophy declined after he decided on a career in neurology.

Freud read William Shakespeare in English; his understanding of human psychology may have been influenced by Shakespeare's plays.

=== Relationship with Fliess ===
During the formative period of his work, Freud valued and came to rely on the intellectual and emotional support of his friend Wilhelm Fliess, a Berlin-based ear, nose, and throat specialist whom he had first met in 1887. Both men saw themselves as isolated from the prevailing clinical and theoretical mainstream because of their ambitions to develop radical new theories of sexuality. Fliess developed highly eccentric theories of human biorhythms and a nasogenital connection which are today considered pseudoscientific. He shared Freud's views on the importance of certain aspects of sexuality – masturbation, coitus interruptus, and the use of condoms – in the etiology of what was then called the "actual neuroses", primarily neurasthenia and certain physically manifested anxiety symptoms. They maintained an extensive correspondence from which Freud drew on Fliess's speculations on infantile sexuality and bisexuality to elaborate and revise his own ideas. His first attempt at a systematic theory of the mind, his Project for a Scientific Psychology, was developed as a metapsychology with Fliess as interlocutor. However, Freud's efforts to build a bridge between neurology and psychology were eventually abandoned after they had reached an impasse, as his letters to Fliess reveal, though some ideas of the Project were to be taken up again in the concluding chapter of The Interpretation of Dreams.

Freud had Fliess repeatedly operate on his nose and sinuses to treat "nasal reflex neurosis", and subsequently referred his patient Emma Eckstein to him. According to Freud, her history of symptoms included severe leg pains with consequent restricted mobility, as well as stomach and menstrual pains. These pains were, according to Fliess's theories, caused by habitual masturbation, which, as the tissue of the nose and genitalia were linked, was curable by removal of part of the middle turbinate. Fliess's surgery proved disastrous, resulting in profuse, recurrent nasal bleeding; he had left a half-metre of gauze in Eckstein's nasal cavity and its subsequent removal left her permanently disfigured. At first, though aware of Fliess's culpability and regarding the remedial surgery with horror, Freud could bring himself only to intimate delicately in his correspondence with Fliess the nature of his disastrous role, and in subsequent letters maintained a tactful silence on the matter or else returned to the face-saving topic of Eckstein's hysteria. Freud ultimately, in light of Eckstein's history of adolescent self-cutting and irregular nasal (and menstrual) bleeding, concluded that Fliess was "completely without blame", as Eckstein's post-operative haemorrhages were hysterical "wish-bleedings" linked to "an old wish to be loved in her illness" and triggered as a means of "rearousing [Freud's] affection". Eckstein nonetheless continued her analysis with Freud. She was restored to full mobility and went on to practice psychoanalysis herself.

Freud, who had called Fliess "the Kepler of biology", later concluded that a combination of a homoerotic attachment and the residue of his "specifically Jewish mysticism" lay behind his loyalty to his Jewish friend and his consequent overestimation of both his theoretical and clinical work. Their friendship came to an acrimonious end with Fliess angry at Freud's unwillingness to endorse his general theory of sexual periodicity and accusing him of collusion in the plagiarism of his work. After Fliess failed to respond to Freud's offer of collaboration over the publication of his Three Essays on the Theory of Sexuality in 1906, their relationship came to an end.

=== Development of psychoanalysis ===
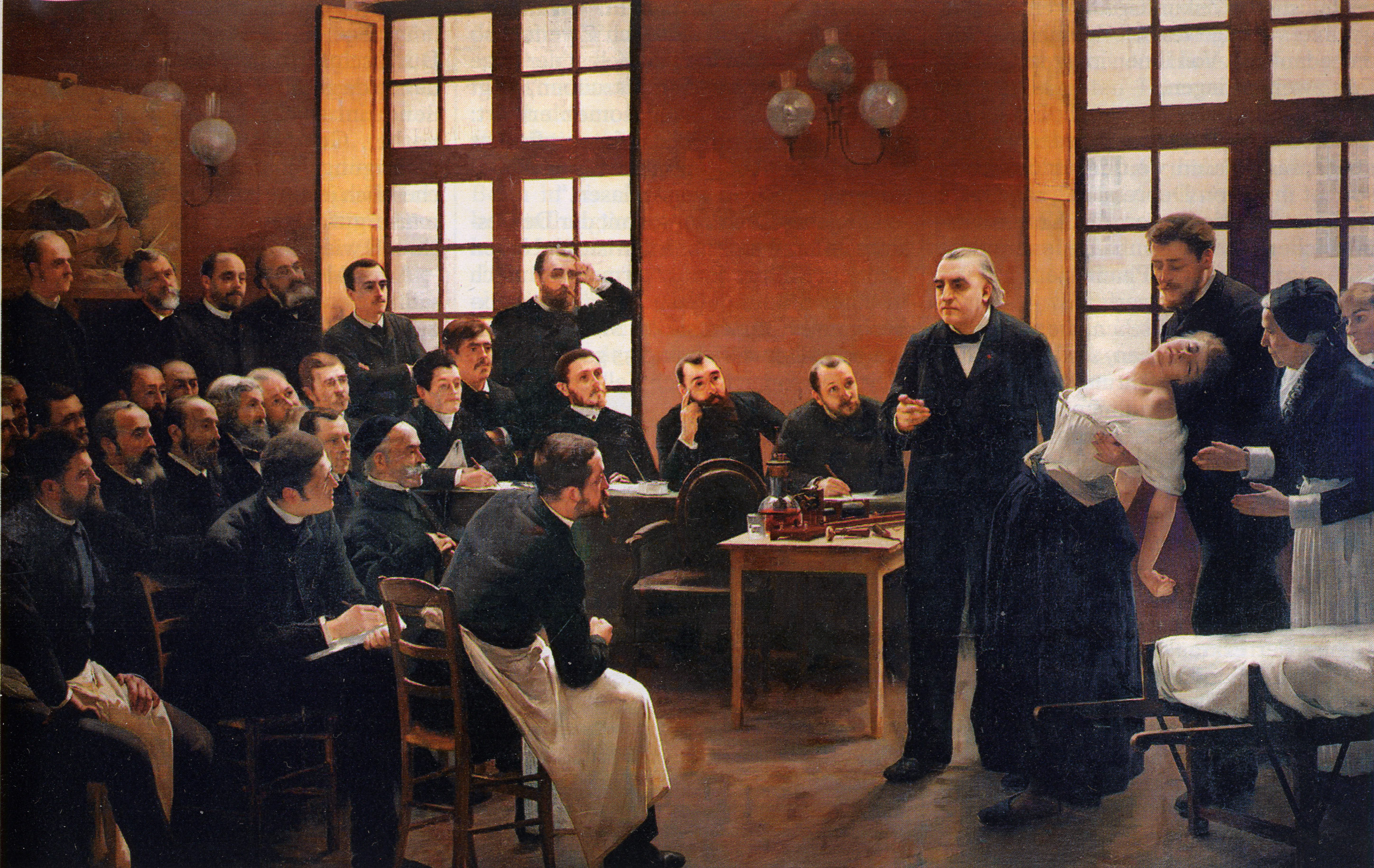
André Brouillet's A Clinical Lesson at the Salpêtrière (1887) depicting a Charcot demonstration. Freud had a lithograph of this painting placed over the couch in his consulting rooms.

In October 1885, Freud went to Paris on a three-month fellowship to study with Jean-Martin Charcot, a renowned neurologist who was conducting scientific research into hypnosis. He was later to recall the experience of this stay as catalytic in turning him toward the practice of medical psychopathology and away from a less financially promising career in neurology research. Charcot specialized in the study of hysteria and susceptibility to hypnosis, which he frequently demonstrated with patients on stage in front of an audience.

Once he had set up in private practice in Vienna in 1886, Freud began using hypnosis in his clinical work. He adopted the approach of his friend and collaborator, Josef Breuer, in a type of hypnosis that was different from the French methods he had studied, in that it did not use suggestion. The treatment of one particular patient of Breuer's proved to be transformative for Freud's clinical practice. Described as Anna O., she was invited to talk about her symptoms while under hypnosis (she would coin the phrase "talking cure"). Her symptoms became reduced in severity as she retrieved memories of traumatic incidents associated with their onset.

The inconsistent results of Freud's early clinical work eventually led him to abandon hypnosis, having concluded that more consistent and effective symptom relief could be achieved by encouraging patients to talk freely, without censorship or inhibition, about whatever ideas or memories occurred to them. He called this procedure "free association". In conjunction with this, Freud found that patients' dreams could be fruitfully analyzed to reveal the complex structuring of unconscious material and to demonstrate the psychic action of repression which, he had concluded, underlay symptom formation. By 1896, he was using the term "psychoanalysis" to refer to his new clinical method and the theories on which it was based.

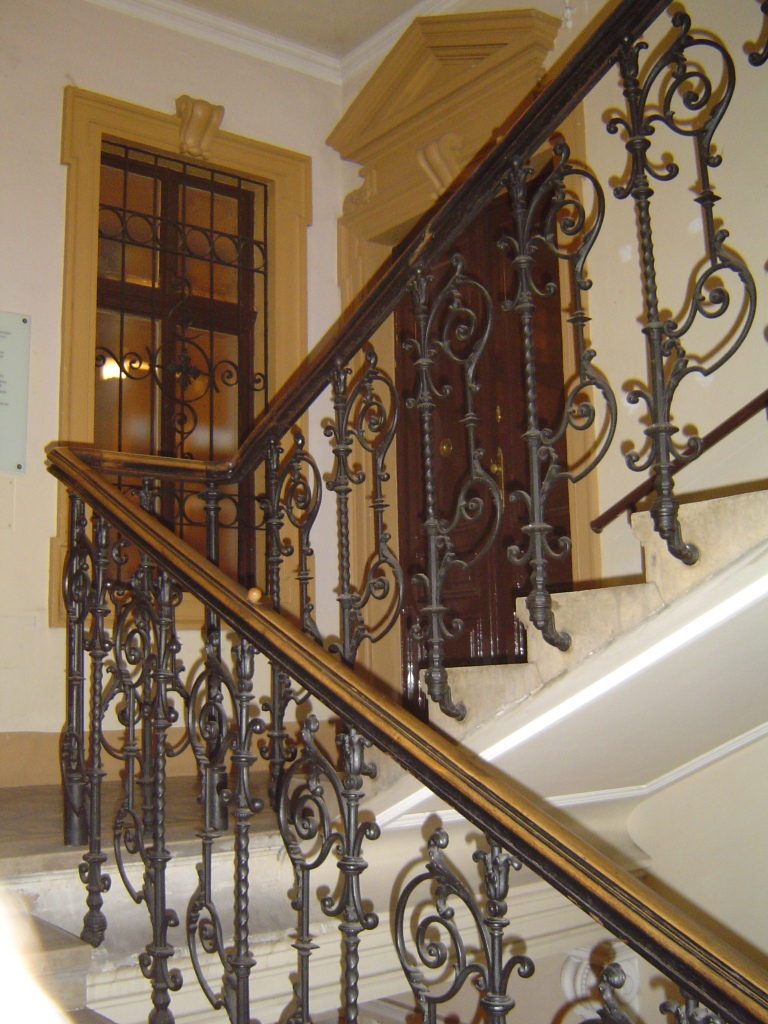
Approach to Freud's consulting rooms at Berggasse 19

Freud's development of these new theories took place during a period in which he experienced heart irregularities, disturbing dreams, and periods of depression — a "neurasthenia" that he linked to the death of his father in 1896 and that prompted a "self-analysis" of his own dreams and memories of childhood. His explorations of his feelings of hostility to his father and rivalrous jealousy over his mother's affections led him to fundamentally revise his theory of the origin of the neuroses.

Based on his early clinical work, Freud postulated that unconscious memories of sexual molestation in early childhood were a necessary precondition for psychoneuroses (hysteria and obsessional neurosis), a formulation now known as Freud's seduction theory. In the light of his self-analysis, Freud abandoned the theory that every neurosis can be traced back to the effects of infantile sexual abuse, now arguing that infantile sexual scenarios still had a causative function. It did not matter whether they were real or imagined, and in either case, they became pathogenic only when acting as repressed memories.

This transition from the theory of infantile sexual trauma as a general explanation of how all neuroses originate to one that presupposes autonomous infantile sexuality provided the basis for Freud's subsequent formulation of the theory of the Oedipus complex.

Freud described the evolution of his clinical method and set out his theory of the psychogenetic origins of hysteria, demonstrated in several case histories, in Studies on Hysteria published in 1895 (co-authored with Josef Breuer). In 1899, he published The Interpretation of Dreams in which, following a critical review of existing theory, Freud gives detailed interpretations of his own and his patients' dreams in terms of wish-fulfillments made subject to the repression and censorship of the "dream-work". He then sets out the theoretical model of mental structure (the unconscious, pre-conscious, and conscious) on which this account is based. An abridged version, On Dreams, was published in 1901. In works that would win him a more general readership, Freud applied his theories outside the clinical setting in The Psychopathology of Everyday Life (1901) and Jokes and their Relation to the Unconscious (1905). In Three Essays on the Theory of Sexuality, published in 1905, Freud elaborates his theory of infantile sexuality, describing its "polymorphous perverse" forms and the functioning of the "drives", to which it gives rise, in the formation of sexual identity. The same year he published Fragment of an Analysis of a Case of Hysteria, which became one of his more famous and controversial case studies. Known as the 'Dora' case study, for Freud it was illustrative of hysteria as a symptom and contributed to his understanding of the importance of transference as a clinical phenomenon. In other early case studies, Freud described the symptomatology of obsessional neurosis in the case of the Rat man, and phobia in the case of Little Hans.

=== Early followers ===
In 1902, Freud at last realised his long-standing ambition to be made a university professor. The title "professor extraordinarius" was important to Freud for the recognition and prestige it conferred, there being no salary or teaching duties attached to the post (he would be granted the enhanced status of "professor ordinarius" in 1920). Despite support from the university, his appointment as professor extraordinarius had been blocked in successive years by the political authorities and it was secured only with the intervention of an influential ex-patient, Baroness Marie Ferstel, who (supposedly) had to bribe the minister of education with a valuable painting.

Freud continued with the regular series of lectures on his work, which, since the mid-1880s as a docent of Vienna University, he had been delivering to small audiences every Saturday evening at the lecture hall of the university's psychiatric clinic. From the autumn of 1902, four Viennese physicians who had expressed interest in Freud's work were invited to meet at his apartment every Wednesday afternoon to discuss issues relating to psychology and neuropathology. This group was called the Wednesday Psychological Society (Psychologische Mittwochs-Gesellschaft) and it marked the beginnings of the worldwide psychoanalytic movement.

Freud founded this discussion group at the suggestion of physician Wilhelm Stekel, one of the five original members. Stekel had studied medicine; his conversion to psychoanalysis is variously attributed to his successful treatment by Freud for a sexual problem or as a result of his reading The Interpretation of Dreams, to which he subsequently gave a positive review in the Viennese daily newspaper Neues Wiener Tagblatt in 1902. Another original member, Alfred Adler is often regarded as the most formidable intellect among the early Freud circle. Adler was a socialist who, in 1898, had written a health manual for the tailoring trade. He was particularly interested in the potential social impact of psychiatry.

The other two original members whom Freud invited to attend, Max Kahane and Rudolf Reitler, were also physicians and all five members were Jewish by birth. Both Kahane and Reitler were childhood friends of Freud who had gone to university with him and kept abreast of Freud's developing ideas by attending his Saturday evening lectures. In 1901, Kahane, who first introduced Stekel to Freud's work, had opened an out-patient psychotherapy institute of which he was the director in Vienna. In the same year, Kahane's medical textbook, Outline of Internal Medicine for Students and Practicing Physicians, was published. In it, he provided an outline of Freud's psychoanalytic method. Kahane broke with Freud and left the Wednesday Psychological Society in 1907 for unknown reasons, and in 1923, he died by suicide. Reitler, on the other hand, was the director of an establishment providing thermal cures in Dorotheergasse, which had been founded in 1901." He is described as "having become the world's second analyst, after Freud himself." Unfortunately, "Reitler's medical and scientific career was interrupted by a serious illness in 1914, forcing him to retire. He died at a sanatorium in Vienna in 1917."

Max Graf, a Viennese musicologist and father of "Little Hans", who had first encountered Freud in 1900 and joined the Wednesday group soon after its initial inception, described the ritual and atmosphere of the early meetings of the society:

The gatherings followed a definite ritual. First, one of the members would present a paper. Then, black coffee and cakes were served; cigars and cigarettes were on the table and were consumed in great quantities. After a social quarter of an hour, the discussion would begin. The last and decisive word was always spoken by Freud himself. There was the atmosphere of the foundation of a religion in that room. Freud himself was its new prophet who made the heretofore prevailing methods of psychological investigation appear superficial.

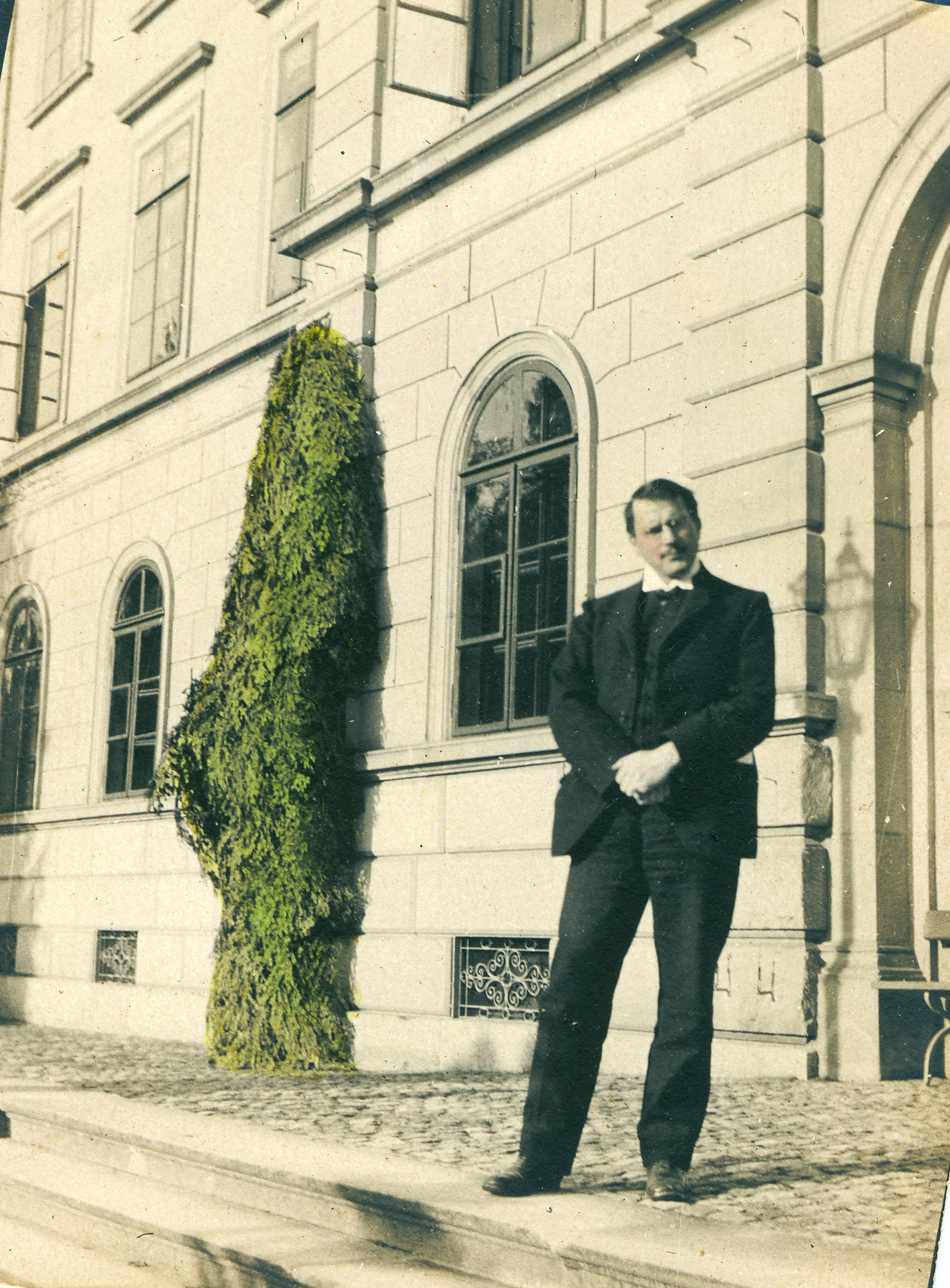
Carl Jung in 1910

By 1906, the group had grown to sixteen members, including Otto Rank, who was employed as the group's paid secretary. In the same year, Freud began a correspondence with Carl Gustav Jung, who was by then already an academically acclaimed researcher into word-association and the Galvanic Skin Response, and a lecturer at Zurich University, although still only an assistant to Eugen Bleuler at the Burghölzli Mental Hospital in Zürich. In March 1907, Jung and Ludwig Binswanger, also a Swiss psychiatrist, travelled to Vienna to visit Freud and attend the discussion group. Thereafter, they established a small psychoanalytic group in Zürich. In 1908, reflecting its growing institutional status, the Wednesday group was reconstituted as the Vienna Psychoanalytic Society with Freud as president, a position he relinquished in 1910 in favor of Adler in the hope of neutralizing his increasingly critical standpoint.

The first woman member, Margarete Hilferding, joined the Society in 1910, and the following year she was joined by Tatiana Rosenthal and Sabina Spielrein, who were both Russian psychiatrists and graduates of the Zürich University medical school. Before she completed her studies, Spielrein was a patient of Jung's at the Burghölzli, and the clinical and personal details of their relationship became the subject of an extensive correspondence between Freud and Jung. Both women would go on to make important contributions to the work of the Russian Psychoanalytic Society, founded in 1910.

Freud's early followers met together formally for the first time at the Hotel Bristol, Salzburg on 27 April 1908. This meeting, which was retrospectively deemed to be the first International Psychoanalytic Congress, was convened at the suggestion of Ernest Jones, then a London-based neurologist who had discovered Freud's writings and begun applying psychoanalytic methods in his clinical work. Jones had met Jung at a conference the previous year, and they met up again in Zürich to organize the Congress. There were, as Jones records, "forty-two present, half of whom were or became practising analysts." In addition to Jones and the Viennese and Zürich contingents accompanying Freud and Jung, also present and notable for their subsequent importance in the psychoanalytic movement were Karl Abraham and Max Eitingon from Berlin, Sándor Ferenczi from Budapest and the New York-based Abraham Brill.

Important decisions were taken at the Congress to advance the impact of Freud's work. A journal, the Jahrbuch für psychoanalytische und psychopathologische Forschungen, was launched in 1909 under the editorship of Jung. This was followed in 1910 by the monthly Zentralblatt für Psychoanalyse edited by Adler and Stekel, in 1911 by Imago, a journal devoted to the application of psychoanalysis to the field of cultural and literary studies edited by Rank and in 1913 by the Internationale Zeitschrift für Psychoanalyse, also edited by Rank. Plans for an international association of psychoanalysts were implemented at the Nuremberg Congress of 1910, where Jung was elected, with Freud's support, as its first president.

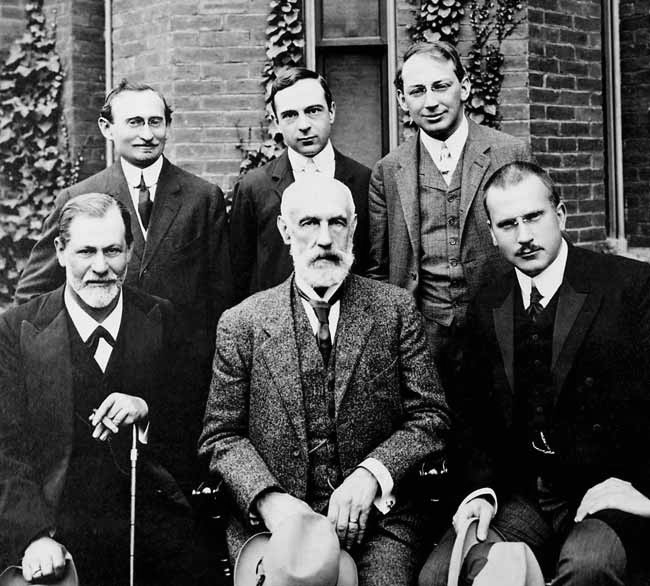
At Clark University, Worcester, Massachusetts in 1909. Front row: Freud, G. Stanley Hall, Carl Jung; back row: Abraham Brill, Ernest Jones, Sándor Ferenczi

Freud turned to Brill and Jones to further his ambition to spread the psychoanalytic cause in the English-speaking world. Both were invited to Vienna following the Salzburg Congress and a division of labour was agreed with Brill given the translation rights for Freud's works, and Jones, who was to take up a post at the University of Toronto later in the year, tasked with establishing a platform for Freudian ideas in North American academic and medical life. Jones's advocacy prepared the way for Freud's visit to the United States, accompanied by Jung and Ferenczi, in September 1909 at the invitation of Stanley Hall, president of Clark University, Worcester, Massachusetts, where he gave five lectures on psychoanalysis. This visit was cut short when Freud contracted food poisoning, resulting in these lectures being his only ones in North America.

The event, at which Freud was awarded an honorary doctorate, marked the first public recognition of Freud's work and attracted widespread media interest. Freud's audience included the distinguished neurologist and psychiatrist James Jackson Putnam, Professor of Diseases of the Nervous System at Harvard, who invited Freud to his country retreat, where they held extensive discussions over four days. Putnam's subsequent public endorsement of Freud's work represented a significant breakthrough for the psychoanalytic cause in the United States. When Putnam and Jones organised the founding of the American Psychoanalytic Association in May 1911 they were elected president and secretary respectively. Brill founded the New York Psychoanalytic Society the same year. His English translations of Freud's work began to appear in 1909.

==== Resignations from the IPA ====
Some of Freud's followers subsequently withdrew from the International Psychoanalytical Association (IPA) and founded their own schools.

From 1909, Adler's views on topics such as neurosis began to differ markedly from those held by Freud. As Adler's position appeared increasingly incompatible with Freudianism, a series of confrontations between their respective viewpoints took place at the meetings of the Viennese Psychoanalytic Society in January and February 1911. In February 1911, Adler, then the president of the society, resigned his position. At this time, Stekel also resigned from his position as vice president of the society. Adler finally left the Freudian group altogether in June 1911 to form his own organization with nine other members who had also resigned from the group. This new formation was initially called Society for Free Psychoanalysis but it was soon renamed the Society for Individual Psychology. In the period after World War I, Adler became increasingly associated with a psychological position he devised called individual psychology.

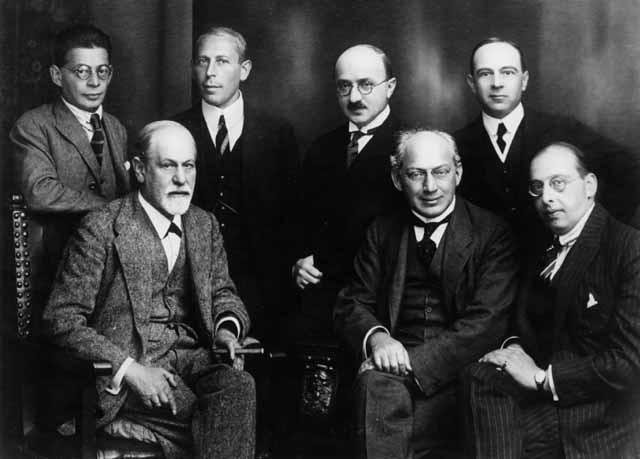
The Committee in 1922 (from left to right): Otto Rank, Sigmund Freud, Karl Abraham, Max Eitingon, Sándor Ferenczi, Ernest Jones, and Hanns Sachs

In 1912, Jung published Wandlungen und Symbole der Libido (published in English in 1916 as Psychology of the Unconscious), making it clear that his views were taking a direction quite different from those of Freud. To distinguish his system from psychoanalysis, Jung called it analytical psychology. Anticipating the final breakdown of the relationship between Freud and Jung, Ernest Jones initiated the formation of a Secret Committee of loyalists charged with safeguarding the theoretical coherence and institutional legacy of the psychoanalytic movement. Formed in the autumn of 1912, the Committee comprised Freud, Jones, Abraham, Ferenczi, Rank, and Hanns Sachs. Max Eitingon joined the Committee in 1919. Each member pledged himself not to make any public departure from the fundamental tenets of psychoanalytic theory before he had discussed his views with the others. After this development, Jung recognised that his position was untenable and resigned as editor of the Jahrbuch and then as president of the IPA in April 1914. The Zürich branch of the IPA withdrew from membership the following July.

Later the same year, Freud published a paper entitled "The History of the Psychoanalytic Movement", the German original being first published in the Jahrbuch, giving his view on the birth and evolution of the psychoanalytic movement and the withdrawal of Adler and Jung from it.

The final defection from Freud's inner circle occurred following the publication in 1924 of Rank's The Trauma of Birth, which other members of the Committee read as, in effect, abandoning the Oedipus Complex as the central tenet of psychoanalytic theory. Abraham and Jones became increasingly forceful critics of Rank. Though he and Freud were reluctant to end their close and long-standing relationship, the break finally came in 1926 when Rank resigned from his official posts in the IPA and left Vienna for Paris. His place on the committee was taken by Anna Freud. Rank eventually settled in the United States, where his revisions of Freudian theory were to influence a new generation of therapists uncomfortable with the orthodoxies of the IPA.

=== Early psychoanalytic movement ===
After the founding of the IPA in 1910, an international network of psychoanalytical societies, training institutes, and clinics became well established and a regular schedule of biannual Congresses commenced after the end of World War I to coordinate their activities and as a forum for presenting papers on clinical and theoretical topics.

Abraham and Eitingon founded the Berlin Psychoanalytic Society in 1910 and then the Berlin Psychoanalytic Institute and the Poliklinik in 1920. The Poliklinik's innovations in free treatment, the child analysis, and the Berlin Institute's standardisation of psychoanalytic training had a major influence on the wider psychoanalytic movement. In 1927, Ernst Simmel founded the Schloss Tegel Sanatorium on the outskirts of Berlin, the first such establishment to provide psychoanalytic treatment in an institutional framework. Freud organised a fund to help finance its activities, and his architect son, Ernst, was commissioned to refurbish the building. It was forced to close in 1931 for economic reasons.

The 1910 Moscow Psychoanalytic Society became the Russian Psychoanalytic Society and Institute in 1922. Freud's Russian followers were the first to benefit from translations of his work, the 1904 Russian translation of The Interpretation of Dreams appearing nine years before Brill's English edition. The Russian Institute was unique in receiving state support for its activities, including the publication of translations of Freud's works. Support was abruptly annulled in 1924, when Joseph Stalin came to power, after which psychoanalysis was denounced on ideological grounds.

After helping found the American Psychoanalytic Association in 1911, Ernest Jones returned to Britain from Canada in 1913 and founded the London Psychoanalytic Society. In 1919, he dissolved this organisation and, with its core membership purged of Jungian adherents, founded the British Psychoanalytical Society, serving as its president until 1944. The Institute of Psychoanalysis was established in 1924, and the London Clinic of Psychoanalysis was established in 1926, both under Jones's directorship.

The Vienna Ambulatorium (Clinic) was established in 1922, and the Vienna Psychoanalytic Institute was founded in 1924 under the directorship of Helene Deutsch. Ferenczi founded the Budapest Psychoanalytic Institute in 1913 and a clinic in 1929.

Psychoanalytic societies and institutes were established in Switzerland (1919), France (1926), Italy (1932), the Netherlands (1933), Norway (1933), and in Mandatory Palestine (Jerusalem, 1933) by Eitingon, who had fled Berlin after Adolf Hitler came to power. The New York Psychoanalytic Institute was founded in 1931.

The 1922 Berlin Congress was the last Freud attended. By this time, his speech had become seriously impaired by the prosthetic device he needed as a result of a series of operations on his cancerous jaw. He kept abreast of developments through regular correspondence with his principal followers and via the circular letters and meetings of the Secret Committee, which he continued to attend.

The Committee continued to function until 1927, by which time institutional developments within the IPA, such as the establishment of the International Training Commission, had addressed concerns about the transmission of psychoanalytic theory and practice. There remained, however, significant differences over the issue of lay analysis – i.e., the acceptance of non-medically qualified candidates for psychoanalytic training. Freud set out his case in favour in 1926 in his The Question of Lay Analysis. He was resolutely opposed by American societies, which expressed concerns over professional standards and the risk of litigation (though child analysts were made exempt). Some of his European colleagues shared these concerns. Eventually, an agreement was reached allowing societies autonomy in setting criteria for candidature.

In 1930 Freud received the Goethe Prize in recognition of his contributions to psychology and German literary culture. By the mid-1920s Freud had become an internationally recognised figure. In 1925 the Hollywood producer Samuel Goldwyn travelled to Vienna intending to offer him $100,000 to advise on a film about history's great love stories; Freud declined even to meet him, prompting the New York Times headline "Freud Rebuffs Goldwyn". His nephew Edward Bernays, a pioneer of public relations in the United States, drew on psychoanalytic ideas in developing his theory of propaganda and helped popularise his uncle's work there. Freud was repeatedly proposed for the Nobel Prize—nominated on several occasions for the prize in Physiology or Medicine and supported by literary admirers including Thomas Mann and Romain Rolland—but never received it. For Freud's eightieth birthday in 1936, Mann delivered an address, "Freud and the Future" (Freud und die Zukunft), in his honour. In 1932, at the invitation of the League of Nations' International Institute of Intellectual Cooperation, Freud exchanged an open correspondence with Albert Einstein on the causes of war and the prospects for preventing it. Published in 1933 as Why War? (Warum Krieg?), Freud's contribution related human aggressiveness to his theory of the death drive while expressing a guarded hope that the advance of culture might work against war.

=== Patients ===
Freud used pseudonyms in his case histories. Some pseudonyms he used for patients were Cäcilie M. (Anna von Lieben); Dora (Ida Bauer, 1882–1945); Frau Emmy von N. (Fanny Moser); Fräulein Elisabeth von R. (Ilona Weiss); Fräulein Katharina (Aurelia Kronich); Fräulein Lucy R.; Little Hans (Herbert Graf, 1903–1973); Rat Man (Ernst Lanzer); Enos Fingy (Joshua Wild); and Wolf Man (Sergei Pankejeff). Other famous patients included Prince Pedro Augusto of Brazil; H.D.; Emma Eckstein; Gustav Mahler, with whom Freud had only a single, extended consultation; Bruno Walter; Princess Marie Bonaparte; Edith Banfield Jackson; and Albert Hirst.

=== Cancer ===
In 1917, Freud noticed a painful lesion on the roof of his mouth, but because it receded he did not seek medical attention. By February 1923, the growth had spread, which was when Freud identified it as either leukoplakia or epithelioma brought on by his smoking habit. Reluctant to give up smoking, he initially kept his symptoms a secret. Freud later consulted the dermatologist Maximilian Steiner, who advised him to quit smoking but minimized the lesion's implications. Shortly after, Freud met with Felix Deutsch, who was also reluctant to tell Freud that the growth was cancerous. He too described it as an instance of leukoplakia. Both men told Freud to give up smoking, and Deutsch told him to seek surgical treatment. Freud was treated by Marcus Hajek, a rhinologist whose competence he had previously questioned. Hajek performed unnecessary cosmetic surgery in his clinic's outpatient department. Freud bled during and after the operation and may narrowly have escaped death. At a subsequent visit, Deutsch saw that further surgery would be required, but he did not tell Freud that he had cancer because he was worried that Freud might attempt suicide.

=== Escape from the Nazis ===
In January 1933, the Nazi Party took control of Germany, and Freud's books were prominent among those they burned. Freud remarked to Ernest Jones: "What progress we are making. In the Middle Ages they would have burned me. Now, they are content with burning my books." Freud underestimated the growing Nazi threat and remained determined to stay in Vienna, even following the Anschluss of 13 March 1938 and the outbreaks of violent antisemitism that ensued. Jones, who was then the president of the International Psychoanalytical Association (IPA), flew into Vienna on 15 March determined to get Freud to change his mind and seek exile in Britain. This prospect and the shock of the arrest and interrogation of Anna Freud on 22 March by the Gestapo finally convinced Freud it was time to leave. Jones left for London the following week with a list provided by Freud of the party of émigrés for whom immigration permits would be required. Back in London, Jones used his personal acquaintance with the Home Secretary, Sir Samuel Hoare, to expedite the granting of permits. There were seventeen in all, and work permits were provided where relevant. Jones also used his influence in scientific circles, persuading the president of the Royal Society, Sir William Bragg, to write to the Foreign Secretary Lord Halifax, requesting to good effect that diplomatic pressure be applied in Berlin and Vienna on Freud's behalf. Freud also had support from American diplomats, notably his ex-patient and American ambassador to France, William Bullitt. Bullitt alerted U.S. President Roosevelt to the increased dangers facing the Freuds, resulting in the American consul-general in Vienna, John Cooper Wiley, arranging regular monitoring of Berggasse 19. He also intervened by phone during the Gestapo interrogation of Anna Freud.

The departure from Vienna occurred in stages throughout late April and early May 1938. Freud's grandson, Ernst Halberstadt, and Freud's son Martin's wife and children left for Paris in April. Freud's sister-in-law, Minna Bernays, left for London on 5 May, Martin Freud the following week, and Freud's daughter Mathilde and her husband, Robert Hollitscher, on 24 May.

By the end of the month, arrangements for Freud's own departure for London had become stalled, mired in a legally torturous and financially extortionate process of negotiation with the Nazi authorities. Under regulations imposed on the Jewish population by the Nazis, a Kommissar was appointed to manage Freud's assets and those of the IPA. He was Anton Sauerwald, who had studied chemistry at Vienna University under Professor Josef Herzig, an old friend of Freud's. Sauerwald read Freud's books to learn more about him and became sympathetic. Though required to disclose details of all of Freud's bank accounts to his superiors and to arrange the destruction of the historic library of books housed at the IPA, Sauerwald did neither. Instead, he removed evidence of Freud's foreign bank accounts to his own safekeeping and arranged the storage of the IPA library in the Austrian National Library, where it remained until the end of the war.

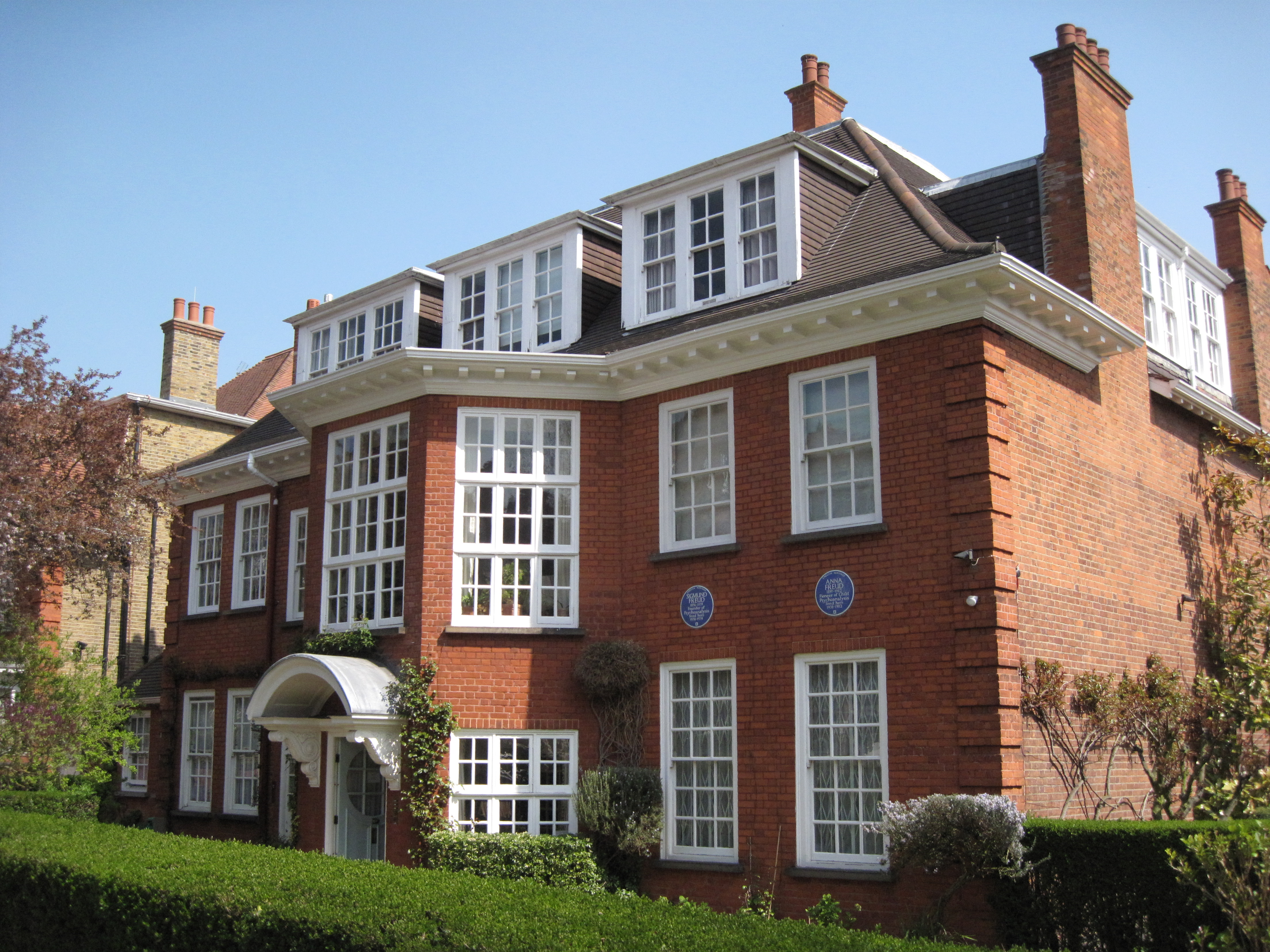
Freud's last home, now the Freud Museum, 20 Maresfield Gardens, Hampstead, north London

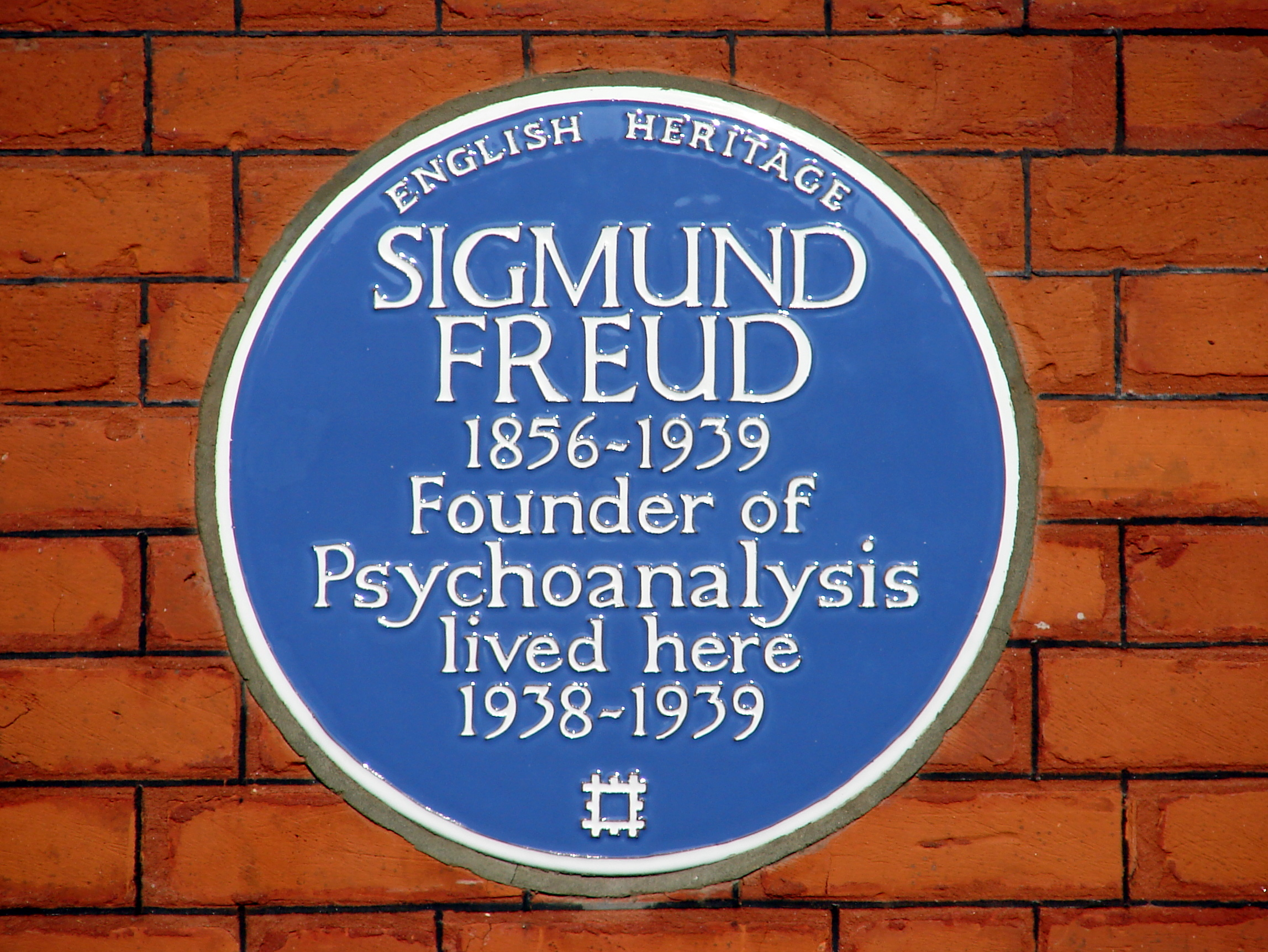
Commemorative English Heritage blue plaque at Freud's Hampstead home

Though Sauerwald's intervention lessened the financial burden of the Reich Flight Tax on Freud's declared assets, other substantial charges were levied concerning the debts of the IPA and the valuable collection of antiquities Freud possessed. Unable to access his own accounts, Freud turned to Princess Marie Bonaparte, the most eminent and wealthy of his French followers, who had travelled to Vienna to offer her support, and it was she who made the necessary funds available. This allowed Sauerwald to sign the necessary exit visas for Freud, his wife Martha, and daughter Anna. They left Vienna on the Orient Express on 4 June, accompanied by their housekeeper and a doctor, arriving in Paris the following day, where they stayed as guests of Marie Bonaparte, before travelling overnight to London, arriving at London Victoria station on 6 June.

Among those soon to call on Freud in London to pay their respects were Salvador Dalí, Stefan Zweig, Leonard and Virginia Woolf, and H. G. Wells. Representatives of the Royal Society called with the Society's Charter for Freud, who had been elected a Foreign Member in 1936, to sign himself into membership. Marie Bonaparte arrived near the end of June to discuss the fate of Freud's four elderly sisters in Vienna. Her subsequent attempts to get them exit visas failed; they all were murdered in Nazi concentration camps.

In early 1939, Sauerwald arrived in London in mysterious circumstances, where he met Freud's brother Alexander. He was tried and imprisoned in 1945 by an Austrian court for his activities as a Nazi Party official. Responding to a plea from his wife, Anna Freud wrote to confirm that Sauerwald "used his office as our appointed commissar in such a manner as to protect my father". Her intervention helped secure his release in 1947.

Freud's new family home was established in Hampstead at 20 Maresfield Gardens in September 1938. Freud's architect son, Ernst, designed modifications of the building, including the installation of an electric lift. The study and library areas were arranged to create the atmosphere and visual impression of Freud's Vienna consulting rooms. He continued to see patients there until the terminal stages of his illness. He also worked on his last books, Moses and Monotheism, published in German in 1938 and in English the following year and the uncompleted An Outline of Psychoanalysis, which was published posthumously.

=== Death ===
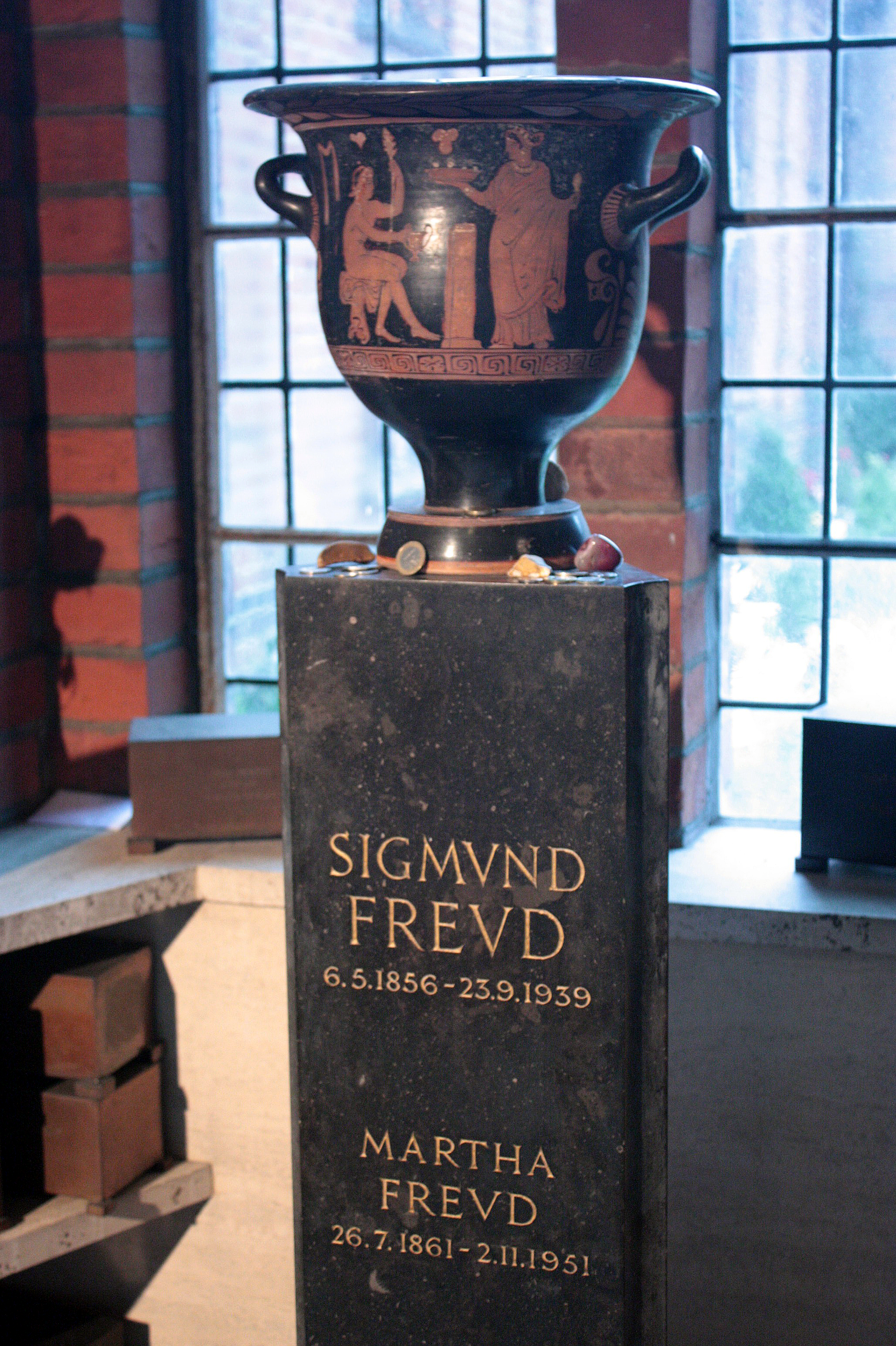
Freud's ashes in the "Freud Corner" at Golders Green Crematorium, London

By mid-September 1939, Freud's cancer of the jaw was causing him increasingly severe pain and had been declared inoperable. The last book he read, Balzac's La Peau de chagrin, prompted reflections on his own increasing frailty. A few days later, he turned to his doctor, friend, and fellow refugee, Max Schur, reminding him that they had previously discussed the terminal stages of his illness: "Schur, you remember our 'contract' not to leave me in the lurch when the time had come. Now it is nothing but torture and makes no sense." When Schur replied that he had not forgotten, Freud said, "I thank you," and then, "Talk it over with Anna, and if she thinks it's right, then make an end of it." Anna Freud wanted to postpone her father's death, but Schur convinced her it was pointless to keep him alive; on 21 and 22 September, he administered doses of morphine that resulted in Freud's death at around 3 a.m. on 23 September 1939. However, discrepancies in the accounts Schur gave of his role in Freud's final hours led to inconsistencies between Freud's main biographers. A revised account proposes that Schur was absent from Freud's deathbed when a third and final dose of morphine was administered by Josephine Stross, a colleague of Anna Freud, leading to Freud's death at around midnight on 23 September 1939.

Three days after his death, Freud's body was cremated at Golders Green Crematorium, with Harrods acting as funeral directors, on the instructions of his son, Ernst. Funeral orations were given by Ernest Jones and the Austrian author Stefan Zweig. Freud's ashes were later placed in a corner of the crematorium's Ernest George Columbarium on a plinth designed by his son, Ernst, in a sealed ancient Greek bell krater painted with Dionysian scenes that Freud had received as a gift from Marie Bonaparte and had kept in his study in Vienna for many years. After his wife, Martha, died in 1951, her ashes were also placed in the urn.

== Ideas ==
=== Early work ===
Sigmund Freud began studying medicine at the University of Vienna in 1873. He took almost nine years to finish due to his interest in neurophysiological research, specifically the investigation of the sexual anatomy of eels and the physiology of the fish nervous system, and because of his interest in studying philosophy with Franz Brentano. He entered private practice in neurology for financial reasons, receiving his doctorate in medicine in 1881 at the age of 25. Amongst his principal concerns in the 1880s was the anatomy of the brain, specifically the medulla oblongata. He intervened in the important debates about aphasia in 1891 with his monograph Zur Auffassung der Aphasien, in which he coined the term agnosia and counselled against a too locationist view of the explanation of neurological deficits. Like his contemporary Eugen Bleuler, he emphasized brain function rather than brain structure.

Freud was also an early researcher in the field of cerebral palsy, which was then known as "cerebral paralysis". He published several medical papers on the topic and showed that the disease existed long before other researchers of the period began to study it. He suggested that William John Little, the man who first identified cerebral palsy, was wrong about the lack of oxygen during birth being a cause. Instead, he suggested that birth complications were a symptom.

The origins of Freud's early work in psychoanalysis can be traced to Josef Breuer. Freud credited Breuer with opening the way to the discovery of the psychoanalytical method through his treatment of Anna O., the first case study in Freud and Breuer's Studies on Hysteria (1895). In November 1880, Breuer was called in to treat a highly intelligent 21-year-old woman (Bertha Pappenheim) for a persistent cough and hallucinations that he diagnosed as hysterical. He found that while nursing her dying father, she had developed some transitory symptoms, including visual disorders and paralysis, and contractures of the limbs, which he also diagnosed as hysterical. Breuer began to see his patient almost every day as the symptoms increased and became more persistent, and observed that she entered states of absence. He found that when, with his encouragement, she told fantasy stories in her evening states of absence, her condition improved, and most of her symptoms had disappeared by April 1881. After the death of her father that month, her condition deteriorated. Breuer recorded that some of the symptoms eventually remitted spontaneously and that full recovery was achieved by inducing her to recall events that had precipitated the occurrence of a specific symptom. In the years immediately following Breuer's treatment, Anna O. spent three short periods in sanatoria with the diagnosis "hysteria" with "somatic symptoms", and some authors have challenged Breuer's published account of a cure. Richard Skues rejects these authors' claims that Anna O. was not cured, which he sees as coming from both Freud's admirers and detractors, both of whom Skues shows "have unfairly maligned the truthfulness and integrity of Josef Breuer".

=== Seduction theory ===
In the early 1890s, Freud used a form of treatment based on the one that Breuer had described to him, modified by what he called his "pressure technique" and his newly developed analytic technique of interpretation and reconstruction. According to Freud's later accounts of this period, as a result of his use of this procedure, most of his patients in the mid-1890s reported early childhood sexual abuse. He used these accounts as the basis for his seduction theory, but then he came to believe that some of them were fantasies. He explained these at first as having the function of "fending off" memories of infantile masturbation. In later years, he wrote that they represented Oedipal fantasies, stemming from innate drives that are sexual and destructive in nature.

Another version of events focuses on Freud's proposing that unconscious memories of infantile sexual abuse were at the root of the psychoneuroses in letters to Fliess in October 1895, before he reported that he had actually discovered such abuse among his patients. In the first half of 1896, Freud published three papers, which led to his seduction theory, stating that he had uncovered, in all of his current patients, deeply repressed memories of sexual abuse in early childhood. In these papers, Freud recorded that his patients were not consciously aware of these memories, and must therefore be present as unconscious memories if they were to result in hysterical symptoms or obsessional neurosis. The patients were subjected to considerable pressure to "reproduce" infantile sexual abuse "scenes" that Freud was convinced had been repressed into the unconscious. Patients were generally unconvinced that their experiences of Freud's clinical procedures indicated actual sexual abuse. He reported that even after a supposed "reproduction" of sexual scenes, the patients assured him emphatically of their disbelief.

As well as his pressure technique, Freud's clinical procedures involved analytic inference and the symbolic interpretation of symptoms to trace back to memories of infantile sexual abuse. His claim of one hundred percent confirmation of his theory only served to reinforce previously expressed reservations from his colleagues about the validity of findings obtained through his suggestive techniques. Freud subsequently showed inconsistency as to whether his seduction theory was still compatible with his later findings. In an addendum to The Aetiology of Hysteria he stated: "It must be remembered that at the time I wrote it I had not yet freed myself from my overvaluation of reality and my low valuation of phantasy". Some years later, Freud explicitly rejected the claim of his colleague Ferenczi that his patients' reports of sexual molestation were actual memories instead of fantasies, and he tried to dissuade Ferenczi from making his views public. Karin Ahbel-Rappe concludes that "Freud marked out and started down a trail of investigation into the nature of the experience of infantile incest and its impact on the human psyche, and then abandoned this direction for the most part."

=== Cocaine ===
As a medical researcher, Freud was an early user and proponent of cocaine as a stimulant as well as analgesic. He believed that cocaine was a cure for many mental and physical problems, and in his 1884 paper "On Coca," he extolled its virtues. Between 1883 and 1887, he wrote several articles recommending medical applications, including its use as an antidepressant. He narrowly missed out on obtaining scientific priority for discovering its anesthetic properties, of which he was aware but had mentioned only in passing. (Karl Koller, a colleague of Freud's in Vienna, received that distinction in 1884 after reporting to a medical society the ways cocaine could be used in delicate eye surgery.) Freud also recommended cocaine as a cure for morphine addiction. He had introduced cocaine to his friend Ernst von Fleischl-Marxow, who had become addicted to morphine taken to relieve years of excruciating nerve pain resulting from an infection acquired after injuring himself while performing an autopsy. His claim that Fleischl-Marxow was cured of his addiction was premature. Fleischl-Marxow developed an acute case of "cocaine psychosis", and soon returned to using morphine, dying a few years later, still suffering from intolerable pain.

The application as an anaesthetic turned out to be one of the few safe uses of cocaine. As reports of addiction and overdose began to filter in from many places in the world, Freud's medical reputation became somewhat tarnished. After the "Cocaine Episode" Freud ceased to recommend the use of the drug publicly, but continued to take it himself occasionally for depression, migraines, and nasal inflammation during the early 1890s, before discontinuing its use in 1896.

=== Unconscious ===
The concept of the unconscious, which Freud regarded as already well known among poets, was important to his theories and ideas; he also believed it was his responsibility to ensure it received scientific recognition in the field of psychology.

Freud states explicitly that his concept of the unconscious, as he first formulated it, was based on the theory of repression. In his formulations of the concept of repression in his 1915 paper "Repression" (Standard Edition XIV), Freud introduces the distinction in the unconscious between primary repression linked to the universal taboo on incest ("innately present originally") and repression ("after expulsion") that was a product of an individual's life history ("acquired in the course of the ego's development") in which something that was at one point conscious is rejected or eliminated from consciousness.

In his account of the development and modification of his theory of unconscious mental processes, he sets out in his 1915 paper "The Unconscious" (Standard Edition XIV), Freud identifies the three perspectives he employs: the dynamic, the economic, and the topographical.

The dynamic perspective concerns firstly the constitution of the unconscious by repression and secondly the process of "censorship", which maintains unwanted, anxiety-inducing thoughts as such. Here, Freud drew on observations from his earliest clinical work in the treatment of hysteria.

From the economic perspective, the focus is on the trajectories of the repressed contents ("the vicissitudes of sexual impulses") as they undergo complex transformations in the process of both symptom formation and normal unconscious thought, such as dreams and slips of the tongue. These were topics Freud explored in detail in The Interpretation of Dreams and The Psychopathology of Everyday Life.

Whereas both these former perspectives focus on the unconscious as it is about to enter consciousness, the topographical perspective represents a shift in which the systemic properties of the unconscious, its characteristic processes, and modes of operation, such as condensation and displacement, are placed in the foreground.

This "first topography" presents a model of psychic structure comprising three systems:

- The System Ucs—the unconscious: "primary process" mentation governed by the pleasure principle characterised by "exemption from mutual contradiction, ... mobility of cathexes, timelessness, and replacement of external by psychical reality." ("The Unconscious" (1915) Standard Edition XIV).
- The System Pcs: the preconscious in which the unconscious thing-presentations of the primary process are bound by the secondary processes of language (word presentations), a prerequisite for their becoming available to consciousness.
- The System Cns—conscious thought governed by the reality principle.

In his later work—notably in The Ego and the Id (1923)—a second topography is introduced comprising id, ego and superego, which is superimposed on the first without replacing it. In this later formulation of the concept of the unconscious, the id comprises a reservoir of instincts or drives—a portion of them being hereditary or innate and another portion repressed or acquired. As such, from the economic perspective, the id is the prime source of psychical energy; from the dynamic perspective, it conflicts with the ego and the superego which, genetically speaking, are diversifications of the id.

=== Dreams ===
In Freud's theory, dreams are inspired by the daily occurrences and thoughts of everyday life. In what Freud called the "dream-work", these "secondary process" thoughts ("word presentations"), governed by the rules of language and the reality principle, become subject to the "primary process" of unconscious thought ("thing presentations"), governed by the pleasure principle, wish gratification, and the repressed sexual scenarios of childhood. Because of the disturbing nature of the latter and other repressed thoughts and desires which may have become linked to them, the dream-work operates a censorship function, disguising by distortion, displacement, and condensation of the repressed thoughts to preserve sleep.

In the clinical setting, Freud encouraged free association to the dream's manifest content, as recounted in the dream narrative, to facilitate interpretative work on its latent content—the repressed thoughts and fantasies—and also on the underlying mechanisms and structures operative in the dream-work. As Freud developed his theoretical work on dreams he went beyond his theory of dreams as wish-fulfillments to arrive at an emphasis on dreams as "nothing other than a particular form of thinking. ... It is the dream-work that creates that form, and it alone is the essence of dreaming".

=== Psychosexual development ===
Freud's theory of psychosexual development proposes that following on from the initial polymorphous perversity of infantile sexuality, the sexual "drives" pass through three distinct developmental phases: the oral stage, the anal stage, and the phallic stage. Although these phases then give way to a latency stage of reduced sexual interest and activity (from the age of five to puberty, approximately), they leave a "perverse" and bisexual residue which persists during the formation of adult genital sexuality. Freud argued that neurosis and perversion could be explained in terms of fixation or regression to these phases, whereas adult character and cultural creativity could achieve a sublimation of their perverse residue.

After Freud's later development of the theory of the Oedipus complex, this normative developmental trajectory becomes formulated in terms of the child's renunciation of incestuous desires under the fantasised threat of (or fantasised fact of, in the case of the girl) castration. The "dissolution" of the Oedipus complex is then achieved when the child's rivalrous identification with the parental figure is transformed into the pacifying identifications of the ego ideal which assume both similarity and difference and acknowledge the separateness and autonomy of the other.

Freud hoped to prove that his model was universally valid and turned to ancient mythology and contemporary ethnography for comparative material, arguing that totemism reflected a ritualized enactment of a tribal Oedipal conflict.

=== Id, ego, and superego ===
The iceberg metaphor is often used to explain the psyche's parts in relation to one another.

Freud proposed that the human psyche could be divided into three parts: the Id, the Ego, and the Superego. Freud discussed this model in the 1920 essay Beyond the Pleasure Principle, and fully elaborated upon it in The Ego and the Id (1923), in which he developed it as an alternative to his previous topographic schema (i.e., conscious, unconscious, and preconscious). The id is the unconscious portion of the psyche that operates on the "pleasure principle" and is the source of basic impulses and drives; it seeks immediate pleasure and gratification. Freud acknowledged that his use of the term Id (das Es, "the It") derives from the writings of Georg Groddeck.

The superego is the moral component of the psyche. The rational ego attempts to exact a balance between the impractical hedonism of the id and the equally impractical moralism of the superego; it is the part of the psyche that is usually reflected most directly in a person's actions. When overburdened or threatened by its tasks, it may employ defence mechanisms including denial, repression, undoing, rationalization, and displacement. This concept is usually represented by the "Iceberg Model". This model represents the roles the id, ego, and superego play in relation to conscious and unconscious thought.

Freud compared the relationship between the ego and the id to that between a charioteer and his horses: the horses provide the energy and drive, while the charioteer provides direction.

=== Life and death drives ===
Freud believed that the human psyche is subject to two conflicting drives: the life drive or libido and the death drive. The life drive was also termed "Eros" and the death drive "Thanatos", although Freud did not use the latter term; "Thanatos" was introduced in this context by Paul Federn. Freud hypothesized that libido is a form of mental energy with which processes, structures, and object-representations are invested.

In Beyond the Pleasure Principle (1920), Freud inferred the existence of a death drive. Its premise was a regulatory principle described as "the principle of psychic inertia", "the Nirvana principle", and "the conservatism of instinct". Its background was Freud's earlier Project for a Scientific Psychology, where he had defined the principle governing the mental apparatus as its tendency to divest itself of quantity or to reduce tension to zero. Freud had been obliged to abandon that definition, since it proved adequate only to the most rudimentary kinds of mental functioning, and replaced the idea that the apparatus tends toward a level of zero tension with the idea that it tends toward a minimum level of tension.

Freud, in effect, readopted the original definition in Beyond the Pleasure Principle, this time applying it to a different principle. He asserted that on certain occasions the mind acts as though it could eliminate tension, or, in effect, to reduce itself to a state of extinction; his key evidence for this was the existence of the compulsion to repeat. Examples of such repetition included the dream life of traumatic neurotics and children's play. In the phenomenon of repetition, Freud saw a psychic tendency to work over earlier impressions, to master them and derive pleasure from them, a tendency that preceded the pleasure principle but was not opposed to it. In addition to that trend, there was also a principle at work that was opposed to, and thus "beyond" the pleasure principle. If repetition is a necessary element in the binding of energy or adaptation, when carried to inordinate lengths, it becomes a means of abandoning adaptations and reinstating earlier or less evolved psychic positions. By combining this idea with the hypothesis that all repetition is a form of discharge, Freud concluded that the compulsion to repeat is an effort to restore a state that is both historically primitive and marked by the total draining of energy: death. Some scholars have described this as "metaphysical biology".

=== Melancholia ===
In his 1917 essay "Mourning and Melancholia", Freud distinguished mourning, painful but an inevitable part of life, and "melancholia", his term for the pathological refusal of a mourner to "decathect" from the lost one. Freud claimed that, in normal mourning, the ego was responsible for narcissistically detaching the libido from the lost one as a means of self-preservation, but that in "melancholia", prior ambivalence towards the lost one prevents this from occurring. Suicide, Freud hypothesized, could result in extreme cases, when unconscious feelings of conflict became directed against the mourner's own ego.

=== Femininity and female sexuality ===
Freud's account of femininity is grounded in his theory of psychic development as it traces the uneven transition from the earliest stages of infantile and childhood sexuality, characterised by polymorphous perversity and a bisexual disposition, through to the fantasy scenarios and rivalrous identifications of the Oedipus complex and on to the greater or lesser extent these are modified in adult sexuality. There are different trajectories for the boy and the girl, which arise as effects of the castration complex. Anatomical difference, the possession of a penis, induces castration anxiety for the boy, whereas the girl experiences a sense of deprivation. In the boy's case, the castration complex concludes the Oedipal phase, whereas in the girl's case, it precipitates it.

The constraint of the erotic feelings and fantasies of the girl and her turning away from the mother to the father is an uneven and precarious process entailing "waves of repression". The normal outcome was, according to Freud, the vagina becoming "the new leading zone" of sexual sensitivity, displacing the previously dominant clitoris, the phallic properties of which made it indistinguishable in the child's early sexual life from the penis. This leaves a legacy of penis envy and emotional ambivalence for the girl, which was "intimately related to the essence of femininity" and leads to "the greater proneness of women to neurosis and especially hysteria." In his last paper on the topic, Freud likewise concludes that "the development of femininity remains exposed to disturbance by the residual phenomena of the early masculine period... Some portion of what we men call the 'enigma of women' may perhaps be derived from this expression of bisexuality in women's lives."

Initiating what became the first debate within psychoanalysis on femininity, Karen Horney of the Berlin Psychoanalytic Institute set out to challenge Freud's account of femininity. Rejecting Freud's theories of the feminine castration complex and penis envy, Horney argued for a primary femininity and penis envy as a defensive formation rather than arising from the fact, or "injury", of biological asymmetry as Freud held. Horney had the influential support of Melanie Klein and Ernest Jones, who coined the term "phallocentrism" in his critique of Freud's position.

In defending Freud against this critique, feminist scholar Jacqueline Rose has argued that it presupposes a more normative account of female sexual development than Freud's. She finds that Freud moved from a description of the little girl stuck with her 'inferiority' or 'injury' in the face of the anatomy of the little boy to an account in his later work which explicitly describes the process of becoming 'feminine' as an 'injury' or 'catastrophe' for the complexity of her earlier psychic and sexual life.

Throughout his deliberations on what he described as the "dark continent" of female sexuality and the "riddle" of femininity, Freud was careful to emphasise the "average validity" and provisional nature of his findings. He did, however, in response to his critics, maintain a steadfast objection "to all of you ... to the extent that you do not distinguish more clearly between what is psychic and what is biological..."

=== Religion ===
Freud regarded the monotheistic God as an illusion based upon the infantile emotional need for a powerful, supernatural pater familias. He maintained that religion, once necessary to restrain man's violent nature in the early stages of civilization, in modern times can be set aside in favor of reason and science. "Obsessive Actions and Religious Practices" (1907) notes the likeness between faith (religious belief) and neurotic obsession. Totem and Taboo (1913) proposes that society and religion begin with the patricide and eating of the powerful paternal figure, who then becomes a revered collective memory. In The Future of an Illusion (1927) Freud argues that the function of religious belief is psychological consolation. He argues that the belief in a supernatural protector serves as a buffer against man's "fear of nature", just as the belief in an afterlife serves as a buffer against man's fear of death. The core idea of the work is that religious belief can be explained by its function in society, rather than by its relation to the truth. In Civilization and Its Discontents (1930), he considers the "oceanic feeling" of wholeness, limitlessness, and eternity (brought to his attention by his friend Romain Rolland), as a possible source for religious feelings. He notes that he has no experience of this feeling himself and suggests that it is a regression to a state of consciousness that precedes the ego's differentiation from the world of objects and others. Moses and Monotheism (1937) proposes that Moses was the tribal pater familias, killed by the Jews, who psychologically coped with the patricide with a reaction formation conducive to their establishing monotheistic Judaism; analogously, he described the Roman Catholic rite of Holy Communion as cultural evidence of the killing and devouring of the sacred father.

Moreover, he perceived religion, with its suppression of violence, as a mediator of the societal and personal, the public and the private, conflicts between Eros and Thanatos, the forces of life and death. Later works indicate Freud's pessimism about the future of civilization, which he noted in the 1931 edition of Civilization and its Discontents. Humphrey Skelton described Freud's worldview as one of "stoical humanism". The Humanist Heritage project summed his contributions to understanding of religion by saying:

Freud's ideas on the origins of the religious impulse, and the comforting illusion religion provided, were a significant contribution to a tradition of scientific humanist thought, in which research and reason were the means of uncovering truth. They also served to highlight the powerful resonance of childhood influences on adult lives, not least in the realm of religion.

In a footnote in his 1909 case study of "Little Hans" (Analysis of a Phobia in a Five-year-old Boy), Freud theorized that the universal fear of castration was provoked in the uncircumcised when they perceived circumcision, and that this was "the deepest unconscious root of antisemitism". Freud, who had been circumcised as a child, was continually critical of circumcision and likely did not have his children circumcised.

=== Occultism ===
Like other scientists of his era, Freud maintained a complex relationship with the occult, driven by a strict rationalist outlook yet a persistent, documented interest in phenomena like parapsychology, mediumship, and thought broadcasting, which he approached despite an initial extreme skepticism.

This topic was one of the causes of his break with Jung, whose theory of precognition he contested in 1909, considering it pure absurdity. After that, however, Freud approached the paranormal to better understand the dynamics of the unconscious, not for mystical or spiritual reasons, but because he considered it worthy of scientific attention, to the point of becoming a member of the British Society for Psychical Research in 1911. He went so far as to state:

I am not one of those who dismiss a priori the study of so-called occult psychic phenomena as unscientific, discreditable or even as dangerous. If I were at the beginning rather than at the end of a scientific career, as I am today, I might possibly choose just this field of research, in spite of all difficulties.

— Sigmund Freud, from a letter to Hereward Carrington dated July 24, 1921

An episode in 1919 involving one of his patients had particularly convinced him of the existence of telepathy, which he believed could manifest itself in the phenomena of transference — that is, when the strong emotional bond between patient and analyst could amplify their unconscious sensitivity, allowing one person to grasp the unexpressed thoughts of the other. This form of telepathy, in any case, was not a magical or supernatural event for him, but was considered the residue of an archaic method of communication between human beings, subsequently replaced by verbal language, and perhaps remaining in the intimate bond between mother and infant.

He discussed it in works such as Dreams and Telepathy (1922) and Dreams and Occultism (1932). However, these works, as well as Psychoanalysis and Telepathy (1921), which was not published until twenty years later, were little publicized, as his colleagues, notably his close collaborator and future biographer Ernest Jones, pressured Freud to keep these interests hidden. Psychoanalysis was a young science, already harshly attacked by official medicine for its theories on sexuality, and Jones and others feared that, if psychoanalysis exposed itself as believing in telepathy, the scientific community would submerge it in the "black tide" of occultism, destroying its credibility.

In Freud: The Making of an Illusion, Frederick Crews writes of Freud's "gradually emergent affinity for the paranormal" and states that Freud came to believe "that the psychoanalytic interview itself was a process of paranormal thought transference...."

== Legacy ==
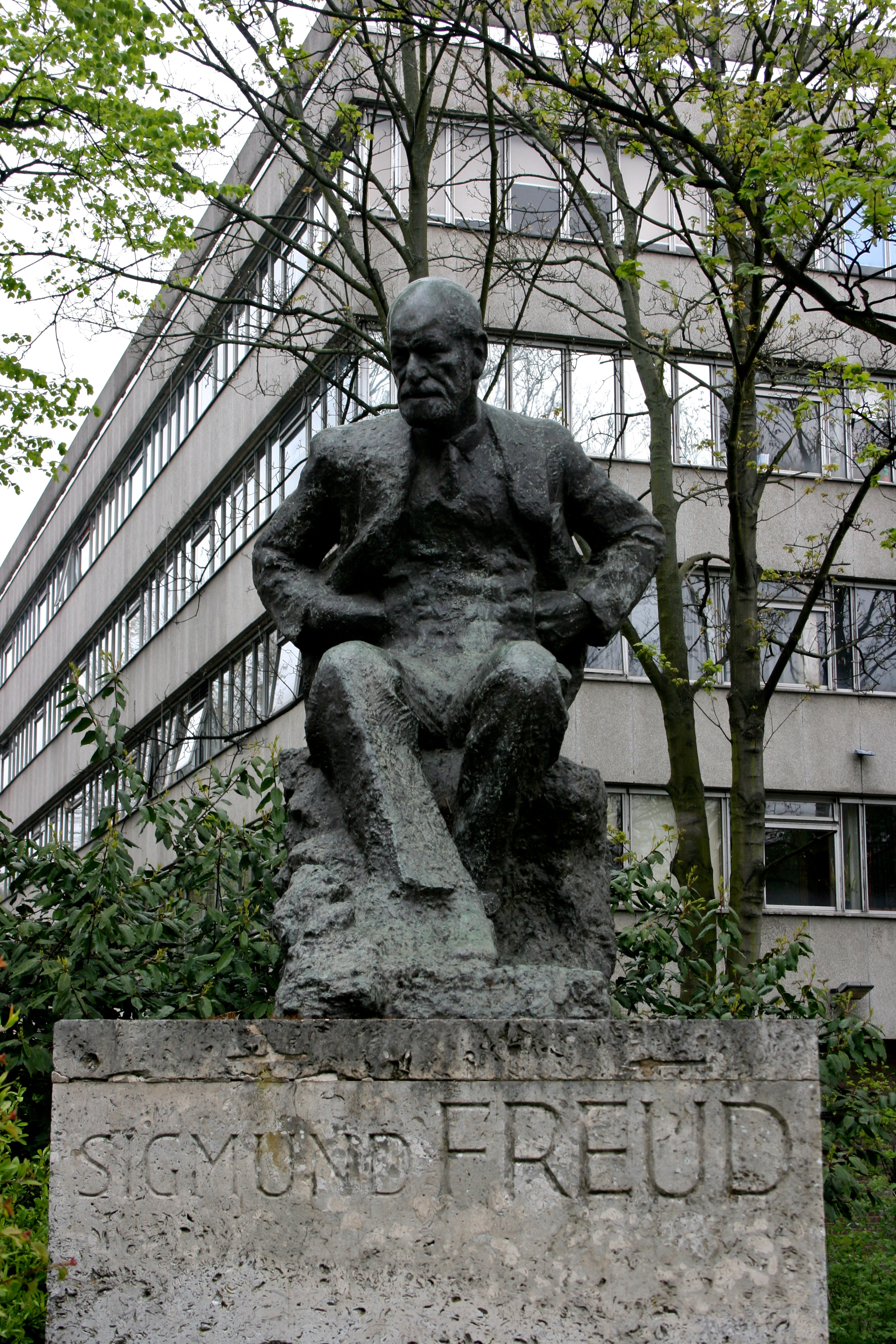
The 1971 Sigmund Freud memorial in Hampstead, North London, by Oscar Nemon, is located near to where Sigmund and Anna Freud lived, now the Freud Museum. The building behind the statue is the Tavistock Clinic, a major psychological health care institution.

Freud's legacy, though controversial, has been assessed as "one of the strongest influences on twentieth-century thought, its impact comparable only to that of Darwinism and Marxism", with its range of influence permeating "all the fields of culture ... so far as to change our way of life and concept of man".

=== Psychotherapy ===
Freud's practice of helping patients through a "talking cure", as an early psychoanalytic patient described it, provided the basic format for all forms of later psychotherapy. While the wide variety of later psychotherapies have adopted different theories and techniques, all have followed Freud by attempting to achieve psychic and behavioral change through having patients talk about their difficulties. Psychoanalysis is not as influential as it once was in Europe and the United States, though in some parts of the world, notably Latin America, its influence in the later 20th century expanded substantially. Psychoanalysis also remains influential within many contemporary schools of psychotherapy and has led to innovative therapeutic work in schools and with families and groups. There is a substantial body of research that demonstrates the efficacy of the clinical methods of psychoanalysis and of related psychodynamic therapies in treating a wide range of psychological disorders.

The neo-Freudians, a group including Alfred Adler, Otto Rank, Karen Horney, Harry Stack Sullivan and Erich Fromm, rejected Freud's theory of instinctual drive, emphasized interpersonal relations and self-assertiveness, and made modifications to therapeutic practice that reflected these theoretical shifts. Neo-Freudian analysis places more emphasis on the patient's relationship with the analyst and less on the exploration of the unconscious.

Jacques Lacan approached psychoanalysis through linguistics and literature. Lacan believed that most of Freud's essential work had been done before 1905, and that ego psychology and object relations theory were based upon misreadings of Freud's work. Lacan saw desire as more important than need.

Wilhelm Reich developed some of Freud's ideas, such as actual neurosis. Freud applied that idea both to infants and to adults. In the former case, seductions were seen as the cause of later neuroses, and in the latter, it was incomplete sexual release. Unlike Freud, Reich retained the idea that actual experience, especially sexual experience, was of key significance. By the 1920s, Reich had "taken Freud's original ideas about sexual release to the point of specifying the orgasm as the criteria of healthy function". Reich was also "developing his ideas about character into a form that would later take shape, first as 'muscular armour', and eventually as a transducer of universal biological energy, the 'orgone'".

Fritz Perls, who helped to develop Gestalt therapy, was influenced by Reich, Jung, and Freud. The key idea of Gestalt therapy is that Freud overlooked the structure of awareness, "an active process that moves toward the construction of organized meaningful wholes ... between an organism and its environment". These wholes, called gestalts, are "patterns involving all the layers of organismic function – thought, feeling, and activity", to which improper formation, in Perls' view, gives rise to neurosis and anxieties. Gestalt therapy attempts to cure patients by placing them in contact with "immediate organismic needs". Perls rejected the verbal approach of classical psychoanalysis; favoring a workshop-style approach.

Arthur Janov's primal therapy, which has been influential in post-Freudian psychotherapy, shares psychoanalytic therapy's emphasis on the early childhood experience but differs from it significantly. While Janov's theory is akin to Freud's early idea of Actualneurosis, he does not have a dynamic psychology but a nature psychology like that of Reich or Perls, in which need is primary while wish is derivative and dispensable when need is met. Despite its superficial similarity to Freud's ideas, Janov's theory lacks a strictly psychological account of the unconscious and belief in infantile sexuality. While for Freud there was a hierarchy of dangerous situations, for Janov, the key event in the child's life is an awareness that the parents do not love it. Janov writes in The Primal Scream (1970) that primal therapy has in some ways returned to Freud's early ideas and techniques.

Ellen Bass and Laura Davis, co-authors of The Courage to Heal (1988), are described as "champions of survivorship" by Frederick Crews, who considers Freud the key influence upon them, although in his view they are indebted not to classic psychoanalysis but to "the pre-psychoanalytic Freud ... who supposedly took pity on his hysterical patients, found that they were all harboring memories of early abuse ... and cured them by unknotting their repression". Crews sees Freud as having anticipated the recovered memory movement by emphasizing "mechanical cause-and-effect relations between symptomatology and the premature stimulation of one body zone or another", and with pioneering its "technique of thematically matching a patient's symptom with a sexually symmetrical 'memory'". Crews believes that Freud's initial confidence in accurate recall of early memories anticipated the theories of recovered memory therapists such as Lenore Terr, which in his view have led to people being wrongfully imprisoned.

=== Science ===
Research projects designed to test Freud's theories empirically have led to a vast literature on the topic. American psychologists began to attempt to study repression in the experimental laboratory around 1930. In 1934, when the psychologist Saul Rosenzweig sent Freud reprints of his attempts to study repression, Freud responded with a dismissive letter stating that "the wealth of reliable observations" on which psychoanalytic assertions were based made them "independent of experimental verification". Seymour Fisher and Roger P. Greenberg concluded in 1977 that some of Freud's concepts were supported by empirical evidence. Their analysis of research literature supported Freud's concepts of oral and anal personality constellations, his account of the role of Oedipal factors in certain aspects of male personality functioning, his formulations about the relatively greater concern about the loss of love in women's as compared to men's personality economy, and his views about the instigating effects of homosexual anxieties on the formation of paranoid delusions. They also found limited and equivocal support for Freud's theories about the development of homosexuality. They found that several of Freud's other theories, including his portrayal of dreams as primarily containers of secret, unconscious wishes, as well as some of his views about the psychodynamics of women, were either not supported or contradicted by research. Reviewing the issues again in 1996, they concluded that much experimental data relevant to Freud's work exists, and supports some of his major ideas and theories.

Other viewpoints include those of psychologist and science historian Malcolm Macmillan, who concludes in Freud Evaluated (1991) that "Freud's method is not capable of yielding objective data about mental processes". Morris Eagle states that it has been "demonstrated quite conclusively that because of the epistemologically contaminated status of clinical data derived from the clinical situation, such data have questionable probative value in the testing of psychoanalytic hypotheses". Richard Webster, in Why Freud Was Wrong (1995), described psychoanalysis as "perhaps the most complex and successful" pseudoscience in history. Crews believes that psychoanalysis has no scientific or therapeutic merit. University of Chicago research associate Kurt Jacobsen takes these critics to task for their own supposedly dogmatic and historically naive views both about psychoanalysis and the nature of science.

I. Bernard Cohen regards Freud's Interpretation of Dreams as a revolutionary work of science, the last such work to be published in book form. In contrast, Allan Hobson believes that Freud, by rhetorically discrediting 19th century investigators of dreams such as Alfred Maury and the Marquis de Hervey de Saint-Denis at a time when study of the physiology of the brain was only beginning, interrupted the development of scientific dream theory for half a century. The dream researcher G. William Domhoff has disputed claims of Freudian dream theory being validated.

Karl Popper claimed that Freud's psychoanalytic theories were unfalsifiable, meaning that no experiment could disprove them. The philosopher Adolf Grünbaum argued in The Foundations of Psychoanalysis (1984) that Popper was mistaken and that many of Freud's theories are empirically testable, a position with which others such as Eysenck agree. The philosopher Roger Scruton, writing in Sexual Desire (1986), also rejected Popper's arguments, pointing to the theory of repression as an example of a Freudian theory that has testable consequences. Scruton nevertheless concluded that psychoanalysis is not genuinely scientific, because it involves an unacceptable dependence on metaphor. The philosopher Donald Levy agrees with Grünbaum that Freud's theories are falsifiable but disputes Grünbaum's contention that therapeutic success is the only empirical basis on which they stand or fall, arguing that a much wider range of empirical evidence can be adduced via clinical case material.

In a study of psychoanalysis in the United States, Nathan Hale reported on the "decline of psychoanalysis in psychiatry" from 1965 to 1985. The continuation of this trend was noted by Alan Stone: "As academic psychology becomes more 'scientific' and psychiatry more biological, psychoanalysis is being brushed aside." Paul Stepansky, while noting that psychoanalysis remains influential in the humanities, records the "vanishingly small number of psychiatric residents who choose to pursue psychoanalytic training" and the "nonanalytic backgrounds of psychiatric chairpersons at major universities" as evidence for his conclusion that "Such historical trends attest to the marginalisation of psychoanalysis within American psychiatry." Nonetheless, Freud was ranked as the third most cited psychologist of the 20th century. It is also claimed that in moving beyond the "orthodoxy of the not so distant past ... new ideas and new research has led to an intense reawakening of interest in psychoanalysis from neighbouring disciplines ranging from the humanities to neuroscience and including the non-analytic therapies".

Research in the emerging field of neuropsychoanalysis, founded by neuroscientist and psychoanalyst Mark Solms, has proved controversial with some psychoanalysts criticising the very concept itself. Solms and his colleagues have argued for neuro-scientific findings being "broadly consistent" with Freudian theories, pointing out brain structures relating to Freudian concepts such as libido, drives, the unconscious, and repression. Neuroscientists who have endorsed Freud's work include David Eagleman who believes that Freud "transformed psychiatry" by providing "the first exploration of the way in which hidden states of the brain participate in driving thought and behavior" and Nobel laureate Eric Kandel who argues that "psychoanalysis still represents the most coherent and intellectually satisfying view of the mind."

=== Philosophy ===
Psychoanalysis has been interpreted as both radical and conservative. By the 1940s, it had come to be seen as conservative by the European and American intellectual community. Critics outside the psychoanalytic movement, whether on the political left or right, saw Freud as a conservative. Fromm had argued that several aspects of psychoanalytic theory served the interests of political reaction in his The Fear of Freedom (1942), an assessment confirmed by sympathetic writers on the right. In Freud: The Mind of the Moralist (1959), Philip Rieff portrayed Freud as a man who urged men to make the best of an inevitably unhappy fate, and was admirable for that reason. In the 1950s, Herbert Marcuse challenged the then prevailing interpretation of Freud as a conservative in Eros and Civilization (1955), as did Lionel Trilling in Freud and the Crisis of Our Culture and Norman O. Brown in Life Against Death (1959). Eros and Civilization helped make the idea that Freud and Karl Marx were addressing similar questions from different perspectives credible to the left. Marcuse criticized neo-Freudian revisionism for discarding seemingly pessimistic theories such as the death instinct, arguing that they could be turned in a utopian direction. Freud's theories also influenced the Frankfurt School and critical theory as a whole.

Freud has been compared to Marx by Reich, who saw Freud's importance for psychiatry as parallel to that of Marx for economics, and by Paul Robinson, who sees Freud as a revolutionary whose contributions to twentieth-century thought are comparable in importance to Marx's contributions to the nineteenth-century thought. Fromm calls Freud, Marx, and Einstein the "architects of the modern age", but rejects the idea that Marx and Freud were equally significant, arguing that Marx was both far more historically important and a finer thinker. Fromm nevertheless credits Freud with permanently changing the way human nature is understood. Gilles Deleuze and Félix Guattari write in Anti-Oedipus (1972) that psychoanalysis resembles the Russian Revolution in that it became corrupted almost from the beginning. They believe this began with Freud's development of the theory of the Oedipus complex, which they see as idealistic.

Jean-Paul Sartre critiques Freud's theory of the unconscious in Being and Nothingness (1943), claiming that consciousness is essentially self-conscious. Maurice Merleau-Ponty considers Freud to be one of the anticipators of phenomenology, while Theodor W. Adorno considers Edmund Husserl, the founder of phenomenology, to be Freud's philosophical opposite, writing that Husserl's polemic against psychologism could have been directed against psychoanalysis. Paul Ricœur sees Freud as one of the three "masters of suspicion", alongside Marx and Nietzsche, for their unmasking 'the lies and illusions of consciousness'. Ricœur and Jürgen Habermas have helped create a "hermeneutic version of Freud", one which "claimed him as the most significant progenitor of the shift from an objectifying, empiricist understanding of the human realm to one stressing subjectivity and interpretation." Louis Althusser drew on Freud's concept of overdetermination for his reinterpretation of Marx's Capital. Jean-François Lyotard developed a theory of the unconscious that reverses Freud's account of dream-work.

Several scholars see Freud as parallel to Plato, writing that they hold nearly the same theory of dreams and have similar theories of the tripartite structure of the human soul or personality, even if the hierarchy between the parts of the soul is almost reversed. Ernest Gellner argues that Freud's theories are an inversion of Plato's. Whereas Plato saw a hierarchy inherent in the nature of reality and relied upon it to validate norms, Freud was a naturalist who could not follow such an approach. Both men's theories drew a parallel between the structure of the human mind and that of society. While Plato wanted to strengthen the superego, which Gellner compared to the aristocracy, Freud wanted to strengthen the ego, which corresponded to the middle class. Paul Vitz compares Freudian psychoanalysis to Thomism, noting St. Thomas's belief in the existence of an "unconscious consciousness" and his "frequent use of the word and concept 'libido' – sometimes in a more specific sense than Freud, but always in a manner in agreement with the Freudian use." Vitz suggests that Freud may have been unaware that his theory of the unconscious was reminiscent of Aquinas.

=== Literature and literary criticism ===
The poem "In Memory of Sigmund Freud" was published by W. H. Auden in his 1940 collection Another Time. Auden describes Freud as having created "a whole climate of opinion / under whom we conduct our different lives."

Freud influenced literary critic Harold Bloom. Camille Paglia has also been influenced by Freud, whom she calls "Nietzsche's heir" and one of the greatest sexual psychologists in literature, but has rejected the scientific status of his work in her Sexual Personae (1990), writing, "Freud has no rivals among his successors because they think he wrote science, when in fact he wrote art."

=== Feminism ===
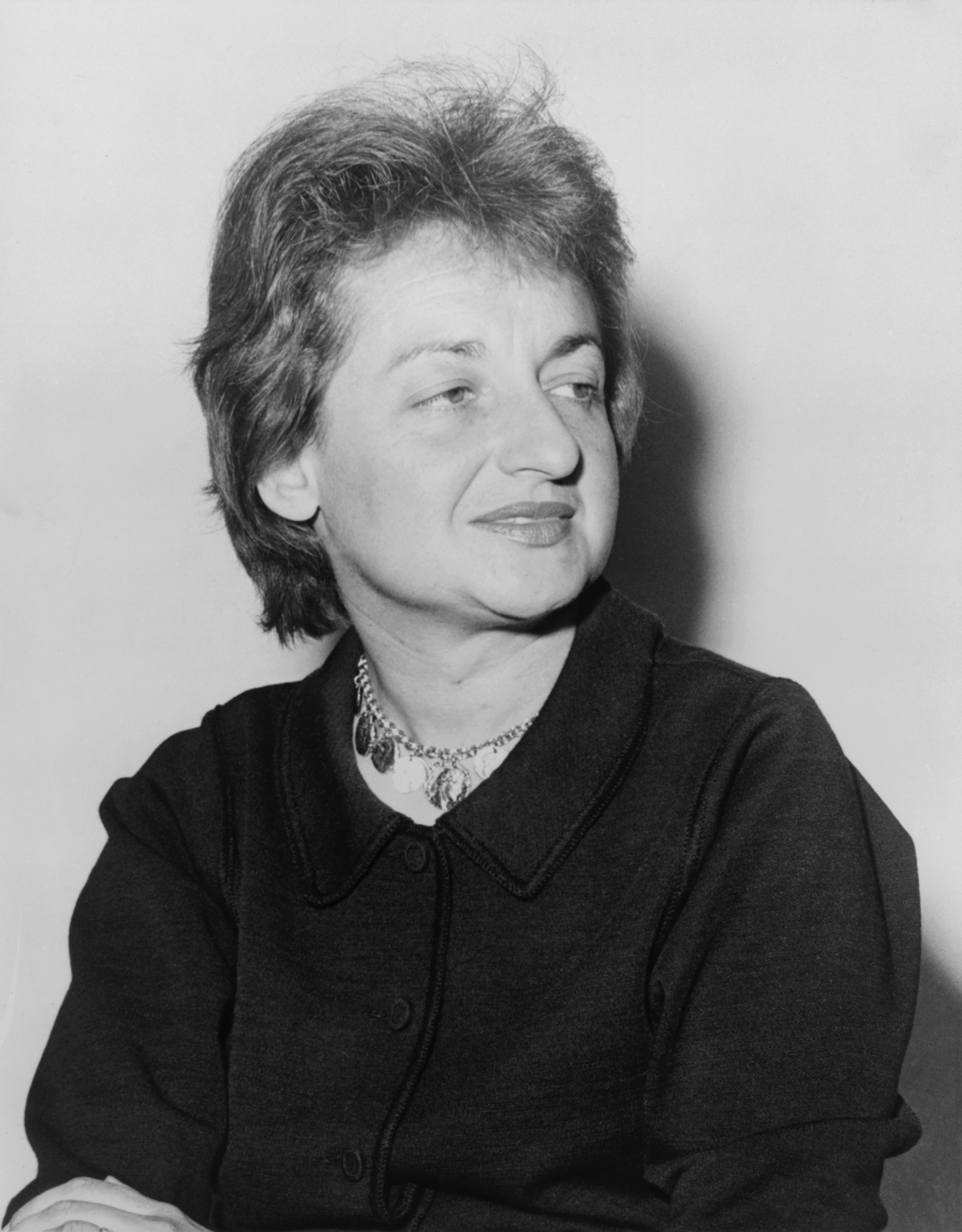
Betty Friedan criticizes Freud's view of women in her 1963 book The Feminine Mystique.

The decline in Freud's reputation has been attributed partly to the revival of feminism. Simone de Beauvoir criticizes psychoanalysis from an existentialist standpoint in The Second Sex (1949), arguing that Freud saw an "original superiority" in the male that is in reality socially induced. Betty Friedan criticizes Freud and what she considered his Victorian view of women in The Feminine Mystique (1963). Freud's concept of penis envy was attacked by Kate Millett, who in Sexual Politics (1970) accused him of confusion and oversights. In 1968, Anne Koedt wrote in her essay The Myth of the Vaginal Orgasm:

It was Freud's feelings about women's secondary and inferior relationship to men that formed the basis for his theories on female sexuality. Once having laid down the law about the nature of our sexuality, Freud not so strangely discovered a tremendous problem of frigidity in women. His recommended cure for a frigid woman was psychiatric care. She was suffering from failure to mentally adjust to her 'natural' role as a woman.

Naomi Weisstein writes that Freud and his followers erroneously thought his "years of intensive clinical experience" added up to scientific rigor.

Freud is also criticized by Shulamith Firestone and Eva Figes. In The Dialectic of Sex (1970), Firestone argues that Freud was a "poet" who produced metaphors rather than literal truths; in her view, Freud, like feminists, recognized that sexuality was the crucial problem of modern life, but ignored the social context. Firestone interprets Freud's "metaphors" in terms of the facts of power within the family. Figes tries in Patriarchal Attitudes (1970) to place Freud within a "history of ideas". Juliet Mitchell defends Freud against his feminist critics in Psychoanalysis and Feminism (1974), accusing them of misreading him and misunderstanding the implications of psychoanalytic theory for feminism. Mitchell helped introduce English-speaking feminists to Lacan. Mitchell is criticized by Jane Gallop in The Daughter's Seduction (1982). Gallop compliments Mitchell for her criticism of feminist discussions of Freud but finds her treatment of Lacanian theory lacking. Some French feminists, among them Julia Kristeva and Luce Irigaray, have been influenced by Freud as interpreted by Lacan.

Psychologist Carol Gilligan writes that "The penchant of developmental theorists to project a masculine image, and one that appears frightening to women, goes back at least to Freud." She sees Freud's criticism of women's sense of justice reappearing in the work of Jean Piaget and Lawrence Kohlberg. Gilligan notes that Nancy Chodorow, in contrast to Freud, attributes sexual difference not to anatomy but to the fact that male and female children have different early social environments. Chodorow, writing against the masculine bias of psychoanalysis, "replaces Freud's negative and derivative description of female psychology with a positive and direct account of her own."

In her analysis of Freud's work on religion in relation to gender, Judith Van Herik noted that Freud paired femininity and the concept of weakness with Christianity and wish fulfillment while associating masculinity and renunciation with Judaism.

Toril Moi has developed a feminist perspective on psychoanalysis proposing that it is a discourse that "attempts to understand the psychic consequences of three universal traumas: the fact that there are others, the fact of sexual difference, and the fact of death". She replaces Freud's term of castration with Stanley Cavell's concept of "victimization" which is a more universal term that applies equally to both sexes. Moi regards this concept of human finitude as a suitable replacement for both castration and sexual difference as the traumatic "discovery of our separate, sexed, mortal existence" and how both men and women come to terms with it.

== Works ==
=== Books ===
- 1891 On Aphasia
- 1895 Studies on Hysteria (co-authored with Josef Breuer)
- 1899 The Interpretation of Dreams
- 1901 On Dreams (abridged version of The Interpretation of Dreams)
- 1904 The Psychopathology of Everyday Life
- 1905 Jokes and Their Relation to the Unconscious
- 1905 Three Essays on the Theory of Sexuality
- 1907 Delusion and Dream in Jensen's Gradiva
- 1910 Five Lectures on Psycho-Analysis
- 1910 Leonardo da Vinci, A Memory of His Childhood
- 1913 Totem and Taboo: Resemblances between the Psychic Lives of Savages and Neurotics
- 1915–17 Introductory Lectures on Psycho-Analysis
- 1920 Beyond the Pleasure Principle
- 1921 Group Psychology and the Analysis of the Ego
- 1923 The Ego and the Id
- 1926 Inhibitions, Symptoms and Anxiety
- 1926 The Question of Lay Analysis
- 1927 The Future of an Illusion
- 1930 Civilization and Its Discontents
- 1933 New Introductory Lectures on Psycho-Analysis
- 1939 Moses and Monotheism
- 1940 An Outline of Psychoanalysis
- 1967 Thomas Woodrow Wilson: A Psychological Study, with William C. Bullitt

=== Case histories ===
- 1905 Fragment of an Analysis of a Case of Hysteria (the Dora case history)
- 1909 Analysis of a Phobia in a Five-Year-Old Boy (the Little Hans case history)
- 1909 Notes upon a Case of Obsessional Neurosis (the Rat Man case history)
- 1911 Psycho-Analytic Notes on an Autobiographical Account of a Case of Paranoia (the Schreber case)
- 1918 From the History of an Infantile Neurosis (the Wolfman case history)
- 1920 The Psychogenesis of a Case of Homosexuality in a Woman
- 1923 A Seventeenth-Century Demonological Neurosis (the Haizmann case)

=== Encyclopedia article ===
- Freud, Sigmund (1926). "Psychoanalysis: Freudian School". In Garvin, James Louis (ed.). Encyclopædia Britannica. Vol. 3 (13th ed.). London & New York: The Encyclopædia Britannica Company. pp. xxiii, 253–255.

=== Papers on sexuality ===
- 1906 My Views on the Part Played by Sexuality in the Aetiology of the Neuroses
- 1908 "Civilized" Sexual Morality and Modern Nervous Illness
- 1910 A Special Type of Choice of Object made by Men
- 1912 Types of Onset of Neurosis
- 1912 The Most Prevalent Form of Degradation in Erotic Life
- 1913 The Disposition to Obsessional Neurosis
- 1915 A Case of Paranoia Running Counter to the Psycho-Analytic Theory of the Disease
- 1919 A Child is Being Beaten: A Contribution to the Origin of Sexual Perversions
- 1922 Medusa's Head
- 1922 Some Neurotic Mechanisms in Jealousy, Paranoia and Homosexuality
- 1923 Infantile Genital Organisation
- 1924 The Dissolution of the Oedipus Complex
- 1925 Some Psychical Consequences of the Anatomical Distinction between the Sexes
- 1927 Fetishism
- 1931 Female Sexuality
- 1933 Femininity
- 1938 The Splitting of the Ego in the Process of Defence

=== Autobiographical papers ===
- 1899 An Autobiographical Note
- 1914 On the History of the Psychoanalytic Movement
- 1925 An Autobiographical Study (1935 Revised edition with Postscript).

=== The Standard Edition ===
The Standard Edition of the Complete Psychological Works of Sigmund Freud. Translated from the German under the general editorship of James Strachey, in collaboration with Anna Freud, assisted by Alix Strachey, Alan Tyson, and Angela Richards. 24 volumes, London: Hogarth Press and the Institute of Psycho-Analysis, 1953–1974.

- Vol. I Pre-Psycho-Analytic Publications and Unpublished Drafts (1886–1899).
- Vol. II Studies in Hysteria (1893–1895). By Josef Breuer and S. Freud.
- Vol. III Early Psycho-Analytic Publications (1893–1899)
- Vol. IV The Interpretation of Dreams (I) (1900)
- Vol. V The Interpretation of Dreams (II) and On Dreams (1900–1901)
- Vol. VI The Psychopathology of Everyday Life (1901)
- Vol. VII A Case of Hysteria, Three Essays on Sexuality and Other Works (1901–1905)
- Vol. VIII Jokes and their Relation to the Unconscious (1905)
- Vol. IX Jensen's 'Gradiva,' and Other Works (1906–1909)
- Vol. X The Cases of 'Little Hans' and the Rat Man' (1909)
- Vol. XI Five Lectures on Psycho-Analysis, Leonardo and Other Works (1910)
- Vol. XII The Case of Schreber, Papers on Technique and Other Works (1911–1913)
- Vol. XIII Totem and Taboo and Other Works (1913–1914)
- Vol. XIV On the History of the Psycho-Analytic Movement, Papers on Meta-psychology and Other Works (1914–1916)
- Vol. XV Introductory Lectures on Psycho-Analysis (Parts I and II) (1915–1916)
- Vol. XVI Introductory Lectures on Psycho-Analysis (Part III) (1916–1917)
- Vol. XVII An Infantile Neurosis and Other Works (1917–1919)
- Vol. XVIII Beyond the Pleasure Principle, Group Psychology and Other Works (1920–1922)
- Vol. XIX The Ego and the Id and Other Works (1923–1925)
- Vol. XX An Autobiographical Study, Inhibitions, Symptoms and Anxiety, Lay Analysis and Other Works (1925–1926)
- Vol. XXI The Future of an Illusion, Civilization and its Discontents and Other Works (1927–1931)
- Vol. XXII New Introductory Lectures on Psycho-Analysis and Other Works (1932–1936)
- Vol. XXIII Moses and Monotheism, An Outline of Psycho-Analysis and Other Works (1937–1939)
- Vol. XXIV Indexes and Bibliographies (Compiled by Angela Richards,1974)

=== The Revised Standard Edition of the Complete Psychological Works of Sigmund Freud ===
A revised and newly annotated edition of the Standard Edition texts was published in 2024 under the editorship of Mark Solms.

== Correspondence ==
- Selected Letters of Sigmund Freud to Martha Bernays, Ansh Mehta and Ankit Patel (eds.), CreateSpace Independent Publishing Platform, 2015. ISBN 978-1-5151-3703-0
- Correspondence: Sigmund Freud, Anna Freud, Cambridge: Polity 2014. ISBN 978-0-7456-4149-2
- The Letters of Sigmund Freud and Otto Rank: Inside Psychoanalysis (eds. E.J. Lieberman and Robert Kramer). Johns Hopkins University Press, 2012.
- The Complete Letters of Sigmund Freud to Wilhelm Fliess, 1887–1904, (editor and translator Jeffrey Moussaieff Masson), 1985, ISBN 978-0-674-15420-9
- The Freud-Jung Letters: The Correspondence Between Sigmund Freud and C.G. Jung, Hogarth Press, 1977, ISBN 9780710086648
- The Complete Correspondence of Sigmund Freud and Karl Abraham, 1907–1925, Karnac Books, 2002, ISBN 978-1-85575-051-7
- The Letters of Sigmund Freud to Jeanne Lampl-de Groot, 1921–1939: Psychoanalysis and Politics in the Interwar Years. Edited By Gertie Bögels. London: Routledge 2022.
- The Complete Correspondence of Sigmund Freud and Ernest Jones, 1908–1939., Belknap Press, Harvard University Press, 1995, ISBN 978-0-674-15424-7
- The Sigmund Freud – Ludwig Binswanger Correspondence 1908–1939, London: Other Press 2003, ISBN 1-892746-32-8
- The Correspondence of Sigmund Freud and Sándor Ferenczi, Vol 1, 1908–1914, Belknap Press, Harvard University Press, 1994, ISBN 978-0-674-17418-4
- The Correspondence of Sigmund Freud and Sándor Ferenczi, Vol 2, 1914–1919, Belknap Press, Harvard University Press, 1996, ISBN 978-0-674-17419-1
- The Correspondence of Sigmund Freud and Sándor Ferenczi, Vol 3, 1920–1933, Belknap Press, Harvard University Press, 2000, ISBN 978-0-674-00297-5
- The Letters of Sigmund Freud to Eduard Silberstein, 1871–1881, Belknap Press, Harvard University Press, ISBN 978-0-674-52828-4
- Psycho-Analysis and Faith: The Letters of Sigmund Freud and Oskar Pfister. Trans. Eric Mosbacher. Heinrich Meng and Ernst L. Freud. eds London: Hogarth Press and the Institute of Psycho-Analysis, 1963.
- Sigmund Freud and Lou Andreas-Salome; Letters, Harcourt Brace Jovanovich; 1972, ISBN 978-0-15-133490-2
- The Letters of Sigmund Freud and Arnold Zweig, New York University Press, 1987, ISBN 978-0-8147-2585-6
- Why War? Open Letters Between Einstein and Freud. London: New Commonwealth, 1934.
- Letters of Sigmund Freud, selected and edited by Ernst L. Freud, New York: Basic Books, 1960, ISBN 978-0-486-27105-7

== See also ==
- The Standard Edition of the Complete Psychological Works of Sigmund Freud
- Sigmund Freud Archives
- Freud Museum (London)
- Sigmund Freud Museum (Vienna)
- A Clinical Lesson at the Salpêtrière – 1887 group tableau portrait by André Brouillet
- Afterwardsness
- Freud crater on the Moon
- Freudian slip
- Freudo-Marxism
- School of Brentano
- Hedgehog's dilemma
- Narcissism of small differences
- Hidden personality
- Histrionic personality disorder
- List of Austrian writers
- Psychoanalytic literary criticism
- Psychodynamics
- Saul Rosenzweig
- Signorelli parapraxis
- The Freudian Coverup
- The Passions of the Mind
- Uncanny

== Notes ==
Awards and achievements
Preceded by Patrick Hastings	Cover of Time Magazine; 27 October 1924	Succeeded by Thomas Lipton
Preceded by Leopold Ziegler	Goethe Prize; 1930	Succeeded by Ricarda Huch
