= Glossary of psychoanalysis =

Psychoanalysis is a set of theories and therapeutic techniques that deal in part with the unconscious mind, and which together form a method of treatment for mental disorders.

== A ==
- Acathexis
- Afterwardsness
- Anal eroticism
- Anal expulsiveness
- Anal retentiveness
- Anticathexis
- Antinarcissism
- Aphanisis

== B ==
- Basic hostility
- Body cathexis

== C ==
- Cassandra (metaphor)
- Catharsis
- Cathexis
- Censorship (psychoanalysis)
- Complex (psychology)
- Condensation (psychology)
- Construction (psychoanalysis)
- Counterphobic attitude

== D ==
- Death drive
- Decathexis
- Decompensation
- Defence mechanism
- Deferred obedience
- Delayed gratification
- Demand (psychoanalysis)
- Displacement (psychology)
- Drive theory

== E ==
- Electra complex
- Eros (concept)

== F ==
- Fixation (psychology)
- Foreclosure (psychoanalysis)
- Four discourses
- Freudian slip

== G ==
- Gaze
- Gender inequality
- Graph of desire

== I ==
- Id, ego and super-ego
- Identification (psychology)
- Identification with the Aggressor
- The Imaginary (psychoanalysis)
- Intellectualization
- Interpellation (philosophy)
- Introjection
- Inversive

== J ==
- Jocasta complex
- Jouissance

== L ==
- Lack (psychoanalysis)
- Laius complex
- Lapsus
- Libido
- Love and hate (psychoanalysis)

== M ==
- Madonna–whore complex
- Matheme
- Medusa complex
- Mirror stage
- Mortido

== N ==
- Name of the Father
- Narcissistic defences
- Narcissistic elation
- Narcissistic injury
- Narcissistic mortification
- Narcissistic neurosis
- Narcissistic personality disorder
- Narcissistic supply
- Narcissistic withdrawal
- Negative transference

== O ==
- Objet petit a
- Oceanic feeling
- Oedipus complex
- Ophelia complex
- Organ language
- Overdetermination

== P ==
- Pansexuality
- Parataxic distortion
- Parataxical Integration
- Penis envy
- Phaedra complex
- Pleasure principle (psychology)
- Polymorphous perversity
- Postponement of affect
- Preconscious
- Primal scene
- Projective identification
- Psychic apparatus
- Psychical inertia
- Psychological projection
- Psychological resistance

== R ==
- Rationalization (psychology)
- Reaction formation
- The Real
- Regression (psychology)
- Reparation (psychoanalysis)
- Repetition compulsion
- Repressed memory
- Repression (psychoanalysis)
- Resistance (psychoanalysis)

== S ==
- Screen memory
- Self-envy
- Signorelli parapraxis
- Sinthome
- Sublimation (psychology)
- Symbolic equation
- The Symbolic

== T ==
- Taboo
- Transference
- Transference neurosis
- True self and false self

== U ==
- Uncanny
- Unconscious cognition
- Unconscious mind
- Undoing (psychology)

== V ==
- Vanishing mediator

== See also ==
- Glossary of psychiatry
