= Anticathexis =

Psychoanalytic concept

In psychoanalysis, anticathexis, or countercathexis, is the energy used by the ego to bind the primitive impulses of the id. Sometimes the ego follows the instructions of the superego in doing so; sometimes however it develops a double-countercathexis, so as to block feelings of guilt and anxiety deriving from the superego, as well as id impulses.

== Repression and isolation ==
Freud saw the establishment of a permanent anticathexis as a prerequisite for successful psychological repression. He also saw countercathexis as playing a central role in isolation.

In a late work, Freud further distinguished between the external anticathexis of repression and what he called “internal anticathexis" (i.e. alteration of the ego through reaction formation).

== Figure-ground ==
Anticathexis has also been linked to the phenomenon of figure-ground, in that it may entail the suppression of the margin or ground of a perceptual field.

== See also ==
- Acathexis
- Body cathexis
- Cathexis
- Decathexis
- Psychological resistance
