= Negation (Freud) =

Rejecting a fact too uncomfortable to accept

Denial, abnegation or negation (German: Verleugnung, Verneinung) is a psychological defense mechanism postulated by psychoanalyst Sigmund Freud, in which a person is faced with a fact that is too uncomfortable to accept and rejects it instead, insisting that it is not true despite what may be overwhelming evidence.

The subject may use:

- simple denial: deny the reality of the unpleasant fact altogether
- minimisation: admit the fact but deny its seriousness (a combination of denial and rationalization)
- projection: admit both the fact and seriousness but deny responsibility by blaming somebody or something else

== Description ==
The theory of denial was first researched seriously by Anna Freud. She classified denial as a mechanism of the immature mind because it conflicts with the ability to learn from and cope with reality. Where denial occurs in mature minds, it is most often associated with death, dying and rape. More recent research has significantly expanded the scope and utility of the concept. Elisabeth Kübler-Ross used denial as the first of five stages in the psychology of a dying patient, and the idea has been extended to include the reactions of survivors to news of a death.

Many contemporary psychoanalysts treat denial as the first stage of a coping cycle. When an unwelcome change occurs, a trauma of some sort, the first impulse to disbelieve begins the process of coping. That denial, in a healthy mind, slowly rises to greater consciousness. Gradually becoming a subconscious pressure, just beneath the surface of overt awareness, the mechanism of coping then involves repression, while the person accumulates the emotional resources to fully face the trauma. Once faced, the person deals with the trauma in a stage alternately called acceptance or enlightenment, depending on the scope of the issue and the therapist's school of thought. After this stage, once sufficiently dealt with, or dealt with for the time being, the trauma must sink away from total conscious awareness again. Left out of the conscious mind, the process of sublimation involves a balance of neither quite forgetting nor quite remembering. This allows the trauma to re-emerge in consciousness if it involves an ongoing process such as a protracted illness. Alternately, sublimation may begin the full resolution process, where the trauma finally sinks away into eventual forgetfulness. Occasionally this entire cycle has been referred to in modern parlance as denial, confusing the full cycle with only one stage of it. To further muddy discourse, the terms denial and cycle of denial sometimes get used to refer to an unhealthy, dysfunctional cycle of unresolved coping, particularly with regard to addiction and compulsion.

Unlike some other defense mechanisms postulated by psychoanalytic theory (for instance, repression), the general existence of denial is fairly easy to verify, even for non-specialists. However, denial is one of the most controversial defense mechanisms, since it can be easily used to create unfalsifiable theories: anything the subject says or does that appears to disprove the interpreter's theory is explained, not as evidence that the interpreter's theory is wrong, but as the subject's being "in denial". However, researchers note that in some cases of corroborated child sexual abuse, the victims sometimes make a series of partial confessions and recantations as they struggle with their own denial and the denial of abusers or family members. Use of denial theory in a legal setting, therefore, is carefully regulated and experts' credentials verified. "Formulaic guilt" simply by "being a denier" has been castigated by English judges and academics. The main objection is that denial theory is founded on the premise that which the supposed denier is denying the truth. This usurps the judge (and jury) as triers of fact.

Denial is especially characteristic of mania, hypomania, and generally of people with bipolar affective disorder in the manic stage – in this state, one can deny, remarkably a long period of time, the fact that one has fatigue, hunger, negative emotions and problems in general, until one is physically exhausted.

== Denial and disavowal ==
Freud employs the term Verleugnung (usually translated either as "disavowal" or as "denial") as distinct from Verneinung (usually translated as "denial" or as "abnegation"). In Verleugnung, the defense consists of denying something that affects the individual and is a way of affirming what he or she is apparently denying. For Freud, Verleugnung is related to psychoses, whereas Verdrängung is a neurotic defense mechanism. Freud broadened his clinical work on disavowal beyond the realm of psychosis. In "Fetishism" (1927), he reported a case of two young men each of whom denied the death of his father. Freud notes that neither of them developed a psychosis, even though "a piece of reality which was undoubtedly important has been disavowed [verleugnet], just as the unwelcome fact of women's castration is disavowed in fetishists."

== Types ==
=== Denial of fact ===
In this form of denial, someone avoids a fact by utilizing deception. This lying can take the form of an outright falsehood (commission), leaving out certain details to tailor a story (omission), or by falsely agreeing to something (assent). Someone who is in denial of fact is typically using lies to avoid facts they think may be painful to themselves or others.

=== Denial of responsibility ===
This form of denial involves avoiding personal responsibility by:

- blaming: a direct statement shifting culpability and may overlap with denial of fact
- minimizing: an attempt to make the effects or results of an action appear to be less harmful than they may actually be
- justifying: when someone takes a choice and attempts to make that choice appear acceptable due to their perception of what is right in a situation
- regression: when someone acts in a way unbecoming of their age

Someone using denial of responsibility is usually attempting to avoid potential harm or pain by shifting attention away from themselves.

=== Denial of impact ===
Denial of impact involves a person's avoiding thinking about or understanding the harms of his or her behavior has caused to self or others, i.e. denial of consequences. Doing this enables that person to avoid feeling a sense of guilt and it can prevent him or her from developing remorse or empathy for others. Denial of impact reduces or eliminates a sense of pain or harm from poor decisions.

=== Denial of awareness ===
This form of denial attempts to divert pain by claiming that the level of awareness was inhibited by some mitigating variable. This is most typically seen in addiction situations where drug or alcohol abuse is a factor, though it also occasionally manifests itself in relation to mental health issues or the pharmaceutical substances used to treat mental health issues. This form of denial may also overlap with denial of responsibility.

== See also ==
- Screen memory
