= Decathexis =

Psychoanalytic concept

In psychoanalysis, decathexis is the withdrawal of cathexis from an idea or instinctual object.

Decathexis is the process of dis-investment of mental or emotional energy in a person, object, or idea.

== Narcissism ==
In narcissistic neurosis, cathexis is withdrawn from external instinctual objects (or rather their unconscious representations) and turned on the ego – a process Freud highlighted in the Schreber case, and linked to the subject's ensuing megalomania.

A similar decathexis of energy has been linked to the emergence of symptoms of hypochondriasis, as well as of melancholia.

André Green saw decathexis as the product of the death drive, blanking out the possibility of thinking by a process of what he called de-objectilizing.

== Grief ==
Decathexis of the lost person in grief was seen as a regular part of the mourning process by Freud, although later analysts have argued that such decathexis was rather the result of inhibited or partial mourning, not of successful mourning.

== See also ==
- Acathexis
- Anticathexis
- Narcissistic personality disorder
