= Cathexis =

Psychoanalytic concept of allocation of emotional energy

In psychoanalysis, cathexis (or emotional investment) is defined as the process of allocation of mental or emotional energy to a person, object, or idea.

== Origin of term ==
The Greek term cathexis (κάθεξις) was chosen by James Strachey to render the German term Besetzung in his translation of Sigmund Freud's complete works. Freud himself used the word "interest" in English in an early letter to Ernest Jones.

Peter Gay objected that Strachey's use of cathexis was an unnecessarily esoteric replacement for Freud's use of Besetzung – "a word from common German speech rich in suggestive meanings, among them 'occupation' (by troops) and 'charge' (of electricity)", though Gay is mistaken regarding his latter example. (Note: Freud uses the expressions "Besetzung mit Energie" and "mit Energie besetzen" (with the noun "Besetzung" and the verb "besetzen") to refer to "allocation of energy" and "to allocate energy".)

== Usage ==
Freud defined cathexis as an allocation of libido, pointing out for example how dream thoughts were charged with different amounts of affect. A cathexis or allocation of emotional charge might be positive or negative, leading some of his followers to speak of a cathexis of mortido as well. Freud called a group of cathected ideas a complex.

Freud frequently described the functioning of psychosexual energies in quasi-physical terms, representing frustration of libidinal desires, for example, as a blockage of (cathected) energies which would eventually build up and require release in alternative ways. This release could occur, for example, by way of regression and the "re-cathecting" of former positions or fixations, or the autoerotic enjoyment (in phantasy) of former sexual objects: "object-cathexes".

Freud used the term "anti-cathexis" or counter-charge to describe how the ego blocks such regressive efforts to discharge one's cathexis: that is, when the ego wishes to repress such desires. Like a steam engine, the libido's cathexis then builds up until it finds alternative outlets, which can lead to sublimation, reaction formation, or the construction of (sometimes disabling) symptoms.

M. Scott Peck distinguishes between love and cathexis, with cathexis being the initial in-love phase of a relationship, and love being the ongoing commitment of care. Cathexis, to Peck, is distinguished from love by its dynamic element.

== Object relations ==
Freud saw the early cathexis of objects with libidinal energy as a central aspect of human development. In describing the withdrawal of cathexes which accompanied the mourning process, Freud provided his major contribution to the foundation of object relations theory.

== Thinking ==
Freud saw thinking as an experimental process involving minimal amounts of cathexis, "in the same way as a general shifts small figures about on a map".

In delusions, it was the hypercathexis (or over-charging) of ideas previously dismissed as odd or eccentric which he saw as causing the subsequent pathology.

== Art ==
Eric Berne raised the possibility that child art often represented the intensity of cathexis invested in an object, rather than its objective form.

== Criticism ==
Critics charge that the term provides a potentially misleading neurophysiological analogy, which might be applicable to the cathexis of ideas but certainly not of objects.

Further ambiguity in Freud's usage emerges in the contrast between cathexis as a measurable load of (undifferentiated) libido, and as a qualitatively distinct type of affect – as in a "cathexis of longing".

== See also ==
- Acathexis
- Anal fixation
- Body cathexis
- Condensation (psychology)
- Decathexis
- Oral stage
- Psychological resistance
