= Transference neurosis =

Freudian concept

Psychoanalysis
- ICD-9-CM: 94.31
- MeSH: D011572

Transference neurosis is a term that Sigmund Freud introduced in 1914 to describe a new form of the analysand's infantile neurosis that develops during the psychoanalytic process. Based on Dora's case history, Freud suggested that during therapy the creation of new symptoms stops, but new versions of the patient's fantasies and impulses are generated. He called these newer versions "transferences" and characterized them as the substitution of the analyst for a person from the patient's past. According to Freud's description: "a whole series of psychological experiences are revived not as belonging to the past, but as applying to the person of the analyst at the present moment". When transference neurosis develops, the relationship with the therapist becomes the most important one for the patient, who directs strong infantile feelings and conflicts towards the therapist, e.g. the patient may react as if the analyst is his/her father.

== Basic characteristics ==
Transference neurosis can be distinguished from other kinds of transference because:

1. It is very vivid and it rekindles the infantile neurosis.
2. It is generated by the feelings of frustration that the analysand inevitably experiences during sessions, since the analyst does not fulfill the analysand's longings.
3. In transference neurosis the symptoms are not stable, but they are transformed.
4. Regression and repetition play a key role in the creation of transference neurosis.
5. Transference neurosis reveals the particular meanings that the analysand has given to current infantile relationships and events, which generate internal conflicts between wishes and particular defenses formed to strive against them. These meanings are united and create several transference patterns.

== Resolution ==
Once transference neurosis has developed, it leads to a form of resistance, called "transference resistance". At this point, the analysis of the transference becomes difficult since new obstacles arise in therapy, e.g. the analysand may insist on fulfilling the infantile wishes that emerged in transference, or may refuse to acknowledge that the current experience is, in fact, a reproduction of a past experience. However, the successful resolution of transference neurosis through interpretation will lead to the lifting of repression and will enable the Ego to solve the infantile conflicts in new ways. Furthermore, it will allow the analysand to recognize that the current relationship with the analyst is based on repetition of childhood experiences, leading to the detachment of the patient from the analyst.

The replacement of the infantile neurosis by transference neurosis and its resolution through interpretation remains the main focus of the classical psychoanalytic therapy. In other types of therapy, either the transference neurosis does not develop at all, or it does not play a central role in the therapy process. Although it is more likely for transference neurosis to develop in psychoanalysis, where the sessions are more frequent, it may also appear during psychotherapy.

== See also ==
- Infatuation in transference
- Narcissistic neurosis
- Neurosis
- Psychoanalysis
- Psychotherapy
- Transference

== Sources ==
1. Sigmund Freud, "Case Histories 1 – Dora and Little Hans", The Penguin Freud Library, Volume 8, 1990.
2. R. Horacio Etchegoyen, "The Fundamentals of Psychoanalytic Technique", Karnac Books, London, 1991.
3. Richard D. Chessick, "Psychoanalytic Peregrinations I: Transference and Transference Neurosis Revisited", Journal of the American Academy of Psychoanalysis, 30(1), 83–97, 2002.
4. W. W. Meissner, "A Note on Transference and Alliance: I. Transference – Variations on a Theme", Bulletin of the Menninger Clinic, Vol. 65, No. 2 (Spring 2001.
5. "Transference Neurosis" International Dictionary of Psychoanalysis. The Gale Group, Inc, 2005. Answers.com http://www.answers.com/topic/transference-neurosis.
6. "Resolution of the Transference" International Dictionary of Psychoanalysis. The Gale Group, Inc, 2005. Answers.com http://www.answers.com/topic/resolution-of-the-transference.
7. Stephen A. Mitchell, Margaret J. Black: "Freud and Beyond: a History of Modern Psychoanalytic Thought". Basic Books, 1995.
