= Preconscious =

Concept in psychoanalysis

In psychoanalysis, the preconscious is the locus preceding consciousness. Thoughts are preconscious when they are unconscious at a particular moment, but are not repressed. Therefore, preconscious thoughts are available for recall and easily 'capable of becoming conscious'—a phrase attributed by Sigmund Freud to Josef Breuer.

Freud contrasted the preconscious (German: das Vorbewusste) to both the conscious (das Bewusste) and the unconscious (das Unbewusste) in his topographical system of the mind.

The preconscious can also refer to information available for cognitive processing, but that currently lies outside conscious awareness. One of the most common forms of preconscious processing is priming. Other common forms of preconscious processing are tip of the tongue phenomena and blindsight.

== Freud's 'Topographical' System ==
In 1900, in his book Interpretation of Dreams, Freud introduced the notion that the unconscious mind is not merely the opposite of consciousness. Instead, he insisted that there exist two spheres in the unconscious: unconscious and preconscious. He reserved the term unconscious for thoughts that are inadmissible to consciousness, while the term preconscious was used to denote the screen between the unconscious and conscious. The preconscious restricts access to consciousness and is responsible for voluntary movement and attention. Freud further explained the distinction as follows:

". . . two kinds of unconscious—one which is easily, under frequently occurring circumstances, transformed into something conscious, and another with which this transformation is difficult and takes place only subject to a considerable expenditure of effort or possibly never at all. [...] We call the unconscious which is only latent, and thus easily becomes conscious, the 'preconscious', and retain the term 'unconscious' for the other".

As explained by David Stafford-Clark,

"If consciousness is then the sum total of everything of which we are aware, pre-consciousness is the reservoir of everything we can remember, all that is accessible to voluntary recall: the storehouse of memory. This leaves the unconscious area of mental life to contain all the more primitive drives and impulses influencing our actions without our necessarily ever becoming fully aware of them, together with every important constellation of ideas or memories with a strong emotional charge, which have at one time been present in consciousness but have since been repressed so that they are no longer available to it, even through introspection or attempts at memory".

Freud's original German term for the preconscious was das Vorbewusste, the unconscious being das Unbewusste.

=== Characteristics ===
Freud saw the preconscious as characterised by reality-testing, recallable memories, and (above all) links to word-presentations—the key distinction from the contents of the unconscious. In Chapter 2 of his book, The Ego and the ID, Freud explains that the real difference between an unconscious idea and a preconscious idea is that unconscious ideas are based on unknown material, whereas preconscious ideas are usually brought into consciousness via connections with word-presentations. Word-presentations are memory traces that were at one time a perception, and therefore, can become conscious again. The only way, then, he stated, for something from the unconscious to be brought into the preconscious was by supplying the preconscious with the intermediate links that connect the unconscious thought with an associated word or picture in the preconscious.

=== Relation to the Ego, Id, and Superego ===
The above-described distinctions between the conscious, preconscious, and unconscious represent Freud's spatial systems of the mind. In 1923, in addition to these spatial dimensions, Freud introduced three distinct, interacting agents of the mind: the id, ego and superego. These three agents are separate and distinct, though somewhat overlapping with Freud's earlier division between conscious, preconscious, and unconscious.

The ego is the coherent organizational of mental processes, often to which consciousness is attached, but it can also exist in the preconscious by censoring content in the unconscious. The ego is capable of exerting resistance on mental material, and therefore, it is also capable of being unconscious in the dynamic sense. The id is the wholly unconscious agent of the mind that consists of drives and repressed material. The ego and the id interact, as the ego seeks to bring the influence of the external world to bear on the id. In short, the ego represents reason and common sense, and the id contains deep-seated passions. The superego represents an ideal self defined in childhood, largely shaped by the resolution of the Oedipal conflict.

== In Therapy ==
Much of the work of the therapist takes place at a preconscious level in a clinical situation. Conversely, it is possible to distinguish among the patient's products preconscious transference phantasies from unconscious ones.

Eric Berne considered that the preconscious covered a much wider area of the mind than was generally recognised, a 'cult' of the unconscious leading to its over-estimation by both analyst and analysand.

== See also ==
- Consciousness
- Jacques Lacan
- Philosophy of mind
- Rapid eye movement sleep
- Subliminal perception
- Unconscious mind
