= Acathexis =

Psychoanalytic term

Acathexis is a psychoanalytic term for a lack of emotional response to significant memories or actual interactions, where such a response would normally be expected.

The term also refers more broadly to a general absence of normal or expected feelings.

Acathexis has been linked to anxiety, bipolar disorder and dementia, while the phenomenon also appears in posttraumatic stress disorder.

== Theoretical context: Freud and the economic view ==
The concept of acathexis is best understood in relation to Sigmund Freud's notion of cathexis, which describes the investment of psychic energy (libido) into a person, object, or idea. In psychoanalytic terms, this reflects a form of "occupying" or "charging" a mental representation with energy.

From an economic perspective, the psyche is viewed as a system where psychic energy is limited and must be distributed efficiently; cathexis represents this directed energy, whereas acathexis denotes the absence of such investment, or a failure of attachment in situations where emotional engagement would typically occur.

The dynamic interplay between cathexis and anticathexis—where the ego attempts to regulate or suppress instinctual energy—further illustrates that repression and emotional withdrawal are energetically costly processes, reinforcing the conceptual weight of acathexis within psychoanalytic theory.

Etymologically, the translation of Freud's German term Besetzung into cathexis by James Strachey underscores the militaristic metaphor of energy "occupying" psychic terrain, vividly illustrating how libidinal energy can be focused or withdrawn from particular mental representations.

== See also ==
- Alexithymia
- Anhedonia
- Anticathexis
- Body cathexis
- Cathexis
- Decathexis
- Flattened affect
