= Censorship (psychoanalysis) =

Barrier of the conscious and unconscious

In psychoanalysis, Censorship (Zensur) is the force identified by Sigmund Freud as operating to separate consciousness from the unconscious mind.

== In dreaming ==
In his 1899 The Interpretation of Dreams, Freud identified a force working to disguise the dream-thoughts so as to make them more acceptable to the dreamer. In his wartime lectures, he compared its operation to the contemporary newspapers, where blanks would reveal first-hand the work of the censor, but where allusions, circumlocutions, and other softening techniques also showed attempts to work round the censorship of thoughts in advance. He went on to characterise the motivating force, which he called "the self-observing agency as the ego-censor [Zensor], the conscience; it is this that exercises the dream-censorship [Zensur] during the night, from which the repressions of inadmissable wishful impulses proceed".

Another tool used by the dream-censorship was regression to archaic symbolic forms of expression unfamiliar to the conscious mind. Where all such measures of censorship failed, however, the result could be the development of nightmares and insomnia.

== Psychoanalytic extensions ==
Freud found the same effects of disguise and omission taking place in the construction of neurotic symptoms, under the influence of the censorship, as in dreams. He would eventually assign the role of censor to the mental agency he would term the superego.

== Criticism ==
Sartre questioned how the censorship could operate unless it was already aware of the contents of the unconscious, and thought the phenomena Freud described could be better understood in terms of bad faith.

== See also ==
- Ego ideal
- Screen memory
- Superego resistance
