= Mourning and Melancholia =

1917 work by Sigmund Freud

- Author: Sigmund Freud
- Original title: Trauer und Melancholie
- Language: German
- Subjects: Mourning; Melancholia
- Publication date: 1917
- Publication place: Germany

"Mourning and Melancholia" (German: Trauer und Melancholie) is a 1917 work of Sigmund Freud, the founder of psychoanalysis.

In this essay, Freud argues that mourning and melancholia are similar but different responses to loss. In mourning, a person deals with the grief of losing a specific love object, and this process takes place in the conscious mind. In melancholia, a person grieves for a loss they are unable to fully comprehend or identify, and thus this process takes place in the unconscious mind. Mourning is considered a healthy and natural process of grieving a loss, while melancholia is considered pathological.

It has been argued by some writers that Freud's description of mourning in this work is not compatible with current models of mourning.

== Bibliography ==
- Freud, Sigmund (1914–1916). The Standard Edition of the Complete Psychological Works of Sigmund Freud, Volume XIV, On The History of Psycho-Analytic Movement, Papers on Metapsychology and Other Works (PDF). London: Hogarth Press and the Institute of Psycho-Analysis. "The book link is to Sigmund Freud's essay "Mourning and Melacholia" which has been extracted from the book".
