= Construction (psychoanalysis) =

Topic of modern psychoanalysis

Construction, also referred to as construction/reconstruction is a widely used, yet vaguely defined topic of modern psychoanalysis. According to its proponents, Freud in his later writings had already distinguished between construction and interpretation, hence construction/reconstruction is a kind of "upgrade" of interpretation. There is a strong difference between simple interpretation and construction concerning how to see the past. In the interpretations the past is discovered as a preexisting phenomenon, while in the construction the past is not just simply found, but it is also created.

In the therapeutic setting, a simple interpretation of the patient's claims is usually leading to a counterproductive debate about who is more correct, the patient or the analyst. The construction is attended to overcome this debate by using only the patient's material, without the invasions from the analyst's side (a resemblance to methods of Malan and Davanloo).

The patient, unable to avoid the truth (the situation that his/her truth is discovered), is either producing a confession (hence validating the construction), or producing further fantasies and associations.

A professionally led construction is inescapable, as it does not use persuasion, paradoxical intentions, etc. Elements of construction are traceable e.g. in the intensive short-term dynamic psychotherapy, in Reid's interrogation technique, or in diplomatic/political discourses (e.g. William Ury's approach in Getting to Yes).

== Criticism ==
Although construction is claimed to be a nondirective approach (it uses no contamination of the revealed psychic material), the main criticism targets the effect of construction on human freedom and dignity. Some critics state that the construction is especially attractive for those therapists who themselves are missing some parts of their own personality, and who by "depatterning" and "reassembling" the patient (see. Donald E. Cameron) are repeating their own personal losses.
