= Body cathexis =

Degree of satisfaction one feels towards their own body

Body cathexis is defined as the degree of satisfaction or dissatisfaction one feels towards various parts and aspects of their own body. This evaluative dimension of body image is dependent on a person's investment of mental and emotional energy in body size, parts, shape, processes, and functions, and is integral to one's sense of self-concept. First recognized by Jourard and Secord, body cathexis is assessed by examining correlations between measures of self-concept or esteem and bodily attitudes. An individual's evaluation of their own body tends to drive various behaviors, including clothing choices and weight management, and the existence of a universal ideal for certain dimensions of body type is, in many cases, a source of anxiety and insecurity.

While the body has been studied by psychologists from numerous different viewpoints, few recent reports of systematic empirical research into feelings about the body exist. However, body cathexis is of crucial importance to understanding personality, since feelings about the body closely correspond to feelings about the self and produce marked behavioral consequences. Due to the substantial amount of attention individuals devote to the grooming and concern for bodily appearance, body cathexis is believed to be intrinsically related to the self-concept, with high self-esteem and self-acceptance serving as preventive factors against body dissatisfaction.

Among females in particular, one's general attitude about the body is a significant personality variable with mental health implications. Recent studies have examined the effects of bodily attitudes on consumer dissatisfaction or satisfaction with fit of apparel, disordered eating, and participation in weight loss programs.

== Body Cathexis Scale ==
First introduced by Secord and Jourard in 1953, the Body Cathexis Scale provides an objective measure of one's feelings towards various aspects of their body. Originally composed of 46 items, the questionnaire asks individuals to indicate the strength and direction of feeling he or she has about certain bodily parts and functions according to a five-point Likert scale ranging from 1, “strongly negative,” to 5, “strongly positive.”

The body cathexis items used in the scale include body characteristics such as “width of shoulders,” “facial complexion,” and “body build.” Individuals are to consider each of the items listed and assign a numerical score that best represents their feelings about the various body aspects. Total body cathexis (BC) is obtained by summing the ratings for each of the 46 characteristics and dividing by total number of items.

== Body image and the self ==
Body image is one of the most significant components of an individual's self-concept. One's perception of their body and the feelings associated with this perceived image greatly influence overall satisfaction with the self and can predict levels of self-esteem. The relationship between body image and the self-concept has been investigated extensively by Secord and Jourard, and as their research indicates, self-esteem scores and personal identification are highly correlated with body cathexis, acceptance, and overall satisfaction with physical body traits and functions.

Among the few empirical studies relevant to the relatedness of the body and the self is that of Schilder, who – through a series of self-report questionnaires – procured evidence suggesting that negative feelings, associations, and memories about the body can probe higher levels of dissatisfaction with the self. In approaching the problem of body cathexis appraisal, Secord and Jourard adapted Shilder's methods to test their hypothesis that feelings about the body are correlated with overall feelings about the self. In their study, the researchers developed a method for assessing an individual's feelings towards their bodily features in order to ascertain whether or not the variables attained through these methods are relevant to personality theory. Using scales of body cathexis and self cathexis, the Maslow Test of Psychological Security-Insecurity, and an anxiety-related body cathexis homonym test, Secord and Jourard concluded that the body and self tend to be cathected to the same degree. Consequently, as suggested by the results of both the body cathexis and self cathexis scales (which represent attitudes about conceptual aspects of the self in correlation to the body), low body cathexis is significantly associated with anxiety, insecurity, and negative perceptions of the self.

Likewise, an individual's perception of self-worth is a fluctuating attitude that can rise and fall with changing components of the physical self. This attitude, coined self-esteem, is an evaluative component of the psychological self that is partially dependent upon one's satisfaction with physical appearance. As various studies indicate, changes in body composition, perceptions of physical attractiveness, and overall body condition provide inferential support for the claim that body image is related to an individual's self-esteem and perceived worth.

== Sex differences ==
Because body image and body weight are a high priority in western culture, men and women alike face gender-based societal pressures to achieve an ideal body image, which in turn influences feelings about the body and preoccupation with size, shape, weight, and appearance. According to Salusso-Deonier and Schwarzkopf, gender is a salient factor in body image development, and due to sex differences in the management and enhancement of appearance, females tend to exhibit more negative cathexis responses to the body and self as compared to men.

As their study suggests, body cathexis scores among females tend to decrease as body type varies from the ideal thin, while body cathexis scores among males show similar trends when one's perceived body is fatter or thinner than the muscular ideal. However, though previous literature demonstrates that both men and women are concerned with weight and appearance, men generally have higher body cathexis than women. Cultural scripting, particularly male socialization that fosters exercise involvement and physical fitness, may be partially responsible for higher body cathexis scores among males, since participation in fitness activities tends to yield significant improvement in body satisfaction. Similarly, dysphoric body image experiences often mediated by specific contextual cues also promote sizable sex differences in body cathexis and the occurrence of negative body image emotions. Relative to men, women are more strongly invested in their looks and tend to report a more negative overall body image evaluation. As the findings of their study confirm, Muth and Cash suggest that the gender-differential societal and personal standards of body attractiveness place women at a higher predisposition for less favorable, more invested, and more distressing body image attitudes.

== Associated behaviors ==
Feelings about the body have marked behavioral consequences, and as both casual and clinical observations suggest, body cathexis and body perceptions play a significant role in garment fit satisfaction. While the physical dimensions and product design of apparel are partially responsible for consumers’ dissatisfaction with clothing fit, consumers are often quick to blame themselves and their body type when a product does not work. For females in particular, fashionable clothing is often designed to fit a specific body type; thus, when a clothing article does not fit properly, the consumer tends to blame the poor fit on their body and not the design of the apparel – a result of the individual's low body cathexis.

Similarly, social stimuli may play a reciprocal role in anticipating behavior, contributing to the formation of negative feelings about the body. Since consumers often rely on social information and preconceived notions of the ideal body image when shaping their self-concept, apparel fit may contribute to body cathexis and overall feelings about the self. Therefore, dissatisfaction with the fit of garments can lead to lower body cathexis and negative attitudes regarding overall appearance, body dimensions, and weight.

Along with garment fit satisfaction, research also indicates that body image attitudes and emotions may be correlated with disordered eating behaviors. Body dissatisfaction, especially negative attitudes about weight, is a significant risk factor for the development of depressive symptoms and low self-esteem, as well as unhealthy weight control strategies, such as skipping meals, fasting, crash dieting, and self-induced purging. Low body cathexis and preoccupation can contribute to the development of eating disorders among female adolescents in particular, often a result of societal pressures and expectations to achieve the ideal, thin body type.

== See also ==
- Acathexis
- Decathexis
- Anticathexis
