= Screen memory =

Psychological concept

A screen memory is a distorted memory, generally of a visual rather than verbal nature, deriving from childhood. The term was coined by Sigmund Freud, and the concept was the subject of his 1899 paper "Screen Memories". In this paper, Freud reported his own memory, but, because it "featured Freud's secret preoccupation as a youth with masturbatory fantasies of deflowering a virgin, he disguised his analysis. By means of an imaginary dialogue, he gave his readers to believe it concerned someone other than himself — in fact one of his patients. It was Siegfried Bernfeld who exposed the secret autobiographical nature of this paper in an essay published after Freud's death."

== Childhood origins ==
Freud was struck by the presence, in himself and in other adults, of vivid but bland memories standing from early childhood; and he came to believe that their strength and their preservation both derived from their association with other, less innocent infantile occurrences. As he concluded in his 1899 paper, "the falsified memory is the first that we become aware of: the raw material of memory-traces out of which it was forged remains unknown to us in its original form."

Later writers have emphasised the element of psychological trauma underpinning the screen memory, as well as the way it can encapsulate in miniature the core conflicts of childhood.

== Denial and memory construction ==
The construction of the screen memory turns on the balance between memory and denial. The blocking of an unpleasant event, thought or perception is facilitated if some harmless, but associated, object can be substituted for the unpleasantness itself. The ego searches for memories that can serve as "screens" for the unpleasantness behind, which is thereby removed from consciousness.

== Related applications ==
- Freud considered sexual fetishism as cognate to screen memories, the fetish serving as a screen for infantile sexual strivings.
- Screen memories may also serve as a source for artistic creation – a process that has been followed, for example, with respect to Lewis Carroll.

== See also ==
- Censorship (psychoanalysis)
- Deferred action
- Déjà vu
- Sergei Pankejeff
- Sigmund Freud bibliography
