= American Mental Health Foundation =

Non-profit organization

The American Mental Health Foundation (AMHF) is a charitable not-for-profit 501(c)(3) organization (NGO) that focuses on providing mental health care.

== History ==
AMHF was organized in 1924 and incorporated in New York State on December 29, 1954. Austrian author Hermann Broch, of Princeton University in the 1940s, was a former chairman of AMHF.

== Contemporary activities ==
From 2012 to 2014, AMHF responded to a need, noted by Paul Gionfriddo, for the screening of several thousand youth in a county-wide catchment area. The organization collaborated with Astor Services for Children & Families to identify approximately 15 at-risk individuals who would receive a palliative prevention treatment.

In the summer of 2014, AMHF embarked on a research project with Pearson Assessment to measure older individuals within the serious to profound range of intellectual disabilities for behavioral changes. Such a test would be in the mode of the existing Wechsler, Vineland, and Bayley Scales and have wide-ranging applications. The findings of the AMHF 2-year study with Astor Services for Children & Families were made public in April 2016 as Early Identification, Palliative Care, and Prevention of Psychotic Disorders in Children and Youth.

On April 10, 2016, in a letter published by the New York Times, Evander Lomke of AMHF rebutted the medical practice of "growth attenuation" among young people with serious disabilities. In the same month, AMHF issued a monograph describing their two years of collaborative research with Astor Services for Children & Families regarding early signs of schizophrenia and other psychoses, and options for palliation or prevention. On March 27, 2017, Lomke placed an op-ed in the San Francisco Chronicle on AMHF's behalf, addressing the psychological dimensions of coping with fear, anxiety and social stress, and terrorism.
