= Narcissistic neurosis =

Class of neuroses in psychoanalysis

Narcissistic neurosis is a term introduced by Sigmund Freud to distinguish the class of neuroses characterised by their lack of object relations and their fixation upon the early stage of libidinal narcissism. The term is less current in contemporary psychoanalysis, but still a focus for analytic controversy.

Freud considered such neurosis as impervious to psychoanalytic treatment, as opposed to the transference neurosis where an emotional connection to the analyst was by contrast possible.

== Freud's changing ideas ==
Freud originally applied the term "narcissistic neurosis" to a range of disorders, including perversion, depression, and psychosis. In the 1920s, however, he came to single out "illnesses which are based on a conflict between the ego and the super-ego... we would set aside the name of 'narcissistic psycho-neuroses' for disorders of that kind"—melancholia being the outstanding example.

About the same time, in the wake of the work of Karl Abraham, he began to modify to a degree his view on the inaccessibility of narcissistic neurosis to analytic treatment. However his late lectures from the thirties confirmed his opinion of the unsuitability of narcissistic and psychotic conditions for treatment "to a greater or less extent"; as did his posthumous 'Outline of Psychoanalysis'.

== Later developments ==
From the twenties onwards, Freud's views of the inaccessibility of the narcissistic neuroses to analytic influence had been challenged, first by Melanie Klein, and then by object relations theorists more broadly.

While classical analysts like Robert Waelder would maintain Freud's delimiting standpoint into the sixties, eventually even within ego psychology challenges to the 'off-limits' view of what were increasingly seen as borderline disorders emerged.

Relational psychoanalysis, like Heinz Kohut, would also take a more positive approach to narcissistic neurosis, emphasising the need for a partial or initial participation in the narcissistic illusions.

In retrospect, Freud's caution may be seen as a result of his unwillingness to work with the negative transference, unlike the post-Kleinians.

== See also ==
- Charles Brenner
- Paul Federn
- Transference
