= Psychoanalysis =

Set of therapeutic techniques established by Sigmund Freud

Psychoanalysis (Note: From Greek: ψυχή, psykhḗ, 'soul' and ἀνάλυσις, análysis, 'investigating') comprises a set of theories and techniques to discover unconscious processes and their influence on conscious thought, emotion and behavior. Psychoanalysis is a talk therapy method for treating mental disorders. (Note: "All psychoanalytic theories include the idea that unconscious thoughts and feelings are central in mental functioning." Milton, Jane, Caroline Polmear, and Julia Fabricius. 2011. A Short Introduction to Psychoanalysis. SAGE. p. 27.) (Note: "What is psychoanalysis? Of course, one is supposed to answer that it is many things — a theory, a research method, a therapy, a body of knowledge. In what might be considered an unfortunately abbreviated description, Freud said that anyone who recognizes transference and resistance is a psychoanalyst, even if he comes to conclusions other than his own. … I prefer to think of the analytic situation more broadly, as one in which someone seeking help tries to speak as freely as he can to someone who listens as carefully as he can with the aim of articulating what is going on between them and why. David Rapaport (1967a) once defined the analytic situation as carrying the method of interpersonal relationship to its last consequences." Gill, Merton M. 1999. "Psychoanalysis, Part 1: Proposals for the Future." The Challenge for Psychoanalysis and Psychotherapy: Solutions for the Future. New York: American Mental Health Foundation. Archived 10 June 2009.) Established in the early 1890s by Sigmund Freud, it takes into account Darwin's theory of evolution, neurology findings, ethnology reports, and clinical research, including findings of his mentor Josef Breuer. Freud developed and refined the theory and practice of psychoanalysis until his death in 1939. In an encyclopedic article, he identified four foundational beliefs: "the assumption that there are unconscious mental processes, the recognition of the theory of repression and resistance, the appreciation of the importance of sexuality and of the Oedipus complex."

Two of Freud's early colleagues, Alfred Adler and Carl Jung, soon developed their own methods, individual and analytical psychology, respectively, which he said were not forms of psychoanalysis. After the author's death, neo-Freudian thinkers like Erich Fromm, Karen Horney and Harry Stack Sullivan created some subfields. Jacques Lacan, who referred to his approach as a retour à Freud (return to Freud), described his metapsychology as a technical elaboration of the three-instance model of the psyche and examined the language-like structure of the unconscious.

Psychoanalysis has been a controversial discipline from the outset, although its influence on psychology and psychiatry is undisputed. (Note: "Psychoanalysis has existed before the turn of the 20th century and, in that span of years, has established itself as one of the fundamental disciplines within psychiatry. The science of psychoanalysis is the bedrock of psychodynamic understanding and forms the fundamental theoretical frame of reference for a variety of forms of therapeutic intervention, embracing not only psychoanalysis itself but also various forms of psychoanalytically oriented psychotherapy and related forms of therapy using psychodynamic concepts." Sadock, Benjamin J., and Virginia A. Sadock. 2007. Kaplan and Sadock's Synopsis of Psychiatry (10th ed.). Lippincott Williams & Wilkins. p. 190.) (Note: "Psychoanalysis continues to be an important paradigm organizing the way many psychiatrists think about patients and treatment. However, its limitations are more widely recognized and it is assumed that many important advances in the future will come from other areas, particularly biologic psychiatry. As yet unresolved is the appropriate role of psychoanalytic thinking in organizing the treatment of patients and the training of psychiatrists after that biological revolution has borne fruit. Will treatments aimed at biologic defects or abnormalities become technical steps in a program organized in a psychoanalytic framework? Will psychoanalysis serve to explain and guide supportive intervention for individuals whose lives are deformed by biologic defect and therapeutic interventions, much as it now does for patients with chronic physical illness, with the psychoanalyst on the psychiatric dialysis program? Or will we look back on the role of psychoanalysis in the treatment of the seriously mentally ill as the last and most scientifically enlightened phase of the humanistic tradition in psychiatry, a tradition that became extinct when advances in biology allowed us to cure those we had so long only comforted?" Michels, Robert. 1999. "Psychoanalysis and Psychiatry: A Changing Relationship." The Challenge for Psychoanalysis and Psychotherapy: Solutions for the Future. New York: American Mental Health Foundation. Archived 6 June 2009.) Evidence suggests psychoanalysis, especially long-term psychoanalytic psychotherapy, can be effective for certain disorders, though its overall efficacy remains contested. It may have benefits in the long term over other psychotherapies. Psychoanalytic concepts are also widely used outside the therapeutic field, for example in the interpretation of neurological findings, myths and fairy tales, cultural phenomena, philosophical perspectives such as Freudo-Marxism, and in literary criticism.

== Overview ==
One of Freud's central claims is that the contents of the unconscious largely determine cognition and behavior, describing this as the third insult to mankind. The first was the cosmic discovery by Copernicus that the Earth revolved around the Sun, the second was the biological discovery by Darwin that humans evolved from apes, and the third psychological affront was the discovery by Freud that the ego was not even master of its own home.

Freud found that many of the drives are repressed into the unconscious, which the structural model locates in the 'id', as a result of traumatic experiences during childhood. Attempts to integrate them into the conscious perception of the ego triggers resistance. The individual 'wants' to maintain the repression through defense mechanisms—including censorship, internalized fear of punishment or of loss of love—while the affected instincts resist. An inner war rages between the forces of the id, ego, and superego and can manifest as more or less conspicuous mental disorders. Importantly, Freud did not equate the most common behavior with 'health'. "Health can only be described in metapsychological terms" (assessment of each psychic process according to the coordinates of biological drive economy, dynamics, and topology).

He discovered that the instinctive impulses are expressed in the symbols of dreams and in the symptomatic detours of neuroticism and Freudian slips. Psychoanalysis was developed in order to clarify the causes of disorders and to restore mental health by enabling the ego to become aware of the id's needs and to find realistic, self-controlled ways to satisfy them. Freud summarized this goal of his therapy as "Wo Es war, soll Ich werden" ("Where id was, there ego shall be").

=== Oedipus rising ===
Freud attached great importance to coherence of his structural model. The metapsychological specification of the functions and interlocking of the three instances was intended to ensure the full connectivity of this 'psychic apparatus' with biological sciences, in particular Darwin's theory of evolution of species, including mankind with his natural behavior, thinking ability and technological creativity. Such a model of health is indispensable for the diagnostic process (sickness can only be realized as a deviation from the optimal cooperation of all mental-organic functions), but Freud had to be modest. He came to the conclusion that he had to leave his metapsychological-based model of the soul in the unfinished state of a torso because – as he stated one last time in Moses and Monotheism – there was no well-founded primate research in the first half of 20th century.

Darwin's horde life and its abolition through the introduction of monogamy (as a political agreement between the sons who murdered the horde's polygamous forefather) embodies the evolutionary and the cultural-historical core of psychoanalysis. The aspect of violent elimination of natural horde life is decisive for Freud's Unease in Culture; his assumption of the outbreak of the Oedipus complex in human history is based on it. It led to the formulation of rules of behavior such as the prohibition of adultery and incest, and thus to the beginning of totemic cultures. These rules manifested as customs, traditions, and ritual education, some of which were altered through the intermediate stage of feudalism to modern nations, endowed with their monotheism (which centralized the diversity of totems in an omnipotent, single deity) and hierarchical power structures of military, trade, and politics (see Group Psychology and the Analysis of the Ego).

In Totem and Taboo (1913), Freud extended the Oedipus complex to the origins of culture. Drawing on Darwin's conjecture of a "primal horde," he proposed that a band of brothers killed and devoured their despotic father and, out of remorse and guilt, instituted the prohibitions against murder and incest that he saw as the basis of totemism, morality, and religion. He returned to the thesis in Moses and Monotheism (1939).

According to Freud, this hypothesis explains the present-day son's conflict with his father over his mother, naming this view after Sophocles' tragedy Oedipus Rex, and supplementing it with case studies such as the Analysis of a Phobia in a Five-year-old Boy. He also devised a hypothesis of healthy emotional development, which presupposes the natural relationships of Homo sapiens from birth and takes place in three successive stages: the oral, anal, and genital phases.

=== Traditional setting ===
Psychoanalysts emphasize the importance of early childhood experience and try to overcome infantile amnesia. In a traditional Freudian setting, the patient lies on a couch, and the analyst sits just behind and out of sight. The patient is invited to express all their thoughts, feelings, and fantasies without censorship (free association). In addition to its task of strengthening the ego with its ability to think dialectically – Freud's primacy of the intellect – therapy also aims to induce transference. The patient often projects onto the analyst the parental figures internalized in his superego during early childhood. As he once did as a baby and child, he experiences again the feelings of helpless dependence, all the futile longing for love, anger, rage and urge for revenge on the failing parents but now with the possibility of processing these contents that have shaped his persona.

The term countertransference refers to the analyst's projection onto their patient. This poses a potential problem for the analyst if it remains unrecognized. When recognized and understood, countertransference can also be an important source of information about what is going on in the analytic process.

From the sum of what is shown and communicated, the analyst deduces unconscious conflicts with imposed traumas that are causing the patient's symptoms, his persona and character problems, and works out a diagnosis. This explanation of the origin of loss of mental health and the analytical processes as a whole confronts the patients ego with the pathological defense mechanisms, makes him aware of them as well as the instinctive contents of the id that have been repressed by them, and thus helps him to better understand himself and the world in which he lives and was raised – according to Freud, the indispensable prerequisite for any consciously sought change in behavior that has therapeutically beneficial effects on interpersonal relationships.

Freud initially explored hypnosis as a therapeutic approach during his pre-psychoanalytic research but ultimately abandoned this in favor of free association.

=== Metapsychology ===
Though distinct from the common practice of psychoanalysis, its neurological branch, neuropsychoanalysis, has recently provided evidence that the brain stores experiences in specialized parts of its neural network and that the ego performs its highest focus of conscious thinking in the frontal lobe. Some regard Freud as the founder of this vein of research. However, early in the development of psychoanalysis, he turned away from it, arguing that consciousness is directly given and cannot be explained by insights into physiological connections. Essentially, in the study of the living soul, only two things were accessible: the brain with its nervous system extending over the entire organism and the acts of consciousness. In Freud's view, therefore, any number of phenomena can be integrated between "both endpoints of our knowledge", but this only contributes to the spatial "localization of the acts of consciousness" in the brain, not to their understanding.

=== Life and death drives ===
In Beyond the Pleasure Principle (1920), Freud draws on Plato's mythic description of spherical humans to illustrate his view of the essentially conservative nature of the instincts. In Plato's tale, these spherical beings—powerful, self-sufficient, and united—are split into separate individuals by Zeus as punishment for their assault on the gods. The act of separation creates a weaker type of human whose members nonetheless seek to restore the lost original united state, pursuing this goal in two ways: through the exchange of physical pleasure; and through collective creative thinking, as depicted by the group of artists and philosophers around Socrates in Plato's Symposium.

In his late formulation, Freud described the aim of Eros as "to establish ever greater unities and to preserve them," and that of the death drive as "to undo connections and so to destroy things," its final aim being "to lead what is living into an inorganic state."

=== The Question of Lay Analysis ===
Freud viewed his method as being open to everyone. In the Wednesday Psychological Society of early psychoanalysis, academics and non-academics worked together on an equal footing. To counter attempts to prohibit non-academics from becoming psychoanalysts (while reserving for themselves the right to apply the concept without serious knowledge), Freud sets out in his treatise The Question of Lay Analysis that the only condition required to practice psychoanalysis is the methodical examination of one's own inner situation, ideally with the assistance of an experienced psychoanalyst.

Freud's method is not limited to its classical therapeutic field of application but is also employed in research across many other areas – for example, in the interpretation of philosophical concepts and the analysis of the cultural phenomena.

== History ==
=== 1885–1899 ===
Psychoanalysis
- The words Die Psychoanalyse in Sigmund Freud's handwriting, 1938
- ICD-9-CM: 94.31
- MeSH: D011572

In 1885, Freud was given the opportunity to study at the Salpêtrière in Paris under the famous neurologist Jean-Martin Charcot. Charcot had specialized in the field of hysterical paralysis and established hypnosis as a research tool, the experimental application of which actually made it possible to eliminate symptoms of this kind. These findings reinforced the idea that physical symptoms could be caused by psychological factors.

From 1886-1896, Freud worked as a neurologist in a pediatric hospital (the Max-Kassowitz Institute in Vienna) where he treated children with neurological disorders. In his 1891 monograph called On Aphasia: A Critical Study, Freud critiqued oversimplified neuroanatomical localization and proposed a classification of aphasias according to associative disturbances (verbal, asymbolic, and agnostic aphasias). His distinction between "word-presentations" and "object presentations" was an important step toward the development of his psychoanalytic thinking.

Finding hypnosis insufficient as a methodology, Freud developed free association, which would become the central technique of psychoanalysis. His first attempt to explain neurotic symptoms in this way was presented in Studies on Hysteria (1895). Co-authored with Josef Breuer, this is generally seen as the birth of psychoanalysis. The work was based on their shared treatment of Bertha Pappenheim, referred to by the pseudonym "Anna O." Using the method of free association, Freud hypothesized that Pappenheim's hysteria was caused by distressing but unconscious experiences related to sexuality. Pappenheim herself dubbed the treatment the "talking cure".

Around the same time, Freud had started to develop a neurological hypothesis about mental phenomena such as memory, but soon abandoned this attempt and left it unpublished. Finding limitations with a strictly neurophysiological approach, Freud developed a new theory of the mind to capture the complex phenomena he was encountering. After some thought about a suitable term, Freud called his new instrument and field of research psychoanalysis, first introduced in his 1896 essay, "Heredity and the Aetiology of the Neuroses".

==== The seduction theory ====
In 1896, Freud also published his seduction theory, in which he claimed to have uncovered repressed memories of sexual abuse in each of his 18 early patients displaying hysterical symptoms. He concluded that hysteria must be caused by traumatic sexual abuse experienced in childhood. Later the same year, he became aware of an inconsistency: Freud was now working with a few additional patients, and most of them expressed their "emphatic disbelief" in respect of his childhood sexual abuse thesis, explaining that they "had no feeling of remembering the infantile sexual scenes" he suggested. This contradiction and other findings in the course of further research forced him to doubt the seduction theory. Initially, he expressed his suspicion of having made a mistake in private to his friend and colleague Wilhelm Fliess in 1897, but it took several years before he publicly revoked his thesis. While Freud maintained that sexual abuse had indeed occurred in some patients with hysterical symptoms, he hypothesized that his patients' accounts resulted at least in part from their sexual fantasies.

==== Repression, fantasy, and infantile sexuality ====
In the mid-1890s, he was still upholding the seduction hypothesis. After abandoning this theory as a general explanation, he argued that some patients' accounts could also involve fantasies. In this later interpretation, such fantasies could point not only to memories of external events, but also to unconscious memories or traces of infantile autoerotic activity, while at the same time disguising these activities because they had become associated with shame, prohibition, or guilt. The point for Freud was not so much the secrecy in the ordinary social sense, but the realization that children have sexual impulses before puberty and that mental processes can keep unacceptable wishes, memories, or fantasies from consciousness. These ideas contributed to his later theory of infantile sexuality and to the eventual development of the theory of the Oedipus complex.

==== The meaning of dreams ====
In 1899, Freud's work had progressed far enough that he was able to publish The Interpretation of Dreams. This, for him, was the most important of his writings. It put forth the argument that dreams contain symbolic meanings that can be uncovered with the help of the dreamer's free associations. Freud distinguished primary process, taking place predominantly in the unconscious, and secondary process of predominantly conscious thoughts.

The iceberg metaphor. It is often used to illustrate the spatial relationship between Freud's first model and the new concepts (id, ego, superego).

Freud summarized this view in his first model of the mind. Known as the topological model, it divides the mind into three systems: the unconscious, the preconscious, and the conscious. Sexual needs belong to the unconscious and are forced to remain there if the contents of the conscious mind ward them off. This is the case in societies that generally consider all extra- and premarital sexual activity to be a 'sin', passing this value on to the next generation through concrete or threatened punishments. Moral education creates fears of punitive violence or the deprivation of love in the child's mind. Preconscious fears influence consciousness in the sense of the imprinted rules of behavior. (Freud's second model of the mind, or structural model, introduces a separate distinction. Function replaced topology as the decisive factor. This new model did not replace the first one, but rather integrated it.)

The Interpretation of Dreams includes Freud’s first extended formulation of what later came to be called the Oedipus complex. In Freud’s account, the little boy admires his father and wishes to become like him, but also comes into conflict with him over the mother’s attention and love. The boy’s attachment to the mother is accompanied by rivalrous feelings toward the father, while his dependence on both parents’ love prevents these feelings from being acted upon directly. Such wishes and conflicts are therefore repressed into the unconscious, where they may persist in disguised form. Freud writes, “Like Oedipus, we live in ignorance of these wishes repugnant to morality, which have been forced upon us by Nature, and after their revelation we may all of us well seek to close our eyes to the scenes of our childhood”. In "The Dissolution of the Oedipus Complex," Freud linked the collapse of the boy’s Oedipus complex to castration anxiety. Freud wrote that, in accordance with constitutional bisexuality, the boy has a “double orientation, active and passive,” and thus also experiences loving feelings toward the father and rivalrous feelings with the mother.

Freud did not regard the female Oedipus complex as a simple inversion of the male one. In his later writings, especially “The Dissolution of the Oedipus Complex” and “Some Psychical Consequences of the Anatomical Distinction Between the Sexes,” he argued that the castration complex has a different function in girls than in boys: for the boy it brings the Oedipus complex to an end, whereas for the girl it helps bring the Oedipus complex into being. In Freud’s account, the girl’s recognition of anatomical difference weakens her attachment to the mother, whom she holds responsible for her lack of a penis, and contributes to a turn toward the father as love object. The wish for a penis is then said to be displaced, in later development, into the wish for a child. Freud further developed this account in his later writings on female sexuality, where he emphasized the importance of the girl’s earlier attachment to the mother before the turn toward the father. Freud rejected the idea that female development could be understood by merely reversing the roles assigned to boys. Although Carl Jung proposed the term “Electra complex” for a supposed female equivalent of the Oedipus complex, Freud rejected the term on the grounds that it falsely implied a direct symmetry between male and female development. Later psychoanalytic writers have continued to dispute how Freud’s account of the female Oedipus complex should be understood.

==== Critics of the abuse thesis and psychoanalysis in general ====
In the later part of the 20th century, several Freud researchers questioned the author's report that his very first patients had informed him of childhood sexual abuse. Some of the researchers argued that Freud had imposed his preconceived view on his patients, while others raised the suspicion of conscious forgery.

These are two different arguments. The latter tries to prove that Freud deliberately lied in order to make the allegedly unfounded psychoanalysis appear as a legitimate science; the former assumes an unknowingly committed act (countertransference). Freud, aware of his retraction of the abuse thesis, replied at various places in his work in the same way to both types of argument: that natural science is a process based on trial and error, in which it is impossible to have precisely defined concepts from the outset. "Indeed, even physics would have missed out on its entire development if it had been forced to wait until its concepts of matter, energy, gravity and others reached the desirable clarity and precision."

The psychologist Frank Sulloway points out in his book Freud, Biologist of the Mind: Beyond the Psychoanalytic Legend that the theories and hypotheses of psychoanalysis are anchored in the findings of contemporary biology. He mentions the profound influence of Charles Darwin's theory of evolution on Freud and quotes this sense from the writings of Haeckel, Wilhelm Fliess, Krafft-Ebing and Havelock Ellis.

Furthermore, attempts were made to label psychoanalysis as pseudoscience, since, according to Karl Popper, its central assumption of three interlinked metapsychological functions (instincts, consciousness, and memory) cannot be refuted. This type of unfalsifiability is especially directed against the explanation of acts of consciousness. Freud himself, however, never claimed that they are scientifically explainable by bodily conditions. Instead, he connected these "two end points of our knowledge" to the classical mind–body problem.

=== 1900–1940s ===
In 1905, Freud published Three Essays on the Theory of Sexuality in which he laid out his discovery of the psychosexual phases, which categorized early childhood development into five stages depending on what sexual affinity a child possessed at the stage:

- Oral (ages 0–2);
- Anal (2–4);
- Phallic-Oedipal or first genital (3–6);
- Latency (6–puberty); and
- Mature genital (puberty onward).

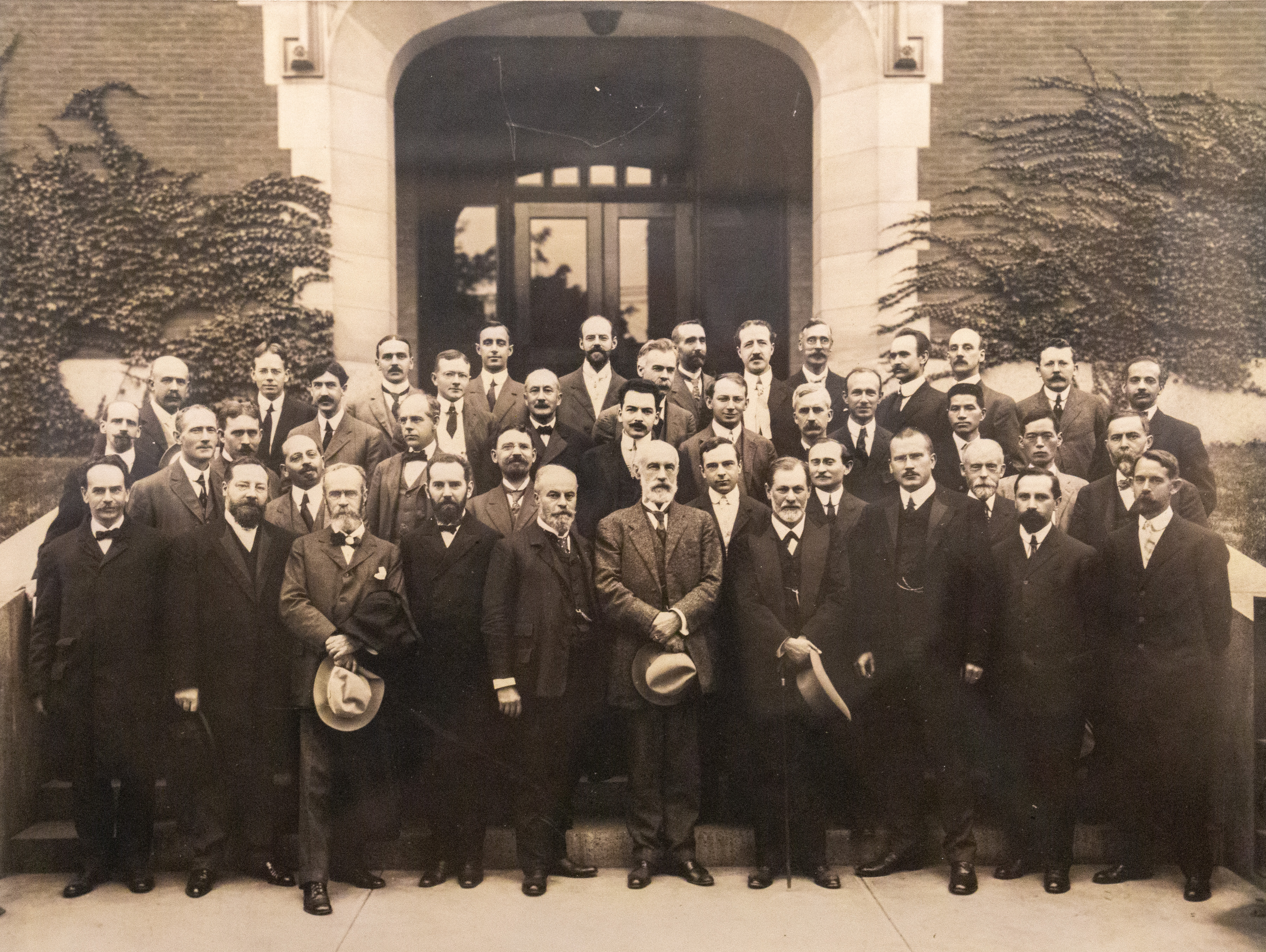
Group photograph of participants in the Psychology, Pedagogy, and School Hygiene Conference at Clark University in Worcester, Massachusetts with Freud present, 6 September 1909.

His early formulation included the idea that, because of societal restrictions, sexual wishes were repressed into an unconscious state, and that the energy of these unconscious wishes could result in anxiety or physical symptoms. Early treatment techniques, including hypnotism and abreaction, were designed to make the unconscious conscious in order to relieve the pressure and resulting symptoms. Freud would later abandon this approach in favor of free association.

In On Narcissism (1914), Freud turned his attention to the titular subject of narcissism. Freud characterized the difference between energy directed at the self versus energy directed at others using a system known as cathexis. By 1917, in "Mourning and Melancholia", he suggested that certain depressions were caused by turning guilt-ridden anger on the self. In 1919, through "A Child is Being Beaten", he began to address the problems of self-destructive behavior and sexual masochism. Based on his experience with depressed and self-destructive patients, and pondering the carnage of World War I, Freud became dissatisfied with considering only oral and sexual motivations for behavior. By 1920, Freud addressed the power of identification (with the leader and with other members) in groups as a motivation for behavior in Group Psychology and the Analysis of the Ego. In that same year, Freud suggested his dual drive theory of sexuality and aggression in Beyond the Pleasure Principle, to try to begin to explain human destructiveness. It was also the first introduction of his "structural theory" consisting of three new concepts id, ego, and superego.

Three years later, in 1923, he summarized the ideas of id, ego, and superego in The Ego and the Id. In the book, he revised the whole theory of mental functioning, now considering that repression was only one of many defense mechanisms, and that it occurred to reduce anxiety. Hence, Freud characterized repression as both a cause and a result of anxiety. In 1926, in "Inhibitions, Symptoms and Anxiety", Freud described how intrapsychic conflict between the drives and the superego caused anxiety, and how that anxiety could lead to the inhibition of mental functions such as cognition and speech. In 1924, Otto Rank published The Trauma of Birth, which analysed culture and philosophy in relation to separation anxiety which occurred before the development of an Oedipal complex. Freud's theories, however, characterized no such phase. According to Freud, the Oedipus complex was at the centre of neurosis, and was the foundational source of all art, myth, religion, philosophy, therapy—indeed of all human culture and civilization. It was the first time that anyone in Freud's inner circle had characterized something other than the Oedipus complex as contributing to intrapsychic development, a notion that was rejected by Freud and his followers at the time.

By 1936 the "Principle of Multiple Function" was clarified by Robert Waelder. He widened the formulation that psychological symptoms were caused by and relieved conflict simultaneously. Moreover, symptoms (such as phobias and compulsions) each represented elements of some drive wish (sexual and/or aggressive), superego, anxiety, reality, and defenses. Also in 1936, Anna Freud, Sigmund's daughter, published her seminal book The Ego and the Mechanisms of Defense outlining numerous ways the mind could shut upsetting things out of consciousness.

=== 1940s–present ===
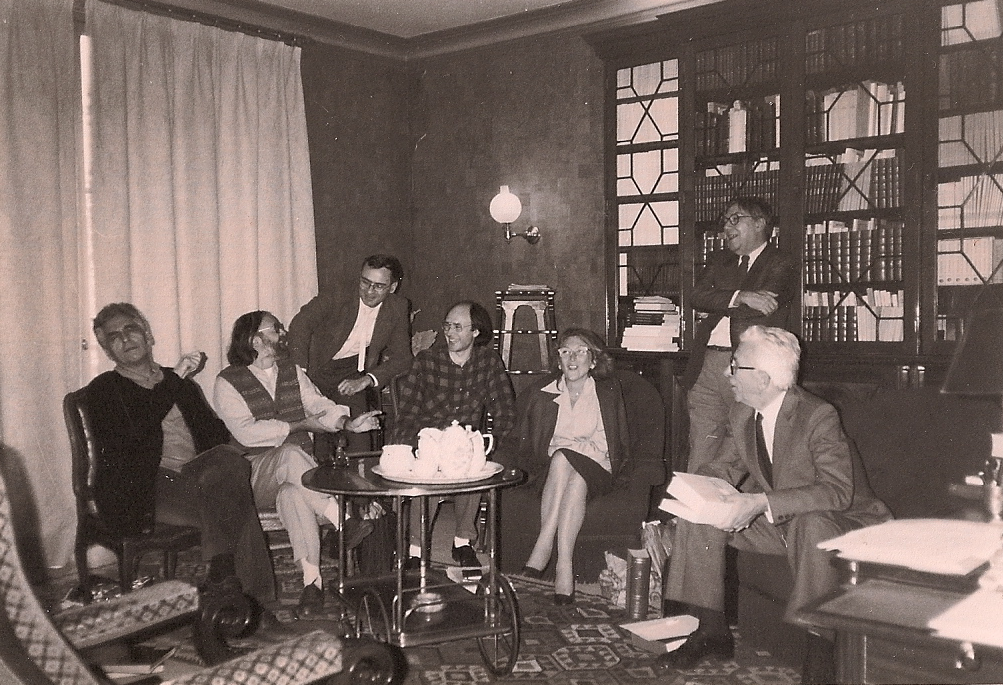
Group of Psychoanalysts, André Bourguignon, Pierre Cotet, François Robert, Alain Rauzy, and Janine Altounian in France

Due to Hitler's expansion and the Anschluss, the Freud family and many colleagues of Freud fled to London. Freud died shortly after on September 23, 1939. In the United States, following the death of Freud, a new group of psychoanalysts began to explore the function of the ego. Led by Heinz Hartmann, the group built upon understandings of the synthetic function of the ego as a mediator in psychic functioning, distinguishing this from autonomous ego functions (e.g., memory and intellect). These "ego psychologists" of the 1950s focused analytic work on attending to the defenses (mediated by the ego) before exploring the deeper roots of the unconscious conflicts.

In addition, there was growing interest in child psychoanalysis. Psychoanalysis has been used as a research tool in childhood development, (Note: cf. The Psychoanalytic Study of the Child, academic journal) and is still used to treat certain mental disturbances. In the 1960s, Freud's early thoughts on the childhood development of female sexuality were challenged; this challenge led to the development of a variety of understandings of female sexual development, many of which modified the timing and normality of several of Freud's theories. Several researchers followed Karen Horney's studies of societal pressures that influence the development of women.

In the first decade of the 21st century, there were approximately 35 training institutes for psychoanalysis in the United States accredited by the American Psychoanalytic Association (APsA), which is a component organization of the International Psychoanalytical Association (IPA), and there are over 3000 graduated psychoanalysts practicing in the United States. The IPA accredits psychoanalytic training centers through such "component organizations" throughout the rest of the world, including countries such as Serbia, France, Germany, Austria, Italy, Switzerland, and many others, as well as about six institutes directly in the United States.

=== Psychoanalysis as a movement ===
Freud founded the Wednesday Psychological Society (later called the Wednesday Psychoanalytic Society) in 1902, which Edward Shorter argues was the beginning of psychoanalysis as a movement. This society became the Vienna Psychoanalytic Society in 1908 in the same year as the first international congress of psychoanalysis held in Salzburg, Austria. Alfred Adler was one of the most active members in this society in its early years.

The second congress of psychoanalysis took place in Nuremberg, Germany in 1910. At this congress, Ferenczi called for the creation of an International Psychoanalytic Association with Jung as president for life. A third congress was held in Weimar in 1911. The London Psychoanalytical Society was founded in 1913 by Ernest Jones.

=== Developments of alternative forms of psychotherapy ===
==== Cognitive behavioral therapy (CBT) ====
In the 1950s, psychoanalysis was the main modality of psychotherapy. Behavioral models of psychotherapy started to assume a more central role in psychotherapy in the 1960s. (Note: "By the 1960s it would assume a more central place in the psychotherapy arena") Aaron T. Beck, a psychiatrist trained in a psychoanalytic tradition, set out to test the psychoanalytic models of depression empirically and found that conscious ruminations of loss and personal failing were correlated with depression. He suggested that distorted and biased beliefs were a causal factor of depression, publishing an influential paper in 1967 after a decade of research using the construct of schemas to explain the depression. Beck developed this empirically supported hypothesis for the cause of depression into a talking therapy called cognitive behavioral therapy (CBT) in the early 1970s.

==== Attachment theory ====
Attachment theory was developed theoretically by John Bowlby and formalized empirically by Mary Ainsworth. Bowlby was trained psychoanalytically but was concerned about some properties of psychoanalysis; he was troubled by the dogmatism of psychoanalysis at the time, its arcane terminology, the lack of attention to environment in child behavior, and the concepts derived from talking therapy to child behavior. In response, he developed an alternative conceptualization of child behavior based on principles on ethology. Bowlby's theory of attachment rejects Freud's model of psychosexual development based on the Oedipal model. For his work, Bowlby was shunned from psychoanalytical circles who did not accept his theories. Nonetheless, his conceptualization was adopted widely by mother-infant research in the 1970s.

== Theories ==
The predominant psychoanalytic theories can be organized into several theoretical schools. Although these perspectives differ, most of them emphasize the influence of unconscious elements on the conscious mind. There has also been considerable work done on consolidating elements of conflicting theories.

There are some persistent conflicts among psychoanalysts regarding specific causes of certain syndromes, and some disputes regarding the ideal treatment techniques. In the 21st century, psychoanalytic ideas have found influence in fields such as childcare, education, literary criticism, cultural studies, mental health, and particularly psychotherapy. Though most mainstream psychoanalysts subscribe to modern strains of psychoanalytical thought, there are groups that follow the precepts of a single psychoanalyst and their school of thought. Psychoanalytic ideas also play roles in some types of literary analysis, such as archetypal literary criticism.

=== Topographic theory ===
Topographic theory was named and first described by Sigmund Freud in The Interpretation of Dreams (1899). The theory hypothesizes that the mental apparatus can be divided into the systems Conscious, Preconscious, and Unconscious. These systems are not anatomical structures of the brain but, rather, mental processes. Although Freud retained this theory throughout his life, he largely replaced it with the structural theory.

=== Structural theory ===
Structural theory divides the psyche into the id, the ego, and the super-ego. The id is present at birth as the repository of basic instincts, which Freud called "Triebe" ("drives"). Unorganized and unconscious, it operates merely on the 'pleasure principle', without realism or foresight. The ego develops slowly and gradually, being concerned with mediating between the urging of the id and the realities of the external world; it thus operates on the 'reality principle'. The super-ego is held to be the part of the ego in which self-observation, self-criticism and other reflective and judgmental faculties develop. The ego and the superego are both partly conscious and partly unconscious.

=== Neuropsychoanalysis ===
In the late 20th century, neuropsychoanalysis was introduced. The aim of this new field was to bridge the gap between psychoanalytic concepts and neuroscientific findings. Solms theorizes that for every cognition-based action, there is a neurological reason behind it. According to Daniela Mosri, neuropsychoanalysis was coined by Solms and is a continuation of the original model proposed by Freud in 1895. Neuropsychoanalysis is an interdisciplinary approach that focuses on how neurobiological mechanisms influence the psychological aspects of the human mind with emphasis on repression, the dynamics of dreams, therapeutic relationships. Neuroimaging is one of the methods used to empirically validate psychoanalytic concepts.

=== Ego psychology ===
Ego psychology was initially suggested by Freud in Inhibitions, Symptoms and Anxiety (1926), while major steps forward would be made through Anna Freud's work on defense mechanisms, first published in her book The Ego and the Mechanisms of Defence (1936).

The theory was refined by Hartmann, Loewenstein, and Kris in a series of papers and books from 1939 through the late 1960s. Leo Bellak was a later contributor. This series of constructs, paralleling some of the later developments of cognitive theory, includes the notions of autonomous ego functions: mental functions not dependent, at least in origin, on intrapsychic conflict. Such functions include: sensory perception, motor control, symbolic thought, logical thought, speech, abstraction, integration (synthesis), orientation, concentration, judgment about danger, reality testing, adaptive ability, executive decision-making, hygiene, and self-preservation. Freud noted that inhibition is one method that the mind may utilize to interfere with any of these functions in order to avoid painful emotions. Hartmann (1950s) pointed out that there may be delays or deficits in such functions.

Frosch (1964) described differences in those people who demonstrated impairment in their relationship to reality, but who seemed able to test it.

According to ego psychology, ego strengths, later described by Otto F. Kernberg (1975), include the capacities to control oral, sexual, and destructive impulses; to tolerate painful affects without falling apart; and to prevent the eruption into consciousness of bizarre symbolic fantasy. Synthetic functions, in contrast to autonomous functions, arise from the development of the ego and serve the purpose of managing conflict processes. Defenses are synthetic functions that protect the conscious mind from awareness of forbidden impulses and thoughts. One purpose of ego psychology has been to emphasize that some mental functions can be considered to be basic, rather than derivatives of wishes, affects, or defenses. However, autonomous ego functions can be secondarily affected because of unconscious conflict. For example, a patient may have an hysterical amnesia (memory being an autonomous function) because of intrapsychic conflict (wishing not to remember because it is too painful).

Taken together, the above theories present a group of metapsychological assumptions. Therefore, the inclusive group of the different classical theories provides a cross-sectional view of human mental processes. There are six "points of view", five described by Freud and a sixth added by Hartmann. Unconscious processes can therefore be evaluated from each of these six points of view:

1. Topographic
2. Dynamic (the theory of conflict)
3. Economic (the theory of energy flow)
4. Structural
5. Genetic (i.e., propositions concerning the origin and development of psychological functions)
6. Adaptational (i.e., psychological phenomena as they relate to the external world)

==== Modern conflict theory ====
Modern conflict theory, a variation of ego psychology, is a revised version of structural theory, most notably different by altering concepts related to where repressed thoughts were stored. Modern conflict theory addresses emotional symptoms and character traits as complex solutions to mental conflict. It dispenses with the concepts of a fixed id, ego, and superego, and instead posits conscious and unconscious conflict among wishes (dependent, controlling, sexual, and aggressive), guilt and shame, emotions (especially anxiety and depressive affect), and defensive operations that shut off from consciousness some aspect of the others. Moreover, healthy functioning (adaptive) is also determined, to a great extent, by resolutions of conflict.

A major objective of modern conflict-theory psychoanalysis is to change the balance of conflict in a patient by making aspects of the less adaptive solutions (also called "compromise formations") conscious so that they can be rethought, and more adaptive solutions found. Current theoreticians who follow the work of Charles Brenner, especially The Mind in Conflict (1982), include Sandor Abend, Jacob Arlow, and Jerome Blackman.

=== Object relations theory ===
Object relations theory attempts to explain human relationships through a study of how mental representations of the self and others are organized. The clinical symptoms that suggest object relations problems (typically developmental delays throughout life) include disturbances in an individual's capacity to feel: warmth, empathy, trust, a sense of security, identity stability, consistent emotional closeness, and stability in relationships with significant others.

Klein discusses the concept of introjection, creating a mental representation of external objects; and projection, applying this mental representation to reality. Wilfred Bion introduced the concept of containment of projections in the mother-child relationship where a mother receives an infant's projections, modifies them, and returns them to the child.

Concepts regarding internal representation (also called 'introspect', 'self and object representation', or 'internalization of self and other'), although often attributed to Melanie Klein, were actually first mentioned by Sigmund Freud in his early concepts of drive theory (Three Essays on the Theory of Sexuality, 1905). Freud's 1917 paper "Mourning and Melancholia", for example, hypothesized that unresolved grief was caused by the survivor's internalized image of the deceased becoming fused with that of the survivor, and then the survivor shifting unacceptable anger toward the deceased onto the now complex self-image.

Melanie Klein's hypotheses regarding internalization during the first year of life, leading to paranoid and depressive positions, were later challenged by René Spitz (e.g., The First Year of Life, 1965), who divided the first year of life into a coenesthetic phase of the first six months, and then a diacritic phase for the second six months. Mahler, Fine, and Bergman (1975) describe distinct phases and subphases of child development leading to "separation-individuation" during the first three years of life, stressing the importance of constancy of parental figures in the face of the child's destructive aggression, internalizations, stability of affect management, and ability to develop healthy autonomy.

During adolescence, Erik Erikson (1950–1960s) described the 'identity crisis', that involves identity-diffusion anxiety. In order for an adult to be able to experience warmth, empathy, trust, holding environment, identity, closeness, and stability in relationships, the teenager must resolve the problems with identity and redevelop self and object constancy.

=== Relational psychoanalysis ===
Relational psychoanalysis combines interpersonal psychoanalysis with object-relations theory and with inter-subjective theory as critical for mental health. It was introduced by Stephen Mitchell. Relational psychoanalysis stresses how the individual's personality is shaped by both real and imagined relationships with others, and how these relationship patterns are re-enacted in the interactions between analyst and patient. Relational psychoanalysts have propounded their view of the necessity of helping certain detached, isolated patients develop the capacity for "mentalization" associated with thinking about relationships and themselves.

=== Self psychology ===
Self psychology emphasizes the development of a stable and integrated sense of self through empathic contacts with other humans, primary significant others conceived of as 'selfobjects'. Selfobjects meet the developing self's needs for mirroring, idealization, and twinship, and thereby strengthen the developing self. The process of treatment proceeds through "transmuting internalization," in which the patient gradually internalizes the selfobject functions provided by the therapist.

Self psychology was proposed originally by Heinz Kohut, and has been further developed by Arnold Goldberg, Frank Lachmann, Paul and Anna Ornstein, Marian Tolpin, and others.

=== Lacanian psychoanalysis ===
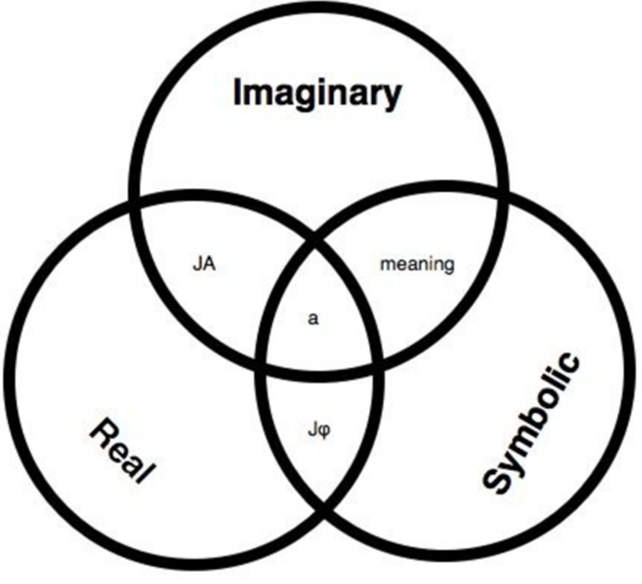
Diagram showing Lacanian psychoanalysis, with "the Real," "the Imaginary" and "the Symbolic"

Lacanian psychoanalysis, which integrates psychoanalysis with structural linguistics and Hegelian philosophy, is especially popular in France and parts of Latin America. Lacanian psychoanalysis is a departure from the traditional British and American psychoanalysis. Jacques Lacan frequently used the phrase "retourner à Freud" ("return to Freud") in his seminars and writings, as he claimed that his theories were an extension of Freud's own, contrary to those of Anna Freud, Ego Psychology, object relations and "self" theories and also claimed the necessity of reading Freud's complete works, not only a part of them. Lacan's concepts concern the "mirror stage", the "Real", the "Imaginary", and the "Symbolic", and the claim that "the unconscious is structured as a language."

Though a major influence on psychoanalysis in France and parts of Latin America, Lacan and his ideas have taken longer to be translated into English, and he has thus had a lesser impact on psychoanalysis and psychotherapy in the English-speaking world. In the United Kingdom and the United States, his ideas are most widely used to analyze texts in literary theory. Due to his increasingly controversial innovations to psychoanalytic technique, such as abruptly ending the session and disregarding countertransference, Lacan was expelled from the IPA, thus leading him to create his own school in order to maintain an institutional structure for the many candidates who desired to continue their analysis with him.

=== Adaptive paradigm ===
The adaptive paradigm of psychotherapy develops out of the work of Robert Langs. The adaptive paradigm interprets psychic conflict primarily in terms of conscious and unconscious adaptation to reality. Langs' recent work in some measure returns to the earlier Freud, in that Langs prefers a modified version of the topographic model of the mind (conscious, preconscious, and unconscious) over the structural model (id, ego, and super-ego), including the former's emphasis on trauma (though Langs looks to death-related traumas rather than sexual traumas). At the same time, Langs' model of the mind differs from Freud's in that it understands the mind in terms of evolutionary biological principles.

== Psychopathology (mental disturbances) ==
=== Childhood origins ===
Freudian theories hold that adult problems can be traced to unresolved conflicts from certain phases of childhood and adolescence, caused by fantasy, stemming from their own drives. Freud, based on the data gathered from his patients early in his career, suspected that neurotic disturbances occurred when children were sexually abused in childhood (i.e., seduction theory). Later, Freud came to believe that, although child abuse occurs, neurotic symptoms were not always caused only by this. He believed that neurotic people often had unconscious conflicts that involved incestuous fantasies deriving from different stages of development. He found the stage from about three to six years of age (preschool years, today called the "first genital stage") to be filled with fantasies of having romantic relationships with both parents. Arguments were quickly generated in early 20th-century Vienna about whether adult seduction of children, i.e. child sexual abuse, was the basis of neurotic illness. There still is no complete agreement, although nowadays professionals recognize the negative effects of child sexual abuse on mental health.

The theory on origins of pathologically dysfunctional relationships was further developed by the specialist in psychiatry Jürg Willi (* 16 March 1934 in Zürich; † 8 April 2019) into the Collusion (psychology) concept. The concept takes the observations of Sigmund Freud about the narcissistic, the oral, the anal, and the phallic phases and translates them into a two-couples-relationship model, with respect to dysfunctions in the relationship resulting from childhood trauma.

==== Oedipal conflicts ====
Many psychoanalysts who work with children have studied the actual effects of child abuse, which include ego and object relations deficits and severe neurotic conflicts. Much research has been done on these types of trauma in childhood and their sequelae in adulthood. In studying the childhood factors that start neurotic symptom development, Freud found a constellation of factors that, for literary reasons, he termed the Oedipus complex, based on the play by Sophocles, Oedipus Rex, in which the protagonist unwittingly kills his father and marries his mother.

The shorthand term, oedipal—later explicated by Joseph J. Sandler in "On the Concept Superego" (1960) and modified by Charles Brenner in The Mind in Conflict (1982)—refers to the powerful attachments that children make to their parents in the preschool years. These attachments involve fantasies of sexual relationships with either (or both) parent, and, therefore, competitive fantasies toward the other parent. Humberto Nagera (1975) has been particularly helpful in clarifying many of the complexities of the child through these years.

"Positive" and "negative" oedipal conflicts have been attached to the heterosexual and homosexual constellations, respectively. Both seem to occur in the development of most children. Eventually, the developing child's concessions to reality (that they will neither marry one parent nor eliminate the other) lead to identifications with parental values. These identifications generally create a new set of mental operations regarding values and guilt, subsumed under the term superego. Besides superego development, children "resolve" their preschool oedipal conflicts through channeling wishes into something their parents approve of ("sublimation") and the development, during the school-age years ("latency") of age-appropriate obsessive-compulsive defensive maneuvers (rules, repetitive games).

== Treatment ==
Using the various analytic and psychological techniques to assess mental problems, some believe that there are particular constellations of problems that are especially suited for analytic treatment whereas other problems might respond better to medicines and other interpersonal interventions. To be treated with psychoanalysis, whatever the presenting problem, the person requesting help must demonstrate a desire to start an analysis. The person wishing to start an analysis must have some capacity for speech and communication. As well, they need to be able to have or develop trust and insight within the psychoanalytic session. Potential patients may undergo a preliminary stage of treatment to assess their amenability to psychoanalysis at that time, and also to enable the analyst to form a working psychological model, which the analyst will use in the course of treatment. Psychoanalysts mainly work with neurosis and hysteria in particular; however, adapted forms of psychoanalysis are used in working with other forms of mental disorder. There are numerous modifications in technique under the heading of psychoanalysis to address different clinical needs.

The most common problems treatable with psychoanalysis include: phobias, conversions, compulsions, obsessions, anxiety attacks, depressions, sexual dysfunctions, a wide variety of relationship problems (such as dating and marital strife), and a wide variety of character problems (for example, painful shyness, meanness, obnoxiousness, workaholism, hyperseductiveness, hyperemotionality, hyperfastidiousness).

Analytical organizations such as the IPA, APsA and the European Federation for Psychoanalytic Psychotherapy have established procedures and models for the indication and practice of psychoanalytical therapy for trainees in analysis. The match between the analyst and the patient can be another relevant factor for psychoanalytic treatment. The analyst decides whether the patient is suitable for psychoanalysis. This decision made by the analyst, besides being made on the usual indications and pathology, is also based to a certain degree on the "fit" between analyst and patient. A person's suitability for analysis at any particular time is based on their desire to know something about where their illness has come from. Someone who is not suitable for analysis expresses no desire to know more about the root causes of their illness.

An evaluation may include one or more other analysts' independent opinions and will include discussion of the patient's financial situation and insurance.

=== Techniques ===
The foundation of psychoanalysis is an interpretation of the patient's unconscious conflicts that are interfering with current-day functioning – conflicts that are causing painful symptoms such as phobias, anxiety, depression, and compulsions. Strachey (1936) stressed that figuring out ways the patient distorted perceptions about the analyst led to understanding of what may have been forgotten. (Note: also see Freud's paper "Repeating, Remembering, and Working Through") Unconscious hostile feelings toward the analyst could be found in symbolic, negative reactions to what Robert Langs later called the "frame" of the therapy—the setup that included times of the sessions, payment of fees, and the necessity of talking. The analyst can usually find various unconscious "resistances" to the flow of thoughts (or free association) when the patient deviates from the established frame.

When the patient reclines on a couch with the analyst out of view, the patient tends to remember more experiences, develop resistances and transference, and reorganize thoughts after the development of insight through the interpretive work of the analysis. Fantasy life can be understood through the examination of dreams and sexual fantasies. (Note: cf. Marcus, I. and J. Francis. 1975. Masturbation from Infancy to Senescence.) The analyst is interested in how the patient reacts to and avoids such fantasies. Memories of early life may represent distorted screen memories. (Note: see the child studies of Eleanor Galenson on "evocative memory")

==== Variations in technique ====
There is what is known among psychoanalysts as classical technique, although Freud, throughout his writings, deviated from this considerably, depending on the problems of any given patient.

Classical technique was summarized by Allan Compton as comprising:

- Instructions: telling the patient to try to say what's on their mind, including interferences;
- Exploration: asking questions; and
- Clarification: rephrasing and summarizing what the patient has been describing.

The analyst can also use confrontation to bring an aspect of functioning, usually a defense, to the patient's attention. The analyst then uses a variety of interpretation methods, such as:

- Dynamic interpretation: showing the interaction of unconscious wishes, anxieties, and defenses;
- Genetic interpretation: explaining how a past event is influencing the present;
- Resistance interpretation: showing the patient how they are avoiding something;
- Transference interpretation: showing the patient ways old conflicts arise in current relationships, including in the relationship with the analyst; or
- Dream interpretation: obtaining the patient's thoughts about their dreams and connecting this with their current difficulties.

Analysts can also use reconstruction to understand what may have happened in the past that created some current issue. These techniques are primarily based on conflict theory. As object relations theory evolved, supplemented by the work of John Bowlby and Mary Ainsworth, new techniques developed for patients who had more severe problems with basic trust (Erik Erikson, 1950) and a history of maternal deprivation (see the works of Augusta Alpert). These have sometimes been called interpersonal, intersubjective (cf. Robert Stolorow), relational, or corrective object relations techniques.

Ego psychological concepts of deficit in functioning led to refinements in supportive therapy. These techniques are particularly applicable to psychotic and near-psychotic (cf. Eric Marcus, "Psychosis and Near-psychosis") patients. These supportive therapy techniques include discussions of reality; encouragement to stay alive (including hospitalization); psychotropic medicines to relieve overwhelming depressive affect or overwhelming fantasies (hallucinations and delusions); and advice about the meanings of things (to counter failures of abstraction).

The notion of the "silent analyst" has been criticized. Actually, the analyst actively listens and intervenes to interpret resistances, defenses, and fantasies. Silence is not a technique of psychoanalysis (see also the studies and opinion papers of Owen Renik). "Analytic neutrality" is a concept that does not mean the analyst is silent. It refers to the analyst's position of not taking sides in the internal struggles of the patient. For example, if a patient feels guilty, the analyst might explore what is causing the feeling of guilt rather than attempting to reassure the patient not to feel guilty. The analyst might also explore the identifications with parents and others that led to the guilt.

Interpersonal–relational psychoanalysts emphasize the notion that it is impossible to be neutral. Sullivan introduced the term participant-observer to indicate that the analyst inevitably influences the interaction with the analysand, and suggested the detailed inquiry as an alternative to interpretation. The detailed inquiry involves noting where the analysand is leaving out important elements of an account and noting when the story is obfuscated, and asking careful questions to open up the dialogue.

=== Group therapy and play therapy ===
Although single-client sessions remain the norm, psychoanalytic theory has been used to develop other types of psychological treatment. Psychoanalytic group therapy was pioneered by Trigant Burrow, Joseph Pratt, Paul F. Schilder, Samuel R. Slavson, Harry Stack Sullivan, and Wolfe. Child-centered counseling for parents was instituted early in analytic history by Freud, and was later further developed by Irwin Marcus, Edith Schulhofer, and Gilbert Kliman. Psychoanalytically-based couples therapy has been promulgated and explicated by Fred Sander. Techniques and tools developed in the first decade of the 21st century have made psychoanalysis available to patients who were not treatable by earlier techniques. This meant that the analytic situation was modified so that it would be more suitable and more likely to be helpful for these patients. Eagle (2007) believes that psychoanalysis cannot be a self-contained discipline but instead must be open to influence from and integration with findings and theory from other disciplines.

Psychoanalytic constructs have been adapted for use with children with treatments such as play therapy, art therapy, and storytelling. Throughout her career, from the 1920s through the 1970s, Anna Freud adapted psychoanalysis for children through play. This is still used today for children, especially those who are preadolescent. (Note: see Leon Hoffman, New York Psychoanalytic Institute Center for Children) Using toys and games, children symbolically demonstrate their fears, fantasies, and defenses; although not identical, this technique, in children, is analogous to the aim of free association in adults. Psychoanalytic play therapy allows the child and analyst to understand the child's conflicts, e.g., defenses such as disobedience and withdrawal, that have been guarding against various difficult feelings. In art therapy, the counselor may have a child draw a portrait and then tell a story about the portrait. The counselor watches for the emergence of recurring themes.

=== Cultural variations ===
Psychoanalysis can be adapted to different cultures, as long as the therapist or counselor understands the client's culture. For example, Tori and Blimes found that defense mechanisms were valid in a normative sample of 2,624 Thais. The use of certain defense mechanisms was related to cultural values. For example, Thais value calmness and collectiveness (because of Buddhist beliefs), so they were low on regressive emotionality. Psychoanalysis also applies because Freud used techniques that allowed him to get the subjective perceptions of his patients. He took an objective approach by not facing his clients during his talk therapy sessions. He met with his patients wherever they were, such as when he used free association, where clients would say whatever came to mind without self-censorship. His treatments had little to no structure for most cultures, especially Asian cultures. Therefore, it is more likely that Freudian constructs will be used in structured therapy. In addition, Corey postulates that it will be necessary for a therapist to help clients develop a cultural identity as well as an ego identity.

=== Psychodynamic therapy ===
According to the NIH, psychodynamic therapy focuses on how an individual's present behavior is affected by past experiences and the unconscious processes. The main goal associated with psychodynamic therapy is internal reflection; for the patient to be able to understand more about their current behaviors after self-reflection and an analysis of contributing factors from their past with their therapist. In order for this method of treatment to be effective, there must be a strong foundation of trust between the patient and their therapist. According to Plakun et al., over "400 randomized controlled trials (RCTs) have demonstrated the effectiveness or efficacy of psychodynamic therapy (PDT) for treatment of individual and complex comorbid mental disorders".

=== Cost and length of treatment ===
The cost to the patient of psychoanalytic treatment ranges widely from place to place and between practitioners. Low-fee analysis is often available in a psychoanalytic training clinic and graduate schools. Otherwise, the fee set by each analyst varies with the analyst's training and experience. Since, in most locations in the United States, unlike in Ontario and Germany, classical analysis (which usually requires sessions three to five times per week) is not fully covered by health insurance, many analysts may negotiate their fees with patients whom they feel they can help, but who have financial difficulties. The modifications of analysis, which include psychodynamic therapy, brief therapies, and certain types of group therapy, (Note: cf. Slavson, S. R., A Textbook in Analytic Group Therapy) are carried out on a less frequent basis—usually once, twice, or three times a week – and usually the patient sits facing the therapist. As a result of defense mechanisms and the lack of ready access to the elements of the unconscious, psychoanalysis can be an expansive process that involves 2 to 5 sessions per week for several years. This type of therapy relies on the belief that reducing the symptoms will not actually help with the root causes or irrational drives. The analyst typically is a 'blank screen', disclosing little about themselves in order that the client can use the space in the relationship to work on their unconscious without interference from outside.

The psychoanalyst uses various methods to help the patient become more self-aware, develop insight, and uncover the meanings of symptoms. Firstly, the psychoanalyst attempts to develop a safe and confidential atmosphere where the patient can freely report feelings, thoughts, and fantasies. Analysands (as people in analysis are called) are asked to report whatever comes to mind without fear of reprisal. Freud called this the "fundamental rule". Analysands are asked to talk about their lives, including their early life, current life, and hopes and aspirations for the future. They are encouraged to report their fantasies, "flash thoughts", and dreams. In fact, Freud believed that dreams were, "the royal road to the unconscious"; he devoted an entire volume to the interpretation of dreams. Freud had his patients lie on a couch in a dimly lit room and would sit out of sight, usually directly behind them, so as to not influence the patient's thoughts by his gestures or expressions.

The psychoanalyst's task, in collaboration with the analysand, is to help deepen the analysand's understanding of unconscious factors that drive their behaviors. In the safe environment psychoanalysis offers, the analysand becomes attached to the analyst and begins to experience the same conflicts with the analyst that they experience with key figures in their life, such as parents, their boss, their significant other, etc. It is the psychoanalyst's role to point out these conflicts and to interpret them. The transferring of these internal conflicts onto the analyst is called "transference".

Many studies have also been done on briefer "dynamic" treatments; these are more expedient to measure and shed light on the therapeutic process to some extent. Brief Relational Therapy (BRT), Brief Psychodynamic Therapy (BPT), and Time-Limited Dynamic Therapy (TLDP) limit treatment to 20–40 sessions. On average, classical analysis may last 5.7 years. Longer analyses are indicated for those with more serious disturbances in object relations, more symptoms, and more ingrained character pathology.

== Training and research ==
Psychoanalysis continues to be practiced by psychiatrists, social workers, and other mental health professionals; however, its practice has declined. It has been largely replaced by the similar but broader psychodynamic psychotherapy in the mid-20th century. Psychoanalytic approaches continue to be listed by the UK National Health Service as possibly helpful for depression.

=== United States ===
Psychoanalytic training in the United States tends to vary according to the program, but it involves a personal psychoanalysis for the trainee, approximately 300 to 600 hours of class instruction, with a standard curriculum, over a two to five-year period.

Typically, this psychoanalysis must be conducted by a Supervising and Training Analyst. Most institutes (but not all) within the American Psychoanalytic Association require that Supervising and Training Analysts become certified by the American Board of Psychoanalysts. Certification entails a blind review in which the psychoanalyst's work is vetted by psychoanalysts outside of their local community. After earning certification, these psychoanalysts undergo another hurdle in which they are specially vetted by senior members of their own institute and held to the highest ethical and moral standards. Moreover, they are required to have extensive experience conducting psychoanalyses.

Candidates generally have an hour of supervision each week per psychoanalytic case. The required number of cases varies between institutes. Candidates often have two to four cases; both male and female cases are required. Supervision extends for at least a few years on one or more cases. During supervision, the trainee presents material from the psychoanalytic work that week. With the supervisor, the trainee then explores the patient's unconscious conflicts with examination of transference-countertransference constellations.

Many psychoanalytic training centers in the United States have been accredited by special committees of the APsA or the IPA. Because of theoretical differences, there are independent institutes, usually founded by psychologists, who until 1987 were not permitted access to psychoanalytic training institutes of the APsA. Currently, there are between 75 and 100 independent institutes in the United States. As well, other institutes are affiliated to other organizations such as the American Academy of Psychoanalysis and Dynamic Psychiatry and the National Association for the Advancement of Psychoanalysis. At most psychoanalytic institutes in the United States, qualifications for entry include a terminal degree in a mental health field, such as Ph.D., Psy.D., M.S.W., or M.D. A few institutes restrict applicants to those already holding an M.D. or Ph.D., and most institutes in Southern California confer a Ph.D. or Psy.D. in psychoanalysis upon graduation, which involves completion of the necessary requirements for the state boards that confer that doctoral degree. The first training institute in America to educate non-medical psychoanalysts was The National Psychological Association for Psychoanalysis (1978) in New York City. It was founded by the analyst Theodor Reik. The Contemporary Freudian (originally the New York Freudian Society), an offshoot of the National Psychological Association, has a branch in Washington, DC. It is a component society/institute or the IPA.

Some psychoanalytic training has been set up as a post-doctoral fellowship in university settings, such as at Duke University, Yale University, New York University, Adelphi University, and Columbia University. Other psychoanalytic institutes may not be directly associated with universities, but the faculty at those institutes usually hold contemporaneous faculty positions with psychology Ph.D. programs and/or with medical school psychiatry residency programs.

In recent decades, some graduate schools and psychoanalytic institutions have developed programs leading to doctoral degrees in psychoanalysis. Several institutions in the United States have offered such degrees, such as the Boston Graduate School of Psychoanalysis (which awards the Doctor of Psychoanalysis or Psya.D. degree) and the Center for Psychoanalytic Study in Chicago, Illinois, (which awarded the D.Psa. degree). In addition, a number of psychoanalytic training institutes in California historically awarded doctoral degrees (including Ph.D. and Psy.D. degrees), including the Institute of Contemporary Psychoanalysis, the Los Angeles Psychoanalytic Society and Institute, the New Center for Psychoanalysis, the Newport Psychoanalytic Institute, the Psychoanalytic Center of California, and Psychoanalytic Institute of Northern California, and the Southern California Psychoanalytic Institute and Society. Internationally, several universities award doctoral degrees in psychoanalysis and psychoanalytic studies, including University College London and the University of Essex.

The IPA is the world's primary accrediting and regulatory body for psychoanalysis. Their mission is to ensure the continued vigor and development of psychoanalysis for the benefit of psychoanalytic patients. It works in partnership with its 70 constituent organizations in 33 countries to support 11,500 members. In the US, there are 77 psychoanalytical organizations, institutes, and associations, which are spread across the states. APsA has 38 affiliated societies which have 10 or more active members who practice in a given geographical area. The aims of APsA and other psychoanalytical organizations are: to provide ongoing educational opportunities for its members, stimulate the development and research of psychoanalysis, provide training, and organize conferences. There are eight affiliated study groups in the United States. A study group is the first level of integration of a psychoanalytical body within the IPA, followed by a provisional society and finally a member society.

The Division of Psychoanalysis (39) of the American Psychological Association (APA) was established in the early 1980s by several psychologists. Until the establishment of the Division of Psychoanalysis, psychologists who had trained in independent institutes had no national organization. The Division of Psychoanalysis now has approximately 4,000 members and approximately 30 local chapters in the United States. The Division of Psychoanalysis holds two annual meetings or conferences and offers continuing education in theory, research and clinical technique, as do their affiliated local chapters. The European Psychoanalytical Federation (EPF) is the organization which consolidates all European psychoanalytic societies. This organization is affiliated with the IPA. In 2002, there were approximately 3,900 individual members in 22 countries, speaking 18 different languages. There are also 25 psychoanalytic societies.

The American Association of Psychoanalysis in Clinical Social Work (AAPCSW) was established by Crayton Rowe in 1980 as a division of the Federation of Clinical Societies of Social Work and became an independent entity in 1990. Until 2007, it was known as the National Membership Committee on Psychoanalysis. The organization was founded because although social workers represented the largest number of people who were training to be psychoanalysts, they were underrepresented as supervisors and teachers at the institutes they attended. AAPCSW now has over 1,000 members and has over 20 chapters. It holds a bi-annual national conference and numerous annual local conferences.

Experiences of psychoanalysts and psychoanalytic psychotherapists and research into infant and child development have led to new insights. Theories have been further developed, and the results of empirical research are now more integrated in psychoanalytic theory.

=== United Kingdom ===
The London Psychoanalytical Society was founded by Ernest Jones in 1913. After World War I with the expansion of psychoanalysis in the United Kingdom, the Society was reconstituted and named the British Psychoanalytical Society in 1919. Soon after, the Institute of Psychoanalysis was established to administer the Society's activities. These include: the training of psychoanalysts, the development of the theory and practice of psychoanalysis, the provision of treatment through The London Clinic of Psychoanalysis, and the publication of books in The New Library of Psychoanalysis and Psychoanalytic Ideas. The Institute of Psychoanalysis also publishes The International Journal of Psychoanalysis, maintains a library, furthers research, and holds public lectures. The society has a Code of Ethics and an Ethical Committee. The society, the institute, and the clinic are all located at Byron House in West London.

The Society is a constituent society of the International Psychoanalytical Association (IPA), a body with members on all five continents which safeguards professional and ethical practice. The Society is a member of the British Psychoanalytic Council (BPC); the BPC publishes a register of British psychoanalysts and psychoanalytical psychotherapists. All members of the British Psychoanalytic Council are required to undertake continuing professional development, CPD. Members of the Society teach and hold posts on other approved psychoanalytic courses, e.g., the British Psychotherapy Foundation, and in academic departments, e.g., University College London.

Members of the Society have included: Michael Balint, Wilfred Bion, John Bowlby, Ronald Fairbairn, Anna Freud, Harry Guntrip, Melanie Klein, Donald Meltzer, Joseph J. Sandler, Hanna Segal, J. D. Sutherland, and Donald Winnicott.

The Institute of Psychoanalysis is the foremost publisher of psychoanalytic literature. The 24-volume Standard Edition of the Complete Psychological Works of Sigmund Freud was conceived, translated, and produced under the direction of the British Psychoanalytical Society. The Society, in conjunction with Random House, will soon publish a new, revised and expanded Standard Edition. With the New Library of Psychoanalysis, the Institute continues to publish the books of leading theorists and practitioners. The International Journal of Psychoanalysis is published by the Institute of Psychoanalysis. For over 100 years, it has one of the largest circulations of any psychoanalytic journal.

=== Psychoanalytic psychotherapy ===
There are different forms of psychoanalysis and psychotherapy in which psychoanalytic thinking is applied. In addition to classical psychoanalysis, there is for example psychoanalytic psychotherapy, an approach that expands "the accessibility of psychoanalytic theory and clinical practices that had evolved over 100 plus years to a larger number of individuals." Other examples of well-known therapies that also use insights of psychoanalysis are mentalization-based treatment (MBT) and transference focused psychotherapy (TFP). There is also a continuing influence of psychoanalytic thinking in mental health care and psychiatric care.

=== Research ===
Over a hundred years of case reports and studies in the journal Modern Psychoanalysis, the Psychoanalytic Quarterly, the International Journal of Psychoanalysis, and the Journal of the American Psychoanalytic Association have analyzed the efficacy of analysis in cases of neurosis and character or personality problems. Psychoanalysis modified by object relations techniques has been shown to be effective in many cases of ingrained problems of intimacy and relationships (cf. writings of Otto Kernberg). Psychoanalytic treatment, in other situations, may run from about a year to many years, depending on the severity and complexity of the pathology.

Psychoanalytic theory has, from its inception, been the subject of criticism and controversy. Freud remarked on this early in his career, when other physicians in Vienna ostracized him for his findings that hysterical conversion symptoms were not limited to women. Challenges to analytic theory began with Otto Rank and Alfred Adler (turn of the 20th century), continued with behaviorists (e.g., Wolpe) into the 1940s and '50s, and have persisted (e.g., Miller). Criticisms come from those who object to the notion that there are mechanisms, thoughts or feelings in the mind that could be unconscious. Criticisms also have been leveled against the idea of "infantile sexuality" (the recognition that children between ages two and six imagine things about procreation). Criticisms of theory have led to variations in analytic theories, such as the work of Ronald Fairbairn, Michael Balint, and John Bowlby. In the past 30 years or so, the criticisms have centered on the issue of empirical verification; it is difficult to substantiate the efficacy of psychoanalytic treatments in a psychiatric context.

Psychoanalysis has been used as a research tool in childhood development (cf. the journal The Psychoanalytic Study of the Child) and has developed into a flexible, effective treatment for certain mental disturbances. In the 1960s, Freud's early (1905) thoughts on the childhood development of female sexuality were challenged; this challenge led to major research in the 1970s and 80s, and then to a reformulation of female sexual development that corrected some of Freud's concepts. Also see the various works of Eleanor Galenson, Nancy Chodorow, Karen Horney, Françoise Dolto, Melanie Klein, Selma Fraiberg, and others. Most recently, psychoanalytic researchers who have integrated attachment theory into their work, including Alicia Lieberman and Daniel Schechter, have explored the role of parental traumatization in the development of young children's mental representations of self and others.

== Effectiveness ==
The psychoanalytic profession has at times been resistant to researching efficacy due to multiple epistemic difficulties and the long term nature of treatment. Evaluations of effectiveness based on an interpretation of the therapist alone cannot be proven.

=== Research results ===
Numerous studies have shown that the efficacy of therapy is related to the quality of the therapeutic alliance.

An updated 2020 meta-analysis of long-term psychoanalytic psychotherapy (LTPP) for complex mental disorders found small but statistically significant benefits over other psychotherapies in most outcome domains, though results should be interpreted cautiously due to study heterogeneity and methodological limitations.

Meta-analyses in 2019 found psychoanalytic and psychodynamic therapy effective at improving psychosocial wellbeing as well as reducing suicidality and self-harm behavior in patients at a 6-month interval. There has also been evidence for psychoanalytic psychotherapy as an effective treatment for Attention Deficit Hyperactivity Disorder (ADHD) and Conduct Disorder when compared with behavioral management treatments with or without methylphenidate. Meta-analyses in 2012 and 2013 found support or evidence for the efficacy of psychoanalytic therapy. Other meta-analyses published in recent years showed psychoanalysis and psychodynamic therapy to be effective, with outcomes comparable to or greater than other kinds of psychotherapy or antidepressant medications, but these meta-analyses have been subject to various criticisms. In particular, the inclusion of pre-/post-studies (rather than randomized controlled trials) and the absence of adequate comparisons with control treatments pose a serious limitation in interpreting the results. A French 2004 report from INSERM concluded that psychoanalytic therapy is less effective than other psychotherapies (including cognitive behavioral therapy) for certain diseases.

In 2011, the American Psychological Association reviewed 103 RCT comparisons between psychodynamic treatment and a non-dynamic competitor, which had been published between 1974 and 2010, and among which 63 were deemed of adequate quality. Out of 39 comparisons with an active competitor, they found that 6 psychodynamic treatments were superior, 5 were inferior, and 28 showed no difference. In 24 comparison studies of psychodynamic psychotherapy with an "inactive" comparator, dynamic treatment was superior in 18. The study found these results promising but emphasized the necessity of further good-quality trials replicating positive results on specific disorders.

Meta-analyses of Short Term Psychodynamic Psychotherapy (STPP) have found effect sizes (Cohen's d) ranging from 0.34 to 0.71 compared to no treatment and were found to be slightly better than other therapies in follow-up. Other reviews have found an effect size of 0.78 to 0.91 for somatoform disorders compared to no treatment and 0.69 for treating depression. A 2012 Harvard Review of Psychiatry meta-analysis of Intensive Short-Term Dynamic Psychotherapy (ISTDP) found effect sizes ranging from 0.84 for interpersonal problems to 1.51 for depression. Overall, ISTDP had an effect size of 1.18 compared to no treatment.

A meta-analysis of Long Term Psychodynamic Psychotherapy (LTPP) in 2012 found an overall effect size of 0.33, which is modest. This study concluded the recovery rate following LTPP was equal to control treatments, including treatment as usual, and found the evidence for the effectiveness of LTPP to be limited and at best conflicting. Others have found effect sizes of 0.44–0.68.

According to a 2004 French review conducted by INSERM, psychoanalysis was presumed or proven effective at treating panic disorder, post-traumatic stress, and personality disorders, but did not find evidence of its effectiveness in treating schizophrenia, obsessive compulsive disorder, specific phobia, bulimia, and anorexia.

A 2001 systematic review of the medical literature by the Cochrane Collaboration concluded that no data exist demonstrating that psychodynamic psychotherapy is effective in treating schizophrenia and severe mental illness and cautioned that medication should always be used alongside any type of talk therapy in schizophrenia cases. A French review from 2004 found the same. The Schizophrenia Patient Outcomes Research Team advises against the use of psychodynamic therapy in cases of schizophrenia, arguing that more trials are necessary to verify its effectiveness.

== Criticism ==
Both Freud and psychoanalysis have been criticized in extreme terms. Exchanges between critics and defenders of psychoanalysis have often been so heated that they have come to be characterized as the Freud Wars. Linguist Noam Chomsky has criticized psychoanalysis for lacking a scientific basis. Evolutionary biologist Stephen Jay Gould considered psychoanalysis influenced by pseudoscientific theories such as recapitulation theory. Psychologists Hans Eysenck, John F. Kihlstrom, and others have also criticized the field as pseudoscience.

=== Debate over status as scientific ===
The theoretical foundations of psychoanalysis lie in the same philosophical currents that lead to interpretive phenomenology rather than in those that lead to scientific positivism, making the theory largely incompatible with positivist approaches to the study of the mind.

Early critics of psychoanalysis believed that its theories were based too little on quantitative and experimental research and too much on the clinical case study method. Philosopher Frank Cioffi cites false claims of a sound scientific verification of the theory and its elements as the strongest basis for classifying the work of Freud and his school as pseudoscience.

Karl Popper argued that psychoanalysis is a pseudoscience because its claims are not testable and cannot be refuted; that is, they are not falsifiable, and the theory is no more valid or scientific than astrology or Homer's stories.

In addition, Imre Lakatos wrote that "Freudians have been nonplussed by Popper's basic challenge concerning scientific honesty. Indeed, they have refused to specify experimental conditions under which they would give up their basic assumptions." The philosopher and physicist Mario Bunge argued that psychoanalysis is a pseudoscience because it violates the ontology and methodology inherent to science. According to Bunge, most psychoanalytic theories are either untestable or unsupported by evidence.

Cognitive scientists, in particular, have also weighed in. Martin Seligman, a prominent academic in positive psychology, wrote:

Thirty years ago, the cognitive revolution in psychology overthrew both Freud and the behaviorists, at least in academia.… The imperialistic Freudian view claims that emotion always drives thought, while the imperialistic cognitive view claims that thought always drives emotion. The evidence, however, is that each drives the other at times.

Adolf Grünbaum argues in Validation in the Clinical Theory of Psychoanalysis (1993) that psychoanalytic-based theories are falsifiable but that the causal claims of psychoanalysis are unsupported by the available clinical evidence.

Historian Henri Ellenberger, who researched the history of Freud, Jung, Adler, and Janet, while writing his book The Discovery of the Unconscious: The History and Evolution of Dynamic Psychiatry, argued that psychoanalysis was not scientific on the grounds of both its methodology and social structure, instead resembling a philosophical sect.

Psychiatrist E. Fuller Torrey, in Witchdoctors and Psychiatrists (1986), agreed that psychoanalytic theories have no more scientific basis than the theories of traditional native healers, "witchdoctors" or modern "cult" alternatives such as EST. Psychologist Alice Miller charged psychoanalysis with being similar to the poisonous pedagogies, which she described in her book For Your Own Good. She scrutinized and rejected the validity of Freud's drive theory, including the Oedipus complex, which, according to her and Jeffrey Masson, blames the child for the abusive sexual behavior of adults. Journalist Janet Malcolm, in her 1984 book In the Freud Archives, argued that Masson fundamentally misunderstood Freud's work. (Masson subsequently unsuccessfully sued The New Yorker and Malcolm for libel, alleging that Malcolm had fabricated quotations she attributed to him.) Psychologist Joel Kupfersmid investigated the validity of the Oedipus complex, examining its nature and origins. He concluded that there is little evidence to support the existence of the Oedipus complex.

=== Freud ===
Some have accused Freud of fabrication, most famously in the case of Anna O. Others have speculated that Anna O. suffered from medical illnesses rather than Freud's diagnosis of hysteria.

Henri Ellenberger and Frank Sulloway argue that Freud and his followers created an inaccurate legend of Freud to popularize psychoanalysis. Mikkel Borch-Jacobsen and Sonu Shamdasani argue that this legend has been adapted to different times and situations. Isabelle Stengers states that psychoanalytic circles have tried to stop historians from accessing documents about the life of Freud.

=== Critical perspectives ===
Contemporary philosophers Gilles Deleuze and Félix Guattari asserted that the institution of psychoanalysis has become a center of power and that its confessional techniques resemble those included and utilized within the Christian religion. Their most in-depth criticism of the power structure of psychoanalysis and its connivance with capitalism are found in Anti-Oedipus (1972) and A Thousand Plateaus (1980), the two volumes of their theoretical work Capitalism and Schizophrenia. In Anti-Oedipus, Deleuze and Guattari take the cases of Gérard Mendel, Bela Grunberger, and Janine Chasseguet-Smirgel, prominent members of the most respected psychoanalytical associations (including the IPA), to suggest that, traditionally, psychoanalysis had always enthusiastically enjoyed and embraced a police state throughout its history.

French psychoanalyst Jacques Lacan criticized the emphasis of some American and British psychoanalytical traditions on what he viewed as the suggestion of imaginary "causes" for symptoms and recommended the return to Freud.

Belgian psycholinguist and psychoanalyst Luce Irigaray also criticized psychoanalysis, employing Jacques Derrida's concept of phallogocentrism to describe the exclusion of women from both Freudian and Lacanian psychoanalytical theories.

=== Freudian theory ===
Many aspects of Freudian theory are indeed out of date, and they should be: Freud died in 1939, and he has been slow to undertake further revisions. His critics, however, are equally behind the times, attacking Freudian views of the 1920s as if they continue to have some currency in their original form. Psychodynamic theory and therapy have evolved considerably since 1939, when Freud's bearded countenance was last sighted in earnest. Contemporary psychoanalysts and psychodynamic therapists no longer write much about ids and egos, nor do they conceive of treatment for psychological disorders as an archaeological expedition in search of lost memories.

— Drew Westen, 1998

A survey of scientific research suggested that while personality traits corresponding to Freud's oral, anal, Oedipal, and genital phases can be observed, they do not necessarily manifest as stages in the development of children. These studies also have not confirmed that such adult traits result from childhood experiences. However, these stages should not be considered crucial to modern psychoanalysis. The power of the unconscious and the transference phenomenon is vital to contemporary psychoanalytic theory and practice.

The idea of the "unconscious" is contested because human behavior can be observed, while human mental activity has to be inferred. However, the unconscious is now a popular topic of study in the fields of experimental and social psychology (e.g., implicit attitude measures, fMRI, PET scans, and other indirect tests). The idea of the unconscious and the transference phenomenon have been widely researched and, it is claimed, validated in the fields of cognitive psychology and social psychology, though the majority of cognitive psychologists does not hold a Freudian interpretation of unconscious mental activity. Recent developments in neuroscience have resulted in one side arguing that it has provided a biological basis for unconscious emotional processing in line with psychoanalytic theory (i.e., neuropsychoanalysis), while the other side argues that such findings make psychoanalytic theory obsolete and irrelevant.

Shlomo Kalo explains that the scientific materialism that flourished in the 19th century severely harmed religion and rejected whatever was called spiritual. The institution of the confession priest in particular was badly damaged. The empty void that the newborn psychoanalysis swiftly occupied this institution left behind. In his writings, Kalo claims that psychoanalysis's basic approach is erroneous. It represents the mainline wrong assumptions that happiness is unreachable and that the natural desire of a human being is to exploit his fellow men for his own pleasure and benefit.

Jacques Derrida incorporated aspects of psychoanalytic theory into his theory of deconstruction in order to question what he called the 'metaphysics of presence'. Derrida also turns some of these ideas against Freud to reveal tensions and contradictions in his work. For example, although Freud defines religion and metaphysics as displacements of the identification with the father in the resolution of the Oedipal complex, Derrida (1987) insists that the prominence of the father in Freud's own analysis is itself indebted to the prominence given to the father in Western metaphysics and theology since Plato.

== See also ==
- Autism in psychoanalysis
- Glossary of psychoanalysis
- List of schools of psychoanalysis
- Psychoanalytic sociology
- Training analysis
