= Id, ego and superego =

Psychological concepts by Sigmund Freud

In psychoanalytic theory, the id, ego, and superego are three distinct, interacting agents in the psychic apparatus, outlined in Sigmund Freud's structural model of the psyche. The three agents are theoretical constructs that Freud employed to describe the basic structure of mental life as it was encountered in psychoanalytic practice. Freud himself used the German terms das Es, Ich, and Über-Ich, which literally translate as "the it", "I", and "over-I". The Latin terms id, ego and superego were chosen by his original translators and have remained in use.

The structural model was introduced in Freud's essay Beyond the Pleasure Principle (1920) and further refined and formalised in later essays such as The Ego and the Id (1923). Freud developed the model in response to the perceived ambiguity of the terms "conscious" and "unconscious" in his earlier topographical model.

Broadly speaking, the id is the organism's unconscious array of uncoordinated instinctual needs, impulses and desires; the superego is the part of the psyche that has internalised social rules and norms, largely in response to parental demands and prohibitions in childhood; the ego is the integrative agent that directs activity based on mediation between the id's energies, the demands of external reality, and the moral and critical constraints of the superego. Freud compared the ego, in its relation to the id, to a man on horseback: the rider must harness and direct the superior energy of his mount, and at times allow for a practicable satisfaction of its urges. The ego is thus "in the habit of transforming the id's will into action, as if it were its own."

== History and translation of the terms ==
The terms "id", "ego", and "superego" are not Freud's own; they are Latinisations by his translator James Strachey. Freud himself wrote of "das Es", "das Ich", and "das Über-Ich"—respectively, "the It", "the I", and "the Over-I". Thus, to the German reader, Freud's original terms are to some degree self-explanatory. The term "das Es" was originally used by Georg Groddeck, a physician whose unconventional ideas were of interest to Freud (Groddeck's translators render the term in English as "the It"). The word ego is taken directly from Latin, where it is the nominative of the first person singular personal pronoun and is translated as "I myself" to express emphasis. Figures like Bruno Bettelheim have criticised the way "the English translations impeded students' efforts to gain a true understanding of Freud" by substituting the formalised language of the elaborated code for the quotidian immediacy of Freud's own language.

== Id ==
Freud conceived of the id as the unconscious source of bodily needs, impulses and desires, especially those related to aggression and the sexual drive. The id acts according to the pleasure principle—the psychic force oriented to the immediate gratification of impulse and desire.

Freud described the id as "the dark, inaccessible part of our personality". Understanding of it is limited to analysis of dreams and neurotic symptoms, and it can only be described in terms of its contrast with the ego. It has no organisation and no collective will: it is concerned only with the satisfaction of drives in accordance with the pleasure principle. It is oblivious to reason and the presumptions of ordinary conscious life: "contrary impulses exist side by side, without cancelling each other. . . There is nothing in the id that could be compared with negation. . . nothing in the id which corresponds to the idea of time." The id "knows no judgements of value: no good and evil, no morality. ...Instinctual cathexes seeking discharge—that, in our view, is all there is in the id."

Developmentally, the id precedes the ego. The id consists of the basic instinctual drives that are present at birth, inherent in the somatic organisation, and governed only by the pleasure principle. The psychic apparatus begins as an undifferentiated id, part of which then develops into a structured "ego", a concept of self as an integrated unity that takes the principle of reality into account.

Freud describes the id as "the great reservoir of libido", the energy of desire, usually conceived as sexual in nature, the life instincts that are constantly seeking a renewal of life. He later also postulated a death drive, which seeks "to lead organic life back into the inanimate state." For Freud, "the death instinct would thus seem to express itself—though probably only in part—as an instinct of destruction directed against the external world and other organisms" through aggression. Since the id includes all instinctual impulses, the destructive instinct, as well as eros or the life instincts, is considered to be part of the id.

== Ego ==
The ego acts according to the reality principle. It analyses complex perceptions (things, ideas, dreams), synthesises the appropriate parts into logically coherent interpretations (also models) and rules the muscular apparatus. Since the id's drives are frequently incompatible with the moral prescriptions and religious illusions of contemporary cultures, the ego attempts to direct the libidinal energy and satisfy its demands in accordance with the imperatives of that reality. According to Freud, the ego, in its role as mediator between the id and reality, is often "obliged to cloak the (unconscious) commands of the id with its own preconscious rationalisations, to conceal the id's conflicts with reality, to profess...to be taking notice of reality even when the id has remained rigid and unyielding."

Originally, Freud used the word ego to mean the sense of self, but later expanded it to include psychic functions such as judgment, tolerance, reality testing, control, planning, defense, synthesis of information, intellectual functioning, and memory. The ego is the organizing principle upon which thoughts and interpretations of the world are based.

According to Freud, "the ego is that part of the id which has been modified by the direct influence of the external world ... The ego represents what may be called reason and common sense, in contrast to the id, which contains the passions. ... it is like a man on horseback, who has to hold in check the superior strength of the horse; with this difference, that the rider tries to do so with his own strength while the ego uses borrowed forces." In fact, the ego is required to serve "three severe masters...the external world, the superego and the id." It seeks to find a balance between the natural drives of the id, the limitations imposed by reality, and the strictures of the superego. It is concerned with self-preservation: it strives to keep the id's instinctive needs within limits, adapted to reality and submissive to the superego.

Thus, "driven by the id, confined by the superego, repulsed by reality" the ego struggles to bring about harmony among the competing forces. Consequently, it can easily be subject to "realistic anxiety regarding the external world, moral anxiety regarding the superego, and neurotic anxiety regarding the strength of the passions in the id." The ego may wish to serve the id, trying to gloss over the finer details of reality to minimise conflicts, while pretending to have a regard for reality. But the superego is constantly watching every one of the ego's moves and punishes it with feelings of guilt, anxiety, and inferiority.

To overcome this, the ego employs defense mechanisms. Defense mechanisms reduce the tension and anxiety by disguising or transforming the impulses that are perceived as threatening. Denial, displacement, intellectualisation, fantasy, compensation, projection, rationalisation, reaction formation, regression, repression, and sublimation were the defense mechanisms Freud identified. His daughter Anna Freud identified the concepts of undoing, suppression, dissociation, idealisation, identification, introjection, inversion, somatisation, splitting, and substitution.

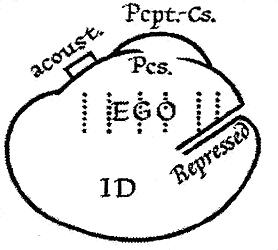
"The ego is not sharply separated from the id; its lower portion merges into it.... But the repressed merges into the id as well, and is merely a part of it. The repressed is only cut off sharply from the ego by the resistances of repression; it can communicate with the ego through the id." (Sigmund Freud, 1923)

In a diagram of the Structural and Topographical Models of Mind, the ego is depicted as being half in the conscious, a quarter in the preconscious, and the other quarter in the unconscious.

== Superego ==
The superego reflects the internalisation of cultural rules, mainly as absorbed from parents, but also other authority figures, and the general cultural ethos. Freud developed his concept of the superego from an earlier combination of the ego ideal and the "special psychical agency which performs the task of seeing that narcissistic satisfaction from the ego ideal is ensured...what we call our 'conscience'." For him, the superego can be described as "a successful instance of identification with the parental agency", and as development proceeds, it also absorbs the influence of those who have "stepped into the place of parents — educators, teachers, people chosen as ideal models".

Thus a child's super-ego is in fact constructed on the model not of its parents but of its parents' super-ego; the contents which fill it are the same and it becomes the vehicle of tradition and of all the time-resisting judgments of value which have propagated themselves in this manner from generation to generation.

The superego aims for perfection. It is the part of the personality structure (mainly but not entirely unconscious) that includes the individual's ego ideals, spiritual goals, and the psychic agency, commonly called "conscience", that criticises and prohibits the expression of drives, fantasies, feelings, and actions. Thus, the superego works in contradiction to the id. It is an internalised mechanism that operates to confine the ego to socially acceptable behaviour, whereas the id merely seeks instant self-gratification.

The superego and the ego are the products of two key factors: the state of helplessness of the child and the Oedipus complex. In the case of the little boy, it forms during the dissolution of the Oedipus complex, through a process of identification with the father figure, following the failure to retain possession of the mother as a love-object out of fear of castration. Freud described the superego and its relationship to the father figure and Oedipus complex thus:

The super-ego retains the character of the father, while the more powerful the Oedipus complex was and the more rapidly it succumbed to repression (under the influence of authority, religious teaching, schooling and reading), the stricter will be the domination of the super-ego over the ego later on—in the form of conscience or perhaps of an unconscious sense of guilt.

In The Ego and the Id, Freud presents "the general character of harshness and cruelty exhibited by the [ego] ideal — its dictatorial Thou shalt". The earlier in the child's development, the greater the estimate of parental power.

. . . nor must it be forgotten that a child has a different estimate of his parents at different periods of his life. At the time at which the Oedipus complex gives place to the super-ego they are something quite magnificent; but later, they lose much of this. Identifications then come about with these later parents as well, and indeed they regularly make important contributions to the formation of character; but in that case they only affect the ego, they no longer influence the super-ego, which has been determined by the earliest parental images.

— New Introductory Lectures on Psychoanalysis, p. 64.

Thus when the child is in rivalry with the parental imago it feels the dictatorial Thou shalt—the manifest power that the imago represents—on four levels: (i) the auto-erotic, (ii) the narcissistic, (iii) the anal, and (iv) the phallic. Those different levels of mental development, and their relations to parental imagos, correspond to specific id forms of aggression and affection.

The concept of the Oedipus complex internalised in the superego - anchored by Freud in the hypothetical murder of the forefather of the Darwinian horde by his sons - has been criticised for its supposed sexism. Women, who cannot develop a fear of castration due to their different genital make-up, do not identify with the father. Therefore, 'their superego is never as implacable, as impersonal, as independent of its emotional origins as we demand of men...they are often more influenced in their judgements by feelings of affection or hostility.' - not by fear of castration, as was the case with 'Little Hans' in his conflict with his father over his wife and mother. However, Freud went on to modify his position to the effect "that the majority of men are also far behind the masculine ideal and that all human individuals, as a result of their human identity, combine in themselves both masculine and feminine characteristics, otherwise known as human characteristics."

== Psychic apparatus ==
In order to overcome difficulties of understanding as far as possible, Freud formulated his "metapsychology" which for Lacan represents a technical elaboration of the concepts of the soul model: dividing the organism into three instances the id is regarded as the germ from which the ego and the superego develop. Driven by an energy that Freud calls libido in direct reference to Plato's Eros, the instances complement each other through their specific functions in a similar way to the organelles of a cell or parts of a technical apparatus. Further distinctions (as the coordinates of topology, dynamics and economy) encouraged Freud to assume that the metapsychological elaboration of the structural model would make it fully compatible with biological sciences such as evolutionary theory and enable a well-founded concept of mental health including a theory of human development, which naturally completed in three successive stages: the oral, anal and genital phase. However, as important as this is for the diagnostic process (illness can only be realised as a deviation from the optimal cooperation of all psycho-organic functions), Freud had to be modest. He came to the conclusion that he had to leave his metapsychological-based model of the soul in the unfinished state of a torso because – as he stated one last time in Moses and Monotheism – there was no well-founded primate research in the first half of 20th century. Without knowledge of the instinctive social behaviour with the corresponding structure of cohabitation of our genetically closest relatives in realm of primates, Freud's thesis of Darwin's primordial horde (as presented for discussion in Totem and Taboo) can't be tested and, if possible, replaced by a realistic model. Horde life and its violent abolition through the introduction of monogamy (as an agreement between the sons who murdered the horde's polygamous father) embody the evolutionary as well as cultural-prehistorical core of psychoanalysis. It stands in contrast to the religiously enigmatic reports about the origin of monogamous couples on earth as an expression of divine will, but closer to the ancient trap to pacify political conflicts among the groups of Neolithic mankind. (See Prometheus' uprising against Zeus, who created Pandora as a fatal wedding gift for Epimetheus to divide and rule these titanic brothers; Plato's myth of spherical men cut into isolated individuals for the same reason; and the similarly resolved revolt of inferior gods in the Flood epic Atra-Hasis). Additional important assumptions are based on it, such as the Oedipus complex, the origin of moral-totemic rules like Incest taboo and, not least, Freud's Civilization and Its Discontents. Nonetheless, due to the lack of ethological primate research, these ideas remained an unproven belief of palaeo-anthropological science – only a hypothesis or "just so story as a not unpleasant English critic wittily called it. But I mean it honours a hypothesis if it shows the capability of creating context and understanding in new areas."

== Structural model and neuropsychoanalysis ==
Freud's basic metapsychological thesis is that the living soul with their needs, consciousness and memory resembles a psychological apparatus to which "spatial extension and composition of several pieces" can be attributed (...) and which "locus ... is the brain (nervous system)".

Modern technology has made it possible to observe the bioelectrical activity of neurons in the living brain. This led to the realisation in which area of the brain the needs for food, skin desire etc. begin to show themselves neuronally; where the highest performances of consciously thinking ego take place (s. frontal lobe); and that other parts of the brain are specialised in storing memories: one of the main function of the superego.

Decisive for this view was Freud's Project for a Scientific Psychology. Written in 1895, it develops the thesis that experiences are stored in the neuronal network through "a permanent change after an event". Freud soon abandoned this attempt and left it unpublished. Insights into the neuronal processes that permanently store experiences in the brain – like engraving the proverbial tabula rasa with some code – belong to the physiological branch of science and lead in a different direction of research than the psychological question of what the differences between consciousness and unconsciousness are. Freud's point of view was that consciousness is directly given – cannot be explained by insights into physiological details. Essentially, two things were known about the living soul: The brain with its nervous system extending over the entire organism and the acts of consciousness. According to Freud, therefore, haphazard phenomena can be integrated between "both endpoints of our knowledge" (findings of modern neurology, just as well as the position of our planet in the universe, for example), but this only contributes to the spatial "localisation of the acts of consciousness", not to their understanding.

== Advantages of the structural model ==
The iceberg metaphor. It is often used to illustrate the spatial relationship between Freud's first model and his new structural model of the soul (id, ego, superego). Disadvantage: The 'iceberg' shows none of the libido as the energetic reservoir that underlies the drive economy aimed at satisfying all innate needs.

In his earlier "topographic model", Freud divided the psyche into three "regions" or "systems": "the Conscious", that which is present to awareness at the surface level of the psyche in any given moment, including information and stimuli from both internal and external sources; "the Preconscious", consisting of material that is merely latent, not present to consciousness but capable of becoming so; and "the Unconscious", consisting of ideas and impulses that are made completely inaccessible to consciousness by the act of repression. By introducing the structural model, Freud was seeking to reduce his reliance on the term "unconscious" in its systematic and topographic sense—as the mental region that is foreign to the ego—by replacing it with the concept of the 'id'." The partition of the psyche outlined in the structural model is thus one that cuts across the topographical model's partition of "conscious vs. unconscious".

Freud conceptualised the structural model because it allowed for a greater degree of precision and diversification. While the need contents of the id are initially unconscious (can become unconscious again as a result of an act of repression), the contents of the ego (such as thinking, perception) and the superego (memory; imprinting) can be both conscious and unconscious. Freud argued that his new model included the option of scientifically describing the structure and functions of the mentally healthy living being and therefore represented an effective diagnostic tool for clarifying the causes of mental disorders:

Transference neuroses correspond to a conflict between the ego and the id; narcissistic neuroses, to a conflict between the ego and the superego; and psychoses, to one between the ego and the external world.

The three newly presented entities, however, remained closely connected to their previous conceptions, including those that went under different names – the systematic unconscious for the id, and the conscience/ego ideal for the superego. Freud never abandoned the topographical division of conscious, preconscious, and unconscious, though he noted that "the three qualities of consciousness and the three provinces of the mental apparatus do not fall together into three peaceful couples...we had no right to expect any such smooth arrangement."

The iceberg image is a visual metaphor, proposed by G. Stanley Hall, depicting the relationship between the ego, id and superego agencies (structural model) and the conscious and unconscious psychic systems (topographic model). In the iceberg metaphor, the entire id and part of both the superego and the ego are submerged in the underwater portion, representing the unconscious region of the psyche. The remaining portions of the ego and superego are displayed above water in the conscious region.

== See also ==
- Censorship (psychoanalysis) – Barrier of the conscious and unconscious
- Ego death – Complete loss of subjective self-identity
- Plato's theory of soul – Philosophical theory
- Psychology of self – Study of the representation of one's identity
- Resistance (psychoanalysis) – Term used in psychoanalysis describing oppositional behaviors
