= Repression (psychoanalysis) =

Unconscious defense mechanism

In psychology and psychoanalytic theory, repression is an unconscious defense mechanism that blocks anxiety-inducing thoughts, memories, or impulses from entering conscious awareness. As such, it is believed to play a major role in mental illnesses.

== Sigmund Freud ==
Sigmund Freud, the founder of psychoanalysis, first learned of repression in his attempts to help his patients reach catharsis without using hypnotic methods. The difficulty of the patients to remember certain experiences led Freud to believe a force within the patient pushed memories out of consciousness. Freud hypothesized "repression" as the process by which these memories become excluded, and "resistance" as the unconscious attempts to keep them out of consciousness. In his 1914 article, "On the History of the Psycho-Analytic Movement", Freud claimed the theory of repression is "the corner-stone on which the whole structure of psychoanalysis rests".

Prior to Freud, the term was used as early as 1824 by Johann Friedrich Herbart, psychologist and founder of pedagogy, whose ideas had influenced Theodor Meynert, Freud's psychiatry teacher, in a discussion of unconscious ideas competing to get into consciousness.

=== Stages ===
Freud considered that there was "reason to assume that there is a primal repression, a first phase of repression, which consists in the psychical (ideational) representative of the instinct being denied entrance into the conscious", as well as a second stage of repression, repression proper (an "after-pressure"), which affects mental derivatives of the repressed representative.

In the primary repression phase, "it is highly probable that the immediate precipitating causes of primal repressions are quantitative factors such as ... the earliest outbreaks of anxiety, which are of a very intense kind". The child realizes that acting on some desires may bring anxiety. This anxiety leads to repression of the desire.

When it is internalized, the threat of punishment related to this form of anxiety becomes the superego, which intercedes against the desires of the id (which works on the basis of the pleasure principle). Freud speculated that "it is perhaps the emergence of the super-ego which provides the line of demarcation between primal repression and after-pressure".

=== Therapy ===
Neurosis may occur when the personality develops under the influence of the superego and the pressure of repressed impulses, leading to behavior that is irrational, self-destructive, or antisocial.

A psychoanalyst may try to ameliorate this behavior by seeking to discover the repressed aspects of the patient's mental processes and reintroducing them to the patient's conscious awareness - "assuming the role of mediator and peacemaker ... to lift the repression".

=== Reactions ===
The philosopher Jean-Paul Sartre maintained that there is no "mechanism" that represses unwanted thoughts. Since "all consciousness is conscious of itself" we will be aware of the process of repression, even if skillfully dodging an issue. The philosopher Thomas Baldwin stated in The Oxford Companion to Philosophy (1995) that Sartre's argument that Freud's theory of repression is internally flawed is based on a misunderstanding of Freud. The philosopher Roger Scruton argued in Sexual Desire (1986) that Freud's theory of repression disproves the claim, made by Karl Popper and Ernest Nagel, that Freudian theory implies no testable observation and therefore does not have genuine predictive power, since the theory has "strong empirical content" and implies testable consequences.

== Later developments ==
The psychoanalyst Otto Fenichel stressed that 'if the disappearance of the original aim from consciousness is called repression, every sublimation is a repression (a "successful" one: through the new type of discharge, the old one has become superfluous)'.

The psychoanalyst Jacques Lacan stressed the role of the signifier in repression — 'the primal repressed is a signifier' — examining how the symptom is 'constituted on the basis of primal repression, of the fall, of the Unterdrückung, of the binary signifier ... the necessary fall of this first signifier'.

Family therapy has explored how familial taboos lead to 'this screening-off that Freud called "repression"', emphasising the way that 'keeping part of ourselves out of our awareness is a very active process ... a deliberate hiding of some feeling from our family'.

== Experimental attempts to study repression ==
According to the psychologist Donald W. MacKinnon and his co-author William F. Dukes, American psychologists began to attempt to study repression in the experimental laboratory around 1930. These psychologists were influenced by an exposition of the concept of repression published by the psychoanalyst Ernest Jones in the American Journal of Psychology in 1911. Like other psychologists who attempted to submit the claims of psychoanalysis to experimental test, they did not immediately try to develop new techniques for that purpose, instead conducting surveys of the psychological literature to see whether "experiments undertaken to test other theoretical assertions" had produced results relevant to assessing psychoanalysis. In 1930, H. Meltzer published a survey of experimental literature on "the relationships between feeling and memory" in an attempt to determine the relevance of laboratory findings to "that aspect of the theory of repression which posits a relationship between hedonic tone and conscious memory." However, according to MacKinnon and Dukes, because Meltzer had an inadequate grasp of psychoanalytic writing, he misinterpreted Freud's view that the purpose of repression is to avoid "unpleasure", taking the term to mean simply something unpleasant, whereas for Freud it actually meant deep-rooted anxiety. Nevertheless, Meltzer pointed out shortcomings in the studies he reviewed, and in MacKinnon and Dukes's view he also "recognized that most of the investigations which he reviewed had not been designed specifically to test the Freudian theory of repression."

In 1934, the psychologist Saul Rosenzweig and his co-author G. Mason criticized Meltzer, concluding that the studies he reviewed suffered from two basic problems: that the studies "worked with hedonic tone associated with sensory stimuli unrelated to the theory of repression rather than with conative hedonic tone associated with frustrated striving, which is the only kind of 'unpleasantness' which, according to the Freudian theory, leads to repression" and that they "failed to develop under laboratory control the experiences which are subsequently to be tested for recall". In MacKinnon and Dukes' view, psychologists who wanted to study repression in the laboratory "faced the necessity of becoming clear about the details of the psychoanalytic formulation of repression if their researches were to be adequate tests of the theory" but soon discovered that "to grasp clearly even a single psychoanalytic concept was an almost insurmountable task." MacKinnon and Dukes attribute this situation to the way in which Freud repeatedly modified his theory "without ever stating clearly just which of his earlier formulations were to be completely discarded, or if not discarded, how they were to be understood in the light of his more recent assertions."

MacKinnon and Dukes write that, while psychoanalysts were at first only uninterested in attempts to study repression in laboratory settings, they later came to reject them. They comment that while "the psychologists had criticized each other's researches largely on the grounds that their experimental techniques and laboratory controls had not been fully adequate, the psychoanalysts rejected them on the more sweeping grounds that whatever else these researches might be they simply were not investigations of repression." They relate that in 1934, when Freud was sent reprints of Rosenzweig's attempts to study repression, he responded with a dismissive letter stating that "the wealth of reliable observations" on which psychoanalytic assertions were based made them "independent of experimental verification." In the same letter, Freud concluded that Rosenzweig's studies "can do no harm." MacKinnon and Dukes describe Freud's conclusion as a "first rather casual opinion", and state that most psychoanalysts eventually adopted a contrary view, becoming convinced that "such studies could indeed be harmful since they misrepresented what psychoanalysts conceived repression to be."

Writing in 1962, MacKinnon and Dukes state that experimental studies "conducted during the last decade" have largely abandoned the term "repression", choosing instead to refer to the phenomenon as "perceptual defense". They argue that this change of terminology has had a major effect on how the phenomenon is understood, and that psychoanalysts, who had attacked earlier studies of repression, did not criticize studies of perceptual defense in a similar fashion, instead neglecting them. They concluded by noting that psychologists remained divided in their view of repression, some regarding it as well-established, others as needing further evidence to support it, and still others finding it indefensible.

A 2020 meta-analysis of 25 studies examined the evidence that active memory suppression actually leads to decreased memory. It was found that in people with a repressive coping strategy, the willful avoidance of remembering certain memory contents leads to a significant reduction in memory performance for these contents. In addition, healthy people were better able to do this than anxious or depressed people. These results indicate that forgetting induced by suppression is a hallmark of mental wellbeing.

== Repressed memories ==
One of the issues Freud struggled with was the status of the childhood "memories" recovered from repression in his therapy. He concluded that "these scenes from infancy are not always true. Indeed, they are not true in the majority of cases, and in a few of them they are the direct opposite of the historical truth". Controversy arose in the late 20th century about the status of such "recovered memories", particularly of child abuse, with many claiming that Freud had been wrong to ignore the reality of such recovered memories.

While accepting "the realities of child abuse", the feminist Elaine Showalter considered it important that one "distinguishes between abuse remembered all along, abuse spontaneously remembered, abuse recovered in therapy, and abuse suggested in therapy". Memory researcher Elizabeth Loftus has shown that it is possible to implant false memories in individuals and that it is possible to "come to doubt the validity of therapeutically recovered memories of sexual abuse ... [as] confabulations". However, criminal prosecutors continue to present them as evidence in legal cases.

There is debate about the possibility of the repression of psychological trauma. While some evidence suggests that "adults who have been through overwhelming trauma can suffer a psychic numbing, blocking out memory of or feeling about the catastrophe", it appears that the trauma more often strengthens memories due to heightened emotional or physical sensations. (However these sensations may also cause distortions, as human memory in general is filtered both by layers of perception, and by "appropriate mental schema ... spatio-temporal schemata"). However, in contrast to this position, child psychotherapist James Norris published The Memory Matrix in 2026, providing a psychoanalytic model of forgetting, linked to dissociation and repression, that accounts for mechanisms for all types of forgetting, particularly repressed memories linked to trauma.

== See also ==
- Censorship (psychoanalysis) – Barrier of the conscious and unconscious
- Foreclosure (psychoanalysis) – Concept by the psychoanalyst Jacques Lacan
- Narcissistic defence sequences – Mental processes which preserve the self
- Thought suppression – Conscious effort to discontinue a thought
