= Sigmund Freud bibliography =

This is a list of writings published by Sigmund Freud. Books are either linked or in italics.

== Selected works ==
- 1884 On Coca
- 1891 On Aphasia
- 1892 A Case of Successful Treatment by Hypnotism
- 1893 Charcot
- 1893 On the Psychical Mechanism of Hysterical Phenomena
- 1894 The Neuro-Psychoses of Defence
- 1894 Obsessions and phobias
- 1894 On the Grounds for Detaching a Particular Syndrome from Neurasthenia under the Description “Anxiety Neurosis”
- 1895 Project for a Scientific Psychology
- 1895 Studies on Hysteria (German: Studien über Hysterie; co-authored with Josef Breuer)
- 1896 The Aetiology of Hysteria
- 1896 Heredity and the Aetiology of the Neuroses
- 1896 Further Remarks on the Neuro-Psychoses of Defence
- 1898 Sexuality in the Aetiology of the Neuroses
- 1899 Screen Memories
- 1899 An Autobiographical Note
- 1899 The Interpretation of Dreams (German: Die Traumdeutung)
- 1901 On Dreams (abridged version of The Interpretation of Dreams)
- 1904 The Psychopathology of Everyday Life (German: Zur Psychopathologie des Alltagslebens)
- 1905 Jokes and Their Relation to the Unconscious
- 1905 Fragment of an Analysis of a Case of Hysteria (Dora)
- 1905 Three Essays on the Theory of Sexuality (German: Drei Abhandlungen zur Sexualtheorie)
- 1905 On Psychotherapy
- 1905 Psychopathic Characters on the Stage
- 1906 My Views on the Part Played by Sexuality in the Aetiology of the Neuroses
- 1906 Psycho-Analysis and the Establishment of the Facts in Legal Proceedings
- 1907 Obsessive Actions and Religious Practices
- 1907 Delusion and Dream in Jensen's Gradiva (German: Der Wahn und die Träume in W. Jensens "Gradiva")
- 1908 The Sexual Enlightenment of Children
- 1908 Character and Anal Erotism (German: Charakter und Analerotik)
- 1908 On the Sexual Theories of Children
- 1908 "Civilized" Sexual Morality and Modern Nervous Illness (German: Die "kulturelle" Sexualmoral und die moderne Nervosität)
- 1908 Creative Writers and Day-Dreaming
- 1908 Hysterical Phantasies and their Relation to Bisexuality
- 1909 Family Romances
- 1909 Some General Remarks on Hysterical Attacks
- 1909 Analysis of a Phobia in a Five-Year-Old Boy (Little Hans)
- 1909 Notes upon a Case of Obsessional Neurosis (Rat Man)
- 1910 Five Lectures on Psycho-Analysis
- 1910 Leonardo da Vinci, A Memory of His Childhood (German: Eine Kindheitserinnerung des Leonardo da Vinci)
- 1910 The Antithetical Meaning of Primal Words
- 1910 The Future Prospects of Psycho-analytic Therapy
- 1910 “Wild” psycho-analysis
- 1910 The Psycho-Analytic View of Psychogenic Disturbance of Vision
- 1910 A Special Type of Choice of Object made by Men
- 1911 The Handling of Dream-Interpretation in Psycho-Analysis
- 1911 Formulations on the Two Principles of Mental Functioning'
- 1911 Psycho-Analytic Notes on an Autobiographical Account of a Case of Paranoia (Schreber)
- 1912 On the Universal Tendency to Debasement in the Sphere of Love
- 1912 Recommendations to Physicians Practising Psycho-analysis
- 1912 Types of Onset of Neurosis
- 1912 The Dynamics of Transference
- 1912 Contributions to a Discussion on Masturbation
- 1912 A Note on the Unconscious in Psycho-Analysis
- 1913 Totem and Taboo: Resemblances Between the Psychic Lives of Savages and Neurotics (German: Totem und Tabu: Einige Übereinstimmungen im Seelenleben der Wilden und der Neurotiker)
- 1913 The Claims of Psycho-Analysis to Scientific Interest
- 1913 On Beginning the Treatment (Further recommendations on the technique of psycho-analysis)
- 1913 The Disposition to Obsessional Neurosis
- 1913 Theme of the Three Caskets
- 1914 Remembering, Repeating and Working-through (Further recommendations on the technique of psycho-analysis)
- 1914 On Narcissism: an Introduction
- 1914 The Moses of Michelangelo
- 1914 The History of the Psychoanalytic Movement (German: Zur Geschichte der psychoanalytischen Bewegung)
- 1915–17 Introductory Lectures on Psycho-Analysis (German: Vorlesungen zur Einführung in die Psychoanalyse)
- 1915 Observations on Transference-Love (Further recommendations on the technique of psycho-analysis)
- 1915 Thoughts for the Times on War and Death (German: Zeitgemäßes über Krieg und Tod)
- 1915 Instincts and their Vicissitudes
- 1915 Repression
- 1915 The Unconscious
- 1915 A Case of Paranoia Running Counter to the Psycho-Analytic Theory of the Disease
- 1915 Some Character-Types Met with in Psycho-Analytic Work
- 1915 On Transience
- 1916 A Mythological Parallel to a Visual Obsession
- 1917 Mourning and Melancholia
- 1917 A Difficulty on the Path of Psycho-Analysis
- 1917 On Transformations of Instinct as Exemplified in Anal Erotism
- 1917 A Metapsychological Supplement to the Theory of Dreams
- 1918 From the History of an Infantile Neurosis (Wolfman)
- 1918 The Taboo of Virginity
- 1918 Lines of Advance in Psycho-Analytic Therapy
- 1918 Introduction to Psycho-Analysis and the War Neuroses
- 1918 On the Teaching of Psycho-Analysis in the Universities
- 1918 James J. Putnam
- 1919 A Child is Being Beaten
- 1919 The Uncanny (German: Das Unheimliche)
- 1920 The Psychogenesis of a Case of Homosexuality in a Woman
- 1920 Beyond the Pleasure Principle (German: Jenseits des Lustprinzips)
- 1920 A Note on the Prehistory of The Technique of Analysis
- 1920 Supplements to the Theory of Dreams
- 1921 Psycho-analysis and Telepathy
- 1921 Group Psychology and the Analysis of the Ego (German: Massenpsychologie und Ich-Analyse)
- 1922 Medusa's Head (German: Das Medusenhaupt)
- 1922 Dreams and Telepathy
- 1922 Some Neurotic Mechanisms in Jealousy, Paranoia and Homosexuality
- 1923 The Ego and the Id (German: Das Ich und das Es)
- 1923 A Seventeenth-Century Demonological Neurosis (Christoph Haizmann)
- 1923 Infantile Genital Organisation
- 1924 Neurosis and Psychosis
- 1924 The Loss of Reality in Neurosis and Psychosis
- 1924 The Economic Problem of Masochism
- 1924 The Dissolution of the Oedipus Complex
- 1925 The Resistances to Psycho-analysis
- 1925 Josef Breuer
- 1925 A Note upon the 'Mystic Writing-Pad'
- 1925 An Autobiographical Study (1935 Postscript)
- 1925 Negation
- 1925 Some Psychical Consequences of the Anatomical Distinction between the Sexes
- 1926 Karl Abraham
- 1926 Inhibitions, Symptoms and Anxiety
- 1926 The Question of Lay Analysis (German: Die Frage der Laieanalyse)
- 1927 The Future of an Illusion (German: Die Zukunft einer Illusion)
- 1927 Fetishism
- 1927 Humour
- 1928 Dostoevsky and Parricide
- 1930 Civilization and Its Discontents (German: Das Unbehagen in der Kultur)
- 1931 Libidinal Types
- 1931 Female Sexuality
- 1932 The Acquisition of Control Over Fire
- 1933 Sandor Ferenczi
- 1933 New Introductory Lectures on Psycho-Analysis
- 1933 Why War? (German: Warum Krieg? co-authored with Albert Einstein)
- 1936 A Disturbance of Memory on the Acropolis
- 1937 Lou Andreas-Salome
- 1937 Analysis Terminable and Interminable
- 1937 Constructions in Analysis
- 1938 An Outline of Psycho-Analysis (German: Abriß der Psychoanalyse)
- 1938 Some Elementary Lessons in Psycho-Analysis
- 1938 The Splitting of the Ego in the Process of Defence
- 1938 A Comment on Anti-Semitism
- 1939 Moses and Monotheism (German: Der Mann Moses und die monotheistische Religion) PDF

=== The Standard Edition ===
The Standard Edition of the Complete Psychological Works of Sigmund Freud. Translated from the German under the general editorship of James Strachey, in collaboration with Anna Freud, assisted by Alix Strachey, Alan Tyson, and Angela Richards. 24 volumes, London: Hogarth Press and the Institute of Psycho-Analysis, 1953–1974.

1. Pre-Psycho-Analytic Publications and Unpublished Drafts (1886–1899).
2. Studies in Hysteria (1893-1895). By Josef Breuer and S. Freud
3. Early Psycho-Analytic Publications (1893–1899)
4. The Interpretation of Dreams (I) (1900)
5. The Interpretation of Dreams (II) and On Dreams (1900–1901)
6. The Psychopathology of Everyday Life (1901)
7. A Case of Hysteria, Three Essays on Sexuality and Other Works (1901–1905)
8. Jokes and their Relation to the Unconscious (1905)
9. Jensen's 'Gradiva', and Other Works (1906–1909)
10. The Cases of 'Little Hans' and the 'Rat Man' (1909)
11. Five Lectures on Psycho-Analysis, Leonardo and Other Works (1910)
12. Case History of Schreber, Papers on Technique and Other Works (1911–1913)
13. Totem and Taboo and Other Works (1913–1914)
14. On the History of the Psycho-Analytic Movement, Papers on Meta-psychology and Other Works (1914–1916)
15. Introductory Lectures on Psycho-Analysis (Parts I and II) (1915–1916)
16. Introductory Lectures on Psycho-Analysis (Part III) (1916–1917)
17. An Infantile Neurosis and Other Works (1917–1919)
18. Beyond the Pleasure Principle, Group Psychology and Other Works (1920–1922)
19. The Ego and the Id and Other Works (1923–1925)
20. An Autobiographical Study, Inhibitions, Symptoms and Anxiety, Lay Analysis and Other Works (1925–1926)
21. The Future of an Illusion, Civilization and its Discontents and Other Works (1927–1931)
22. New Introductory Lectures on Psycho-Analysis and Other Works (1932–1936)
23. Moses and Monotheism, An Outline of Psycho-Analysis and Other Works (1937–1939)
24. Indexes and Bibliographies (Compiled by Angela Richards, 1974)

=== The Revised Standard Edition of the Complete Psychological Works of Sigmund Freud ===
The Revised Standard Edition of the Complete Psychological Works of Sigmund Freud, edited by Mark Solms, was published in 2024. It was reviewed by Peter L. Rudnytsky.
