= Psychoanalytic sociology =

Application of psychoanalysis to sociology

Psychoanalytic sociology is the research field that analyzes society using the same methods that psychoanalysis applies to analyze an individual.

'Psychoanalytic sociology embraces work from divergent sociological traditions and political perspectives': its common 'emphasis on unconscious mental processes and behavior renders psychoanalytic sociology a controversial subfield within the broader sociological discipline' (as with psychoanalysis in academic psychology).

Similarly, "sociatry" applies psychiatry to society itself, such as in the work of Jacob L. Moreno.

== History ==
=== Freud ===
The desire to establish a link between psychoanalysis and sociology appears very early on in Freud's work. The articles Obsessive Actions and Religious Practices (1907b) and "Civilized" Sexual Morality and Modern Nervous Illness (1908d) are evidence of this'. Though the latter article was 'the earliest of Freud's full-length discussions of the antagonism between civilization and instinctual life, his convictions on the subject went back much further'. In the 1908 article, however, the 'sociological aspects of that antagonism form the main subject'.

The same mode of approach was also employed by Freud in his book Group Psychology and the Analysis of the Ego (1921), where he argued that 'crowd psychology, and with it all social psychology, is parasitic on individual psychology'. Civilization and Its Discontents ( 1930), however, formed his fullest sociological study, wherein he 'anchored his analysis of social and political life in a theory of human nature very much his own'.

In 'works, from Totem and Taboo (1912-1913a) to Moses and Monotheism (1939a), Freud analyzed the events that presided over the foundation and modification of social links, the advent of civilization, and the rise of its current discontents'; while James Strachey described The Future of an Illusion (1927) as 'the first of a number of sociological works to which Freud devoted most of his remaining years'.

=== Freudians ===
==== Freudo-Marxism ====
'Many of the early analysts were Marxists ... Wilhelm Reich, Paul Federn and Otto Fenichel the most notable among them', and were fully prepared, in Erich Fromm's words, to at least '"try to explain psychic structure as determined by social structure"'. Theodor Adorno's essays on psychoanalysis reappropriated Freud's work and applied it to social phenomena, and in his Freudian Theory and the Pattern of Fascist Propaganda (1951) in particular, he outlined a theory of social psychology.

In 1946, Fenichel considered that '"Comparative sociology of education" is a new scientific field of the greatest practical importance', and concluded more generally that it is 'experience, that is, the cultural conditions, that transforms potentialities into realities, that shapes the real mental structure of man by forcing his instinctual demands into certain directions'.

=== Lacanian ===
From a different angle, the early Lacan argued that 'any "concrete psychology" must be augmented by a reference to ethnology, history and law'; and later drew on 'Lévi-Strauss's structural anthropology...[for] what will be termed the Symbolic'.

Post-Lacanians would continue to explore such sociological areas as 'the superego as the moment of common cultural binding', or the way 'the social bond, the Law binding us, is...a bond of the impossibility of obedience or disobedience'.

=== 1960s and the Left ===
The 1960s saw a radical sociopsychoanalysis exert wide popular influence under the guidance of a number of different thinkers. David Cooper attempted to explore 'in terms of Freud's discovery...the social function of the family as an ideological conditioning device'. R. D. Laing 'has adapted Sartre's existential psychoanalysis..[as he] analyzes the concept of alienation': looking at the 'analysis of alienation in sociological and clinical senses', Laing concluded that 'Alienation as our present destiny is achieved only by outrageous violence perpetrated by human beings on human beings'.

Norman O. Brown examined a 'politics made out of delinquency...even as the crime, so also conscience is collective'. Herbert Marcuse explored how in late modernity "repressive desublimation is indeed operative in the sexual sphere...as the by-product of the social controls of technological reality, which extend liberty while intensifying domination".

== Lacanians ==
Duane Rousselle has developed an interventionist approach to sociological theory by highlighting the centrality of the claim made by the French psychoanalyst Jacques Lacan that "discourse is what constitutes a social bond."

== Feminist contributions ==
Nancy Chodorow's work, in particular The Reproduction of Mothering and The Power of Feelings, has been significant within feminist theory. 'Although Chodorow uses a psychoanalytic approach, she rejects the instinctual determinism of the classic Freudian account in favor of a more nuanced, social psychological approach that incorporates recent developments in object relations theory'.

Jessica Benjamin has also been influential in this project of linking social theory to psychoanalysis, as with The Shadow of the Other. Juliet Mitchell, however, has criticised the way 'Benjamin's injunction is made within a psychosocial, not a psychoanalytical framework'.

== Criticism ==
Freud warned early on of any 'attempt of this kind to carry psychoanalysis over to the cultural community...that it is dangerous, not only with men but also with concepts, to tear them from the sphere in which they have originated and been evolved'.

Others have since observed that 'efforts to link sociology and psychoanalysis have yielded varied results....[some], intoxicated by the success of analysis, have indiscriminately applied psychoanalytic concepts to social reality and have succeeded only in bastardizing psychoanalysis (making it a management tool) and disfiguring social processes'.

== See also ==
- Baudrillard
- Crowd psychology
- Critical theory
- Frankfurt School
- Gender studies
- Narcissism of small differences
- Neo-Freudian
- Social criticism
