= Aggressionism =

Philosophical theory

Aggressionism is a philosophical theory that the only real cause of war is human aggression, which refers to the "general tendency to attack members of one's species." It is argued that aggression is a natural response to defend vital interests such as territory, family, or identity if threatened. This theory has dominated much evolutionary thought about human nature.

Many evolutionary biologists discount aggressionism as it promotes human extinction through war. The idea is that if homicide were the norm, the human species would have wiped itself out millions of years ago. There is also the claim that aggression is not a universal instinct in the animal kingdom. However, some sources note that aggression serves the animal kingdom well since it brings the balanced distribution of animals of the same species over the available environment and that it can be viewed as a universal, externally directed drive that is possibly connected to a survival instinct.

== Concept ==
The concept of aggressionism is based on the root word "aggression." In this particular concept, aggression occurs in all species as a form of protection of their own or of their territory in order to keep their young safe. However, though most species protect against their predators, some also protect from their own. For example, lions are very territorial and fight other grown, male lions to keep their status as the alpha. Similar to humans, if an invader attacks, human instinct leads them to defend oneself and fend them off. When necessary, for the sake of survival, most species become aggressive to get food to survive. Yet, aggressionism isn't the same as aggression. Aggressionism is the concept of aggression particularly made for humans, as it is more complex than simply wanting to survive. This is demonstrated in one of its definitions describing it as "the action of a state in violating by force the rights of another state, particularly its territorial rights; an unprovoked offensive, attack, invasion, or the like..." or a "hostile or destructive mental attitude or behavior" which leads to conflict and eventually, bloodshed.

Aggressionism specifies human nature in its hostile form when ideologies of multiple humans do not coincide with each other. However, the form of hostility that humans convey isn't direct in terms of street fights. This form of aggression directs humans in a composed manner between the leaders of nations or organizations in which leads to war. In this perspective, the hostility is contained due to the persons having respect in each other. Rather than being savage like animals, humans use their intellect to defeat their opponent in war—therefore, placing pride, greed, and belief in their own skill to lead their nation to victory. Before a war starts, there is always disagreement between the leaders. Never is there a leader raging at the other. Calmly, they would always say that it is unfortunate that the two nations disagree and would go back to their respective countries to declare war.

== Cause of War ==
Although it has been directly stated, that aggressionism is a philosophy theory that humans are the cause of war, there are more direct reasons for conflicts to escalate to war. Aggressionism is a theory that describes complex behavior of human nature that involves strong beliefs in one's own ideology. It is a description of people who cannot see the views of others and would only see their own as the only right one in the world. Throughout history, there have been a number of people who were like this and had caused war.

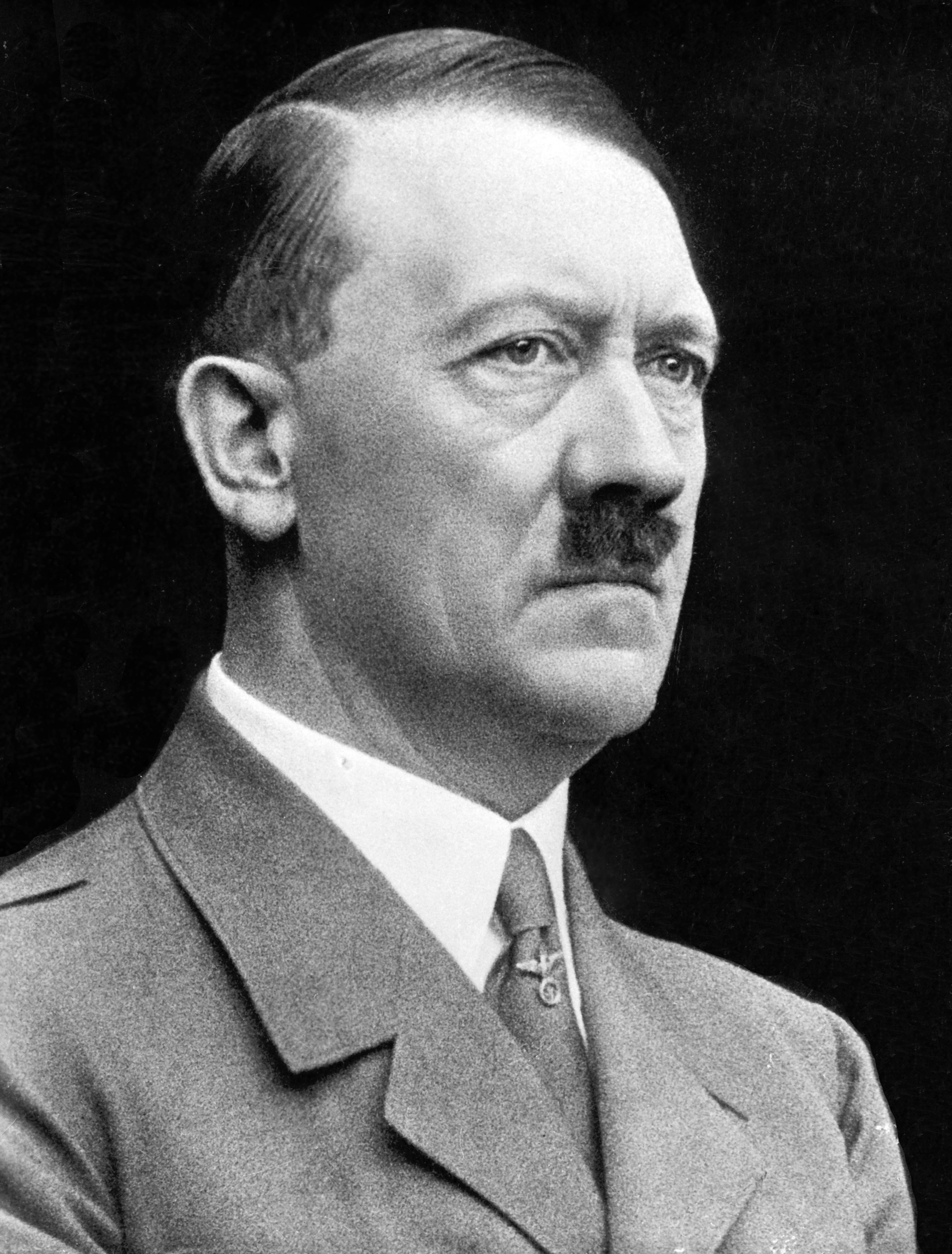
Adolf Hitler

=== Examples of Political Leaders Who Displayed Aggressionism ===
Adolf Hitler is a primary example of a person who displayed aggressionism. In his time of reign, he installed a government that practiced fascism which is a form of statism. This type of government is a form of radical authoritarian nationalism. This type of nation is ruled by dictatorial power with overwhelming control over all the aspects of the country including the economy, society, and its beliefs. Hitler had a strong belief that the Jewish were in fact, the cause of Germany's loss in WWI causing his ideology to circulate around a hate for the Jewish people. Therefore, his aggressionism had started to take form in war through the initial invasion of Poland.

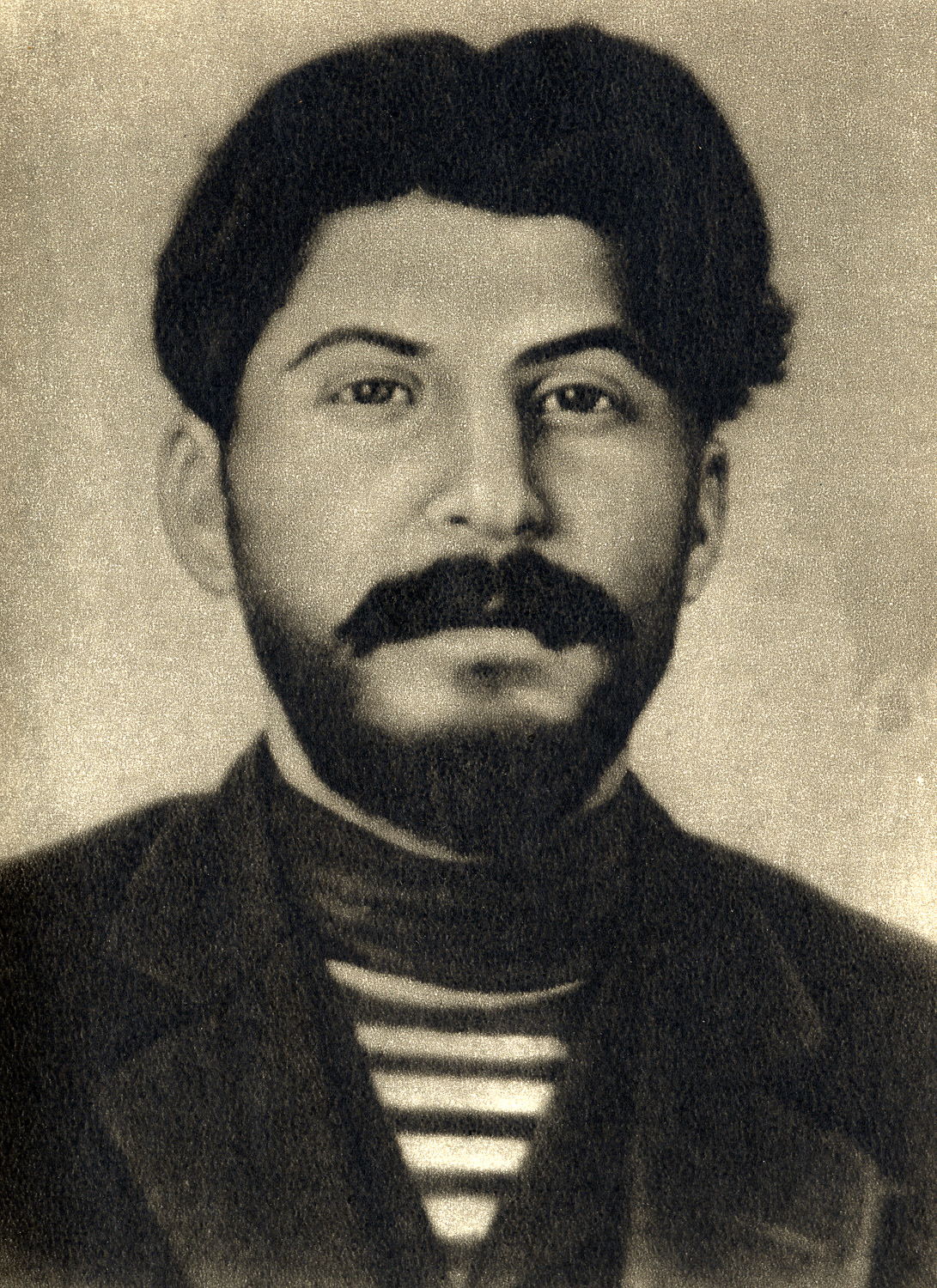
Joseph Stalin

Joseph Stalin is another example that also displayed aggressionism. However, Stalin's aggressionism instead was more subtle than Hitler's. Stalin believed that with his dictatorial power, he would be able to bring Russia in its time out of its famine and spread his ideology of communism towards the rest of the world. During Stalin's reign, he transformed Russia to "an industrial and military superpower." He had created programs to boost the food supply and boost its economy, however this had killed millions. After WWII, the Soviet Union and the US had become superpowers and tension grew between these countries which started the Cold War. To gain advantage over the other, Stalin attempted to spread communism towards other states, countries, and nations. Thus, the subtle aggressionism. Unlike Hitler, he had helped spread his ideologies to other leaders, including China's Mao Zedong.

== Source of Aggressionism ==
In both of the examples of aggressionism, there are basic natures of human beings that cause their ideologies to take form. With Hitler, he had displayed his overwhelming hate for the Jewish due to his nationalism for Germany. One of the more basic forms of emotion is hate, which was the source of his aggression towards the millions of Jewish who were killed during the Holocaust. The cause of war was due to his inhumane actions towards a specific group of people. Therefore, his unreasonable action for killing people, thinking that he has the right to do so, is one of the most lethal forms of aggression. For Stalin, he had created a country through is dictatorship with the ideology of communism. He had aggressed his beliefs upon his own people with his plans of creating a country that would be seen as a military superpower. He had caused many to die with the famine and plan to boost agriculture. However, the source for this action was due to the fact that he believed in his ideology of Marxism/Leninism.

== See also ==
- Aggression
- Death drive
- Homo homini lupus
- Thoughts for the Times on War and Death
