= Topical humor =

Humor related to current events

The topical humor and topical jokes is humor framed around a specific topic related to current events or dealing with issues that are important or popular at the current time. The value of this kind of humor often diminishes when the topic is no longer widely discussed in public.

Besides jokes, topical humor may be in forms of news parody, "Top 10" lists, demotivators, cartoons, etc. Sometimes old jokes may be turned into topical ones due to the newly acquired salience.

Liisi Laineste of Estonian Literary Museum writes that topical jokes and news parodies emphasize the need to look critically at the flow of the news.

== Sigmund Freud ==
Sigmund Freud described the "topicality" (Note: The English term "topicality" is used in the translation by Joyce Crick. The translation by Abraham Brill uses the term "actuality", see wikisource:Wit and its relation to the unconscious/IV") aspect of jokes in his book Jokes and Their Relation to the Unconscious:

There are jokes which are completely independent of this [topicality] condition, and in a monograph on jokes we are obliged to make almost exclusive use of examples of that kind. But we cannot forget that, in comparison with these perennial jokes, we have perhaps laughed even more heartily at others which it is difficult for us to use now because they would call for long commentaries and even with such help would not produce their original effect. These latter jokes contained allusions to people and events which at the time were ‘topical’, which had aroused general interest and still kept it alive. When this interest had ceased and the business in question had been settled, these jokes too lost a part of their pleasurable effect and indeed a very considerable part.

== Topical humor of standup comedians ==
Garry Trudeau described how stand-up monologues are created from the news by professionals. Contrary to a popular opinion that they are to a large degree improvisations, in fact they are produced by a team of specialized professionals. In his example of a workflow, the work starts with "clippers", who sift though numerous news headlines and lead paragraphs for joke ideas. Next in the pipeline is a "joke engineer", who defines the structure of the joke: its components, the speed of its build-up, the idea of the punch line, etc. Next enter a "joke stylist", who creates a draft and sends it to the "polish man". The final step of joke creation is done by the "timing coach", who is responsible for the timing of phrases and pauses. Only after that the joke is passed to the "talent", who will be delivering the monologue, who dry-runs it, adding personal individuality, as well as "recovery lines" to be used when a joke sizzles.
