= Sigmund Freud's views on religion =

Freud's views of religion

Sigmund Freud's views on religion are described in several of his books and essays. Freud considered God a fantasy, based on the infantile need for a dominant father figure. He claimed that during the development of early civilization, God and religion were necessities to help restrain our violent impulses, but in modern times can be discarded in favor of science and reason.

== Freud's religious background ==
In An Autobiographical Study, originally published in 1925, Freud recounts that "My parents were Jews, and I have remained a Jew myself." Familiarity with Bible stories, from an age even before he learned to read, had "an enduring effect on the direction of my interest." In 1873, upon attending the University at Vienna, he first encountered antisemitism: "I found that I was expected to feel myself inferior and an alien because I was a Jew." Before his wedding, Freud desired to convert to Protestantism to avoid a Jewish ceremony but was ultimately persuaded not to.

In a prefatory note to the Hebrew translation of Totem and Taboo (1930) Freud describes himself as "an author who is ignorant of the language of holy writ, who is completely estranged from the religion of his fathers—as well as from every other religion" but who remains "in his essential nature a Jew and who has no desire to alter that nature".

== Obsessive Actions and Religious Practices ==
In Obsessive Actions and Religious Practices (1907), his earliest writing about religion, Freud suggests that religion and neurosis are similar products of the human mind: neurosis, with its compulsive behavior, is "an individual religiosity", and religion, with its repetitive rituals, is a "universal obsessional neurosis".

== Totem and Taboo ==
In Totem and Taboo, published in 1913, Freud analyzes the tendency of primitive tribes to promulgate rules against incest within groups named for totem animal and objects, and to create taboos regarding actions, people and things. He notes that taboos (such as that regarding incest) still play a significant role in modern society but that totemism "has long been abandoned as an actuality and replaced by newer forms". Freud believes that an original act of patricide—the killing and devouring of "the violent primal father"—was remembered and re-enacted as a "totem meal...mankind's earliest festival" which was "the beginning of so many things—of social organization, of moral restrictions and of religion". Freud develops this idea further in Moses and Monotheism, his last book, discussed below. For Freud, the totem is a father figure that replaces the actual father who was killed, which both allays the intense guilt of the sons and prevents one of them assuming the position of father and dominating the others. Initially represented by an animal or other natural feature, the totem later develops into human form as God as societies evolve. Freud further goes to attribute creation of gods to humans: "...we know that, like gods, [demons] are only the product of the psychic powers of man; they have been created from and out of something."

In An Autobiographical Study Freud elaborated on the core idea of Totem and Taboo: "This view of religion throws a particularly clear light upon the psychological basis of Christianity, in which, it may be added, the ceremony of the totem-feast still survives with but little distortion in the form of Communion."

== The Future of an Illusion ==
In The Future of an Illusion (1927), Freud refers to religion as an illusion which is "perhaps the most important item in the psychical inventory of a civilization". In his estimation, religion provides for defense against "the crushingly superior force of nature" and "the urge to rectify the shortcomings of civilization which made themselves painfully felt". He concludes that all religious beliefs are "illusions and insusceptible of proof".

Freud then examines the issue of whether, without religion, people will feel "exempt from all obligation to obey the precepts of civilization". He notes that "civilization has little to fear from educated people and brain-workers" in whom secular motives for morality replace religious ones, but he acknowledges the existence of "the great mass of the uneducated and oppressed" who may commit murder if not told that God forbids it, and who must be "held down most severely" unless "the relationship between civilization and religion" undergoes "a fundamental revision".

Freud asserts that dogmatic religious training contributes to a weakness of intellect by foreclosing lines of inquiry. He argues that "in the long run nothing can withstand reason and experience, and the contradiction which religion offers to both is all too palpable." The book expressed Freud's "hope that in the future science will go beyond religion, and reason will replace faith in God".

In an afterword to An Autobiographical Study (1925, revised 1935), Freud states that his "essentially negative" view of religion changed somewhat after The Future of an Illusion; while religion's "power lies in the truth which it contains, I showed that that truth was not a material but a historical truth."

Harold Bloom calls The Future of an Illusion "one of the great failures of religious criticism." Bloom believes that Freud underestimated religion, and that as a result his criticisms of it were no more convincing than T. S. Eliot's criticisms of psychoanalysis. Bloom suggests that psychoanalysis and Christianity are both interpretations of the world and of human nature, and that while Freud believed that religious beliefs are illusions and delusions, the same may be said of psychoanalytic theory. In his view nothing is accomplished with regard to either Christianity or psychoanalysis by listing their illusions and delusions.

== Civilization and its Discontents ==
In Civilization and its Discontents, published in 1930, Freud says that man's need for religion could be explained by "a sensation of 'eternity', a feeling as of something limitless, unbounded—as it were, 'oceanic'", and adds, "I cannot discover this 'oceanic' feeling in myself". Freud suggests that the "oceanic feeling", which his friend Romain Rolland had described to him in a letter, is a wish fulfillment, related to the child's egoistic need for protection.

James Strachey, editor and translator of this and other works of Freud, describes the main theme of the work as "the irremediable antagonism between the demands of instinct and the restrictions of civilization". Freud also treats two other themes, the development of civilization recapitulating individual development, and the personal and social struggle between "Eros" and "Thanatos", life and death urges.

Freud expresses deep pessimism about the odds of humanity's reason triumphing over its destructive forces. He added a final sentence to the book in a 1931 edition, when the threat of Hitler was already becoming apparent: "But who can foresee with what success and with what result?"

Atheist political commentator and author Christopher Hitchens cited this book as a reason behind Freud being one of his most influential figures. Hitchens described the book as a "pessimistic unillusioned tale of realism," noting that Freud "wasted little time in identifying [the need for religion] as infantile" and pointing out a summary by Freud's biographer Ernest Jones that "Human happiness, therefore, does not seem to be the purpose of the universe."

== Moses and Monotheism ==
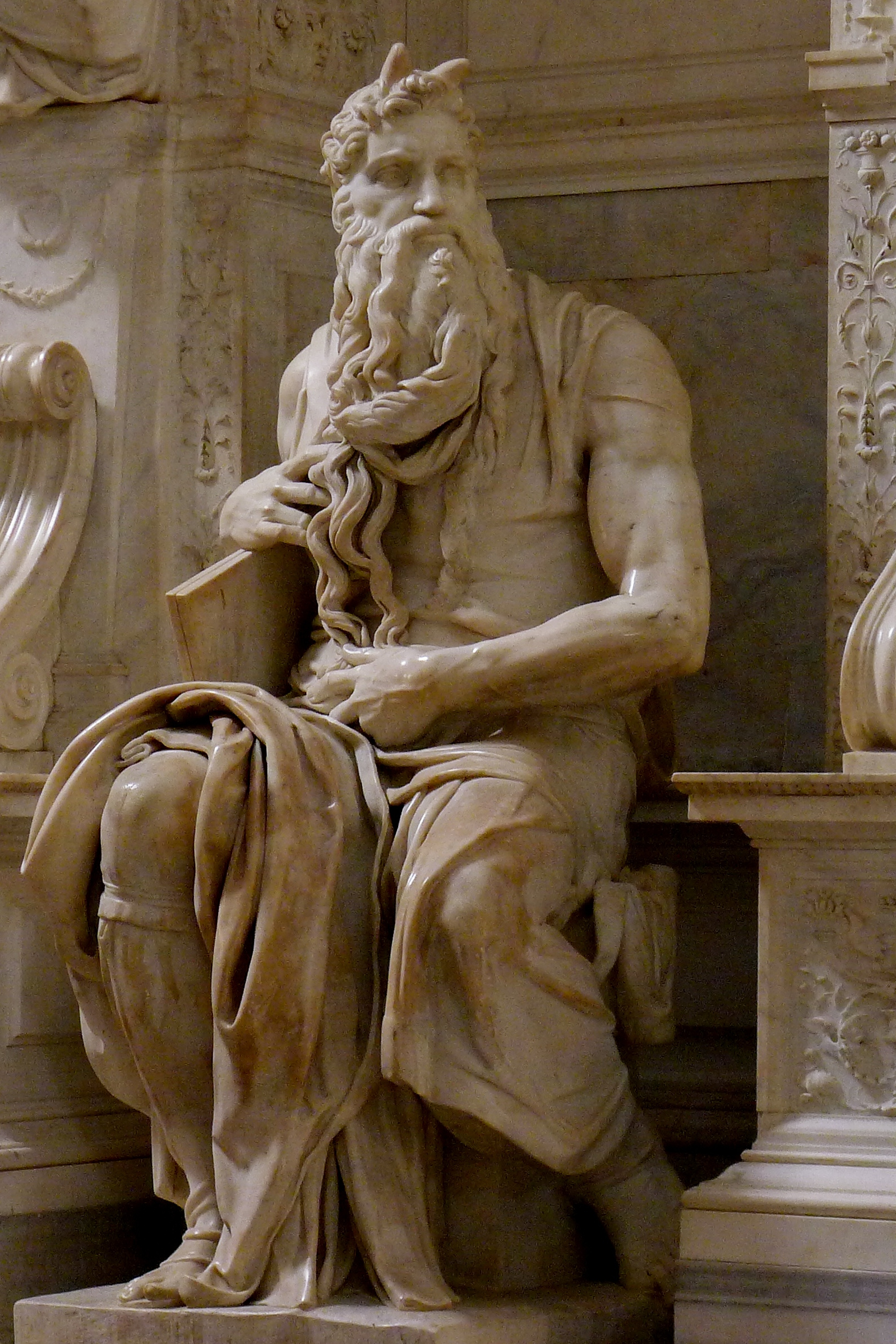
Moses by Michelangelo

Moses and Monotheism was Freud's last book, published in 1939, the year of his death. In it, Freud makes certain guesses and assumptions about Moses as a historical figure, particularly that he was not born Jewish but was adopted by Jews (the opposite of the Biblical story) and that he was murdered by his followers, who then via reaction formation revered him and became irrevocably committed to the monotheistic idea he represented.

Mark Edmundson comments that in writing Moses and Monotheism, Freud, while not abandoning his atheism, perceived for the first time a value in the abstract form of monotheism—the worship of an invisible God, without Jesus or saints—practiced by the Jews.

So the mental labor of monotheism prepared the Jews — as it would eventually prepare others in the West — to achieve distinction in law, in mathematics, in science and in literary art. It gave them an advantage in all activities that involved making an abstract model of experience, in words or numbers or lines, and working with the abstraction to achieve control over nature or to bring humane order to life. Freud calls this internalizing process an “advance in intellectuality,” and he credits it directly to religion.

In Moses and Monotheism, Freud proposed that Moses had been a priest of Akhenaten who fled Egypt after the pharaoh's death and perpetuated monotheism through a different religion.

According to Jay Geller, Moses and Monotheism is full of "false starts, deferred conclusions, repetitions, rationalizations, defensive self-justifications, questionable methods, and weak arguments that are readily acknowledged as such by Freud."

== The Question of a Weltanschauung ==
The later developments in Freud’s views on religion are summarized in his lecture on the Question of a Weltanschauung, Vienna, 1932. There he describes the struggles of science in its relations with three other powers: art, philosophy and religion.

Art is an illusion of some sort and a long story. Philosophy goes astray in its method. Religion constructed a consistent and self-contained Weltanschauung to an unparalleled degree. By comparison science is marked by certain negative characteristics. Among them it asserts that there are no sources of knowledge of the universe other than the intellectual working over of carefully scrutinized observations, and none that is derived from revelation, intuition or divination.

On relations between science and philosophy and science and religion Freud has this much to say in one sentence: “It is not permissible to declare that science is one field of human mental activity and that religion and philosophy are others, at least equal in value, and that science has no business to interfere with the other two: that they all have an equal claim to be true and that everyone is at liberty to choose from which he will draw his convictions and in which he will place his belief.” Then he goes on to say that such an impermissible view is regarded as superior and tolerant, but that it is not tenable, that it shares all the pernicious features of an entirely unscientific Weltanschauung and that it is equivalent to one in practice.

With respect to religion in particular he explains that a religious person had once been feeble and helpless. A parent had protected him. Later such a person gets more insight into the perils of life and he rightly concludes that fundamentally he still remains just as helpless as he was in his childhood.

Then he harks back to the mnemic image.

== Responses and criticisms ==
In a 1949 essay in Commentary magazine, Irving Kristol says that Freud exposed what he believed to be the irrationality of religion without evidence, but has not substituted anything beyond "a mythology of rational despair".

In a 1949 book entitled Christianity after Freud, Benjamin Gilbert Sanders draws parallels between the theory of psychoanalysis and Christian religion, referring to Jesus Christ as "the Great Psychiatrist" and Christians' love for Christ as "a more positive form of the Transference".

Karen Armstrong notes in A History of God that "not all psychoanalysts agreed with Freud's view of God," citing Alfred Adler, who believed God was a projection which had been "helpful to humanity", and C.G. Jung, who, when asked whether he believed in God, said "Difficult to answer, I know. I don't need to believe. I know."

Tony Campolo, founder of the Evangelical Association for the Promotion of Education, observes that "With Freud, God, and the need for God-dictated restraints, had been abolished," resulting in an increase in social chaos and unhappiness which could have been avoided by adherence to religion.

A number of critics draw the parallel between religious beliefs and Freud's theories, that neither can be scientifically proven, but only experienced subjectively. Lee Siegel writes that "you either grasp the reality of Freud's dynamic notion of the subconscious intuitively – the way, in fact, you do or do not grasp the truthfulness of Ecclesiastes – or you cannot accept that it exists."

== See also ==
- Freud and Philosophy
- The Foundations of Psychoanalysis
- Theories of religion

== Sources ==
- Freud, Sigmund (1961) [1927], Strachey, James (ed.), The future of an illusion, Norton, ISBN 978-0-393-00831-9
