= Pleasure principle (psychology) =

Instinctual seeking of pleasure

In Freudian psychoanalysis, the pleasure principle (German: Lustprinzip) is the instinctive seeking of pleasure and avoiding of pain to satisfy biological and psychological needs. Specifically, the pleasure principle is the animating force behind the id.

== Precursors ==
Epicurus in the ancient world, and later Jeremy Bentham, laid stress upon the role of pleasure in directing human life, the latter stating: "Nature has placed mankind under the governance of two sovereign masters, pain and pleasure".

Freud's most immediate predecessor and guide however was Gustav Theodor Fechner and his psychophysics.

== Freudian developments ==
Freud used the idea that the mind seeks pleasure and avoids pain in his Project for a Scientific Psychology of 1895, as well as in the theoretical portion of The Interpretation of Dreams of 1900, where he termed it the 'unpleasure principle'.

In the Two Principles of Mental Functioning of 1911, contrasting it with the reality principle, Freud spoke for the first time of "the pleasure-unpleasure principle, or more shortly the pleasure principle". In 1923, linking the pleasure principle to the libido he described it as the watchman over life; and in Civilization and Its Discontents of 1930 he still considered that "what decides the purpose of life is simply the programme of the pleasure principle".

While on occasion Freud wrote of the near omnipotence of the pleasure principle in mental life, elsewhere he referred more cautiously to the mind's strong (but not always fulfilled) tendency towards the pleasure principle.

== Two principles ==
Freud contrasted the pleasure principle with the counterpart concept of the reality principle, which describes the capacity to defer gratification of a desire when circumstantial reality disallows its immediate gratification. In infant and early childhood, the id rules behavior by obeying only the pleasure principle. People at that age only seek immediate gratification, aiming to satisfy cravings such as hunger and thirst, and at later ages the id seeks out sex.

Maturity is learning to endure the pain of deferred gratification. Freud argued that "an ego thus educated has become 'reasonable'; it no longer lets itself be governed by the pleasure principle, but obeys the reality principle, which also, at bottom, seeks to obtain pleasure, but pleasure which is assured through taking account of reality, even though it is pleasure postponed and diminished".

=== The beyond ===
In his book Beyond the Pleasure Principle, published in 1921, Freud considered the possibility of "the operation of tendencies beyond the pleasure principle, that is, of tendencies more primitive than it and independent of it". By examining the role of repetition compulsion in potentially over-riding the pleasure principle, Freud ultimately developed his opposition between Libido, the life instinct, and the death drive.

== See also ==
- Hedonism
- Id, ego and super-ego
- Ignacio Matte Blanco
- Jouissance
- Pierre Janet
- Reality principle
- Self-control
- Utilitarianism
