= Repetition compulsion =

Tendency to repeat a traumatic event

Repetition compulsion is the unconscious tendency of a person to repeat a traumatic event or its circumstances. This may take the form of symbolically or literally re-enacting the event, or putting oneself in situations where the event is likely to occur again. Repetition compulsion can also take the form of dreams in which memories and feelings of what happened are repeated, and in cases of psychosis, may even be hallucinated.

As a "key component in Freud's understanding of mental life, 'repetition compulsion' ... describes the pattern whereby people endlessly repeat patterns of behaviour which were difficult or distressing in earlier life".

== Freud ==
=== Initial description ===
Sigmund Freud's use of the concept of "repetition compulsion" (German: Wiederholungszwang) was first defined in the article of 1914, Erinnern, Wiederholen und Durcharbeiten ("Remembering, Repeating and Working-Through"). Here he noted how "the patient does not remember anything of what he has forgotten and repressed, he acts it out, without, of course, knowing that he is repeating it ... For instance, the patient does not say that he remembers that he used to be defiant and critical toward his parents' authority; instead, he behaves in that way to the doctor".

=== Beyond the Pleasure Principle ===
He explored the repetition compulsion further in his 1920 essay Beyond the Pleasure Principle, describing four aspects of repetitive behavior, all of which seemed odd to him from the point of view of the mind's quest for pleasure/avoidance of unpleasure.

- The first was the way "dreams occurring in traumatic neuroses have the characteristic of repeatedly bringing the patient back into the situation of his accident" rather than, for example, "show[ing] the patient pictures from his healthy past".
- The second came from children's play. Freud reported observing a child throw his favorite toy from his crib, become upset at the loss, then reel the toy back in, only to repeat this action. Freud theorized that the child was attempting to master the sensation of loss "in allowing his mother to go away without protesting", but asked in puzzlement "How then does his repetition of this distressing experience as a game fit in with the pleasure principle?".
- The third was the way (noted in 1914) that the patient, exploring in therapy a repressed past, "is obliged to repeat the repressed material as a contemporary experience instead of ... remembering it as something belonging to the past ... the compulsion to repeat the events of his childhood in the transference evidently disregards the pleasure principle in every way".
- The fourth was the so-called "destiny neurosis", manifested in "the life-histories of men and women ... [as] an essential character-trait which remains always the same and which is compelled to find expression in a repetition of the same experience".

All such activities appeared to Freud to contradict the organism's search for pleasure, and therefore "to justify the hypothesis of a compulsion to repeat—something that seems more primitive, more elementary, more instinctual than the pleasure principle which it over-rides": "a daemonic current/trait", "a daemonic character", a "daemonic compulsion", likely alluding to the Latin motto errare humanum est, perseverare autem diabolicum ("to err is human, to persist [in committing such errors] is of the devil"). Following this line of thought, he would come to stress that "an instinct is an urge inherent in organic life to restore an earlier state of things" (an explanation that some scholars have labeled as "metaphysical biology"), so to arrive eventually at his concept of the death drive.

Along the way, however, Freud had in addition considered a variety of more purely psychological explanations for the phenomena of the repetition compulsion which he had observed. Traumatic repetitions could be seen as the result of an attempt to retrospectively "master" the original trauma, a child's play as an attempt to turn passivity into activity: "At the outset he was in a passive situation ... but by repeating it, unpleasurable though it was, as a game, he took on an active part".

At the same time, the repetition of unpleasant experiences in analysis could be considered "unpleasure for one system [the ego] and simultaneously satisfaction for the other [the id]. In the second edition of 1921, he extended the point, stating explicitly that transference repetitions "are of course the activities of instincts intended to lead to satisfaction; but no lesson has been learnt from the old experience of these activities having led only to unpleasure".

=== Later mentions ===
Five years later, in Inhibition, Symptom and Anxiety, he would quietly revise his earlier definition—"There is no need to be discouraged by these emendations ... so long as they enrich rather than invalidate our earlier views"—in his new formula on "the power of the compulsion to repeat—the attraction exerted by the unconscious prototypes upon the repressed instinctual process".

== Later psychoanalytic developments ==
It was in the later, psychological form that the concept of the repetition compulsion passed into the psychoanalytic mainstream. Otto Fenichel in his "second generation" compendium The Psychoanalytic Theory of Neurosis stressed two main kinds of neurotic repetition.

On the one hand, there were "Repetitions of traumatic events for the purpose of achieving a belated mastery ... seen first and most clearly in children's games", although the "same pattern occurs in the repetitive dreams and symptoms of traumatic neurotics and in many similar little actions of normal persons who ... repeat upsetting experiences a number of times before these experiences are mastered". Such traumatic repetitions could themselves appear in active or passive forms. In a passive form, one chooses his or her most familiar experiences consistently as a means to deal with problems of the past, believing that new experiences will be more painful than their present situation or too new and untested to imagine. In the active, participatory form, a person actively engages in behavior that mimics an earlier stressor, either deliberately or unconsciously, so that in particular events that are terrifying in childhood become sources of attraction in adulthood. For instance, a person who was spanked as a child may incorporate this into their adult sexual practices; or a victim of sexual abuse may attempt to seduce another person of authority in his or her life (such as their boss or therapist): an attempt at mastery of their feelings and experience, in the sense that they unconsciously want to go through the same situation but that it not result negatively as it did in the past.

On the other hand, there were "Repetitions due to the tendency of the repressed to find an outlet". Here the drive of the repressed impulse to find gratification brought with it a renewal of the original defence: "the anxiety that first brought about the repression is mobilized again and creates, together with the repetition of the impulse, a repetition of the anti-instinctual measures". Fenichel considered that "Neurotic repetitions of this kind contain no metaphysical element", and "even the repetition of the most painful failure of the Oedipus complex in the transference during a psychoanalytic cure is not 'beyond the pleasure principle'".

Later writers would take very similar views. Eric Berne saw as central to his work "the repetition compulsion which drives men to their doom, the power of death, according to Freud ... [who] places it in some mysterious biological sphere, when after all it is only the voice of seduction"—the seduction of the repressed and unconscious id.

Erik Erikson saw the destiny neurosis—the way "that some people make the same mistakes over and over"—in the same light: "the individual unconsciously arranges for variations of an original theme which he has not learned either to overcome or to live with". Ego psychology would subsequently take for granted "how rigidly determined our lives are—how predictable and repetitive ... the same mistake over and over again".

Object relations theory, stressing the way "the transference is a live relationship ... in the here-and-now of the analysis, repeating the way that the patient has used his objects from early in life" considered that "this newer conception reveals a purpose ... [in] the repetition compulsion": thus "unconscious hope may be found in repetition compulsion, when unresolved conflicts continue to generate attempts at solutions which do not really work ... [until] a genuine solution is found".

== Later formulations ==
By the close of the twentieth century, the psychoanalytic view of repetition compulsion had come into increasing dialogue with a variety of other discourses, ranging from attachment theory through brief psychodynamic therapy to cognitive behavioural therapy.

Attachment theory saw early developmental experiences leading to "schemas or mental representations of relationship ... [which] become organized, encoded experiential and cognitive data ... that led to self-confirmation".

The core conflictual relationship theme—"core wishes that the individual has in relation to others"—was seen in brief psychodynamic therapy as linked to the way in "a repetition compulsion, the client will behave in ways that engender particular responses from others that conform with previous experiences in interpersonal relationships".

Psychological schemas—described in cognitive psychology, social psychology, and schema therapy—are "an enduring symbolic framework that organizes constellations of thought, feeling, memory, and expectation about self and others". In some cases psychological schemas may be seen as analogous to the role in psychoanalytic theory of early unconscious fixations in fueling the repetition compulsion.

== See also ==
- Pleasure principle
- Psychical inertia
- Flashback
- Sigmund Freud § Life and death drives
