= Beyond the Pleasure Principle =

1920 essay by Sigmund Freud

- Author: Sigmund Freud
- Original title: Jenseits des Lustprinzips
- Language: German
- Publication date: 1920
- Publication place: Germany

Beyond the Pleasure Principle (German: Jenseits des Lustprinzips) is a 1920 essay by Sigmund Freud. It marks a major turning point in the formulation of his drive theory, where Freud had previously attributed self-preservation in human behavior to the drives of Eros and the regulation of libido, governed by the pleasure principle. Revising this as inconclusive, Freud theorized beyond the pleasure principle, newly considering the death drives (or Thanatos, the Greek personification of death) which refers to the tendency towards destruction and annihilation, often expressed through behaviors such as aggression, repetition compulsion, and self-destructiveness.

== Overview ==
The essay, marking Freud's major revision of his drive theory, elaborates on the struggle between two opposing drives. In the first few sections, Freud describes these as Eros, which produces creativity, harmony, sexual connection, reproduction, and self-preservation; and the "death drives" (what some call "Thanatos"), which brings destruction, repetition, aggression, compulsion, and self-destruction.

In sections IV and V, Freud posits that the process of creating living cells binds energy and creates an imbalance. It is the pressure of matter to return to its original state which gives cells their quality of living. The process is analogous to the creation and exhaustion of a battery. This pressure for molecular diffusion is referred to as a "death-wish". The compulsion of the matter in cells to return to a diffuse, inanimate state extends to the whole living organism. Thus, the psychological death-wish is a manifestation of an underlying physical compulsion present in every cell, which Freud directly corresponds to the death drives.

Freud also states the basic differences, as he saw them, between his approach and Carl Jung's and summarizes published research into basic drives in Section VI to establish his revisions.

== Analysis and synopsis ==
What have been called the "two distinct frescoes or canti" of Beyond the Pleasure Principle break between sections III and IV. If, as Otto Fenichel remarked, Freud's "new [instinctual] classification has two bases, one speculative, and one clinical", thus far the clinical. In Freud's own words, the second section "is speculation, often far-fetched speculation, which the reader will consider or dismiss according to his individual predilection"—it has been noted that "in Beyond the Pleasure Principle, Freud used that unpromising word "speculations" more than once".

=== Clinical evidence (sections I–III) ===
Freud begins with "a commonplace then unchallenged in psychoanalytic theory: 'The course of mental events is automatically regulated by the pleasure principle ... a strong tendency toward the pleasure principle'". After considering the inevitable presence of unpleasant experiences in the life of the mind, he concludes the book's first section to the effect that the presence of such unpleasant experiences "does not contradict the dominance of the pleasure principle ... does not seem to necessitate any far-reaching limitation of the pleasure principle."

==== Exceptions to the pleasure principle ====
Freud proceeds to look for "evidence, for the existence of hitherto unsuspected forces 'beyond' the pleasure principle." He found exceptions to the universal power of the pleasure principle—"situations ... with which the pleasure principle cannot cope adequately"—in four main areas: children's games, as exemplified in his grandson's famous "fort-da" game; "the recurrent dreams of war neurotics ...; the pattern of self-injuring behaviour that can be traced through the lives of certain people ["fate neurosis"]; the tendency of many patients in psycho-analysis to act out over and over again unpleasant experiences of their childhood."

==== Repetition compulsion ====
From these cases, Freud inferred the existence of motivations beyond the pleasure principle. Freud already felt in 1919 that he could safely postulate "the principle of a repetition compulsion in the unconscious mind, based upon instinctual activity and probably inherent in the very nature of the instincts—a principle powerful enough to overrule the pleasure-principle". In the first half of Beyond the Pleasure Principle, "a first phase, the most varied manifestations of repetition, considered as their irreducible quality, are attributed to the essence of drives" in precisely the same way.

Building on his 1914 article "Recollecting, Repeating and Working Through", Freud highlights how the "patient cannot remember the whole of what is repressed in him, and ... is obliged to repeat the repressed material as a contemporary experience instead of ... remembering it as something belonging to the past:" a "compulsion to repeat."

==== Independence from the pleasure principle ====
Freud still wanted to examine the relationship between repetition compulsion and the pleasure principle. Although compulsive behaviors evidently satisfied some sort of drive, they were a source of direct unpleasure. Somehow, "no lesson has been learnt from the old experience of these activities having led only to unpleasure. In spite of that, they are repeated, under pressure of a compulsion". Also noting repetitions in the lives of normal people—who appeared to be "pursued by a malignant fate or possessed by some 'daemonic' power," likely alluding to the Latin motto errare humanum est, perseverare autem diabolicum ("to err is human, to persist [in committing errors] is of the devil")—Freud concludes that the human psyche includes a compulsion to repeat that is independent of the pleasure principle.

=== Speculation (sections IV–VII) ===
Arguing that dreams in which one relives trauma serve a binding function in the mind, connected to repetition compulsion, Freud admits that such dreams are an exception to the rule that the dream is the fulfillment of a wish. Asserting that the first task of the mind is to bind excitations to prevent trauma (so that the pleasure principle does not begin to dominate mental activities until the excitations are bound), he reiterates the clinical fact that for "a person in analysis ... the compulsion to repeat the events of his childhood in the transference evidently disregards the pleasure principle in every way".

==== Biology and repetition compulsion ====
Freud begins to look for analogies of repetition compulsion in the "essentially conservative ... feature of instinctual life ... the lower we go in the animal scale the more stereotyped does instinctual behavior appear". Thereafter "a leap in the text can be noticed when Freud places the compulsion to repeat on an equal footing with 'an urge ... to restore an earlier state of things'"—ultimately that of the original inorganic condition. Declaring that "the aim of life is death" and "inanimate things existed before living ones", Freud interprets an organism's drive to avoid danger only as a way of avoiding a short-circuit to death: the organism seeks to die in its own way. He thus found his way to his celebrated concept of the death drive, an explanation that some scholars have labeled as "metaphysical biology".

Thereupon, "Freud plunged into the thickets of speculative modern biology, even into philosophy, in search of corroborative evidence"—looking to "arguments of every kind, frequently borrowed from fields outside of psychoanalytic practice, calling to the rescue biology, philosophy, and mythology". He turned to prewar experiments on protozoa—of perhaps questionable relevance, even if it is not the case that 'his interpretation of the experiments on the successive generations of protozoa contains a fatal flaw'. The most that can perhaps be said is that Freud did not find "any biological argument which contradicts his dualistic conception of instinctual life", but at the same time, "as Jones (1957) points out, 'no biological observation can be found to support the idea of a death instinct, one which contradicts all biological principles'" either.

Another line of enquiry into the relation between psychoanalysis and biology has emerged from Jacques Derrida’s readings of Beyond the Pleasure Principle in his posthumously published lecture series La vie la mort. Francesco Vitale has demonstrated how closely Derrida’s interest in the natural sciences is linked to his engagement with Freud, activating the theory of the death drives in terms of a radical re-thinking of biological life as constitutively inscribed by death. Within the historiography of psychoanalysis, special attention has been drawn to Freud's cooperation with Sándor Ferenczi about biology. Between 1914 and 1924, Freud and Ferenczi worked on the unfinished project of a so called bioanalysis. The aim was to re-interpret organic life departing from psychoanalytic notions. This undertaking has left several traces in Beyond the Pleasure Principle and it forms a psychoanalytic counter-narrative to the popular Darwinisms of Freud's time.

==== Masochism as clinical manifestation ====
Freud then continued with a reference to "the harbour of Schopenhauer's philosophy"; but in groping for a return to the clinical he admitted that "it looks suspiciously as though we were trying to find a way out of a highly embarrassing situation at any price". Freud eventually decided that he could find a clinical manifestation of the death instinct in the phenomenon of masochism, "hitherto regarded as secondary to sadism ... and suggested that there could be a primary masochism, a self-injuring tendency which would be an indication of the death instinct". In a footnote he cited Sabina Spielrein admitting that "A considerable part of this speculation has been anticipated in a work which is full of valuable matter and ideas but is unfortunately not entirely clear to me: (Sabina Spielrein: Die Destruktion als Ursache des Werdens, Jahrbuch für Psychoanalyse, IV, 1912). She designates the sadistic component as 'destructive'." To then explain the sexual instinct as well in terms of a compulsion to repeat, Freud inserts a myth from Plato that humans are driven to reproduce in order to join together the sexes, which had once existed in single individuals who were both male and female—still "in utter disregard of disciplinary distinctions"; and admits again the speculative nature of his own ideas, "lacking a direct translation of observation into theory ... One may have made a lucky hit or one may have gone shamefully astray".

==== Conclusion ====
Nevertheless, with the libido or Eros as the life force finally set out on the other side of the repetition compulsion equation, the way was clear for the book's closing "vision of two elemental pugnacious forces in the mind, Eros and Thanatos, locked in eternal battle".

== The essay's relation to Freud's grief ==
Freud's daughter Sophie died at the start of 1920, partway between Freud's first (1919) version and the version of Beyond the Pleasure Principle reworked and published in 1920. Freud insisted that the death had no relation to the contents of the book. In a July 18, 1920, letter to Max Eitingon, Freud wrote, "The Beyond is now finally finished. You will be able to confirm that it was half ready when Sophie lived and flourished". He had however already written (in June) to colleague and psychoanalyst Sándor Ferenczi "that 'curious continuations' had turned up in it, presumably the part about the potential immortality of protozoa". Ernest Jones considers Freud's claim on Eitingon "a rather curious request ... [perhaps] an inner denial of his novel thoughts about death having been influenced by his depression over losing his daughter". Others have also wondered about "inventing a so-called death instinct—is this not one way of theorising, that is, disposing of—by means of a theory—a feeling of the "demoniac" in life itself ... exacerbated by the unexpected death of Freud's daughter"?—and it is certainly striking that "the term 'death drive'—Todestrieb—entered his correspondence a week after Sophie Halberstadt's death"; so that we may well accept at the very least that the "loss can claim a subsidiary role ... [in]his analytic preoccupation with destructiveness".

== Continuation of themes in the essay ==
On his final page, Freud acknowledges that his theorising "in turn raises a host of other questions to which we can at present find no answer". Whatever legitimate reservations there may be about "the improbability of our speculations. A queer instinct, indeed, directed to the destruction of its own organic home", Freud's speculative essay has proven remarkably fruitful in stimulating further psychoanalytic research and theorising, both in himself and in his followers; and we may consider it as a prime example of Freud in his role "as a problem finder—one who raises new questions ... called attention to a whole range of human phenomena and processes". Thus for example André Green has suggested that Freud "turned to the biology of micro-organisms ... because he was unable to find the answers to the questions raised by psychoanalytic practice": the fruitfulness of the questions—in the spirit of 'Maurice Blanchot's sentence, "La réponse est le malheur de la question" [The answer is the misfortune of the question]'—remains nonetheless unimpaired.

=== Freud's later writing and legacy ===
The distinction between pleasure principle and death drive led Freud to restructure his model of the psyche.

With Beyond the Pleasure Principle, Freud also introduced the question of violence and destructiveness in humans. These themes play an important role in Civilization and Its Discontents, in which Freud suggests that civilization has repeatedly tried and failed to repress the death drives. Freud's indication "that in cases of traumatism there is a 'lack of any preparedness for anxiety' ... is a forerunner of the distinction he would later make ... between 'automatic anxiety' and 'anxiety as a signal'".

- For Jacques Lacan, repetition compulsion was one of the "four ... terms introduced by Freud as fundamental concepts, namely, the unconscious, repetition, the transference and the drive".
- Eric Berne adapted the way "Freud speaks of the repetition compulsion and the destiny compulsion ... to apply them to the entire life courses" of normals and neurotics alike.
- Gilles Deleuze observed that "in Beyond the Pleasure Principle, Freud is not really preoccupied with the exceptions to that principle", concluding that "there are no exceptions to the principle—though there would indeed seem to be some rather strange complications in the workings of pleasure."
- Both Melanie Klein and Lacan were to adopt versions of the death drive in their own theoretical constructs. "Klein's concept of the death drive differs from Freud's ... but there is an ever-increasing reference to the death drive as a given cause of mental development" in her works. Lacan for his part considered that "the death drive is only the mask of the symbolic order, in so ... far as it has not been realised", adding modestly of Beyond the Pleasure Principle "... either it makes not the least bit of sense or it has exactly the sense I say it has".

== Critical reception ==
Within the psychoanalytic reception, Beyond the Pleasure Principle may be Freud's most controversial text. At the same time it is likely his most commented text in philosophical literature. Ever since its publication in 1920 it has been recognised as the zenith of Freudian metapsychology. Jacques Lacan described it as an "extraordinary text of Freud's, unbelievably ambiguous, almost confused". Peter Gay remarked in Freud: A Life for Our Time that "Beyond the Pleasure Principle is a difficult text ... the reassuring intimacy with clinical experience that marks most of Freud's papers, even at their most theoretical, seems faint here, almost absent". On the same terms, Gilles Deleuze wrote in his 1967 literary study Masochism: Coldness and Cruelty that "the masterpiece which we know as Beyond the Pleasure Principle is perhaps the one where he engaged most directly—and how penetratingly—in specifically philosophical reflection." Ernest Jones, one of Freud's closest associates and a member of his Inner Ring, stated that "the train of thought [is] by no means easy to follow ... and Freud's views on the subject have often been considerably misinterpreted."

Jones concluded that "This book is further noteworthy in being the only one of Freud's which has received little acceptance on the part of his followers". Many of Freud's colleagues and students initially rejected the theories proposed in Beyond the Pleasure Principle because the idea of a drive towards death seemed strange.
