= Humor in Freud =

Sigmund Freud noticed that humor, like dreams, can be related to unconscious content. In the 1905 book Jokes and Their Relation to the Unconscious (German: Der Witz und seine Beziehung zum Unbewußten), as well as in the 1928 journal article Humor, Freud distinguished contentious jokes from non-contentious or silly humor. In fact, he sorted humor into three categories that could be translated as: joke, comic, and mimetic.

== Freud's theory of humor ==
In Freud's view, jokes (the verbal and interpersonal form of humor) happened when the conscious allowed the expression of thoughts that society usually suppressed or forbade. Freud also regarded jokes as comparable to dreams, insofar as he deemed both processes to involve a release of desires and impulses that are typically repressed by the conscience. The superego allowed the ego to generate humor. A benevolent superego allowed a light and comforting type of humor, while a harsh superego created a biting and sarcastic type of humor. A very harsh superego suppressed humor altogether. Freud’s humor theory, like most of his ideas, was based on a dynamic among id, ego, and super-ego. The commanding superego would impede the ego from seeking pleasure for the id, or to momentarily adapt itself to the demands of reality, a mature coping method. Moreover, Freud (1960) followed Herbert Spencer's ideas of energy being conserved, bottled up, and then released like so much steam venting to avoid an explosion. Freud was imagining psychic or emotional energy, and this idea is now thought of as the relief theory of laughter.

Later, Freud returned his attention to humor noting that not everyone is capable of formulating humor.

== The different types of humor ==
If jokes let out forbidden thoughts and feelings that the conscious mind usually suppresses in deference to society, there was an interaction between unconscious drives and conscious thoughts.

Mimesis, on the other hand, was a process involving two different representations of the body in our mind. For example, in the phrase “Their hearts are in the right place,” the heart has two representations. One is, of course, anatomical while the other is a metaphorical reference to caring and meaning well.

=== Tendentious jokes ===
Tendentious jokes are jokes that have a particular bias or agenda, often aimed at promoting a certain viewpoint or attacking a particular group or individual. They may be intended to be humorous, but they often rely on stereotypes, prejudices, or other forms of bias to make their point.

=== Non-tendentious jokes ===
The comic meant applying “to one and the same act of ideation, two different ideational methods” (Freud, 1905, 300; as cited in Matte, G. (2001)). William Shakespeare’s Falstaff would be an example of Freud's "comic," generating laughter by expressing previously repressed inhibition. An upset American says at Sunday School: "Roosevelt is my Shepherd; I am in want. He makes me to lie down on park benches; he leads me in the paths of destruction for His party's sake".

== In advertising ==
An analysis of content from business-to-business advertising magazines in the United States, United Kingdom, and Germany found a high (23 percent) overall usage of humor. The highest percentage was found in the British sample at 26 percent. Of the types of humor found by McCullough and Taylor, three categories correspond with Freud's grouping of tendentious (aggression and sexual) and non-tendentious (nonsense) wit. 20 percent of the humor are accounted for as “aggression” and “sexual.” “Nonsense” is listed at 18 percent.

== Criticism ==
It has been claimed that Freud's division is artificial and not very clear. According to Altman (2006), these divisions are more semantic than functional. Hence, all three types of humor may be the result of the dynamic of the conscious and unconscious. For example, hate and anger can be hidden by a false sense of love and compassion, which could be the opposite of what was meant, and which could formulate a joke.
