= Homo homini lupus =

Latin proverb

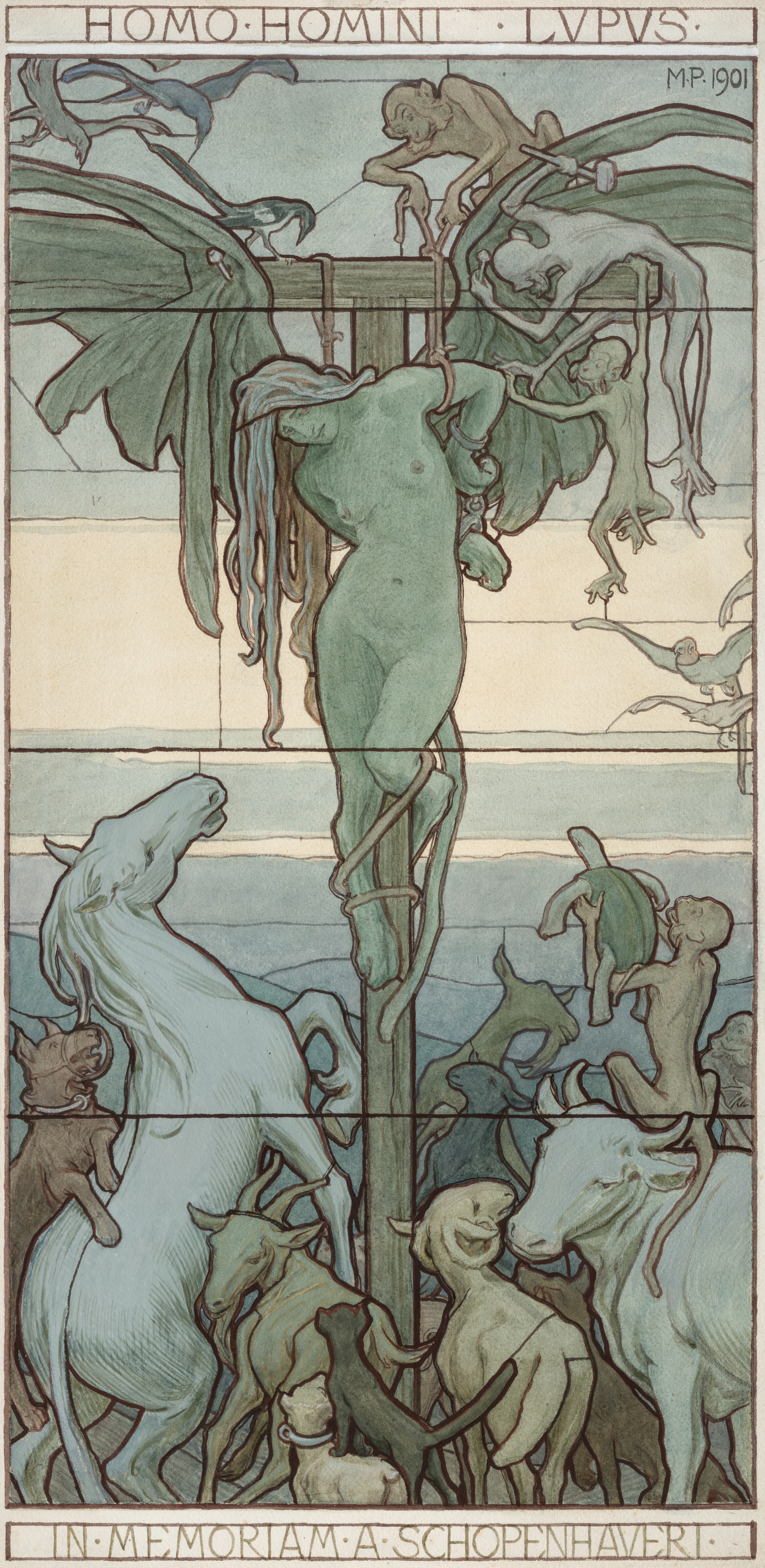
Maximilian Pirner painted Homo homini lupus in 1901. It is an allegorical satire, showing a winged figure, which represents imagination, being crucified by monkeys before a crowd of other beasts.

Homo homini lupus, or in its unabridged form Homo homini lupus est, is a Latin proverb meaning literally 'man is a wolf to man'. It is used to refer to situations where a person has behaved comparably to a wolf. In this case, the wolf represents predatory, cruel, and generally inhuman qualities.

== History ==
A variation of the proverb appeared as line 495 in the play Asinaria by Plautus: "Lupus est homo homini, non homo, quom qualis sit non novit", which has been translated as "Man is no man, but a wolf, to a stranger," or "A man is a wolf rather than a man to another man, when he hasn't yet found out what that man is like."

Seneca the Younger wrote, contrarily, in his Epistulae morales ad Lucilium (specifically, Epistula XCV, paragraph 33), "homo, sacra res homini", which has been translated as "man, an object of reverence in the eyes of man".

Erasmus included the proverb in his Adagia, writing of the variation by Plautus, "Here we are warned not to trust ourselves to an unknown person, but to beware of him as of a wolf".

The philosopher, theologian, and jurist Francisco de Vitoria (in Latin, Franciscus de Victoria) wrote in one of his Relectiones Theologicae that the poet Ovid disagreed with the proverb: "'Man,' says Ovid, 'is not a wolf to his fellow man, but a man.'"

Thomas Hobbes drew upon the proverb in his De Cive, writing in the dedication "To speak impartially, both sayings are very true; That Man to Man is a kind of God; and that Man to Man is an arrant Wolfe. The first is true, if we compare Citizens amongst themselves; and the second, if we compare Cities." Hobbes was describing the tendency of people to act fairly and generously toward other people in the same society and the tendency of societies to act deceptively and violently toward other societies, or as he stated, "In the one, there's some analogy of similitude with the Deity, to wit, Justice and Charity, the twin-sisters of peace: But in the other, Good men must defend themselves by taking to them for a Sanctuary the two daughters of War, Deceit and Violence".

Sigmund Freud agreed with the proverb, writing in his Civilization and Its Discontents, "Men are not gentle creatures, who want to be loved, who at the most can defend themselves if they are attacked; they are, on the contrary, creatures among whose instinctual endowments is to be reckoned a powerful share of aggressiveness. As a result, their neighbor is for them not only a potential helper or sexual object, but also someone who tempts them to satisfy their aggressiveness on him, to exploit his capacity for work without compensation, to use him sexually without his consent, to seize his possessions, to humiliate him, to cause him pain, to torture and to kill him. Homo homini lupus. Who in the face of all his experience of life and of history, will have the courage to dispute this assertion?".

The primatologist and ethologist Frans de Waal disagreed with the proverb, writing that it "contains two major flaws. First, it fails to do justice to canids, which are among the most gregarious and cooperative animals on the planet (Schleidt and Shalter 2003). But even worse, the saying denies the inherently social nature of our own species."

In response to the Johnson–Jeffries riots in the United States in 1910, Russian Zionist activist Ze'ev Jabotinsky wrote of the parallels between racism experienced by African Americans and antisemitism experienced by European Jews, in an article entitled "Homo Homini Lupus".

Bartolomeo Vanzetti, after being convicted of murder, along with Nicola Sacco, in 1927, said that their pending execution would become an emblem "of a cursed past in which man was wolf to the man".

== See also ==
- Aggressionism
- Bellum omnium contra omnes
- Big Bad Wolf
- Misanthropy
- List of Latin phrases
- Wolf in sheep's clothing
- Wolves in folklore, religion and mythology
