= Thoughts for the Times on War and Death =

1915 work by Sigmund Freud

Thoughts for the Time of War and Death
- The German edition
- Author: Sigmund Freud
- Original title: Zeitgemäßes über Krieg und Tod
- Language: German

Thoughts for the Time of War and Death (German: Zeitgemäßes über Krieg und Tod) is a set of twin essays written by Sigmund Freud in 1915, six months after the outbreak of World War I. The essays express discontent and disillusionment with human nature and human society in the aftermath of the hostilities; and generated much interest among lay readers of Freud.

== Disillusionment ==
The first essay addressed the widespread disillusionment brought on by the collapse of the Pax Britannica of the preceding century—what Freud called "the common civilization of peacetime". Freud laments the collapse of the previously held idea that "the great world-dominating nations of white race" had reached a state of civilization that would prevent such continental wars in Europe from occurring. He recalls: "we had expected these people to succeed in discovering another way of settling misunderstandings and conflicts of interest". On this note, Freud also writes extensively about how the war had exposed a phenomenon of "cultural hypocrites"—that is, swaths of people who had been exhibiting certain civilized codes of behavior not out of their own instinctual impulses but out of an egoistic incentive to adhere to societal norms to reap rewards in society. The war had allowed for unrestrained expressions of people's more authentic and primitive impulses. In Freud's view, the war exposed that "there are very many more cultural hypocrites than truly civilized men" and that "in reality our fellow-citizens have not sunk so low as we feared, because they had never risen so high as we believed". Freud further expressed the view that the war had exposed that even intellectuals of a high stature may resort to narrow-minded and illogical conclusions, rooted in "emotional resistance" to logic, when such a situation as that of war arises. He comments that this was as shocking a disillusioning experience as was the decline of moral ethics during the war.

== Discounting death ==
The second essay addressed what Freud called the peacetime "protection racket" whereby the inevitability of death was expunged from civilized mentality. Building on the second essay in Totem and Taboo, Freud argued that such an attitude left civilians in particular unprepared for the stark horror of industrial-scale death in the Great War. The essay ends with Freud suggesting that the "illusion" that saw death hidden from the consciousness was a mistake, as it made the reality of life less easy to bear. He remarks, "We remember the old saying: Si vis pacem, para bellum [if you wish peace, prepare for war.] The times call for a paraphrase: Si vis vitam, para mortam [if you wish life, prepare for death]".

== Influence ==
Freud's account of the centrality of loss in culture has been seen as seminal for his later work, Civilization and its Discontents.

== Translations ==
The Standard Edition of the Complete Psychological Works of Sigmund Freud, translated by James Strachey, titles the work Thoughts for the Times on War and Death, titles the first essay "The Disillusionment of the War" and titles the second essay "Our Attitude Towards Death".

The Authorized English Translation, published by Moffat, Yard and Company, New York, 1918, translated by Dr. A. A. Brill and Alfred B. Kuttner, titles the work Reflections on War and Death, titles the first essay "The Disappointments of War" and titles the second essay "Our Attitude Towards Death".

== See also ==
- Death drive
- Goodbye to All That
- Homo homini lupus
