= On Aphasia =

1891 work on aphasia by Sigmund Freud

On Aphasia: A Critical Study
- First US edition
- Author: Sigmund Freud
- Translator: E. Stengel
- Language: German (1891); English (1953)
- Subject: Aphasia
- Publisher: International Universities Press (1953)
- Publication date: 1891
- English publication date: 1953
- Pages: 105
- ISBN: 9781258005788

On Aphasia is a work on aphasia by Sigmund Freud, the founder of psychoanalysis. The monograph was Freud's first book, published in 1891. In the treatise, Freud challenges the main authorities of the time by asserting that their manner of understanding aphasias was no longer tenable. At the turn of the century, neuroscientists had attempted to localize psychological processes in discrete cortical regions—a position which Freud rejected because neuroscience had very little to offer dynamic psychology on the topic.

In On Aphasia, Freud put forth his earliest thoughts on psychology. Up until that time, Freud had been preoccupied with neurophysiology. The work antedates his writings on psychoanalytic thought. Freud exposed the major fallacy purported by the classical German school of psychology (including writers such as Meynert, Wernicke, Lichtheim) which had held a "localizationist" stance, namely conflating psychological and physiological concepts, specifically on the subject of aphasias.

Because Freud had focused on speech and language loss in this early work, he had a nuanced conception of speech, even speculating on language acquisition. Freud continued to write on the subject, though somewhat briefly, in his work The Unconscious, published in 1915, in Appendix C as Words and Things.

However, Freud and other psychoanalysts who conceived of language acquisition as an aspect of pure brain activity typically overlook the interpersonal, social, and systemic elements of language acquisition and word meaning.

== See also ==
- Sigmund Freud
  - Sigmund Freud bibliography
