= Psychical inertia =

Concept in psychotherapy

Psychical inertia is a term introduced by Carl Jung to describe the psyche's resistance to development and change. He considered it one of the main reasons for the neurotic opposing, or shrinking from, his or her age-appropriate tasks in life.

== Freudian and other developments ==
Freud argued that such psychic inertia played a part in the lives of the normal, as well as of the neurotic, and saw its origins in fixation between early instincts and their first impressions of significant objects. As late as Civilization and its Discontents, he considered as a major obstacle to cultural development "the inertia of the libido, its disinclination to give up an old position for a new one".

Later Jungians have seen psychic inertia as a force of nature reflecting both internal and outer determinants; while others have seen it as a product of social pressures, especially in relation to ageing.

== See also ==
- Death drive
- Psychological imprinting
- Psychosexual development
- Social inertia
