= Death drive =

Concept from Freudian psychoanalytics

In classical psychoanalysis, the death drive (German: Todestrieb) is an aspect of libidinal energy that seeks "to lead organic life back into the inanimate state." For Sigmund Freud, it "express[es] itself— though probably only in part— as a drive of destruction directed against the external world and other organisms", for example, in the behaviour of predation. It complements the life drive, which encompasses self-preservation and reproduction behaviours such as nutrition and sexuality. Both aspects of libido form the common basis of Freud's dual drive theory.

The death drive is not only expressed through instinctive aggression, such as hunting for nourishment, but also through pathological behaviour such as repetition compulsion and self-destructiveness.

Freud proposed the concept of the death and life drives in his work Beyond the Pleasure Principle in 1920. It was developed to solve problems arising from the distinction between the pleasure principle of the id and the reality principle of the ego, with which he was still unable to explain seemingly meaningless or even self-destructive phenomena like recurring dreams of veterans that constantly remind of their war injuries. Freud also proposes that redirection of the death instinct outwards is the source of aggression.

The death drive forms an important part of Freud's psychoanalytic theory, being one of the two fundamental drives that influence behaviour. It is a controversial aspect of Freud's theory, with many later analysts modifying it or outright rejecting it. Later analysts who have accepted the concept have created the concept of mortido and destrudo to provide an analogous term to Eros's libido.

== Terminology ==
Three major terms are used to refer to the same Freudian concept: death drive, death instinct, and Thanatos.

Death drive and death instinct both originate from varying translations of the German words Instinkt (instinct) and Trieb (drive). While Freud typically used the word Trieb when referring to the death drive, the Standard Edition of Freud uses the word "instinct" for both Instinkt and Trieb. (Note: Though the Standard Edition of the Works of Freud translates both Instinkt ("instinct") and Trieb ("drive") as "instinct", Freud actually treats each word as being distinct.) Death instinct and death drive are typically synonymous.

The term Thanatos was coined by Wilhelm Stekel and its use was advocated by Paul Federn. The term is never found in Freud's written works, but according to biographer Ernest Jones, Freud occasionally used the term in conversation when referring to the death drive. The term is a reference to the personification of death from Greek myth, Thanatos, who is used to provide an opposite to the mythological term used to refer to the life drive, Eros. Thanatos is also typically synonymous with death drive.

== Freud ==
=== Origin of the theory ===
Freud arrived at the concept of the death instinct through these observations of repetition compulsion—the tendency of people who have undergone traumatic events to return to their painful experience repeatedly, often in dreams, and children's play. He found the phenomenon of people involuntarily subjecting themselves to disturbing stimuli would be irreconcilable with the pleasure principle (the idea that the mind works to lessen tension within it). While maintaining his theory of the pleasure principle and its regulation by the reality principle, Freud introduced the concept of the death instinct in his 1920 work Beyond the Pleasure Principle. He cites Sabina Spielrein and her paper "Destruction as the Cause of Coming into Being" as a predecessor for his line of thinking. In this work, Freud claims that repetition compulsion has a highly instinctual characteristic and gives the appearance of a "daemonic force at work". From there, he argues that another instinct beside the pleasure principle must be responsible for the phenomena. He claims that all instincts are "an urge inherent in organic life to restore an earlier state of things", and since the earliest state instinct could restore in the state preceding life itself, there must be an instinct that aims to return oneself into inorganic non-existence. He claims that this instinct is used to provide mastery over unpleasant experiences by repeating them in play and dreams. In The Ego and the Id, he states that the death instinct forms a duality within the id alongside Eros. Freud also predicated his notion of the death drive on the "nirvana principle": the fundamental tendency to aim toward reducing all instinctual tension to zero, that is, non-existence. (Note: The difference between the pleasure principle and the nirvana principle is complex due to changes in Freud's conceptions throughout his years of thinking. Put simply, the pleasure principle strives to reduce displeasure/tension, while the nirvana principle strives to end the possibility of tension entirely.)

=== Aggression/aggressive instinct ===
Freud originally held that aggressive impulses could be variously explained by both the sexual and self-preservative instincts. In Beyond the Pleasure Principle, Freud moves away from this belief by claiming that the two primary instincts are the life instinct Eros (which incorporates both the sexual and self-preservative instincts), and the death instinct. Freud believed that the death instinct was aimed toward the self, and that aggression (or the "aggressive instinct") was the death instinct reoriented at the outside world.

The death instinct can be directed outwards as aggression when the ego is disturbed and engages in a defense mechanism such as projection. This is tempered by the super-ego, which redirects that aggression onto the ego itself and creates the feeling of guilt. In childhood, frustration of desires by parents causes aggression towards them, and then results in introjection and identification of this aspect into the super-ego during its formation. To summarize, the death instinct (as a part of the id, like the Eros) is originally oriented at the self, then when oriented outwards as aggression, it is repressed as the super-ego develops, which results in the death instinct being again oriented inwards at the ego.

=== Application to society and civilization ===
...civilization is a process in the service of Eros, whose purpose is to combine single human individuals, and after that families, then races, peoples and nations, into one great unity, the unity of mankind... But man’s natural aggressive instinct, the hostility of each against all and of all against each, opposes this programme of civilization. This aggressive instinct is the derivative and the main representative of the death instinct which we have found alongside Eros and which shares world-dominion with it. And now, I think, the meaning of the evolution of civilization is no longer obscure to us. It must present the struggle between Eros and Death, between the instinct of life arid the instinct of destruction, as it works itself out in the human species.

— Sigmund Freud, Civilization and Its Discontents, (SE, XXI.122)

In Civilization and Its Discontents, Freud discusses the importance of instincts to the structure of civilization, with civilization performing a moderating role which reorients aggression to the outside world onto the self. Freud believed that aggression stemming from the death instinct must be repressed via reaction formation in order for civilization to exist. In the process of civilization, Freud places the death instinct behind Eros in visibility and importance, stating it is only detected when "alloyed with Eros".

=== Philosophical connections to Schopenhauer ===
From a philosophical perspective, the death drive may be viewed in relation to the work of the German philosopher Arthur Schopenhauer. In The World as Will and Representation, he postulates that all exists by a metaphysical "will" (more clearly, a will to live), and that pleasure affirms this will. Schopenhauer's pessimism led him to believe that the affirmation of the "will" was a negative and immoral thing, due to his belief of life producing more suffering than happiness. The death drive would seem to manifest as a natural and psychological negation of the "will".

Freud was well aware of such possible linkages. In a letter of 1919, he wrote that regarding "the theme of death, [that I] have stumbled onto an odd idea via the drives and must now read all sorts of things that belong to it, for instance Schopenhauer". Ernest Jones (who like many analysts was not convinced of the need for the death drive, over and above an instinct of aggression) considered that "Freud seemed to have landed in the position of Schopenhauer, who taught that 'death is the goal of life'".

However, as Freud put it to the imagined auditors of his New Introductory Lectures (1932), "You may perhaps shrug your shoulders and say: "That isn't natural science, it's Schopenhauer's philosophy!" But, ladies and gentlemen, why should not a bold thinker have guessed something that is afterwards confirmed by sober and painstaking detailed research?" He then went on to add that "what we are saying is not even genuine Schopenhauer....we are not overlooking the fact that there is life as well as death. We recognise two basic instincts and give each of them its own aim".

== Analytic reception ==
The concept of the death drive has been controversial. Freud acknowledged this, saying "the assumption of the existence of an instinct of death or destruction has met with resistance even in analytic circles". Ernest Jones would comment of Beyond the Pleasure Principle that the book not only "displayed a boldness of speculation that was unique in all his writings" but was "further noteworthy in being the only one of Freud's which has received little acceptance on the part of his followers". Salman Akhtar writes in the Comprehensive Dictionary of Psychoanalysis that "with the exception of Melanie Klein, her followers, and Kurt Eissler, most subsequent analysts laid the postulate of death instinct to rest."

Otto Fenichel in his compendious survey of the first Freudian half-century concluded that "the facts on which Freud based his concept of a death instinct in no way necessitate the assumption ... of a genuine self-destructive instinct". Heinz Hartmann set the tone for ego psychology when he "chose to ... do without 'Freud's other, mainly biologically oriented set of hypotheses of the "life" and "death instincts"'". In the object relations theory, among the independent group, the most common repudiation was the loathsome notion of the death instinct'.

=== Melanie Klein ===
Melanie Klein and her immediate followers considered that "the infant is exposed from birth to the anxiety stirred up by the inborn polarity of instincts—the immediate conflict between the life instinct and the death instinct"; and her followers built much of their theory of early childhood around the outward deflection of the latter. The former vice-president of the International Psychoanalytical Association, Hanna Segal, writes "This deflection of the death instinct, described by Freud, in Melanie Klein's view consists partly of a projection, partly of the conversion of the death instinct into aggression".

=== Jacques Lacan ===
French psychoanalyst Jacques Lacan castigated the "refusal to accept this culminating point of Freud's doctrine ... by those who conduct their analysis on the basis of a conception of the ego ... that death instinct whose enigma Freud propounded for us at the height of his experience". Characteristically, Lacan stressed the linguistic aspects of the death drive: "the symbol is substituted for death in order to take possession of the first swelling of life .... There is therefore no further need to have recourse to the outworn notion of primordial masochism in order to understand the reason for the repetitive games in ... his Fort! and in his Da!."

=== Other reactions ===
Eric Berne too would proudly proclaim that he, "besides having repeated and confirmed the conventional observations of Freud, also believes right down the line with him concerning the death instinct, and the pervasiveness of the repetition compulsion".

Freud's conceptual opposition of death and Eros drives in the human psyche was applied by Walter A. Davis in Deracination: Historicity, Hiroshima, and the Tragic Imperative and Death's Dream Kingdom: The American Psyche since 9/11. Davis described social reactions to both Hiroshima and 9/11 from the Freudian viewpoint of the death force. Unless they consciously take responsibility for the damage of those reactions, Davis claims that Americans will repeat them.

== Mortido and destrudo ==
The terms mortido and destrudo (though both rejected by Freud), formed analogously to libido and refer to the energy of the death instinct. In the 21st century, their use among Freudian psychoanalysts has been waning, but still designate destructive energy. The importance of integrating mortido into an individual's life, as opposed to splitting it off and disowning it, has been taken up by figures like Robert Bly in the men's movement.

Paul Federn used the term mortido for the new energy source, and has generally been followed in that by other analytic writers. His disciple and collaborator Weiss, however, chose destrudo, which was later taken up by Charles Brenner.

Mortido has also been applied in contemporary expositions of the Kabbalah.

Literary criticism has been almost more prepared than psychoanalysis to make at least metaphorical use of the term 'Destrudo'. Artistic images were seen by Joseph Campbell in terms of "incestuous 'libido' and patricidal 'destrudo'"; while literary descriptions of the conflict between destrudo and libido are still fairly widespread in the 21st century.

=== Paul Federn ===
Mortido was introduced by Freud's pupil Paul Federn to cover the psychic energy of the death instinct, something left open by Freud himself: Providing what he saw as clinical proof of the reality of the death instinct in 1930, Federn reported on the self-destructive tendencies of severely melancholic patients as evidence of what he would later call inwardly-directed mortido.

=== Edoardo Weiss ===
Destrudo is a term introduced by Italian psychoanalyst Edoardo Weiss in 1935 to denote the energy of the death instinct, on the analogy of libido—and thus to cover the energy of the destructive impulse in Freudian psychology.

Destrudo is the opposite of libido—the urge to create, an energy that arises from the Eros (or "life") drive—and is the urge to destroy arising from Thanatos (death), and thus an aspect of what Sigmund Freud termed "the aggressive instincts, whose aim is destruction".

Weiss related aggression/destrudo to secondary narcissism, something generally only described in terms of the libido turning towards the self.

=== Eric Berne ===
Eric Berne, who was a pupil of Federn's, made extensive use of the term mortido in his pre-transactional analysis study, The Mind in Action (1947). As he wrote in the foreword to the third edition of 1967, "the historical events of the last thirty years...become much clearer by introducing Paul Federn's concept of mortido".

Berne saw mortido as activating such forces as hate and cruelty, blinding anger and social hostilities; and considered that inwardly directed mortido underlay the phenomena of guilt and self-punishment, as well as their clinical exacerbations in the form of depression or melancholia.

Berne saw sexual acts as gratifying mortido at the same time as libido; and recognised that on occasion the former becomes more important sexually than the latter, as in sadomasochism and destructive emotional relationships.

Berne's concern with the role of mortido in individuals and groups, social formations and nations, arguably continued throughout all his later writings.

=== Jean Laplanche ===
Jean Laplanche has explored repeatedly the question of mortido, and of how far a distinctive instinct of destruction can be identified in parallel to the forces of libido.

== See also ==
- Aggression
- Cupio dissolvi
- Group conflict
- Id resistance
- L'appel du vide
- Karl Menninger
- Psychical inertia
- Suicide
- The Scorpion and the Frog
- Thoughts for the Times on War and Death
- Useless machine
