= Reality principle =

Ability of the mind to assess the reality of the external world, and to act upon it

In Freudian psychology and psychoanalysis, the reality principle (German: Realitätsprinzip) is the ability of the mind to assess the reality of the external world, and to act upon it accordingly, as opposed to acting according to the pleasure principle. The reality principle is the governing principle of the actions taken by the ego, after its slow development from a "pleasure-ego" into a "reality-ego".

== History ==
Freud argued that "an ego thus educated has become 'reasonable'; it no longer lets itself be governed by the pleasure principle, but obeys the reality principle, which also, at bottom, seeks to obtain pleasure, but pleasure which is assured through taking account of reality, even though it is pleasure postponed and diminished".

In his introductory lectures of 1915, at the University of Vienna, Freud popularized the concept of the unconscious as the largest and most influential part of the mind, including those drives, instincts and motives humans are often forced to deny except in disguised form. In the 23rd lecture, Freud discussed the conflict between the realm of "Phantasy" and the reality principle, comparing the former to a nature reserve. He argued however that "there is a path that leads back from phantasy to reality - the path, that is, of art".

Jonathan Lear has argued that there was in fact an ethical dimension to Freud's concept of the reality principle, in that it was opposed to a neurotically distorted world-view.

== Development ==
In infancy and early childhood, the Id governs behavior predominantly by obeying the pleasure principle. Maturity is the slow process of learning to endure the pain of deferred gratification as and when reality requires it – a process Freud saw as fostered by education and educators. The result is the mature mind's ability to avoid instant gratification in favor of long-term satisfaction.

In order to do so, the reality principle does not ignore the id, but strives instead to satisfy its desires in balanced and socially appropriate ways, through awareness of and adjustment to environmental demands. The manner in which it moderates the pleasure principle and assures satisfaction of instinctual needs is by weighing the costs and benefits of an action before deciding to act upon or ignore an impulse. The reality principle forces the mind to consider the risks, requirements and outcomes of various decisions. The ego does not strive to eradicate urges, but instead it temporarily halts the discharge of the id's energy until a more suitable, safe and realistic time and place can be found. This necessary process of delay is accomplished through the so-called secondary process.

An example of the reality principle at work is a person who is dieting, but chooses not to give into hunger cravings. He or she knows that satisfying their unhealthy cravings, and thus satisfying the pleasure principle, provides only short-term empty satisfaction that thwarts the objective of the diet.

== Neurotic rebellion and fantasy ==
Rebellion against the constraints of the reality principle, in favour of a belief in infantile omnipotence, appears as a feature of all neurotic behavior - something perhaps seen most overtly in the actions of gamblers.

Psychosis can be seen as the result of the suspension of the reality principle, while sleep and dreaming offer a 'normal' everyday example of its decommissioning.

Susan Isaacs argued however that reality thinking in fact depended on the support of fantasy, rather than being opposed to it. Jacques Lacan similarly maintained that the field of reality required the support of the imaginary world of fantasy for its maintenance. Even the ego psychologists have come to see the perception of reality as taking place through the medium of a greater or lesser veil of infantile fantasy.

== Consolidation of the reality principle ==
The reality principle increases its scope in the wake of puberty, expanding the range and maturity of the choices the individual makes. Adolescents are no longer children who must succumb to every need, but must balance what is pleasurable with what is real, even if maintaining this balance happens to be disagreeable.

A further change in the reality principle from adolescence to adulthood can be a critical transition in its consolidation; but the impact of certain traumatic experiences may prove to be detrimental from within the unconscious. In the new reality principle, the individual must find themselves to be represented as a strong presence within their own mind and making reasoned decisions, instead of being merely perceived. It is the culmination of the way in which an adolescent learns to experience oneself in the context of their external reality.

== Vs. pleasure principle ==
Both the reality principle and pleasure principle pursue personal gratification, but the crucial difference between the two is that the reality principle is more focused on the long-term and is more goal-oriented while the pleasure principle disregards everything except for the immediate fulfillment of its desires.

=== The pleasure principle ===
The reality principle and pleasure principle are two competing concepts established by Freud. The pleasure principle is the psychoanalytic concept based on the pleasure drive of the id in which people seek pleasure and avoid suffering in order to satisfy their biological and psychological needs. As people mature, the id's pleasure-seeking is modified by the reality principle. As it succeeds in establishing its dominance as a regulatory principle over the id, the search for satisfaction does not take the most direct routes, but instead postpones attainment of its goal in accordance with conditions imposed by the outside world, or in other words, deferred gratification. These two concepts can be viewed in psychological terms or processes, with the pleasure principle being considered the primary process that is moderated by the secondary process, or the reality principle. From an economic standpoint, the reality principle corresponds to a transformation of free energy into bound energy.

==== Impulse control ====
Freud defines impulses as products of two competing forces: the pleasure principle and the reality principle. These two forces clash because impulses encourage action without any premeditated thought or deliberation and little regard to consequences, compromising the role of the reality principle. Impulses are often difficult for the mind to overcome because they hold anticipated pleasurable experiences. Freud emphasizes the importance of the development of impulse control because it is socially necessary and human civilization would fail without it. If an individual lacks sufficient impulse control, it represents a defect of repression that may lead to severe psychosocial problems (Kipnis 1971; Reich 1925; Winshie 1977).

=== Development of the reality principle ===
The ability to control impulses and delay gratification is one of the hallmarks of a mature personality and the result of a thriving reality principle. Throughout childhood, children learn how to control their urges and behave in ways that are socially appropriate. Researchers have found that children who are better at delaying gratification may have better defined egos, because they tend to be more concerned with things such as social appropriateness and responsibility. Most adults have developed the capacity for the reality principle in their ego. They have learned to override the constant and immediate gratification demands of the id.

In human development, the transition in dominance from the pleasure principle to the reality principle is one of the most important advances in the development of the ego. The transition is rarely smooth and can lead to interpersonal conflict and ambivalence. If the reality principle fails to develop, a different dynamic takes its place. The super-ego asserts its authority, inflicting guilt on the individual because they do not have the ability to placate both reason and pleasure. The ego becomes trapped in between the "should" of the id and the "should not" of the superego. A person who lives as a slave to their immediate desires and consistently feels regret and guilt afterwards will lead an unhappy and persistently unfulfilled existence. It is not hard to find examples of adults who live this way, such as the alcoholic who drinks then feels guilty for doing so and they go on to perpetuate the vicious cycle.

==== Split ego ====
At the failure of the ego to embrace its developing role within the reality principle, it remains under the control of the pleasure principle. This results in a split ego, a condition in which the two principles clash much more severely than when under the temptation of an impulse. The control of the pleasure principle persists as strongly as it does because as the child's self-representation begins to differentiate from the object representation of the mother, they begin to experience depression at the loss of what the mother provides. Yet, at the same time the mother continues to encourage such behavior in the child instead of allowing them to mature. This behavior enforces clinging and denial which promotes the persistence of the pleasure principle in an attempt to avoid the pain of separation or subsequent depression. The pleasure principle denies the reality of separation of mother and child while the reality principle still attempts to pursue it. This path of development creates a break between the growing child's feelings and the reality of his or her behavior as they enter the real world.

=== Strengthening the reality principle ===
From a Freudian standpoint, one means of strengthening the reality principle within the ego would be to attain control over the id. Through maturity and a better sense of self, individuals can find the strength to gradually develop the reality principle and learn to defer pleasure by making more rational and controlled choices. In a traditional psychoanalytic model, this could take several years of restraint, and even so, many people will make the choice to achieve instant gratification over delayed gratification.

== See also ==
- Reality Testing
- Deferred gratification
- Id, ego, and super-ego
- Ignacio Matte Blanco
- Pierre Janet
- Self-control
