= Jokes and Their Relation to the Unconscious =

Book by Sigmund Freud

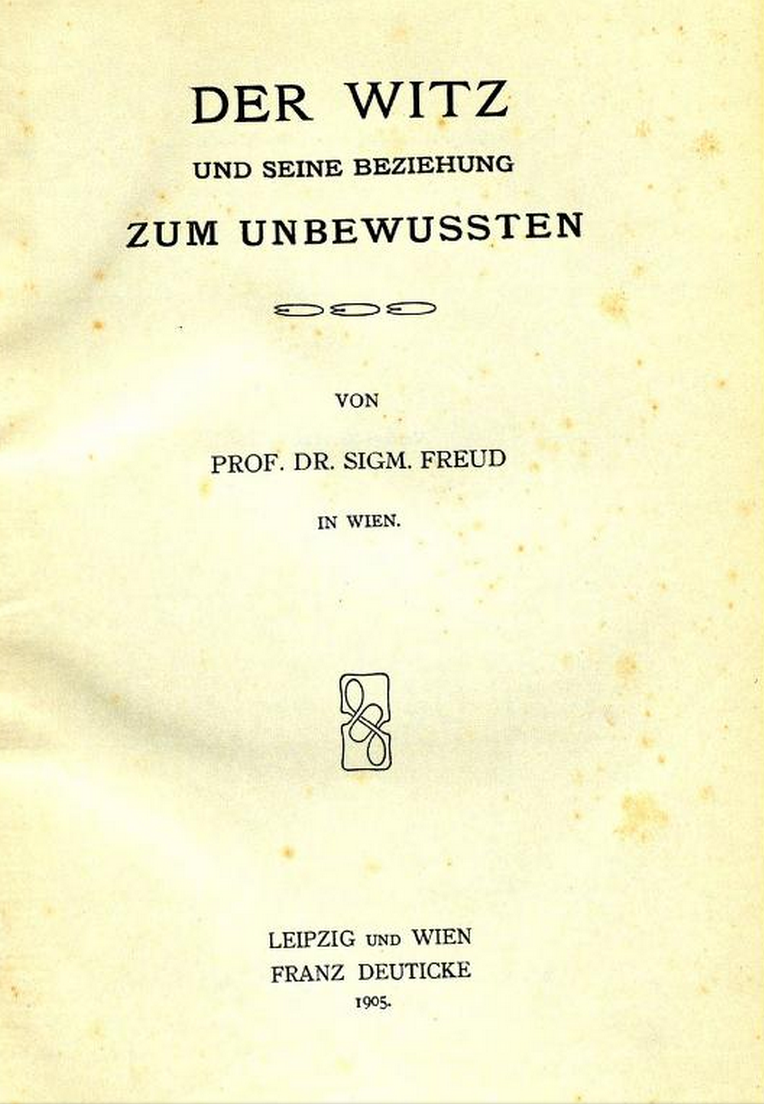
- Jokes and Their Relation to the Unconscious
- Author: Sigmund Freud
- Original title: German: Der Witz und seine Beziehung zum Unbewußten
- Translator: James Strachey
- Language: German (1905); English (1960)
- Subjects: Psychoanalysis; Jokes; Humor
- Publisher: F. Deuticke
- Publication date: 1905
- Publication place: Germany and Austria (1905); United States (1960)
- English publication date: 1960
- Media type: Print

Jokes and Their Relation to the Unconscious (German: Der Witz und seine Beziehung zum Unbewußten) is a 1905 book on the psychoanalysis of jokes and humour by Sigmund Freud, the founder of psychoanalysis. It was published in German in 1905. The book's title in English is in accordance with the 1960 translation by James Strachey. In some other English translations the work is titled The Joke and Its Relation to the Unconscious or Wit and Its Relation to the Unconscious. In the work, Freud describes the psychological processes and techniques of jokes, which he compares to the processes and techniques of dreamwork and the unconscious. He assesses prior studies on jokes and establishes a characterization of jokes. Freud links these characteristics to psychodynamics and his understanding of the unconscious mind while reconciling new theoretic insights with his 1899 book The Interpretation of Dreams.

== Context ==
Analysis on elements and functions of laughter and humor date back to Ancient Greece (384 BCE to 322 BCE) and Roman empire (106—43 B.C.E). Most notably, Plato, Aristotle, and Cicero formulated early theories on the function of humor and laughter and paved the way for further philosophers such as Thomas Hobbes (17th century) to expand their positions. Psychological and philosophical analyses of jokes were made by Jean Paul, Theodor Lipps, Theodor Vischer, and Kuno Fischer (19th to 20th century). Most of these analysis reconcile the joke with humor.

After publishing The Interpretation of Dreams in 1900, Freud started to work on seminal texts and the refinement of his theories. During the establishment of the book, Sigmund Freud additionally worked on two other literary works, including Bruchstück einer Hysterieanalyse (Fragment of a hysteria analysis), also known as the case of Dora, and Drei Abhandlungen der Sexualtheorie (Three treatises on sexual theory). These texts showcase an extension of The Interpretation of Dreams and the introduction of sexual motives into his theory. Jokes and Its Relation to the Unconscious similarly advances Freud's theoretical basis and introduces a development "von der Nachtseite der Träume auf die seelische Wachexistenz", meaning "from the night side of dreams to the waking existence of the soul", according to Peter-André Alt.

During the establishment of this book and other works Freud kept contact to friends such as Willhelm Fließ via the exchange of letters. It is hypothesized that within this discourse Fließ provoked the establishment of the book by criticizing Freud's theoretical basis of The Interpretation of Dreams. These comments mainly condemn that there are apparent jokes within dreams. Due to this critique, Freud strongly connected his theoretical knowledge of dreams with the term "Witzarbeit", translating to jokework within the first part of his book. "Eine so weitgehende Übereinstimmung wie die zwischen den Mitteln der Witzarbeit und denen der Traumarbeit wird kaum eine zufällige sein." ("A correspondence as far-reaching as that between the means of jokework and those of dreamwork can hardly be accidental.")

== Contents ==
Freud claims that "our enjoyment of the joke" indicates what is being repressed in more serious talk. Freud argues that the success of the joke depends upon a psychic economy, whereby the joke allows one to overcome inhibitions.

According to Freud, understanding of joke technique is essential for understanding jokes and their relation to the unconscious; however, these techniques are what make a joke a joke. Freud also noted that the listener laughing really heartily at the joke will typically not be in the mood for investigating its technique.

== Structure ==
The book is segmented into three parts: analytic, synthetic, and theoretic.

=== Introduction ===
Freud begins by referring to earlier works of philosophers Jean Paul, Theodor Vischer, Kuno Fischer, and Theodor Lipps. He notes that his aim is to form a more conclusive theory on jokes independent of humor, thereby expanding the understanding of these authors. He suggests that these are distributed pieces which he will "zu einem Organischem Ganzen zusammenführen", reuniting them into an organic whole.

=== Analytic part ===
Within this part Freud introduces the techniques and tendencies of the joke, elaborating them by introducing a joke and subsequently explaining the mechanism which the joke applies. Freud works out condensation (for example in the contraction of words, when ‘familiär’ and ‘millionaire’ are combined to form ‘famillionär’), as a central techniques of jokes. This includes information about mixed word formation, modification, the use of identical (word) material, rearrangements, simple modifications and others. The double meaning in wordplay is another central technique. This technique includes metaphorical and factual meaning, as well as ambiguity among others.

After elaborating on the techniques of the joke, Freud describes the jokes relation to the central human tendencies of love and the expression of aggression. He suggests that especially within tendentious joke, the joke allows for people's primal instincts and tendencies to be addressed. He hypothesizes that a satisfaction of these instincts takes place while an obstacle is apparent. This obstacle can be seen as a restriction to live out the presented instincts because of societal conventions. If this obstacle can be overcome by the joke, it allows for a source of pleasure to be accessed, which could not otherwise be reached.

=== Synthetic part ===
Within the synthetic part Freud focuses on the exact mechanism of derived pleasure, as well as motives of the joke. After this, the joke as a societal process is discussed. These insights are based upon the hypothesized working of derived pleasure described before. He elaborates that a gain of lust or pleasure is established, when somebody is the recipient but not when somebody is telling the joke. The part telling the joke needs to exert psychic energy that the recipient gains from removing the inhibition or obstacle. Hence, the one telling the joke cannot laugh about their own joke, according to Freud.

=== Theoretical part ===
In the concluding chapter of his book Freud explores how wit relates to dreams and the unconscious. He suggests that a preconscious thought is briefly processed by the unconscious and then immediately recognized by the conscious mind. This allows individuals to revert to a childlike psychic state where reality's constraints are minimal, as evidenced by the fact that children do not engage in joke creation.

Freud broadens his analysis to include comedy and humor, summarizing that the pleasure derived from wit, comedy, and humor comes from mental economy—saving effort in inhibition, presentation, and emotion, respectively. These forms of pleasure represent methods to regain joy from mental activities that was lost during development. The euphoria aimed for through these mechanisms mirrors the carefree mental state of childhood, a time when people did not need humor or wit to feel happy.

== Reception ==
The book was published in 1905 in Austria and Germany and translated into English in 1960 by James Strachey, intended to reach a bigger audience. The translated version was then published in the United States by F. Deuticke in 1960. Further additions to the German original include a version with an introduction by Peter Gay published in 1992 by Fischer. In 2002 Joyce Crick again translated the work into English and published it with an Introduction written by James Strachey. This version was published on June 24, 2003.

As described by Lippman (1962), the book seems to be rather complex rendering its content difficult for a broader audience. Within popular culture the book found resonance in Woody Allen's movie Annie Hall ("Stadtneurotiker") from 1977. According to a film critique by Sam B. Girgus, the film discusses themes of psychoanalysis, not only through references to the book and Freud's work but through the entire story line binding together to form an expression of narrative desire pathing a way to the unconscious. Despite the lack of public appreciation, the book proved significant in changing the scientific inquiry of humor. Scholars recognized Freud's contribution to understanding cognitive and emotional dimensions of humor and leveraged the theoretical basis for further scientific inquiry.

During the 1940s, Hans Jürgen Eysenck criticized Freud's understanding and elaborated on a cognitive approach to the study of humor. In 1971, Paul Mc Ghee elaborated on humor within children focussing on the development of humor according to Piaget's developmental stages. Similarly interested to Freud in child-like humor, Mc Ghee extended Incongruity theory rather than supporting Freud's understanding of freed inhibition. During the same year, George W. Kelling derived four hypothesis from Freud's elaboration, which he tested empirically using comics with varying content. In this research, Freud's theory was able to explain the findings presented within this investigation, constituting an empirical basis for the claims made within the literature. Psychologist Herbert Lefcourt used elements of freed inhibition, most notably relief, within his theory on humor in stress and coping mechanisms. Though both theories inherit an understanding of relief, they differ in important ways, mainly that Freud based his acceptance of Lipps's theory of mental economy whereas Lefcourt focuses on stress regulation.

After the publishing of the book, Freud dedicated himself to the topic of jokes and humor with another article called Humor that he wrote in 1928. This article entailed a new analysis of the function of humor in light of advances in Freud's theory.

== In popular culture ==
The book is mentioned in Adventure Time episode "Blenanas", season 10, episode 9. Princess Bubblegum gives Finn a copy of the book and says she does not have time to explain the psychology of humor to him. The title shown in the episode is "Der Witz Und Seine Beziehung Zum Unter Bewussten."

== See also ==
- Humour in Freud
- Sigmund Freud bibliography
