= A Note upon the 'Mystic Writing-Pad' =

Essay by Sigmund Freud

A Note upon the 'Mystic Writing-Pad' (German: Notiz über den „Wunderblock“) is a 1925 essay by Sigmund Freud.

== Summary ==
Freud uses the simple device as a metaphor for the Mind.
