= Civilization and Its Discontents =

1930 book by Sigmund Freud

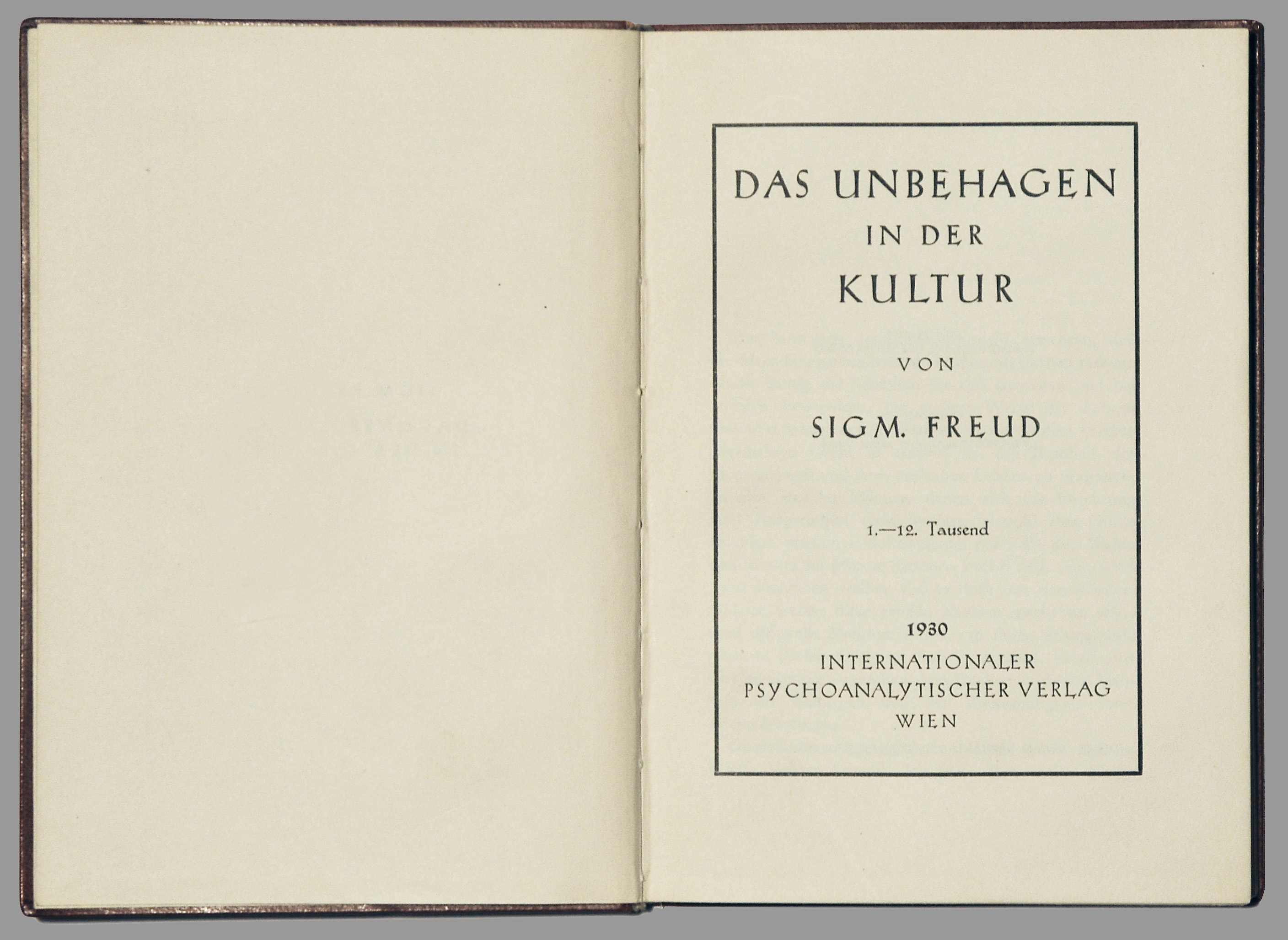
- 1930s title page German edition
- Author: Sigmund Freud
- Original title: Das Unbehagen in der Kultur
- Translator: Joan Riviere; James Strachey
- Language: German
- Subject: Philosophy of culture, social psychology, political philosophy
- Publisher: Internationaler Psychoanalytischer Verlag Wien
- Publication date: 1930
- Publication place: Austria
- Media type: Print
- Pages: 127
- ISBN: 978-0-393-30158-8
- Preceded by: The Future of an Illusion
- Followed by: Moses and Monotheism

Civilization and Its Discontents is a book by Sigmund Freud, the founder of psychoanalysis. It was written in 1929 and first published in German in 1930 as Das Unbehagen in der Kultur ("The Uneasiness in Culture").

Exploring what Freud saw as a clash between the desire for individuality and the expectations of society, the book is considered one of Freud's most important and widely read works, and was described in 1989 by historian Peter Gay as one of the most influential and studied books in the field of modern psychology.

== Overview ==
In Civilization and Its Discontents, Freud theorized the fundamental tensions between civilization and the individual; his theory is grounded in the notion that humans have certain characteristic instincts that are immutable. The primary tension originates from an individual attempting to find instinctive freedom, and civilization's contrary demand for conformity and repression of instincts. Freud states that when any situation that is desired by the pleasure principle is prolonged, it creates a feeling of mild resentment as it clashes with the reality principle.

Primitive instincts—for example, the desire to kill and the insatiable craving for sexual gratification—are harmful to the collective wellbeing of a human community. Laws that prohibit violence, murder, rape and adultery were developed over the course of history as a result of recognition of their harm, implementing severe punishments if their rules are broken. This process, argued Freud, is an inherent quality of civilization that gives rise to perpetual feelings of discontent among individuals, justifying neither the individual nor civilization.

== Synopsis ==
Freud begins this work by taking up a possible source of religious feeling that his previous book, The Future of an Illusion, overlooked: the "oceanic feeling" of wholeness, limitlessness, and eternity. Freud himself cannot experience this feeling of dissolution, but notes there exist different pathological and healthy states (e.g. love) where the boundary between ego and object is lost, blurred, or distorted. Freud categorizes the oceanic feeling as being a regression into an earlier state of consciousness—before the ego had differentiated itself from the world of objects. The need for this religious feeling, he writes, arises out of "the infant's helplessness and the longing for the father," as there is no greater infantile need than a father's protection. Freud "imagine[s] that the oceanic feeling became connected with religion later on" in cultural practices.

The second chapter delves into how religion is one coping strategy that arises out of a need for the individual to distance himself from all of the suffering in the world. The ego of the child forms over the oceanic feeling when it grasps that there are negative aspects of reality from which it would prefer to distance itself. But at the same time as the ego is hoping to avoid displeasure, it is also building itself so that it may be better able to act towards securing happiness, and these are the twin aims of the pleasure principle when the ego realizes that it must also deal with 'reality'. Freud claims that the 'purpose of life is simply the programme of the pleasure principle' and the rest of the chapter is an exploration of various styles of adaptation that humans use to secure happiness from the world while also trying to limit their exposure to suffering or avoid it altogether. Freud points out three main sources of displeasure that we attempt to master: our own painful and mortal existence, the cruel and destructive aspects of the natural world, and the suffering endemic to the reality that we must live with other human beings in a society. Freud regards this last source of displeasure as "perhaps more painful to us than any other", and the remainder of this book will extrapolate on the conflict between the individual's instinct for seeking gratification and the reality of societal life.

The third chapter of the book addresses a fundamental paradox of civilization: it is a tool we have created to protect ourselves from unhappiness, and yet it is our largest source of unhappiness. People become neurotic because they cannot tolerate the frustration which society imposes in the service of its cultural ideals. Freud points out that advances in science and technology have been, at best, a mixed blessing for human happiness. He asks what society is for if not to satisfy the pleasure principle, but concedes that as well as pursuing happiness, civilization must also compromise happiness in order to fulfill its primary goal of bringing individuals into peaceful relationship with one another, which it does by making them subject to a higher, communal authority. Civilization is built out of wish-fulfillments of the human ideals of control, beauty, hygiene, order, and especially for the exercise of humanity's highest intellectual functions. Freud draws a key analogy between the development of civilization and libidinal development in the individual, which allows Freud to speak of civilization in his own terms: there is anal eroticism that develops into a need for order and cleanliness, a sublimation of instincts into useful actions, alongside a more repressive renunciation of instinct. This final point Freud sees as the most important character of civilization, and if it is not compensated for, then “one can be certain that serious disorders will ensue.". The structure of civilization serves to circumvent the natural processes and feelings of human development and eroticism. It is no wonder then, that this repression could lead to discontent among civilians.

In the fourth chapter, Freud attempts a conjecture on the developmental history of civilization, which he supposes coincided with man learning to stand upright. This stage is followed by Freud's hypothesis from Totem and Taboo that human culture is bound up in an ancient Oedipal drama of brothers banding together to kill their father, and then creating a culture of rules to mediate ambivalent instinctual desires. Gradually, love of a single sexual object becomes diffused and distributed towards all of one's culture and humanity in the form of a diluted 'aim-inhibited affection'. Freud discounts the idea that this passive and non-judgmental affection for all is the pinnacle of human love and purpose. Freud notes that while love is essential for bringing people together in a civilization, at the same time society creates laws, restrictions, and taboos to try to suppress this same instinct, and Freud wonders if there may not be more than sexual desire within the term 'libido'.

"Psycho-analytic work has shown us that it is precisely these frustrations of sexual life which people known as neurotics cannot tolerate". So Freud begins the fifth section of this work, which explores the reasons why love cannot be the answer, and concludes that there exists a genuine and irreducible aggressive drive within all human beings. And while the love instinct (eros) can be commandeered by society to bind its members together, the aggressive instinct runs counter to this tendency and must either be repressed or be directed against a rival culture. Thus, Freud acknowledges there is irrevocable ill-will within the hearts of man, and that civilization primarily exists to curb and restrain these impulses.

In the sixth chapter, Freud reviews the development of his concept of libido to explain why it must now be separated into two distinct instincts: the object-instinct of eros and the ego-instinct of thanatos. This 'new' concept of the death drive actually has a long developmental history in Freud's writings, including his investigations into narcissism and sadomasochism. Freud admits it may be difficult to accept his view of human nature as being predisposed towards death and destruction, but he reasons that the suppression of this instinct is the true cause behind civilization's need for restrictions. Life and civilization, then, are born and develop out of an eternal struggle between these two interpersonal forces of love and hate.

Freud begins the seventh chapter by clearly explaining how the repression of the death instinct gives rise to neurosis in the individual: the natural aggressiveness of the human child is suppressed by society (and its local representative, the father-figure) and turned inward, introjected, directed back against the ego. These aggressive energies develop into the super-ego as conscience, which punishes the ego both for transgressions committed (remorse) but also for sins it has only fantasized about (guilt). All individuals must submit themselves to forming these feelings of guilt, for their aggressive instincts must be repressed if they hope to share in the love which civilized society has appropriated for its members. Guilt and the neurotic repression of instinct are simply the price we pay in order to live together harmoniously in families and communities.

The guilty conscience is the price paid by the individual to belong to civilized society, but often this guilt is left unconscious and is experienced as anxiety or 'discontent'. Freud also considers that in addition to the individual super-ego, there may exist a 'cultural super-ego' that sets itself up as a conscience for society, and that his recommendation for it is the same as his recommendation for many of his neurotic patients: that it must lower its demands on the frail ego. Freud concludes this book by expanding on his distinction between eros and thanatos: "When an instinctual trend undergoes repression, its libidinal elements are turned into symptoms, and its aggressive components into a sense of guilt", and he ponders on how the eternal battle between these heavenly powers will play out in mankind.

== Historical context ==
This work should be understood in the context of contemporary events: World War I undoubtedly influenced Freud and his central observation about the tension between the individual and civilization, as could be seen in his 1915 work Thoughts for the Times on War and Death. In a nation still recovering from a particularly brutal war, Freud developed thoughts published two years earlier in The Future of an Illusion (1927), wherein he criticized organized religion as a collective neurosis.

Freud, an avowed atheist, argued that religion has tamed asocial instincts and created a sense of community around a shared set of beliefs, thus helping a civilization. Yet at the same time, organized religion exacts an enormous psychological cost on the individual by making him or her perpetually subordinate to the primal father figure embodied by God. To that same point, Freud's view of men as power-hungry aggressors was also undoubtedly shaped by his experience in Europe during the Great War and its aftermath.

== See also ==
- Death drive
- Narcissism of small differences (in Civilization and Its Discontents)
- Psychical inertia
- Psychoanalytic sociology
- Sublimation (psychology)
- Thoughts for the Times on War and Death
- Eros and Civilization
