= Ignacio Matte Blanco =

Chilean psychiatrist

- Born: 3 October 1908; Santiago, Chile
- Died: 11 January 1995 (aged 86); Rome, Italy
- Citizenship: Italian
- Education: University of Chile
- Known for: Bi-logic: application of Logic to psychoanalysis
- Spouses: Andrea Baker; Luciana Bon de Matte
- Children: 7
- Scientific career
- Fields: Psychiatry, Psychoanalysis, Symbolic Logic
- Workplaces: Maudsley Hospital, British Psychoanalytical Society, Johns Hopkins University, Duke University, Chilean Society of Psychoanalysts, Istituto di Psicoanalisi di Roma, University of the Sacred Heart, Rome

Ignacio Matte Blanco (3 October 1908 – 11 January 1995) was a Chilean psychiatrist and psychoanalyst who developed a logic-based explanation for the operation of the unconscious, and for the non-logical aspects of experience. In applying the complexity and paradoxes of mathematical logic to psychoanalysis, he pioneered a coherent way of understanding the clinical situation. He has an international following that includes physicists, mathematicians, cyber-scientists, psychologists, mathematical philosophers, neuroscientists, theologians, linguistics and literary scholars.

== Life ==
Matte Blanco was born in Santiago, Chile. He was educated in Chile and qualified there as a medical doctor. He entered psychoanalysis with Fernando Allende Navarro, Latin America's first qualified psychoanalyst. Having moved to London in 1933, he trained in psychiatry at South London's Maudsley Hospital and in psychoanalysis at the British Psychoanalytical Society where he was supervised by Anna Freud and James Strachey, becoming a member of the British Society in 1938. He subsequently worked in the United States, from 1940. He returned to Chile in 1943 where he co-founded the Psychoanalytic Society. In 1966 he travelled to Italy, never to return to his homeland. He settled in Rome with his family. He died there at the age of 86.

== The unconscious ==
Matte Blanco argues that in the unconscious "a part can represent the whole" and that "past, present, and future are all the same"'. He set out to examine the five characteristics of the unconscious that Freud had outlined: timelessness, displacement, condensation, replacement of external by internal reality, and absence of mutual contradiction. Matte Blanco hypothesized the nature of unconscious logic, as opposed to conscious logic. He deduced that if the unconscious has consistent characteristics it must follow rules, or there would be chaos. However the nature of these hypothetical characteristics indicates that their rules differ from conventional logic.

In his work The Unconscious as Infinite Sets, Matte Blanco proposes that the structure of the unconscious can be summarised by the principles of Generalisation and of Symmetry: 1) The principle of Generalization: here logic does not take account of individuals as such, it deals with them only as members of classes, and of classes of classes. 2) The principle of Symmetry: here the logic treats the converse of any relation as identical to it; that is, it deals with relationships as symmetrical'.

While the principle of Generalisation might be compatible with conventional logic, discontinuity is introduced by the principle of Symmetry under which relationships are treated as symmetrical, or reversible. Whereas asymmetrical thinking distinguishes individuals from one another by the relationship between them, reality testing, symmetrical thinking, by contrast, sees relations as holding indiscriminately across a field of individuals. For example, an asymmetrical relationship, X is greater than Y, becomes reversible so that Y is simultaneously greater and smaller than X. Matte Blanco draws here on Klein's understanding that "I am angry (with a person or thing)" as very close to "Someone or something is very angry with me"; and indeed he suggests that Klein was the most creative and original of all those who have drawn inspiration from Freud, highlighting in particular her famous concept of projective identification.

For Matte Blanco, "unconsciousness" is marked by symmetry, where there is a tendency towards 'sameness' and likewise, an implicit aversion to 'difference', while the quality of ego-functioning registers and bears difference, in a sense he called asymmetry .

== The symmetrical and the asymmetrical ==
Matte Blanco divided the unconscious into two modes of being: the symmetrical and the asymmetrical. Asymmetrical relations are relations that are non reversible. For example, “Jack reads the newspaper” cannot be reversed to the newspaper reading Jack. In this way, asymmetrical relations are logical relations and underlie everyday logic and common sense. They govern the conscious sphere of the human mind. Symmetrical relations, on the other hand, move in both directions simultaneously. For example, 'Daniel sits on a stone' can be reversed as, 'a stone sits on Daniel', without being untrue. Symmetrical relations, govern the unconscious mind. Matte Blanco states that the symmetrical, unconscious realm is the natural state of man and is a massive and infinite presence while the asymmetrical, conscious realm is a small product of it. This is why the principle of symmetry is all-encompassing and can dissolve all logic, leading to the asymmetrical relations perfectly symmetrical.

To show the illogical nature of symmetry, Matte Blanco said: "In the thought system of symmetry, time does not exist. An event that occurred yesterday can also occur today or tomorrow. Traumatic events of the past are not only seen in the unconscious as ever present and permanently happening but also about to happen." He said that "We are always, in a given mental product, confronted by a mixture of the logic of the unconscious with that of the preconscious and consciousness". Matte Blanco gives this mixture of two logics the name bi-logic and points out that our thinking is usually bi-logical, expressing the both types of logic to differing extents.

== Strata ==
Matte Blanco saw in-depth analysis of the mind as falling into five broad strata: in which there is a particular combination of symmetrical and asymmetrical logic' appropriate to each one. In what he terms the first stratum, experience is characterized by the conscious awareness of separate objects. At this level thinking is mostly delimited and asymmetrical — closest to "normal", everyday life, to what W. R. Bion termed the mind of the "work group"...anchored to a sophisticated and rational level of behaviour. A second stratum can be defined by the appearance of a significant amount of symmetrization within otherwise asymmetrical thinking, so that for example a man in love will attribute to the beloved young woman...all the characteristics of the class of beloved woman, but (bi-logically) he will realize that his young woman also has limitations and defects.

The next deeper, third stratum is one where different classes are identified (thus containing a fair amount of asymmetrical thinking) but in which...parts of a class are always taken as the whole class — symmetrization (plus a degree of timelessness). The fourth stratum is defined by the fact that there is formation of wider classes which are also symmetrized, while asymmetry becomes less and less. Thus because "being a man" is a wider class than ones men, women and children, being a man is also equivalent to being a woman and a child. In this fourth and rather deep stratum, a number of the features of the Freudian unconscious are also characteristic. There is an absence of contradiction, also an identity of psychical and external reality. Finally, the deepest, fifth stratum is that in which processes of symmetrization tend towards the mathematical limit of indivisibility thinking, which requires asymmetrical relations, is greatly impaired and becomes the realm of psychotic functioning: without asymmetrical logic, play breaks down into delusion.

Normal human development for Matte Blanco, involved gradual familiarity with all five strata, including the capacity both to differentiate and to move between them all; in abnormal states, this continuity of differentiation between the strata becomes fractured or confused.

Thus, asymmetrical thoughts are said to be at the surface, while the symmetrical relations make up multiple lower strata that go deeper until an “invisible mode” or total symmetry is reached. In the deeper, completely unconscious levels, a statement such as “Jane is the mother of Jasmine” is equally valid as “Jasmine is the mother of Jane”. This statement reversal sounds preposterous to logical, asymmetrical, conscious thought, but the depth of the unconscious has its own rules. There, such a statement is true and incontestable. In this way, the principle of symmetry changes the asymmetrical to symmetrical or, put another way, the logical into the illogical.

== Influence ==
Matte Blanco hoped that his logical underpinning of the unconscious would contribute to development in other areas of knowledge, apart from psychoanalysis. There are applications in theology. Other applications can be found in art and literature. A number of writers have explored parallels between the work of Matte Blanco and of Gregory Bateson including Margaret Arden, Horacio Etchegoyen and Jorge L. Ahumada. Papers by Arden, Etchegoyen and Ahumada are summarized in Rayner. More contemporary applications may be found in the area of Cognitive informatics.

An International Bi-logic Conference was held every other year: in August 2016 it was held in London.

== Bibliography ==
- Lo psíquico y la naturaleza humana: Hacia un planteamiento experimental. Ediciones de la Universidad de Chile, Santiago de Chile, 1954.
- Estudios de psicología dinámica. Ediciones de la Universidad de Chile, 1955.
- Thinking, Feeling and Being. Routledge, London 1988, ISBN 978-0-415-00678-1
- The Unconscious as Infinite Sets. An Essay in Bi-logic. Dukworth, London 1975

== See also ==
- Claudio Naranjo
- Infinite set
