= The Future of an Illusion =

1927 book by Sigmund Freud

- Author: Sigmund Freud
- Original title: Die Zukunft einer Illusion
- Translator: (1) W.D. Robson-Scott, (2) James Strachey
- Subject: Religion
- Publisher: (1) Hogarth Press, London (2) W. W. Norton & Company
- Publication date: 1927
- English publication date: (1) 1928 (2) 1989
- Media type: Print
- ISBN: 978-0-393-00831-9
- OCLC: 20479722

The Future of an Illusion (German: Die Zukunft einer Illusion) is a 1927 work by Sigmund Freud, the founder of psychoanalysis, in which Freud discusses religion's origins, development, and its future. He provides a psychoanalysis of religion as a false belief system.

== Summary ==
Freud defines religion as an illusion, consisting of "certain dogmas, assertions about facts and conditions of external and internal reality which tells one something that one has not oneself discovered, and which claim that one should give them credence." Religious concepts are transmitted in three ways and thereby claim our belief. "Firstly because our primal ancestors already believed them; secondly, because we possess proofs which have been handed down to us from antiquity, and thirdly because it is forbidden to raise the question of their authenticity at all." Psychologically speaking, these beliefs present the phenomena of wish fulfillment, "fulfillments of the oldest, strongest, and most urgent wishes of mankind." (Ch. 6 pg.38).

Among these are the necessity to cling to the existence of the father, the prolongation of earthly existence by a future life, and the immortality of the human soul. To differentiate between an illusion and an error, Freud lists scientific beliefs such as "Aristotle's belief that vermin are developed out of dung" (pg.39) as errors, but "the assertion made by certain nationalists that the Indo-Germanic race is the only one capable of civilization" is an illusion, simply because of the wishing involved. Put forth more explicitly, "what is characteristic of illusions is that they are derived from human wishes." (pg. 39)

Freud adds, however, that, "Illusions need not necessarily be false." (pg.39) He gives the example of a middle-class girl having the illusion that a prince will marry her. While this is unlikely, it is not impossible. Its grounding in her wishes is what makes it an illusion.

Freud explains religion in a similar term to that of totemism. The individual is essentially an enemy of society and has instinctual urges that must be restrained to help society function. "Among these instinctual wishes are those of incest, cannibalism, and lust for killing." (pg. 10)

Freud's view of human nature is that it is anti-social, rebellious, and has high sexual and destructive tendencies. The destructive nature of humans sets a pre-inclination for disaster when humans must interact with others in society. "For masses are lazy and unintelligent; they have no love for instinctual renunciation, and they are not to be convinced by argument of its inevitability; and the individuals composing them support one another in giving free rein to their indiscipline." (pg. 7)

So destructive is human nature, he claims, that "it is only through the influence of individuals who can set an example and whom masses recognize as their leaders that they can be induced to perform the work and undergo the renunciations on which the existence of civilization depends." (pg. 8) All this sets a terribly hostile society that could implode if it were not for civilizing forces and developing government.

Freud elaborates further on the development of religion, as the emphasis on acquisition of wealth and the satisfaction of instinctual drives (sex, wealth, glory, happiness, immortality) moves from "the material to the mental." As compensation for good behaviors, religion promises a reward.

In Freud's view, religion is an outshoot of the Oedipus complex, and represents man's helplessness in the world, having to face the ultimate fate of death, the struggle of civilization, and the forces of nature. He views God as a manifestation of a childlike "longing for [a] father." (pg. 18)

Freud's description of religious belief as a form of illusion is based on the idea that it is derived from human wishes with no basis in reality. He says, "Thus we call a belief an illusion when a wish-fulfillment is a prominent factor in its motivation, and in doing so we disregard its relations to reality, just as the illusion itself sets no store by verification."

In Freud's words "The gods retain the threefold task: they must exorcise the terrors of nature, they must reconcile men to the cruelty of Fate, particularly as it is shown in death, and they must compensate them for the sufferings and privations which a civilized life in common has imposed on them." (pg. 19)

== Reception ==
Freud sent a copy of The Future of an Illusion to his friend Romain Rolland. While Rolland generally agreed with Freud's assessment of religion, he questioned whether Freud had discovered the true source of religious sentiment, which he ascribed to an "oceanic" feeling. The psychiatrist Carl Jung, the founder of analytical psychology, wrote that The Future of an Illusion "gives the best possible account" of Freud's earlier views, "which move within the confines of the outmoded rationalism and scientific materialism of the late nineteenth century." The critic Harold Bloom calls The Future of an Illusion "one of the great failures of religious criticism." Bloom believes that Freud underestimated religion and was therefore unable to criticize it effectively. Today, some scholars see Freud's arguments as a manifestation of the genetic fallacy, in which a belief is considered false or inverifiable based on its origin.

== See also ==
- Psychology of religion
- Sigmund Freud's views on religion
