= "Civilized" Sexual Morality and Modern Nervous Illness =

1908 article by Sigmund Freud

"Civilized" Sexual Morality and Modern Nervous Illness (German: Die „kulturelle“ Sexualmoral und die moderne Nervösität) is an article published by Sigmund Freud in 1908, in the journal Sexual-Probleme ("Sexual Problems").

Referencing Christian von Ehrenfels' distinction between cultural and natural sexual morality, Freud explains the etiological significance of cultural sexual morality as a reason for neurosis. At the beginning, Freud states that cultural sexual mores impose constraints on the individual, which can cause damage to the person, which in turn threatens the culture as a whole. While von Ehrenfels argues primarily on the basis of Social Darwinism, saying social sexual morality may prevent male sexual selection in reproduction, Freud focuses on the consequences of socially-imposed repression of the sexual instinct as a cause of neurosis.

Culture is based on renunciation of drives. There is therefore a tension between a person's body, which seeks fulfilment of drives, and the demands of culture to renounce desire. Those who cannot conform to these requirements imposed by society are either viewed as criminals and perverts - if they cannot fulfil society's demand for renunciation - or escape into neurosis when the drives are suppressed to such an extent that neurotic substitute pleasures are developed in their stead. Neurosis is thus the negative counterpart of perversion, "because they [neurotics] have the same appetites as the positive perverts in a 'repressed' state."

Freud said that the "perverse" part of the libido is caused by a disturbance in development. The libido was originally meant for deriving pleasure, not only at the genitals but also at other erogenous zones; but education has the purpose of limiting autoeroticism and directing love towards objects other than oneself, finally achieving the "primacy of genitals put into the service of procreation". Thus Freud was one of the first people who said that sexuality by itself does not generate any internal conflict, and explained that the conflict arises only through interaction with the outside world, with its social norms and its expectation of repression of instincts, which leads to disease (repression thesis). The suppressed perverse drives are ideally channeled through sublimation and harnessed for cultural work. The sex drive in humans is aperiodic and is divorced from reproduction. Therefore, it can be metonymically shifted and applied to other areas. Thus, culture benefits to a great extent - and is even dependent - on sexual energy that is redirected through sublimation. Therefore, Freud concluded that a complete renunciation of the sex drive is detrimental to culture. Abstinence only produces "brave weaklings", but not great thinkers with bold ideas. Freud thus describes the dilemma of culture, which simultaneously calls for renunciation while still needing the sexual instinct to preserve itself. The repression model that imposes cultural sexual morality should therefore be abandoned in favor of a sublimation, displacement, and distribution model of sexual energies.
