= Primal scene =

Fantasy by a child of a sex act between parents

In psychoanalysis, the primal scene (German: Urszene) is the theory of the initial unconscious fantasy of a child of a sex act, between the parents, that organises the psychosexual development of that child.

The expression "primal scene" refers to the sight of sexual relations between the parents, as observed, constructed, or fantasized by the child and interpreted by the child as a scene of violence. The theory suggests that the scene is not understood by the child, remaining enigmatic but at the same time provoking sexual excitement.

== Freud's views ==
=== Evolution ===
The term appeared for the first time in Freud's published work apropos of the "Wolf Man" case (1918b [1914]), but the notion of a sexual memory experienced too early to have been translated into verbal images, and thus liable to return in the form of conversion symptoms or obsessions, was part of his thinking as early as 1896 [as witnessed in his letter of May 30 of that year to Wilhelm Fliess, where he evokes a "surplus of sexuality" that "impedes translation" (1950a, pp. 229–230)]. Here Freud is already close to the model of the trauma and its "deferred" effect. The following year, in his letter to Fliess of May 2, Freud uses the actual term Urszene for the first time; and gives the approximate age when in his estimation children were liable to "hear things" that they would understand only "subsequently" as six or seven months (SE 1, p. 247). The subject of the child's witnessing parental coitus came up as well, albeit in an older child, with the case of "Katharina," in the Studies on Hysteria (1895d), and Freud evoked it yet again in The Interpretation of Dreams, with the fantasy of the young man who dreamed of watching his parents copulating during his life in the womb (1900a [addition of 1909], pp. 399–400).

=== Fantasy or reality? ===
Freud persistently strove to decide whether the primal scene was a fantasy or something actually witnessed; above all, he placed increasing emphasis on the child's own fantasy interpretation of the scene as violence visited upon the mother by the father. He went so far, in "On the Sexual Theories of Children" (1908c, p. 221), as to find a measure of justification for what he called the "sadistic concept of coitus", suggesting that, though the child may exaggerate, the perception of a real repugnance towards sexual intercourse on the part of a mother fearful of another pregnancy may be quite accurate. In the case of "Little Hans," however, the violence was explained in terms of a prohibition: Hans deemed it analogous to "smashing a window-pane or forcing a way into an enclosed space" (1909b, p. 41).

The case history of the Wolf Man gave Freud the opportunity not only to pursue the issue of the reality of the primal scene, but also to propose the idea that it lay at the root of childhood (and later adult) neurosis: the sexual development of the child was "positively splintered up by it" (1918b [1914), pp. 43–44). In his Introductory Lectures, however, he argued for the universality of the fantasy of the primal scene (like the sexual theories of children): it may be encountered in all neurotics, if not in every human being (Freud, 1915f), and it belongs in the category of "primal" fantasies. It appears, however, not to have the same force for all individuals. Freud would later assign a central place to the primal scene in his analysis of Marie Bonaparte, although in her case the scene took place between her nanny and a groom (Bonaparte, 1950–53).

Looked upon as an actual event rather than as a pure fantasy reconstructed in a retrospective way (as with Carl Jung's zurückphantasieren), the primal scene had a much more marked traumatic impact, and this led Freud to insist on the "reality" of such scenes, thus returning to the debate over event-driven (or "historical") reality versus psychic reality. Beyond the issue of the scene itself, however, it was the whole subject of fantasy that was thus raised (in chapter five of the Wolf Man case-history [1918b, pp. 48–60]), discussed in terms that would be picked up by Freud again later in Constructions in Analysis (1937d).

It was not merely, in Freud's view, that the technique of psychoanalysis demanded that fantasies be treated as realities so as to give their evocation all the force they needed, but also that many "real" scenes were not accessible by way of recollection, but solely by way of dreams. Whether a scene was constructed out of elements observed elsewhere and in a different context (for example, animal coitus transposed to the parents); reconstituted on the basis of clues (such as bloodstained sheets); or indeed observed directly, but at an age when the child still had not the corresponding verbal images at its disposal; did not fundamentally alter the basic facts of the matter: "I intend on this occasion," wrote Freud, "to close the discussion of the reality of the primal scene with a non liquet" (1918b, p. 60).

== Kleinian interpretations ==
Melanie Klein's view of the primal scene differed from Freud's, for where Freud saw an enigmatic perception of violence, she saw the child's projective fantasies. Klein considered that a child's curiosity was first provoked by the primal scene, and that typically the child felt both excited and excluded by the primal scene. The sexual relationship between the parents, fantasized as continuous, is also the basis of the "combined-parent figure", mother and father seen as locked in mutual (but excluding) gratification.

Where Klein laid emphasis on the way the infant projected hostile and destructive tendencies onto the primal scene, with the mother pictured therein as just as dangerous for the father as the father is for her, later Kleinians like John Steiner have stressed the creative aspect of the primal scene; and the necessity in analysis of overcoming a splitting of its image between a loving couple on the one hand, and a combined parent figure locked in hate.

== General characteristics ==
The primal scene is inseparable from the sexual theories of childhood that it serves to create. This disturbing representation, which at once acknowledges and denies the familiar quality of the parents, excludes the child even as it concerns them, as witness the libidinal excitement the child feels in response. Otto Fenichel has stressed the traumatic nature of the excess excitement felt by the child, which they are unable to process — what he called the "overwhelming unknown".

The particularity of the primal scene lies in the fact that the subject experiences in a simultaneous and contradictory way the emergence of the unknown within a familiar world, to which they are bound by vital needs, by expectations of pleasure, and by the self-image that it reflects back to them. The lack of common measure between the child's emotional and psychosexual experience and the words that could give an account of the primal scene creates a gulf that the sexual theories of childhood attempt to bridge. A sadistic reading of the scene combines the child's curiosity about both the origin and the end of life in a representation in which death and life are indeed fused.

Ph.D. dissertations on primal scene began to appear since 1970s. M.F. Hoyt's Ph.D. dissertation entitled 'The primal scene: A study of fantasy and perception regarding parental sexuality' was submitted to the Yale University. Based on the approximately 400 college student samples, Hoyt inferred that approximately 20% of respondents reported actually witnessing (by sight and/or sound) their parents engaging in sexual relations. The conclusion of this study indicated that primal scene experience per se is not necessarily deleterious; the traumatic or pathogenic effects usually occur only within the context of general brutality or disturbed family relations. A segment of Paul Okami's doctoral dissertation to the University of California Los Angeles in 1990s, was published in the Journal of Sex Research in 1995.

== Other claims to phrase "primal scene" ==
=== Intertextual readings ===
Ned Lukacher has proposed using the term in literary criticism to refer to a kind of intertextuality in which the ability to interpret one text depends on the meaning of another text. It is "the interpretive impasse that arises when a reader has good reason to believe that the meaning of one text is historically dependent on the meaning of another text or on a previously unnoticed set of criteria, even though there is no conclusive evidential or archival means of establishing the case beyond a reasonable doubt."

== Cultural examples ==
- Maynard Solomon interprets four recorded dreams of Beethoven as all being centered on the primal scene, with the composer either as participant or as impotent by-stander.

== See also ==
- Father complex
- Karl Abraham
- Primal father
