= Father complex =

Personality trait in psychology

Father complex in psychoanalysis is a complex—a group of unconscious associations, or strong unconscious impulses—which specifically pertains to the image or archetype of the father. These impulses may be either positive (admiring and seeking out older father figures) or negative (distrusting or fearful).

Sigmund Freud, and psychoanalysts after him, saw the father complex, and in particular ambivalent feelings for the father on the part of the male child, as an aspect of the Oedipus complex. By contrast, Carl Jung took the view that both males and females could have a father complex, which in turn might be either positive or negative.

== Freud and Jung ==
=== Shared understanding ===
Use of the term father complex emerged from the fruitful collaboration of Freud and Jung during the first decade of the twentieth century—the time when Freud wrote of neurotics "that, as Jung has expressed it, they fall ill of the same complexes against which we normal people struggle as well".

In 1909, Freud made "The Father Complex and the Solution of the Rat Idea" the centrepiece of his study of the Rat Man; Freud saw a reactivation of childhood struggles against paternal authority as standing at the heart of the Rat Man's latter-day compulsions. In 1911, Freud wrote that "in the case of Schreber we find ourselves once again on the familiar ground of the father-complex"; a year earlier, Freud had argued that the father complex—fear, defiance, and disbelief of the father—formed in male patients the most important resistances to his treatment.

The father complex also stood at the conceptual core of Totem and Taboo (1912-3). Even after the break with Jung, when "complex" became a term to be handled with care among Freudians, the father complex remained important in Freud's theorizing in the twenties;—for example, it appeared prominently in The Future of an Illusion (1927). Others in Freud's circle wrote freely of the complex's ambivalent nature. However, by 1946, and Otto Fenichel's compendious summary of the first psychoanalytic half-century, the father complex tended to be subsumed under the broader scope of the Oedipus complex as a whole.

After the Freud/Jung split, Jung had equally continued to use the father complex to illuminate father/son relations, such as in the case of the father-dependent patient who Jung termed "a fils a papa" (regarding him, Jung wrote "[h]is father is still too much the guarantor of his existence"), or when Jung noted how a positive father complex could produce an over-readiness to believe in authority. However, Jung and his followers were equally prepared to use the concept to explain female psychology, such as when a negatively charged father complex made a woman feel that all men were likely to be uncooperative, judgmental, and harsh in the same image.

=== Freud/Jung split ===
Freud and Jung both used the father complex as a tool to illuminate their own personal relations. For example, as their early intimacy deepened, Jung had written to Freud asking him to "let me enjoy your friendship not as that of equals but as that of father and son". In retrospect, however, both Jungians and Freudians would note how Jung was impelled to question Freud's theories in a way that pointed to the existence of a negative father complex beneath the positive one—beneath his chosen and overt stance of the favorite son.

It is perhaps no surprise that the complex ultimately led to and fuelled conflicts between the pair, with Jung accusing Freud of "treating your pupils like patients...Meanwhile you are sitting pretty on top, as father". In his efforts to struggle free from his psychoanalytic father figure, Jung would reject the term "father complex" as Viennese name calling—despite his own use of it in the past to illuminate precisely such situations.

== Postmodernism: the absent father ==
Whereas the idea of the father complex had originally evolved to deal with the heavy Victorian patriarch, by the new millennium there had developed instead a postmodern preoccupation with the loss of paternal authority—the absence of the father. Alongside the shift from a Freudian emphasis on the role of the father to object relations theory's stress upon the mother, what psychoanalysis tended to single out was the search for the father, and the negative effects of the switched-off father.

It has even been suggested from a French perspective that the expression is almost completely absent from contemporary psychoanalysis. Although post-Lacanians certainly continue to debate the idea of the "Vatercomplex", a postmodern dictionary of psychoanalysis is nonetheless more likely to have an entry instead for James M. Herzog's (1980) term "Father hunger": the son's longing for and need of contact with a father figure.

However, Jungians such as Erich Neumann continued to use the concept of the father complex to explore the father/son relationship and its implications for issues of authority, noting on the one hand how a premature identification with the father, foreclosing the generational struggle, could lead to a thoughtless conservatism, whereas on the other the perennial rebel against the father complex is found in the archetype of the eternal son. They also applied a similar analysis to a woman with a negative father complex, for whom resistance to a man's suggestions and male authority can become endemic.

=== Father hunger ===
Eating disorders expert Margo D. Maine used the concept of "father hunger" in her book Fathers, Daughters and Food (Nov 1991), with particular emphasis on the relationship with the daughter. Such father hunger, as prompted by paternal absence, may leave the daughter with an unhealthy kind of narcissism, and with a prevalent search for external sources of self-esteem. Maine further examined the longing that all children have for connection with fathers, and how an unmet father hunger influences disordered eating and other mental illnesses.

In contemporary psychoanalytic theory, James M. Herzog's Father Hunger: Explorations with Adults and Children addresses the unconscious longing experienced by many males and females for an involved father. Also, the importance of fatherly provisions for both sons and daughters during their respective developmental stages is examined in the writings of Michael J. Diamond (see My Father Before Me, WW Norton, 2007).

Jungians have emphasised the power of parent hunger, forcing one repeatedly to seek out unactualised parts of the father archetype in the outside world. One answer men have been offered is to move into generativity; to find the lost father within themselves, the internal father, and hand him on to their successors, thereby shifting from demanding parental guidance to providing it.

== Cultural examples ==
The notion of the "Father complex" still flourishes in the culture at large. For example, Czesław Miłosz wrote of Albert Einstein, "everything about him appealed to my father complex, my yearning for a protector and leader".

Bob Dylan's choice of pseudonym has been linked to the father complex, as a rejection of his actual father and his paternal name. After that choice, however, he would seek out a series of father figures, or "idols" as he called them, to act as father confessor, before leaving each one behind again in turn.

However, English novelist D. H. Lawrence dismissed the idea of the father complex as applied to himself, calling it a fool's complex.

== See also ==
- Criminals from a sense of guilt
- Deferred obedience
- Electra complex
- Father absence
- Name of the Father
- Oedipus complex
- Primal scene
- "The real McCoy"
