= Deferred obedience =

Freudian psychological archetype

Deferred obedience is a psychological phenomenon first articulated by Sigmund Freud, whereby a onetime rebel becomes subservient to the very rules and standards against which they had previously been rebelling.

== To father figures ==
Deferred obedience was linked by Freud to the effects of repression, with especial reference to the father complex. In the case of the Rat Man, Freud described the different phases of his complex attitude towards his father: "As long as his father was alive it showed itself in unmitigated rebelliousness and open discord, but immediately after his death it took the form of a neurosis based on abject submission and deferred obedience to him".

In Totem and Taboo Freud generalised the principle to the cultural sphere, arguing that the basis of the social bond underpinning civilisation was equally rooted in deferred obedience to the authority of the father. It was no contradiction, but rather a confirmation, of the theory to see outbreaks of Carnival-like licence as occasions when the controls of deferred obedience were temporarily lifted.

== To the mother/parents ==
In a later development of the idea, Jacqueline Rose would speak of "deferred obedience to the mother, as the return of the (cultural) repressed". The death of the parents would seem to reinforce, rather than weaken, the force of their commands, and so often to precipitate deferred obedience.

== See also ==
- Afterwardsness
- Jacques Derrida
- Some Character-Types Met with in Psycho-Analytic Work
