= Little Arpad =

Psychological case study

Little Arpad [Bandi, 'Rooster Man'] is the name given to a case history of a child with a rooster identification and fetish by the psychoanalyst Sandor Ferenczi.

== Observation ==
In his article of 1913 in the International Journal of Psycho-Analysis, “A Little Chant'cleer”, Ferenczi reported on the case of a child, attacked by a rooster, who subsequently took on the role of a rooster wherever possible, in an early example of identification with the aggressor. He either imitated directly, or spoke only about, roosters; and played solely with toy roosters.

== Freud's use ==
Freud used the example of Little Arpad, along with that of Little Hans, to support his theory of the father as totem in his 1913 book Totem and Taboo. He would later be criticised by Peter Gay for neglecting the at least equally strong evidence concerning Arpad's view of his mother: “One should put my mother into a pot and cook her, then there would be a preserved mother and I could eat her”.

== Choice of songs ==
Arpad's choice of songs to sing was also determined by his rooster-fetish – supporting Freud's theory as expressed in his 1901 work The Psychopathology of Everyday Life.

== See also ==
- Ambivalence
- Claude Lévi-Strauss
- Counterphobic attitude
- Vamik Volkan
- Wolfman
