= Eugen Maximilian Reisz =

Eugen Maximilian Reisz (9 September 1879 – 14 August 1957) was an Austrian-American electrical engineer and inventor. He is best known for co-developing the Lieben–Reisz vacuum tube and for inventing the Reisz microphone (also known as the marble block microphone), one of the earliest high-quality carbon microphones used in broadcasting.

== Life and work ==
Reisz was born in Budapest in 1879. He moved to Vienna as a child and studied electrical engineering at the Vienna University of Technology, graduating in 1902. In Vienna he worked with the physicist Robert von Lieben and the electrical engineer Siegmund Strauss in a laboratory concerned with electrical amplification. The work of Lieben, Reisz and Strauss contributed to the development of the Lieben tube, a gas-filled amplifying device and was subsequently developed for practical applications in Germany.

== Reisz microphone ==
Reisz subsequently worked in Berlin on electroacoustic equipment and established the Apparatebau- und Vertriebsgesellschaft System Reisz GmbH. The company employed Georg Neumann, who had previously worked under Reisz at the Kabelwerke Oberspree.

== Gallery ==
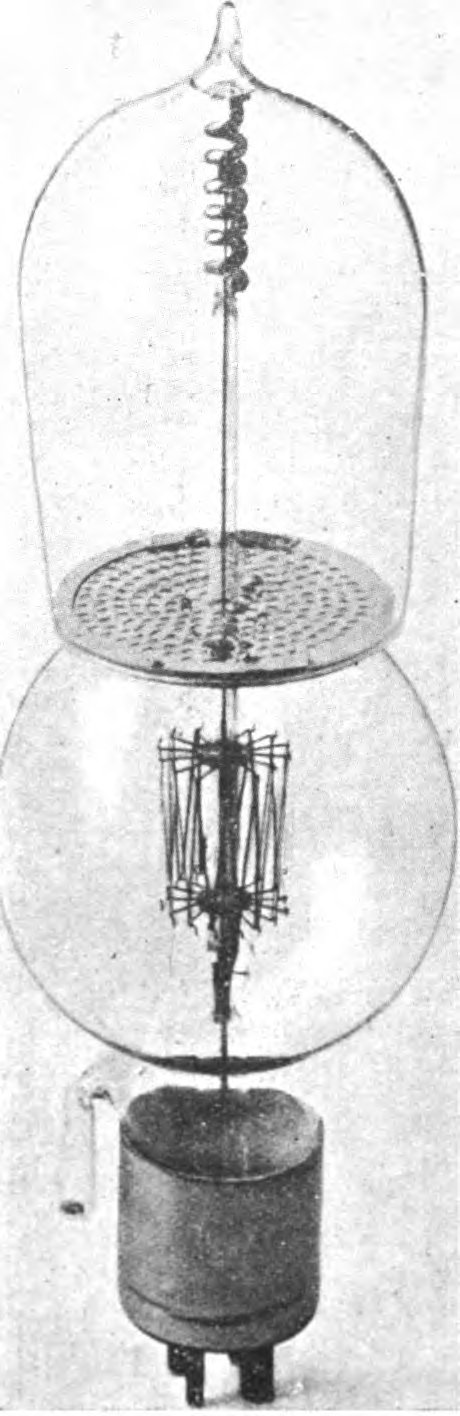
Lieben-Reisz vacuum tube

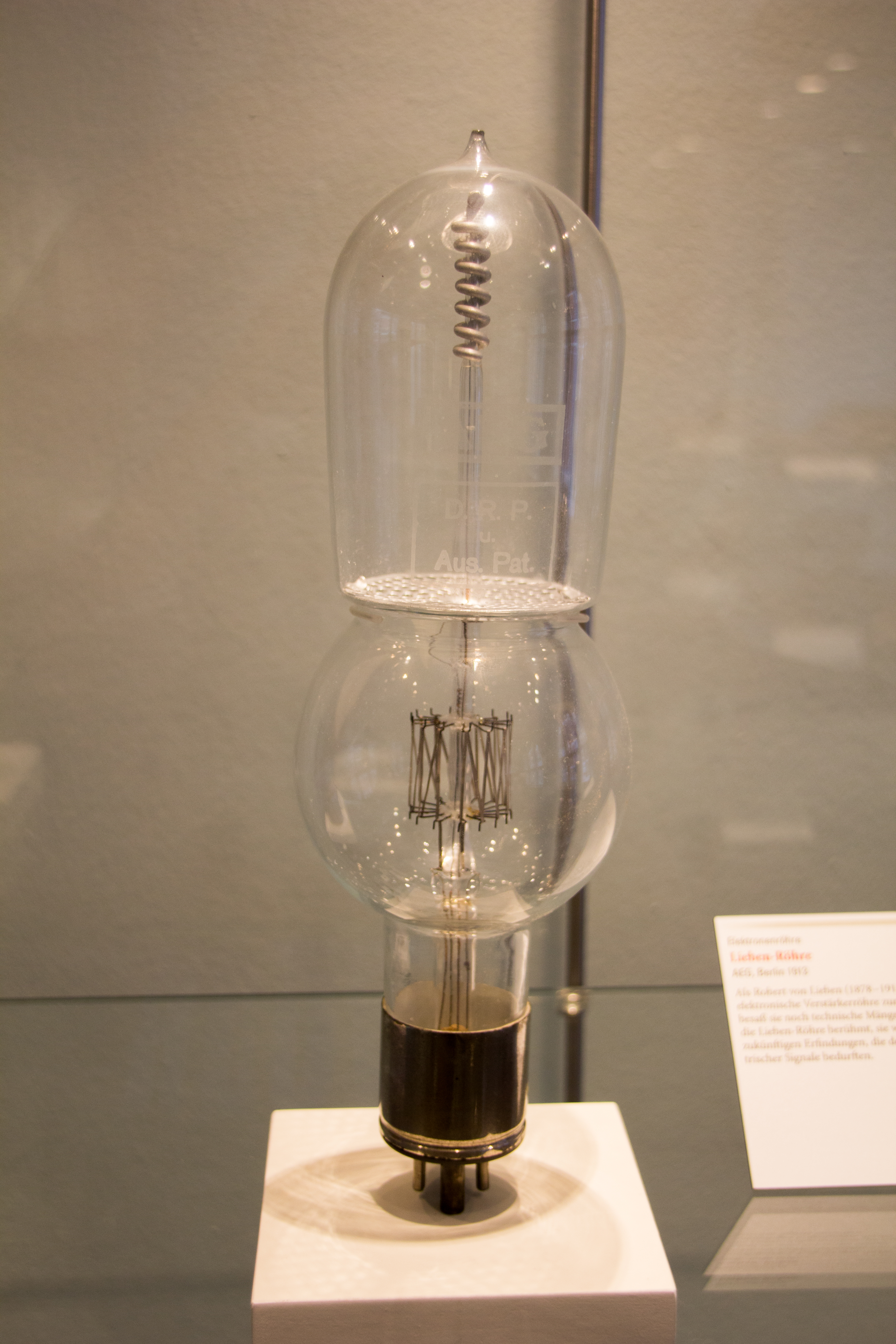
ieben–Reisz tube

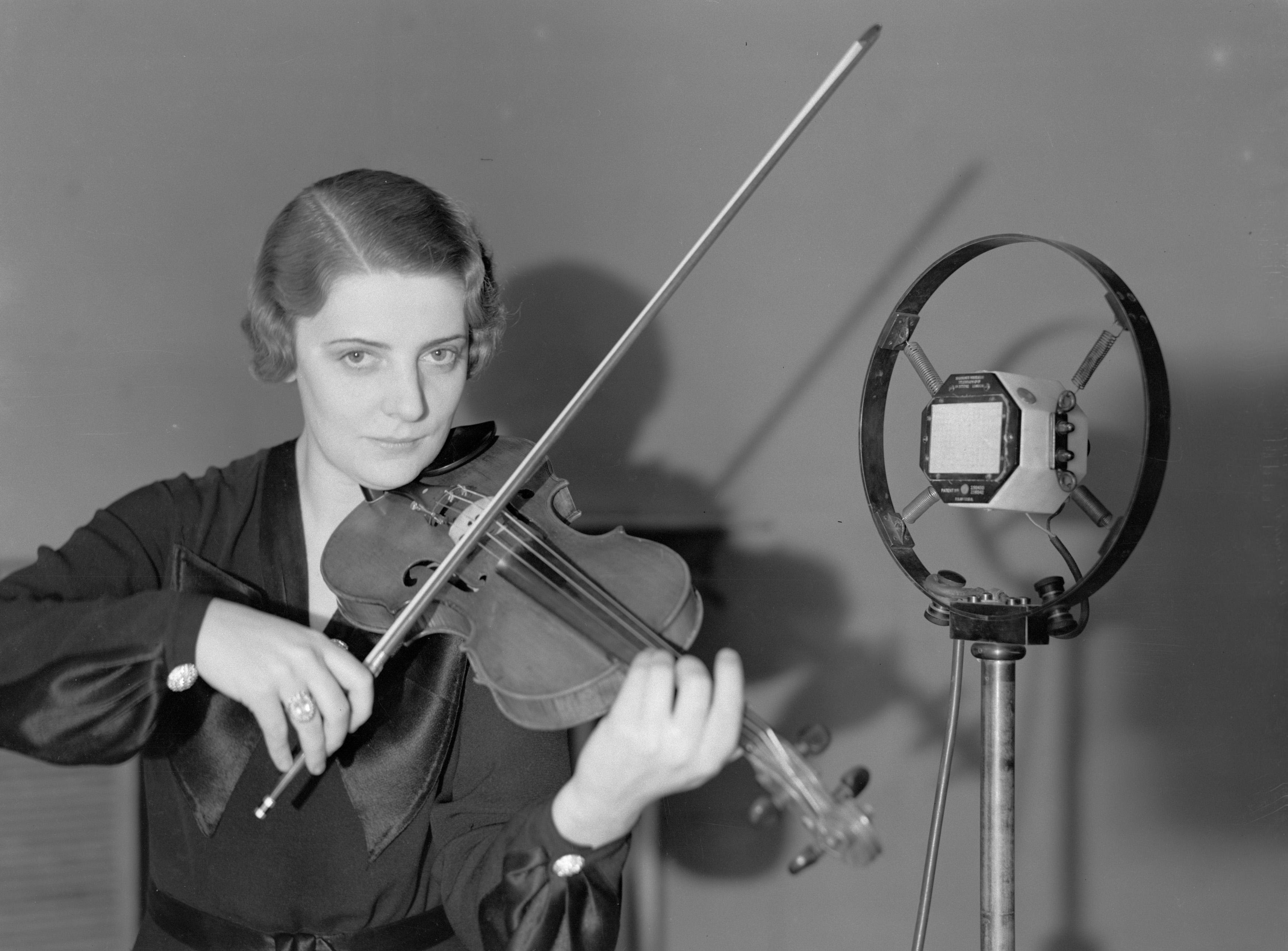
The Polish violinist Eugenia Umińska plays in front of a marble-block microphone
