= Robert von Lieben =

Austrian entrepreneur, physicist, and inventor (1878–1913)

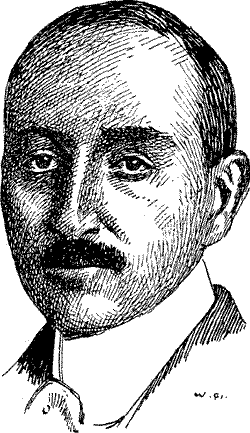

Robert von Lieben (September 5, 1878, in Vienna – February 20, 1913, in Vienna) was an Austrian entrepreneur, and self-taught physicist and inventor. Lieben and his associates Eugen Maximilian Reisz and Sigmund Strauss invented and produced a gas-filled triode – the first thermionic valve with a control grid that was designed specifically for amplification rather than demodulation of signals, and is a distant ancestor of the thyratron. After Lieben's death, the "Lieben valve", which is also known in English as the "Lieben-Reisz valve" and in German as the "LRS-Relais" (Lieben-Reisz-Strauss relay), was used in the world's first continuous wave radio frequency generator designed for radio telephony.

== Biography ==
Robert von Lieben was the fourth of five children born into a wealthy Viennese Jewish family who were related to the Auspitz, Gomperz, Todesco and Wertheimstein clans. His father Leopold von Lieben managed a family-owned bank and chaired the Vienna Trade Chamber; his mother Anna, née Todesco, younger daughter of Eduard von Todesco, was a talented amateur artist and poet. Well before Robert was born, Anna von Lieben suffered from chronic insomnia, drug addiction and various mental conditions. She was the first long-term patient of Sigmund Freud, who later described her under the alias of Cäcilie M. Robert's parents de facto separated in the 1890s.

Robert and his siblings grew up in Todesco Palace and from 1888, the Lieben Palace in Oppolzergasse near the Burgtheater and the University of Vienna. They were raised in the old-fashioned, upper-class Ringstrasse culture, and were exposed to science and philosophy by their home tutor Edmund Husserl and their distinguished relatives Rudolf Auspitz, Adolf Lieben and Franz Brentano – the latter being a daily visitor at the Lieben Palace during Robert's teenage years).

Robert attended an academic gymnasium and a Realschule, and was not considered an outstanding student. He leaned to technology and applied research, and spent all of his spare time with brother Ernst and cousin Leo doing experiments. His interests were primarily in the fields of telephony and electricity but he was open to new ideas. Robert left the school without an abitur, which was required to enrol at the University of Vienna, and instead became an apprentice at the Siemens-Schuckert factory in Nuremberg. Having learnt the basics of technology, Robert joined the military and volunteered with the uhlan regiment of the Austro-Hungarian Army. His career ended abruptly a few weeks later after he fell from a horse and was crippled. He never fully recovered from the injuries, which probably contributed to his early death at the age of 34.

After his discharge from the Army, Lieben attended Franz S. Exner's classes at the University of Vienna as an audit student; he also attended Walther Nernst's classes at the University of Göttingen, and developed a long-standing friendship with Nernst. During his two years at Göttingen, Lieben designed a camera for photographing the retina of the eye, an electrolytic phonograph and an electric transmission for vehicles.

In 1901, Lieben returned to Vienna and set up his own research laboratory in the ground floor of the Lieben Palace. With the help of University chemist Dr. Richard Leiser, he studied X-rays, electric discharge in gases and thermionic emission. In 1903, Lieben purchased a telephone equipment factory in Olomouc; telephony became his main field of work. Factory engineers Eugen Reisz and Siegmund Strauss assisted Lieben at the laboratory, and Leiser was his main scientific advisor until 1909.

== The Lieben-Reisz-Strauss valve ==
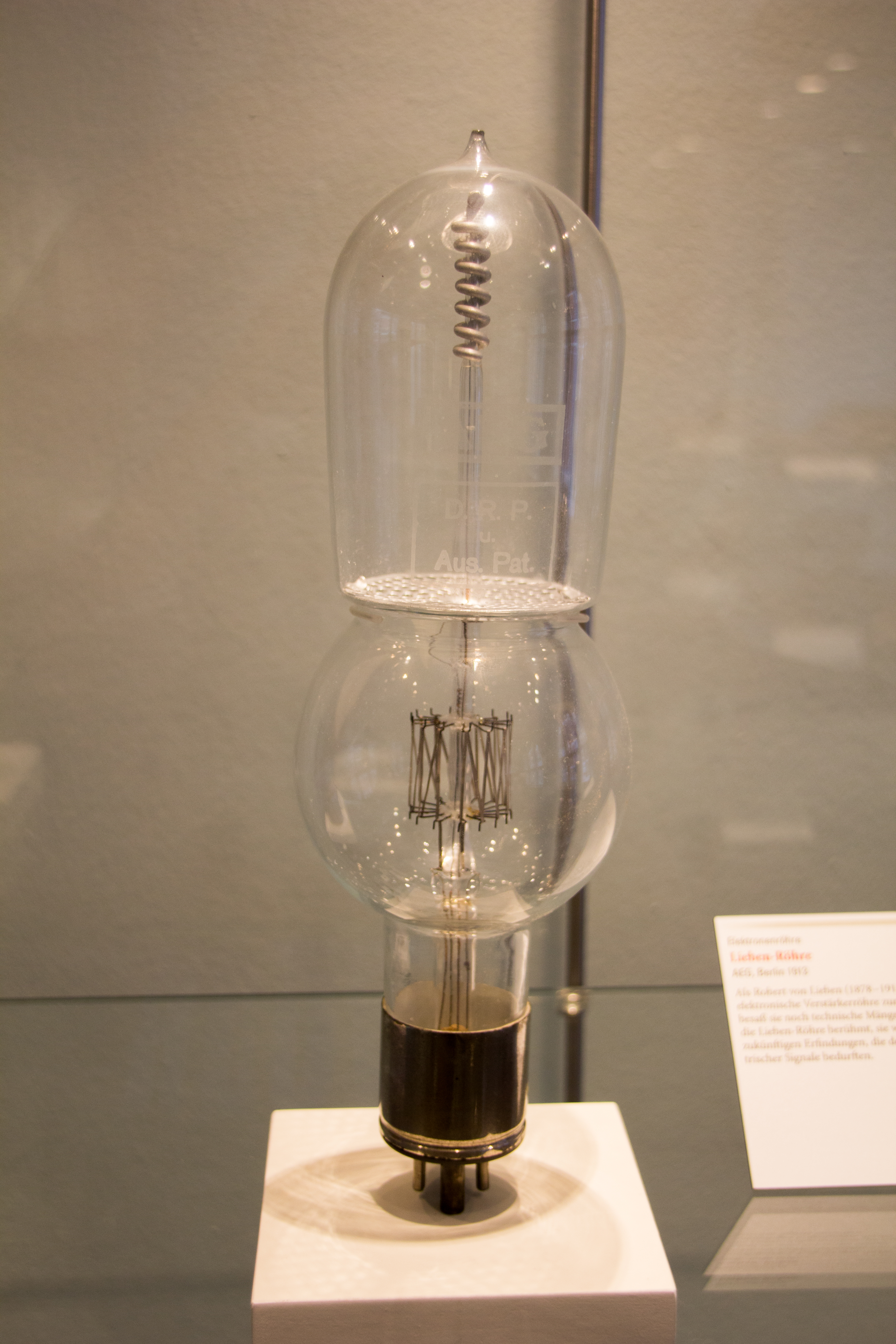
The 1910 Lieben-Reisz-Strauss valve. The perforated disk at the "waistline" is the control grid

The losses in copper telephone lines limited telephone services to between 300 km (190 miles) and 750 km (470 miles). Communication over longer ranges required the use of repeaters; the only type available in the 1900s was the mechanical amplifier that was built around a carbon microphone. These high-distortion devices were adequate for telegraphy but were almost unusable for transmission of speech. Lieben decided to make a low-distortion electronic amplifier using the already-known thermionic valve principle to control the flow of current with a weak input signal. Through his correspondence with Nernst, he knew of Arthur Wehnelt's 1903 invention of the oxide-coated cathode that enabled fairly strong thermionic emission compared to the inefficient pure tungsten cathode. At first, Lieben tried to control the current electromagnetically using a deflection coil. In 1906, he patented the electromagnetically-controlled "cathode ray relay"; although Lieben privately acknowledged the importance of Leiser's contribution, the patent was issued to Lieben alone. The device did not work as intended because the proposed cathode configuration could not focus the electron beam into a satisfactory shape.

Feeling no real incentive to run the business, in 1908, Lieben sold the Olomouc factory. Reisz and Strauss remained on his personal payroll and continued research into "cathode relays". According to correspondence from Lieben to Leiser, Reisz suggested the breakthrough improvement in early 1910, and later that year, the new, properly working valve was patented jointly by Lieben, Reisz and Strauss. It had electrostatic beam control via a perforated metal plate as a control grid that separated the valve into two chambers. The cathode was made of pure platinum foil that was coiled in a zigzag fashion around calcium oxide-coated tube. Functionally, the three electrodes were similar to those of Lee de Forest's audion but their layout was distinctly different. Unlike the audion, which was intended for demodulation of radio signals, the Lieben valve was designed for amplification. De Forest noted the audion's sensitivity but did not make the conclusion it could amplify signals; this discovery was made almost simultaneously by Lieben and Edwin Howard Armstrong.

By design, the Lieben valve was a low-vacuum valve with added features of a gas discharge tube, making it a remote ancestor of the thyratron. The valve contained a drop of mercury that vaporized when heated. Production tubes made between 1914 and 1918 had a special glass appendage that held the mercury. Lieben, like de Forest, believed valve currents were dominated by ions rather than electrons. The misconception about the benefits of gas-filled valves was dispelled in 1913 by Irving Langmuir, who would build a true hard vacuum valve in 1915.

The Lieben valve was successfully tested as a telephone line repeater. In 1912 AEG, Felten & Guillaume, Siemens & Halske and Telefunken formed a consortium to market the invention to the telephone industry. In February 1913, Lieben died suddenly from an glandular abscess, which was probably a consequence of his earlier injuries, and the enterprise was disbanded. Reisz relocated to Berlin and launched production of the Lieben valve at the AEG Kabelwerk Oberspree plant. Later the same year, Alexander Meissner of Telefunken applied his theory of positive feedback and used the Lieben valve to create a continuous-wave radio transmitter. Meissner's prototype generated 12 W of output power at a wavelength of 600 metres (about 500 kHz), transmitting amplitude-modulated radiotelephone signals over a range of up to 36 km (22 miles). This was the first successful application of continuous oscillations for wireless telephony.

== Recognition ==
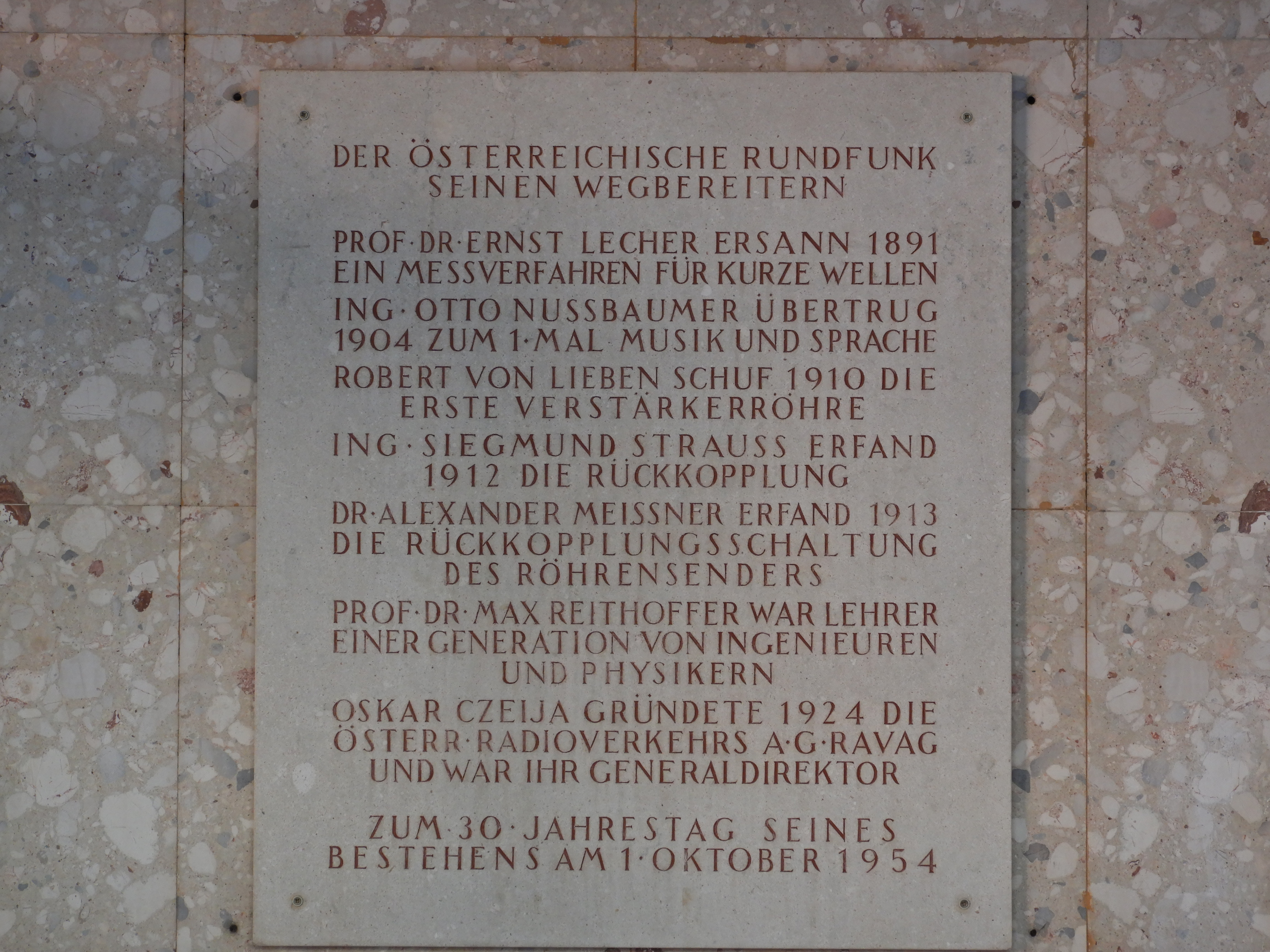
Memorial to the pioneers of radio, including Lieben and Strauss, at the former Radio Verkehrs AG building in Vienna

During the interwar period, Lieben was hailed in his native Austria as a leading inventor. Streets were named in his honour (German: Liebenstrasse) in Vienna, Amstetten and Berlin. Lieben was depicted on a 1936 Austrian postage stamp that was designed by Wilhelm Dachauer and Ferdinand Lorber. A memorial to Lieben at the Radio Verkehrs AG building in Vienna was opened in 1927 and destroyed after the Anschluss of 1938.

Historical value of the Lieben valve is debatable. According to Reiner zur Linde, it was not an invention but a development of existing designs and ideas of John Ambrose Fleming, Lee de Forest, Arthur Wehnelt and others. Nevertheless, Linde agreed it is a milestone in telephone technology; Lieben and his associates created the electronic amplifier, a working, low-distortion alternative to the carbon microphone repeater.

== Sources ==
- Follner, Michaela (2005). "Robert von Lieben". Biografisches Handbuch österreichischer Physiker und Physikerinnen anlässlich einer Ausstellung des Österreichischen Staatsarchivs (in German). Vol. 1 (Angetter – Martischnig). Österreichisches Staatsarchiv. pp. 76–78. Archived from the original on March 4, 2016.
- Lloyd, J. (2007). The Undiscovered Expressionist: A Life of Marie-Louise Von Motesiczky. Yale University Press. ISBN 9780300121544.
- Linde, R. (1995). Build Your Own Af Valve Amplifiers: Circuits for Hi-Fi and Musical Instruments. Elektor International Media. ISBN 9780905705392.
- Morris, P.R. (1990). A History of the World Semiconductor Industry. IET. ISBN 9780863412271.
- Pichler, F. (2001). "Robert von Lieben und die Entwicklung der Roehrenverstaerker" [Robert von Lieben and the development of the valve amplifier]. Plus Lucis (in German) (1): 29–33.
- Pichler, F. (2006). Robert von Lieben: 100 Jahre Patent Kathodenstrahlenrelais [Robert von Lieben: 100 years of the cathode beam relay patent] (in German). Trauner. ISBN 9783854879435.
- Rossbacher, K. (2003). Literatur und Bürgertum: fünf Wiener jüdische Familien von der liberalen Ära zum Fin de Siecle [Literature and bourgeoisie: five Viennese Jewish families of the liberal end-of-century era] (in German). Böhlau Verlag Wien. ISBN 9783205994978.
- Sōgo Okamura (1994). History of electron tubes. Ohmsha Ltd. / IOS Press. ISBN 9789051991451.
