= Sergei Pankejeff =

Russian noble (1886–1979)

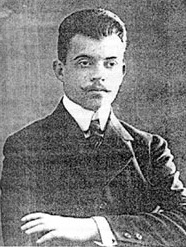
- Pankejeff in 1915
- Born: Сергей Константинович Панкеев; 24 December 1886; Odessa, Russian Empire
- Died: May 1979 (aged 92); Vienna, Austria
- Other name: Wolf Man

Sergei Konstantinovitch Pankejeff (Russian: Серге́й Константи́нович Панке́ев; 24 December 1886 – May 1979) was a Russian aristocrat from Odessa. Pankejeff is best known for being a patient of Sigmund Freud, who gave him the pseudonym of the Wolf Man (German: der Wolfsmann) to protect his identity, after a dream Pankejeff had of a tree full of white wolves.

== Biography ==
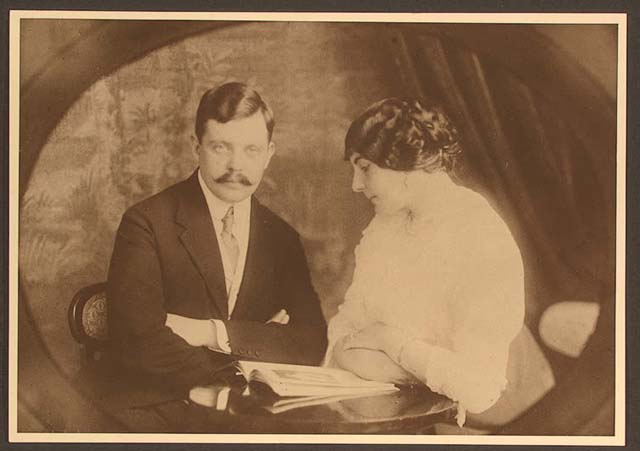
Pankejeff with his wife c. 1910

=== Early life and education ===
Pankejeff was born on the 24 December 1886 at his family's estate near Kakhovka on the river Dnieper. The Pankejeff family (Freud's German transliteration from the Russian; in English it would be transliterated as Pankeyev) was a wealthy family in St. Petersburg.

His father was Konstantin Matviyovich Pankeyev and his mother was Anna Semenivna, née Shapovalova.

Pankejeff's parents were married young and had a happy marriage, but his mother became sickly and was therefore somewhat absent from the lives of her two children. Pankejeff would later describe her as cold and lacking tenderness, though she would show special affection to him when he was sickly.

His father Konstantin, while being a cultured man and a keen hunter, was also an alcoholic who suffered from depressive episodes. He had been treated by Moshe Wulff (a disciple of Freud). He would later be diagnosed by Kraepelin with manic depressive disorder. His mother (Pankejeff's grandmother) had fallen into a depressive state after the death of a daughter and was thought to have died of suicide, while a paternal uncle of Pankejeff's was diagnosed with paranoia by the neuropsychiatrist Korsakov and admitted to an asylum.

Sergei and his sister Anna were brought up by two servants; Nanja and Grusha and an English governess named Miss Oven. Sergei's education would later be taken over by male tutors.

Sergei attended a grammar school in Russia, but after the 1905 Russian Revolution he spent considerable time abroad studying.

=== Psychological problems ===
In 1906, his older sister Anna committed suicide through the use of quicksilver while visiting the site of Mikhail Lermontov's fatal duel. She would die after two weeks of agony.

By 1907, Sergei began to show signs of serious depression. Sergei's father Konstantin also suffered from depression, often connected to specific political happenings of the day, and committed suicide in 1907 by consuming an excess of sleeping medication, a few months after Sergei had left for Munich to seek treatment for his own ailment. While in Munich, Pankejeff saw many doctors and stayed voluntarily at a number of elite psychiatric hospitals. In the summers, he always visited Russia.

During a stay in Kraepelin's sanatorium near Neuwittelsbach, he met a nurse who worked there, Theresa-Maria Keller, whom he fell in love with and wanted to marry.

Pankejeff's family upon learning about the relationship was against it, as not only was Keller from a lower class, but also she was older than Pankejeff and a divorced woman with a daughter. The couple married in 1914.

After the Russian Revolution, having lost most of his family's wealth, Pankejeff supported himself and his wife on his salary as an insurance clerk.

== Der Wolfsmann (The Wolf Man) ==
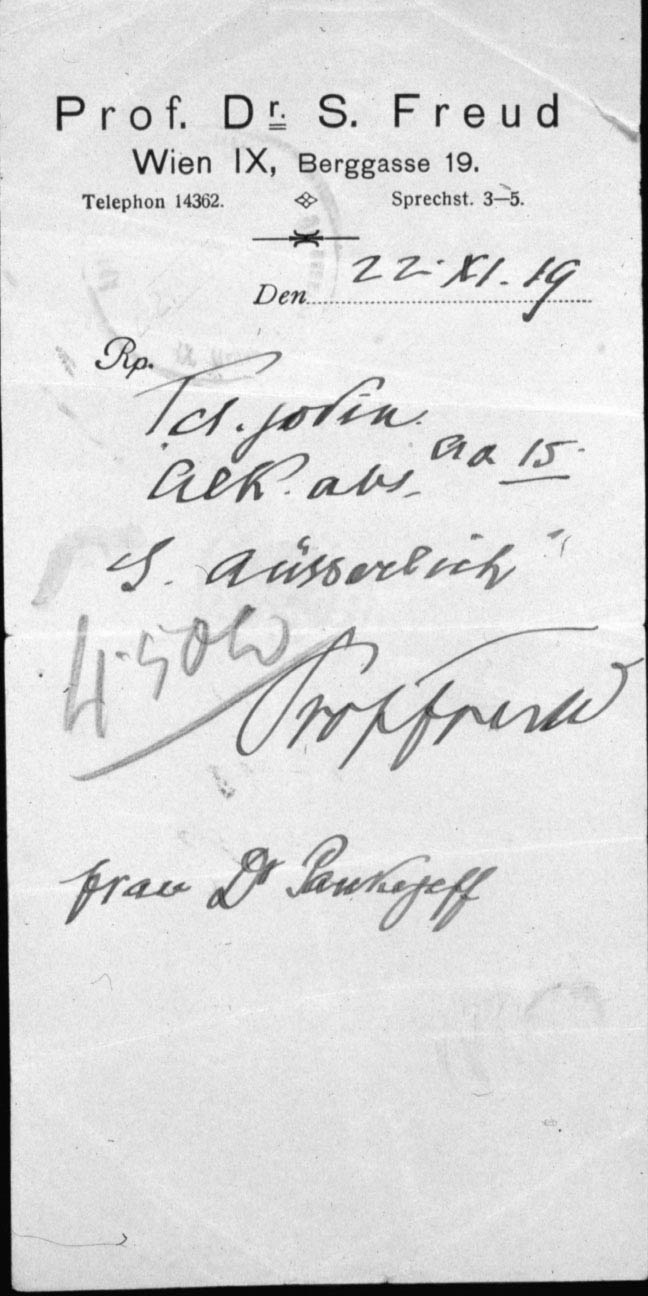
Prescription written by Sigmund Freud for the wife of Pankejeff, November 1919

In January 1910, Pankejeff's physician Leonid Drosnes brought him to Vienna to have treatment with Freud. Pankejeff and Freud met with each other many times between February 1910 and July 1914, and a few times thereafter, including a brief psychoanalysis in 1919. Pankejeff's "nervous problems" included his inability to have bowel movements without the assistance of an enema, as well as debilitating depression. Initially, according to Freud, Pankejeff resisted opening up to full analysis, until Freud gave him a year deadline for analysis, prompting Pankejeff to give up his resistances.

Freud's first publication on the "Wolf Man" was "From the History of an Infantile Neurosis" (Aus der Geschichte einer infantilen Neurose), written at the end of 1914, but not published until 1918. Freud's treatment of Pankejeff centered on a dream the latter had as a very young child which he described to Freud:

I dreamt that it was night and that I was lying in bed. (My bed stood with its foot towards the window; in front of the window there was a row of old walnut trees. I know it was winter when I had the dream, and night-time.) Suddenly the window opened of its own accord, and I was terrified to see that some white wolves were sitting on the big walnut tree in front of the window. There were six or seven of them. The wolves were quite white, and looked more like foxes or sheep-dogs, for they had big tails like foxes and they had their ears pricked like dogs when they pay attention to something. In great terror, evidently of being eaten up by the wolves, I screamed and woke up. My nurse hurried to my bed, to see what had happened to me. It took quite a long while before I was convinced that it had only been a dream; I had had such a clear and life-like picture of the window opening and the wolves sitting on the tree. At last I grew quieter, felt as though I had escaped from some danger, and went to sleep again.(Freud 1918)

Freud's eventual analysis (along with Pankejeff's input) of the dream was that it was the result of Pankejeff having witnessed a "primal scene" — his parents having sex a tergo or more ferarum ("from behind" or "doggy style") — at a very young age. Later in the paper, Freud posited the possibility that Pankejeff instead had witnessed copulation between animals, which was displaced to his parents.

Pankejeff's dream played a major role in Freud's theory of psychosexual development, and along with Irma's injection (Freud's own dream, which launched dream analysis), it was one of the most important dreams for the developments of Freud's theories. Additionally, Pankejeff became one of the main cases used by Freud to prove the validity of psychoanalysis. It was the third detailed case study, after "Notes Upon a Case of Obsessional Neurosis" in 1908 (also known by its animal nickname "Rat Man"), that did not involve Freud analyzing himself, and which brought together the main aspects of catharsis, the unconscious, sexuality, and dream analysis put forward by Freud in his Studies on Hysteria (1895), The Interpretation of Dreams (1899), and his Three Essays on the Theory of Sexuality (1905).

During his review of Freud's letters and other files, Jeffrey Moussaieff Masson uncovered notes for an unpublished paper by Freud's associate Ruth Mack Brunswick. Freud had asked her to review the Pankejeff case, and she discovered evidence that Pankejeff had been sexually abused by a family member during his childhood.

== Later life ==
Pankejeff later published his own memoir under Freud's given pseudonym and remained in contact with Freudian disciples until his own death (undergoing analysis for six decades despite Freud's pronouncement of his being "cured"), making him one of the longest-running famous patients in the history of psychoanalysis.

A few years after finishing psychoanalysis with Freud, Pankejeff developed a psychotic delirium. He was observed in a street staring at his reflection in a mirror, convinced that after having consulted and been treated by a dermatologist to correct a minor injury on his nose, his dermatologist had left him with what he perceived to be a hole in his nose. This obsession with this perceived flaw led to an obsessive compulsion to look at himself “in every shop window; he carried a pocket mirror … his fate depended on what it revealed or was about to reveal." Ruth Mack Brunswick, a Freudian, explained the delusion as displaced castration anxiety.

The psychoanalytical movement also provided Pankejeff with financial support in Vienna; psychoanalysts like Kurt Eissler (a former student of Freud's) dissuaded Pankejeff from talking to any media. The reason for this was that Pankejeff being one of Freud's most famous "cured" patients and the fact revealing that he was still suffering from mental illness would hurt the reputation of Freud and psychoanalysis. Pankejeff was essentially bribed to keep quiet.

In 1938, Pankejeff's wife committed suicide by inhaling gas. She had been depressed since the death of her daughter. As this coincided with the Anschluss; and the suicide wave among Jews who were trapped in Austria, research has also suggested that she was actually Jewish and that her suicide was prompted by her fear of the Nazis.

Facing a major crisis and not being able to get help from Ruth Mack Brunswick who had fled to Paris, Pankejeff approached Muriel Gardiner, who managed to get him a visa to travel there. He followed her to London before returning to Vienna in 1938. Gardiner also supplied him with "wonder pills" (Dexamyl) to help Pankejeff alleviate his emotional turmoil.

Throughout the following decades, Pankejeff went through some emotional crises which ultimately led to him becoming depressive. One of them being the death of Pankejeff's mother in 1953.

Pankejeff received intermittent treatment for these episodes from various psychoanalysts, most frequently by the head of The Vienna Psychoanalytical Society Alfred von Winterstein and then by his successor, Wilhelm Solms-Rödelheim.

In July 1977, Pankejeff suffered a heart attack and then contracted pneumonia. He was admitted to the Steinhof psychiatric hospital in Vienna.

Pankejeff broke his silence and agreed to talk to Karin Obholzer. Their conversations, which took place from January 1974 to September 1976, were recounted in the 1980 book "Conversations with the Wolf-Man Sixty years later", published after Pankejeff's death and per his own wishes. In Pankejeff's own words, his treatment by Freud had been "catastrophic."

== Criticism of Freud's interpretation ==
Critics, beginning with Otto Rank in 1926, have questioned the accuracy and efficacy of Freud's psychoanalytic treatment of Pankejeff. Similarly, in the mid-20th century, psychiatrist Hervey Cleckley dismissed Freud's diagnosis as far-fetched and entirely speculative. Dorpat put forward Freud's behavior in the Pankejeff case as an example of gaslighting (attempting to undermine someone's perceptions of reality).

Daniel Goleman wrote in 1990 in the New York Times:

Freud's key intervention with the Wolf Man rested on a nightmare in which he was lying in bed and saw some white wolves sitting on a tree in front of the open window. Freud deduced that the dream symbolized a trauma: that the Wolf Man, as a toddler, had witnessed his parents having intercourse. Freud's version of the supposed trauma, however, was contradicted by the Wolf Man himself, Sergej Pankejeff, in an interview with Karin Obholzer, a journalist who tracked him down in Vienna in the 1970s.

Mr. Pankejeff saw Freud's interpretation of his dream as 'terribly far-fetched.' Mr. Pankejeff said, 'The whole thing is improbable,' since in families of his milieu young children slept in their nanny's bedroom, not with their parents.

Mr. Pankejeff also disputed Freud's claim that he had been cured, and said he resented being 'propaganda' and 'a showpiece for psychoanalysis.' Mr. Pankejeff said, 'That was the theory, that Freud had cured me 100 percent.' However, 'It's all false.'

— Daniel Goleman, 6 March 1990

Mária Török and Nicolas Abraham have reinterpreted the Wolf Man's case (in The wolf man's magic word, a cryptonymy), presenting their notion of "the crypt" and what they call “cryptonyms." They provide a different analysis of the case than Freud, whose conclusions they criticise. According to the authors, Pankejeff's statements hide other statements, while the actual content of his words can be illuminated by looking into his multi-lingual background. According to the authors, Pankejeff hid secrets concerning his older sister, and as the Wolf Man both wanted to forget and preserve these issues, he encrypted his older sister, as an idealised "other" in the heart of himself, and spoke these secrets out loud in a cryptic manner, through words hiding behind words, rebuses, wordplays etc. For example, in the Wolf Man's dream, where six or seven wolves were sitting in a tree outside his bedroom window, the expression "pack of six", a "sixter" = shiestorka: siestorka = sister, which gives the conclusion that his sister is placed in the centre of the trauma.

The case forms a central part of the second plateau of Gilles Deleuze and Félix Guattari's A Thousand Plateaus, titled "One or Several Wolves?" In it, they repeat the accusation made in Anti-Oedipus that Freudian analysis is unduly reductive and that the unconscious is actually a "machinic assemblage". They argue that wolves are a case of the pack or multiplicity and that the dream was part of a schizoid experience.

== See also ==
- Rat Man
- Little Hans
- Anna O.
- Dora (case study)
- Screen memory
