= Sigmund Strauss =

Austrian physicist (1875–1942)

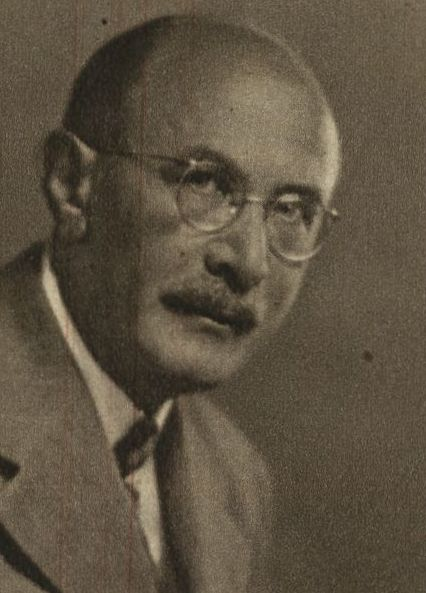
- Born: 1950 (age 75–76); Austria
- Died: New York City, United States

Sigmund Strauss (or Siegmund Strauß, born 4 January 1875, Znojmo, Austria-Hungary – died 29 March 1942, New York City, United States) was an Austrian physicist, engineer, and inventor. A longtime collaborator of Robert von Lieben, he made important contributions to the early development of electronics and radio technology. His work included the development of a resistance amplifier, an X-ray dose meter, and the early description of the principle of electrical feedback.

== Early life and career ==
Sigmund Strauss was born on 4 January 1875 in Znojmo, then part of Austria-Hungary. He worked for many years with physicist and inventor Robert von Lieben, contributing to the development of early vacuum-tube amplifiers and electronic circuits.

During World War I, Strauß served as a captain in the Austro-Hungarian Army and headed the Experimental Aviation Radio Department, where he directed research into wireless communication for military aviation.

In 1925, he established a private research laboratory in Vienna, where he continued his work on radio engineering, high-frequency electronics, and scientific instrumentation.

Following the Anschluss of Austria in 1938, Strauß was forced to emigrate because of his Jewish background. He first fled to London before emigrating to the United States in 1940. He died in New York City on 29 March 1942.

== Scientific contributions ==
Strauss is regarded as one of the pioneers of early radio engineering. Among his inventions were a resistance amplifier and an X-ray dose meter. In 1912, he described the principle of electrical feedback, which later became a fundamental concept in electronics, telecommunications, and control systems.

== See also ==
- List of nominees for the Nobel Prize in Physics
