= Totem =

Emblem of a group of people

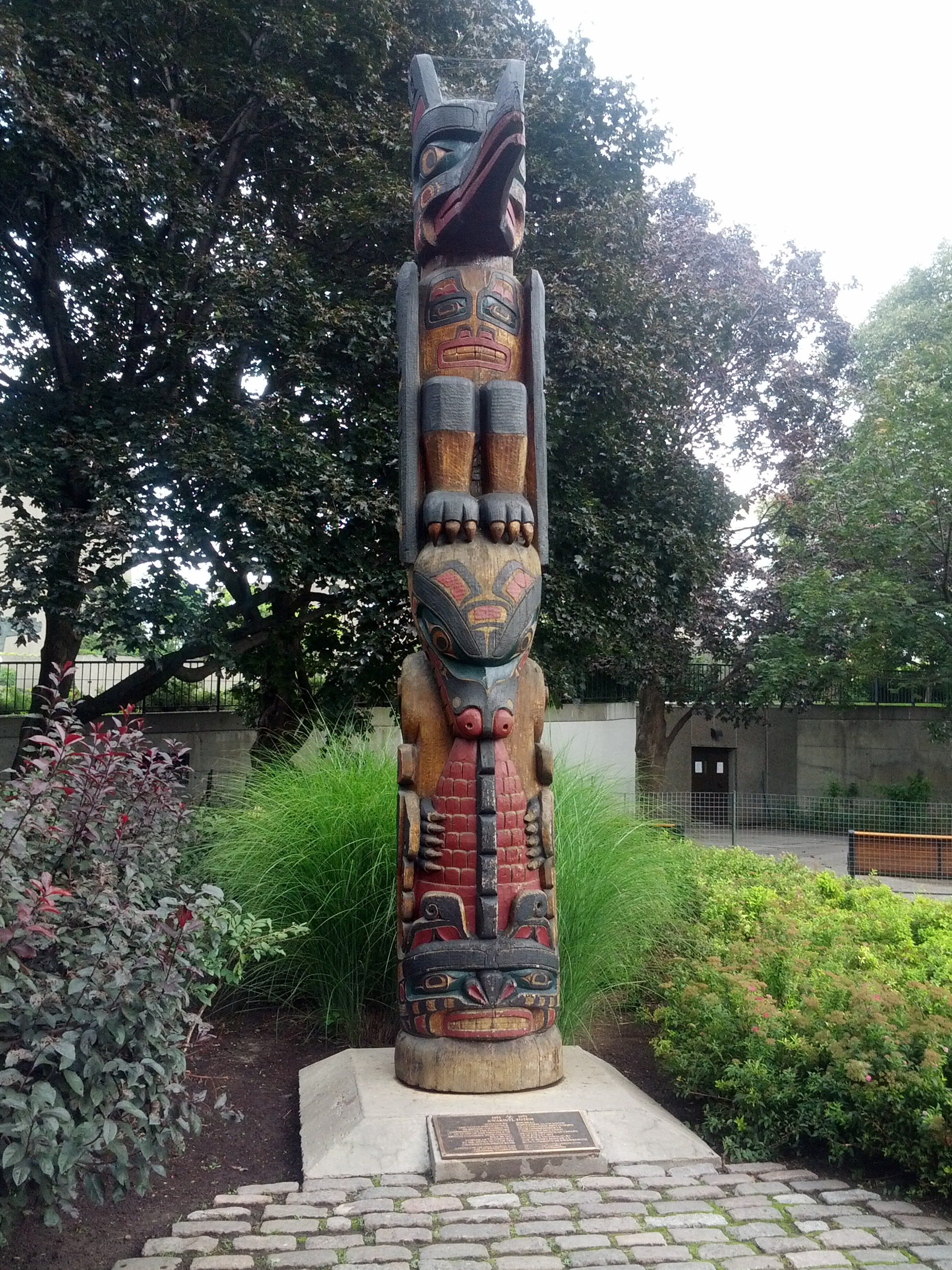
A totem pole in Ottawa, Ontario, Canada

A totem (from Ojibwe: ᑑᑌᒼ or ᑑᑌᒻ 'doodem') is a spirit being, sacred object, or symbol that serves as an emblem of a group of people, such as a family, clan, lineage, or tribe, such as in the Anishinaabe clan system.

While the word totem itself is an anglicisation of the Ojibwe term (and both the word and beliefs associated with it are part of the Ojibwe language and culture), belief in tutelary spirits and deities is not limited to the Ojibwe people. Similar concepts, under differing names and with variations in beliefs and practices, may be found in a number of cultures worldwide. The term has also been adopted, and at times redefined, by anthropologists and philosophers of different cultures.

Contemporary neoshamanic, New Age, and mythopoetic men's movements not otherwise involved in the practice of a traditional, tribal religion have been known to use "totem" terminology for the personal identification with a tutelary spirit or spirit guide.

== Ojibwe doodemen ==
The Anishinaabe peoples are divided into a number of doodeman (in syllabics: ᑑᑌᒪᐣ or ᑑᑌᒪᓐ), or clans, (singular: doodem) named mainly for animal totems (or doodem, as an Ojibwe person would say this word). In Anishinaabemowin, ᐅᑌᐦ ode' means heart. Doodem or clan literally would translate as 'the expression of, or having to do with one's heart', with doodem referring to the extended family. In the Anishinaabe oral tradition, in prehistory the Anishinaabe were living along the coast of the Atlantic Ocean when the great Miigis beings appeared from the sea. These beings taught the Mide way of life to the Waabanakiing peoples. Six of the seven great Miigis beings that remained to teach established the odoodeman for the peoples in the east. The five original Anishinaabe totems were Wawaazisii (bullhead), Baswenaazhi (echo-maker, i.e., crane), Aan'aawenh (pintail duck), Nooke (tender, i.e., bear) and Moozwaanowe ("little" moose-tail).

== Totem poles ==
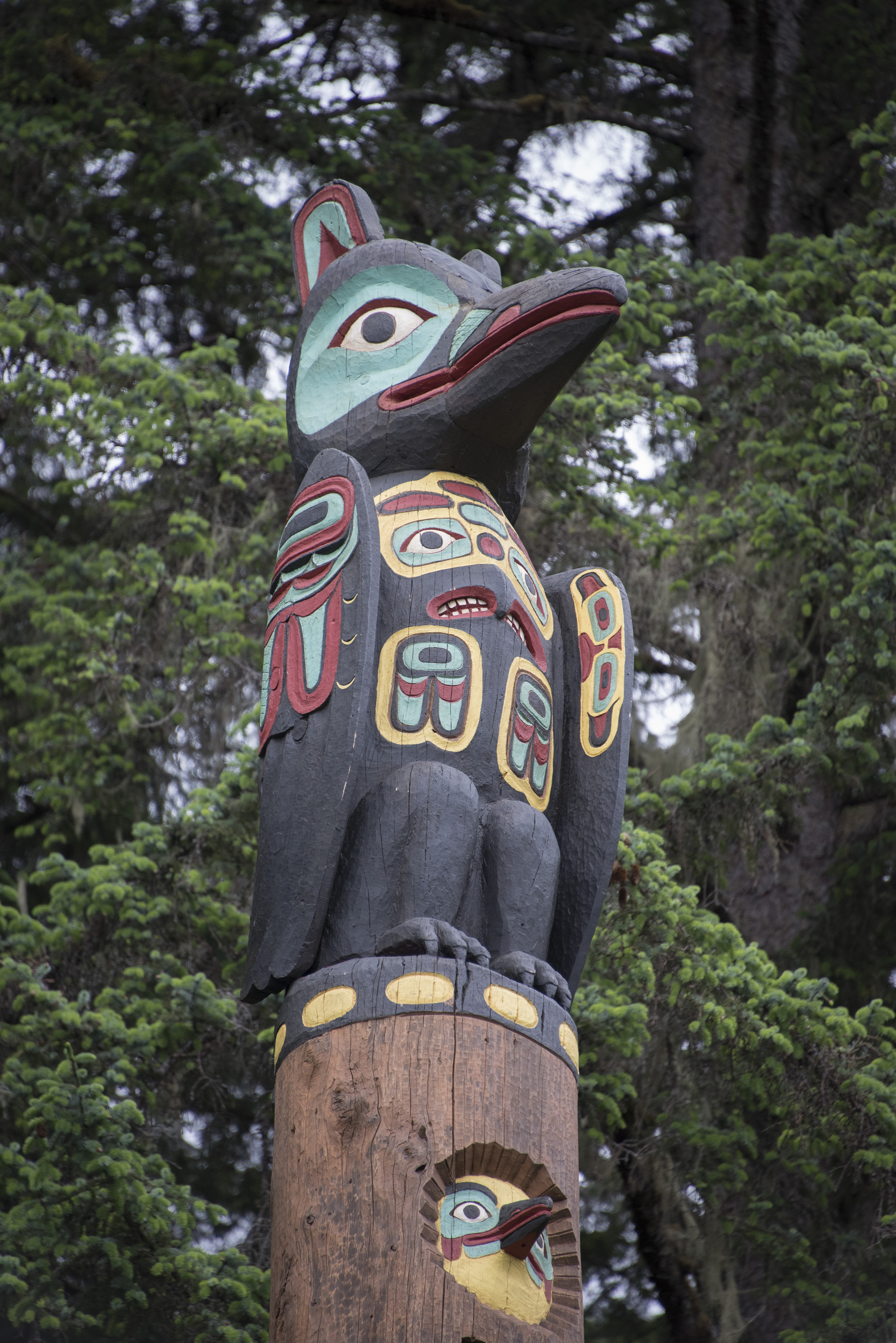
Yaxté totem pole, a Tlingit totem pole in Juneau, Alaska.

The totem poles of the Pacific Northwestern Indigenous peoples of North America are carved, monumental poles featuring many different designs (bears, birds, frogs, people, and various supernatural beings and aquatic creatures). They serve multiple purposes in the communities that make them. Similar to other forms of heraldry, they may function as crests of families or chiefs, recount stories owned by those families or chiefs, or commemorate special occasions. These stories are known to be read from the bottom of the pole to the top.

== Aboriginal Australians and Torres Strait Islanders ==
Personal totem of Mohegan Chief Tantaquidgeon, commemorated on a plaque at Norwich, Connecticut

The spiritual, mutual relationships between Aboriginal Australians, Torres Strait Islanders, and the natural world are often described as totems. Many Indigenous groups object to using the imported Ojibwe term "totem" to describe a pre-existing and independent practice, although others use the term. The term "token" has replaced "totem" in some areas.

In some cases, such as the Yuin of coastal New South Wales, a person may have multiple totems of different types (personal, family or clan, gender, tribal and ceremonial). The lakinyeri or clans of the Ngarrindjeri were each associated with one or two plant or animal totems, called ngaitji. Totems are sometimes attached to moiety relations (such as in the case of Wangarr relationships for the Yolngu).

Torres Strait Islanders have auguds, typically translated as totems. An augud could be a kai augud ("chief totem") or mugina augud ("little totem").

Early anthropologists sometimes attributed Aboriginal and Torres Strait Islander totemism to ignorance about procreation, with the entrance of an ancestral spirit individual (the "totem") into the woman believed to be the cause of pregnancy (rather than insemination). James George Frazer in Totemism and Exogamy wrote that Aboriginal people "have no idea of procreation as being directly associated with sexual intercourse, and firmly believe that children can be born without this taking place". Frazer's thesis has been criticised by other anthropologists, including Alfred Radcliffe-Brown in Nature in 1938.

== Anthropological perspectives ==
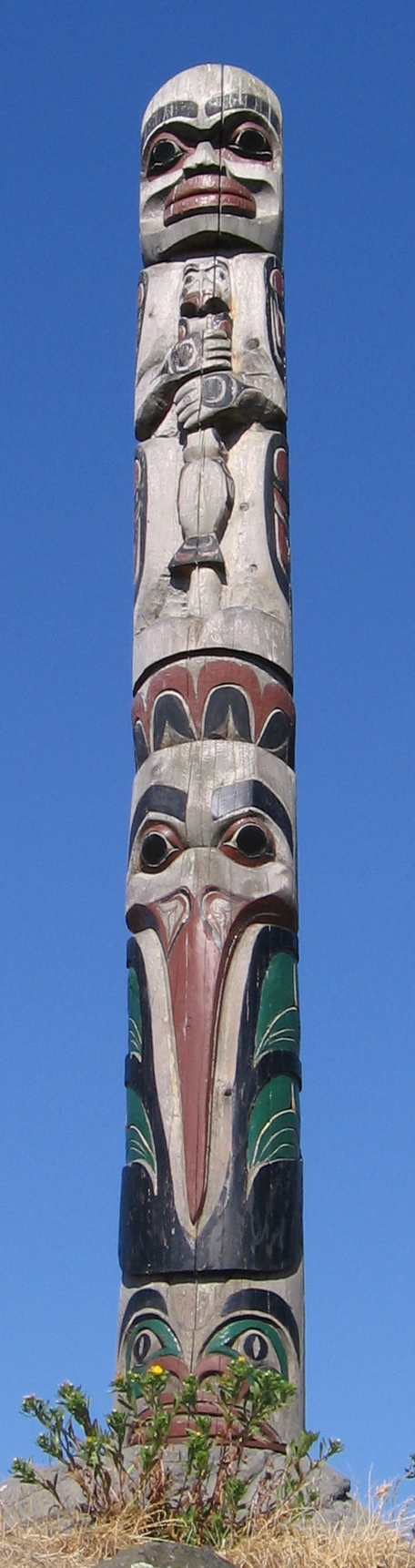
A totem pole in Thunderbird Park, Victoria, British Columbia

Early anthropologists and ethnologists like James George Frazer, Alfred Cort Haddon, John Ferguson McLennan and W. H. R. Rivers identified totemism as a shared practice across indigenous groups in unconnected parts of the world, typically reflecting a stage of human development.

Scottish ethnologist John Ferguson McLennan, following the vogue of 19th-century research, addressed totemism in a broad perspective in his study The Worship of Animals and Plants (1869, 1870). McLennan did not seek to explain the specific origin of the totemistic phenomenon but sought to indicate that all of the human race had, in ancient times, gone through a totemistic stage.

Another Scottish scholar, Andrew Lang, early in the 20th century, advocated a nominalistic explanation of totemism, namely, that local groups or clans, in selecting a totemistic name from the realm of nature, were reacting to a need to be differentiated. If the origin of the name was forgotten, Lang argued, there followed a mystical relationship between the object—from which the name was once derived—and the groups that bore these names. Through nature myths, animals and natural objects were considered as the relatives, patrons, or ancestors of the respective social units.

British anthropologist Sir James George Frazer published Totemism and Exogamy in 1910, a four-volume work based largely on his research among Indigenous Australians and Melanesians, along with a compilation of the work of other writers in the field.

By 1910, the idea of totemism as having common properties across cultures was being challenged, with Russian American ethnologist Alexander Goldenweiser subjecting totemistic phenomena to sharp criticism. Goldenweiser compared Indigenous Australians and First Nations in British Columbia to show that the supposedly shared qualities of totemism—exogamy, naming, descent from the totem, taboo, ceremony, reincarnation, guardian spirits and secret societies and art—were actually expressed very differently between Australia and British Columbia. He then expands his analysis to other groups to show that they share some of the customs associated with totemism, without having totems. He concludes by offering two general definitions of totemism, one of which is: "Totemism is the tendency of definite social units to become associated with objects and symbols of emotional value".

The founder of a French school of sociology, Émile Durkheim, examined totemism from a sociological and theological point of view, attempting to discover a pure religion in very ancient forms and claimed to see the origin of religion in totemism. In addition, he argued that totemism also served as a form of collective worship, reinforcing social cohesion and solidarity.

The leading representative of British social anthropology, A. R. Radcliffe-Brown, took a totally different view of totemism. Like Franz Boas, he was skeptical that totemism could be described in any unified way. In this he opposed the other pioneer of social anthropology in England, Bronisław Malinowski, who wanted to confirm the unity of totemism in some way and approached the matter more from a biological and psychological point of view than from an ethnological one. According to Malinowski, totemism was not a cultural phenomenon, but rather the result of trying to satisfy basic human needs within the natural world. As far as Radcliffe-Brown was concerned, totemism was composed of elements that were taken from different areas and institutions, and what they have in common is a general tendency to characterize segments of the community through a connection with a portion of nature. In opposition to Durkheim's theory of sacralization, Radcliffe-Brown took the point of view that nature is introduced into the social order rather than secondary to it. At first, he shared with Malinowski the opinion that an animal becomes totemistic when it is "good to eat." He later came to oppose the usefulness of this viewpoint, since many totems—such as crocodiles and flies—are dangerous and unpleasant.

In 1938, the structural functionalist anthropologist A. P. Elkin wrote The Australian Aborigines: How to understand them. His typologies of totemism included eight "forms" and six "functions".

The forms identified were:

- individual (a personal totem),
- sex (one totem for each),
- moiety (the "tribe" consists of two groups, each with a totem),
- section (the "tribe" consists of four groups, each with a totem),
- subsection (the "tribe" consists of eight groups, each with a totem),
- clan (a group with common descent share a totem or totems),
- local (people living or born in a particular area share a totem) and
- "multiple" (people across groups share a totem).

The functions identified were:

- social (totems regulate marriage, and often a person cannot eat the flesh of their totem),
- cult (totems associated with a secret organization),
- conception (multiple meanings),
- dream (the person appears as this totem in others' dreams),
- classificatory (the totem sorts people) and
- assistant (the totem assists a healer or clever person).

The terms in Elkin's typologies see some use today, but Aboriginal customs are seen as more diverse than his typologies suggest.

As a chief representative of modern structuralism, French ethnologist Claude Lévi-Strauss, and his Le Totémisme aujourd'hui ("Totemism Today" [1958]) are often cited in the field.

In the 21st century, Australian anthropologists question the extent to which "totemism" can be generalized even across different Aboriginal Australian peoples, let alone to other cultures like the Ojibwe from whom the term was originally derived. Rose, James and Watson write that:

The term 'totem' has proved to be a blunt instrument. Far more subtlety is required, and again, there is regional variation on this issue.

== Literature ==
Poets, and to a lesser extent fiction writers, often use anthropological concepts, including the anthropological understanding of totemism. For this reason, literary criticism often resorts to psychoanalytic, anthropological analyses.

== See also ==
- Anishinaabe clan system
- ʻAumakua
- Charge (heraldry)
- Devak, a type of family totem in Maratha culture
- Fylgja
- Huabiao
- Illyrian religion
- Jangseung
- Kóryos
- Little Arpad
- Moe anthropomorphism
- Orenda
- Religious symbolism in U.S. sports team names and mascots
- Tamga, an abstract seal or device used by Eurasian nomadic peoples
- Totem and Taboo by Sigmund Freud
- Shona Culture - Mitupo
