= Cäcilie M. =

Pseudonym of Freud's early patient Anna von Lieben (c. 1847–1900)

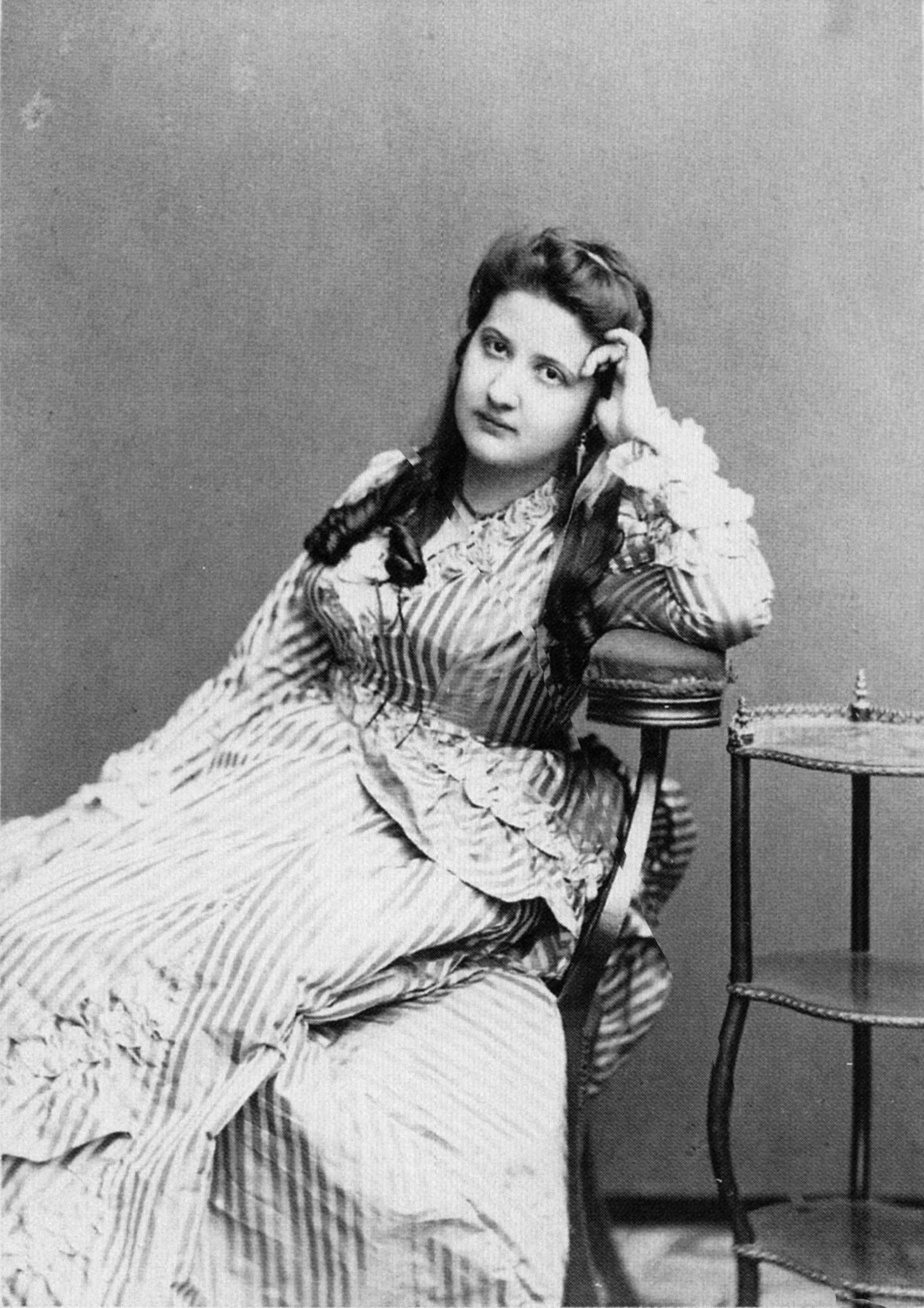
Anna Todesco in a day dress

Cäcilie M. (Anna von Lieben, born Anna von Todesco; c. 1847–1900) is the pseudonym of one of Freud's first patients, whom he called in 1890 his "principal client" and in 1897 his "instructress".

== Life ==
Born into a rich Austrian Jewish family, Anna von Lieben was referred to Freud in the late eighties for help with a long-standing series of nervous disorders. After referring her for a consultation with Charcot, Freud treated her (with some short-term success) through hypnotism, taking her with him to see Hippolyte Bernheim in 1889 in the (unsuccessful) hope that he might be able to work a permanent cure. He also used abreaction for temporary relief of her symptoms, noting, however, that her sense of guilt and self-reproaches would swiftly return after the treatment sessions.

Her symptoms, including hallucinations and physical spasms, provided the basis for many of Freud's claims about conversion hysteria; and how to interpret back from physical symptom or hallucination to the underlying (symbolic) emotional meaning it expressed, often by a "punning" logic.

== Criticism ==
Freud's later critics have argued that his continuing treatment of Anna, given awareness of her incurability, amounted to using her as a kind of cash-cow.

Freud continued during the six years of psychoanalysis to treat her continuously with injections of morphine without any success or therapeutic result.

== See also ==
- Anna O.
- Franz Brentano (her brother-in-law)
- Robert von Lieben (her son)
- Somatization disorder
- Studies on Hysteria
- Talking cure
