= Afterwardsness =

Concept of Freudian psychoanalysis

In the psychoanalysis of Sigmund Freud, afterwardsness (German: Nachträglichkeit) is a "mode of belated understanding or retroactive attribution of sexual or traumatic meaning to earlier events. Nachträglichkeit, is also translated as deferred action, retroaction, après-coup, afterwardsness". As summarized by another scholar, 'In one sense, Freud's theory of deferred action can be simply stated: memory is reprinted, so to speak, in accordance with later experience'.

== History and development of the term ==
=== Freud ===
The psychoanalytical concept of "afterwardsness" (German: Nachträglichkeit) appeared initially in Freud's writings in the 1890s in the commonsense form of the German adjective-adverb "afterwards" or "deferred" (nachträglich): as Freud wrote in the unfinished and unpublished "A Project for a Scientific Psychology" of 1895, 'a memory is repressed which has only become a trauma after the event '. However the 'theory of deferred action had already been [publicly] put forward by Freud in the Studies on Hysteria (1895)', and in a paper of 1898 he elaborates on the idea of deferred action: 'the pathogenic effect of a traumatic event occurring in childhood... [manifesting] retrospectively when the child reaches a subsequent phase of sexual development'.

The same idea would feature prominently a couple of decades later in his study of the "Wolf Man": 'The effects of the scene were deferred, but...had the same effect as though it were a recent experience'. 'Thus although he never offered a definition, much less a general theory, of the notion of deferred action, it was indisputably looked on by Freud as part of his conceptual equipment'.

=== Lacan ===
It was Lacan who brought the term back from obscurity after Freud's death—his translation in the French language as the "après-coup" fits into the context of his "return to Freud" ("rapport de Rome", 1953)—and certainly French psychoanalysis has since taken the lead in its explication. Lacan himself claimed in his Seminar that "the real implication of the nachträglich, for example, has been ignored, though it was there all the time and had only to be picked up," while writing in Ecrits of "'deferred action' (Nachtrag), to rescue another of these terms from the facility into which they have since fallen...they were unheard of at that time."

=== Jean Laplanche ===
After Lacan's après-coup, Jean Laplanche's contribution to the concept of the afterwardsness signifies something very different: with Jean Laplanche and in the relation to Freud (theory of the seduction, neurotica), Lacan's "Other" loses its capital letter of the "Symbolic", that links Lacan to French structuralism (Saussure's linguistics, Lévi-Strauss's ethnology), and that links also Lacan afterwards in the history of the ideas (from the 1960s on)—by "inversion in the opposite direction" (a "destiny of the drive" in psychoanalytic theory)—to the French theory at the place of Jacques Derrida's deconstruction.

"Afterwardsness" becomes the key concept in Laplanche's "theory of the general seduction" (théorie de la séduction généralisée) and of the corresponding importance of 'the act of psychic translation... of [enigmatic] deposits by the other'—an approach which develops further Freud's letter 52/112 (to Wilhelm Fliess). In his "Notes on Afterwardsness" (1992), based on a conversation of Jean Laplanche with Martin Stanton, there is an excellent definition of afterwardsness in Laplanche's sense, including the category of the enigmatic message, that highlights Laplanche's contribution to Freud's concept:

Freud's concept of afterwardsness contains both great richness and great ambiguity between retrogressive and progressive directions. I want to account for this problem of the directional to and fro by arguing that, right at the start, there is something that goes in the direction from the past to the future, and in the direction from the adult to the baby, which I call the implantation of the enigmatic message. This message is then retranslated following a temporal direction which is sometimes progressive and sometimes retrogressive (according to my general model of translation).

== Deferred obedience ==
For Freud, deferred obedience was closely related to deferred action: again, "a deferred effect...a 'deferred obedience' under the influence of repression". Thus for instance Freud explored the different phases of a man's infantile attitude to his father: "As long as his father was alive it showed itself in unmitigated rebelliousness and open discord, but immediately after his death it took the form of a neurosis based on abject submission and deferred obedience to him".

In Totem and Taboo he generalised the principle and "depicted the social contract also as based on posthumous obedience to the father's authority"—offset at times by its converse, occasional Carnival-like licence such as "the memorial festival of the totem meal, in which the restrictions of deferred obedience no longer held".

== Bibliography ==
- Sigmund Freud and Joseph Breuer: Studies on Hysteria (with Josef Breuer) (Studien über Hysterie, 1895)
- The Complete Letters of Sigmund Freud to Wilhelm Fliess, 1887-1904, Publisher: Belknap Press, 1986, ISBN 0-674-15421-5
- Sigmund Freud, Complete works, Standard edition.
- Jean Laplanche and Jean-Bertrand Pontalis : Vocabulaire de la psychanalyse, Paris, 1967, éd. 2004 PUF-Quadrige, No 249, ISBN 2-13-054694-3; The Language of Psycho-Analysis. W. W. Norton and Company. ISBN 0-393-01105-4.
- Alain de Mijolla: "Dictionnaire international de la psychanalyse, Ed.: Hachette, 2005, ISBN 2-01-279145-X; International dictionary of psychoanalysis. Thomson Gale, Detroit, 2005.
- Jacques Lacan, Écrits, Paris, Seuil, 1966, ISBN 2-02-002752-6.
- Jacques Lacan, Le Séminaire Livre I Les écrits techniques de Freud, 1953-1954, Paris, Seuil, 1975, ISBN 2-02-002768-2.
- Jean Laplanche and Jean-Bertrand Pontalis, Fantasme originaire Fantasmes des origines Origines du fantasme [1964], Paris : Hachette (Collection « Textes du XXe siècle »), 1985; Paris, Hachette Pluriel, 2002.
- Jean Laplanche, Nouveaux fondements pour la psychanalyse, Paris, PUF, 1987 (New foundations for the psychoanalysis).
- Jean Laplanche: Seduction, Translation, Drives, A dossier compiled by John Fletcher and Martin Stanton, Translations by Martin Stanton, Psychoanalytic Forum, Institute of Contemporary Arts London, 1992. ISBN 0-905263-68-5
- Jean Laplanche : Problématiques VI: L'après-coup - La Nachträglichkeit dans l'après-coup (1990-1991), Paris, PUF, 2006, ISBN 2-13-055519-5.
- Revue française de psychanalyse, t. XLVI, 3, « L'après-coup », 1982 et t. LXX, 3, 2006.
- Michel Neyraut: Considérations rétrospectives sur "l'après-coup", in Revue française de psychanalyse, 1997, no. 4, ISBN 2-13-048501-4
- Bernard Chervet: L'après-coup. Prolégomènes in Revue française de psychanalyse, 2006, no. 3
