= Martin Stanton =

Martin Stanton (born 21 March 1950) is a British writer, teacher and psychoanalyst.

== Biography ==
He is known for his pioneering work in establishing Psychoanalytic Studies as a distinct and thriving academic subject that is now taught in universities around the world – he founded the first prototype Centre for Psychoanalytic Studies at the University of Kent in Canterbury, UK, in 1986. He is equally known for his innovative and challenging work on the nature and function of unconscious processes. This began this with his first book Outside the Dream (1983) – and originally and free-associatively explored the vital impact of Lacanian thinking on contemporary psychoanalysis at that time (when Lacan was largely unknown in the English-speaking world). The book was equally a poetic account of Stanton's own early personal engagement with psychoanalysis. He spent much of the 1970s training to be an analyst in Paris, and was a student at the Ecole Normale Superieure, where he attended classes and lectures by Gilles Deleuze, Félix Guattari and Michel Foucault, whose teaching variously resonates in the footnotes to the book.

He followed Outside the Dream with a critical introduction to Sándor Ferenczi (1991) – which was the first major study of the pioneer Hungarian psychoanalyst, and this provoked a widely celebrated "Ferenczi renaissance" (Berman, 2002) in both the psychotherapeutic and cultural worlds. In the 1990s, he opened up large avenues in Ferenczi's thinking that were previously undiscovered, above all the critical value of utraquism – or the productive and free-associative use of analogies – in analytic work with unconscious processes, in particular the use of the analogy of the teratoma (an embryonic form of tumour) to engage with the after-effects of sexual abuse.

In Paris, Stanton also became closely linked with the work of the French psychoanalyst Jean Laplanche, and, through him, became actively involved in seminal debates on the central role of afterwardsness in the unconscious psychological process of trauma. These debates are now generally referred to under the general title of the new seduction theory. In this context, in 1998, Stanton launched his own notion of the bezoaric effect, which was developed from an analogy with animals' production of bezoar stones from progressive digestive regurgitations in wild and desert terrain (1998). At the same time, his book Out of Order (1997) presented an extensive critical review of his own contributions in the light of his psychoanalytic forebears, Ferenczi, Michael Balint, and Laplanche.

In this context, Out of Order was clearly written to re-connect psychoanalytic clinical work to its founding revolutionary impetus in the residual unconscious, and help people gain the strength and insight to remain open to unpredictable and unforeseen change, and to challenge their world, rather than conform and adapt to increasingly confined norms.

== Work ==
Stanton's work strongly opposes the core strategies of Cognitive Behavioural Therapy, notably in the way in which it aims to "manage" the production of symptoms of mental disorders. Above all, he sets out to expose how the prioritisation of cognition distorts and actively diminishes the elaborative complexity of conscious and unconscious life – notably by imposing set forms of linear causality (such as dialectics), and privileging projective ego-based thought-process over introjection (which centrally concerns the impact of feeling/sensations on thinking).

He chooses rather to explore the alternative dynamics generated within the interactive space between primary feeling/sensations and cognitive process. A central focus here is the elaborative feeling/thought dynamic that follows a primary feeling/sensory input (introjection) – or the particular inner-outer reverberations that follow once the psyche is struck or hit by something.

First of all, there are psychic contusions – psychic elaborations which evolve like bruises which brighten and darken, colour-up, and shift around feeling/sensation pin-point triggers (which Stanton calls contundors). Then there are the imagos, the amalgams generated from various bits of visual/sensation material that randomly stick together to form an evanescent image or sound that freeze-frames the ongoing narrative.

Finally, there are the set interactive systemic structures of effect, generated by primary feeling/sensory introjections, that form initially around contundors, and then subsequently progressively elaborate after-effects around imagos. Stanton has so far introduced and elaborated on the following general interactive systemic structures:

- the bezoaric effect – a post-traumatic systemic effect – which progresses like the successive regurgitations of mountain and desert animals, as well as humans in extremis, which shift and re-work undigested material until all the feeling and meaning is extracted, and only the bezoar stone – the traumatic jewel – remains. 'In the bezoaric effect...unconscious elements of traumatic experience shift, realign and transform through communicative exchange in therapy'.
- the caddis effect – a defensive systemic effect – which progresses in a similar way as the caddis insect constructs its defensive pupa-case, by surrounding the ego-core with bright and beautiful shiny ready-mades from the surrounding cultural environment.
- the karaoke effect – a transcendent sublime systemic effect – where the set narrative links between thoughts and feelings suddenly disengage along zip lines (immortalized by Barnett Newman), and transpose into an independent and often contradictory narrative. As with karaoke, a pre-formed ready-made potential space opens to take centre-stage and burst into song, and
- the medusa effect – an anxiety-producing systemic effect – where primary-sourced feeling-sensations stick like glue, then ensnare the critical function of thinking. Like a jellyfish (also called a medusa), the medusa effect generates a glutinous mass which spreads out tentacles to sting and progressively deaden the subject. It installs panic as an automatic reflex, which is activated precisely at the point where thought-cycles are switched off by primary feeling-sensations. The medusa effect also evokes Ovid's Medusa, the beautiful woman raped by Poseidon, who Athena subsequently transforms into a snake-locked monster, who turns all who gaze on her into stone. Perseus manages to behead her without stone-transmogrification, by looking at her image reflected in his shield – and so inspires further reflection on the role of observation in working with anxiety and panic.

== Works ==
- Outside the Dream: Lacan and French Styles of Psychoanalysis, (Routledge, 1983), ISBN 0-7100-9273-3.
- Sándor Ferenczi: Reconsidering Active Intervention (Aronson/Free Association, 1991), ISBN 0-87668-569-6.
- Sándor Ferenczi et la technique active (Presses Universitaires de France, 1997), ISBN 2-13-047390-3.
- Out of Order: Clinical Work and Unconscious Process (Rebus/Other Press, 1997), ISBN 1-900877-10-4
- ‘L’apres-coup et les problemes de figuration a l’origine du symptome’, in Nouveaux Fondements pour la Psychanalyse, edited by Jean Laplanche (Presses Universitaires de France, 1994).
- ‘The Bezoaric Effect: Working With Traumatic Process’, The Psychoanalytic Review, vol. 85, no.3, June 1998
- ‘Imagos and the Problem of the Imaginary’, in Teaching Transference: On the Foundations of Psychoanalytic Studies, edited by Martin Stanton and David Reason (Rebus/Other Press, 1996), ISBN 1-900877-01-5
- ‘Ex Cathedra: Teaching, Transference and Knowledge’, European Journal of Psychotherapy and Counselling, vol. 9, no.2, June 2007.
- Jean Laplanche: Seduction, Translation and the Drives, edited by Martin Stanton & John Fletcher (ICA, 1992), ISBN 0-905263-68-5.
- Making Sense (Phoenix Publishing House, 2019), ISBN 978-1-912691-55-5.
