= Ruth Mack Brunswick =

American psychiatrist (1897–1946)

Ruth Jane Mack Brunswick (February 17, 1897 – January 24, 1946), born Ruth Jane Mack, was an American psychiatrist. Mack was initially a student and later a close confidant of and collaborator with Sigmund Freud and was responsible for much of the fleshing out of Freudian theory. Brunswick pioneered the psychoanalytic treatment of psychoses, and the study of emotional development between young children and their mothers, and the importance of this relationship in creating mental illness.

She went to Radcliffe College in 1914 and planned on going to Harvard to receive medical education, but was denied due to her gender and graduated from Tufts Medical School instead. Her work was noticed by Freud and she began working with him to develop psychoanalysis in Vienna.

== Early life and education ==
Ruth Jane Mack Brunswick, born Ruth Jane Mack, was born on February 17, 1897, in Chicago, Illinois, and was raised in Cincinnati. She was the only child of attorney Julian Mack, later a federal judge, and his wife Jessie (Fox) Mack. Her parents were part American and had some German-Jewish roots. She was on bad terms with her strict father. (Note: "Although in her youth she had shared her father's Zionist sympathies, she was not otherwise involved in Jewish affairs and was by conviction an atheist." 'BRUNSWICK, Ruth Jane Mack (Feb. 17, 1897-Jan. 24, 1946)' in Notable American Women: 1607–1950. Retrieved August 1, 2008, from Credo Reference) There is little information about her relationship with her mother.

She was educated irregularly but early became unusually well versed in literature, music, and the arts. She graduated from Radcliffe College in 1918 under the tutelage of Elmer Ernest Southard, an eminent Harvard scholar, who initiated her interest in psychology. Rejected by Harvard University because of her gender, Brunswick went to Tufts Medical School, where she finally received her M. D. cum laude in 1922.

== Marriage ==
In 1917, she married Dr. Herman Blumgart, who later pursued a successful career as a heart specialist. His brother Leonard had gone to Vienna for a short analysis with Sigmund Freud at the end of World War I. Ruth had completed her psychiatric residency when, at the age of twenty-five, she also went to Freud. Her marriage was already troubled; her husband saw Freud in an unsuccessful effort to salvage the marriage, but Freud evidently decided the relationship was hopeless.

Ruth had fallen in love with a man five years younger than herself, and got married a second time in March 1928 to Mark Brunswick, an American composer. Ruth was still in analysis with Freud in 1924 when Mark as well began to consult Freud. According to Mark, Freud later admitted that it had been a mistake for Freud and Ruth to have discussed Mark's case in detail. This marriage also resulted in divorce.

== Working with Sigmund Freud ==
Her most fascinating period as a psychologist took place in Vienna where she was psychoanalyzed by Sigmund Freud. Later she became an intimate member of Freud's circle of psychoanalysts, where she played an important role as a mediator between American analysts and Freud's circle (James, et al., 1971). Ruth Brunswick had a place in Freud's life which few if any of his biographers have noted (Freeman & Strean, 1987). She became his favorite collaborator, and both were inseparable. Anna Freud herself expressed her discontent with (and jealousy of) Brunswick's privileged to Freud's researches. For years, rumors of their fierce rivalry flooded the psychoanalyst circles. This rivalry was exacerbated when Freud gave Brunswick access to one of his most illustrious patients, the "Wolf-man", which Anna was also expecting to have. Brunswick was charming, intelligent, feminine, and vivacious (James, et al., 1971). Her generosity drove her to help many of her friends to leave Austria once the Nazis invaded it. She herself had to leave Vienna to save her own life. Brunswick pioneered the psychoanalytic treatment of psychoses, and the study of emotional development between young children and their mothers, and the importance of this relationship in the genesis of mental illness.

== Death ==
Brunswick was suffering from a gastrointestinal illness that led her to overuse painkillers and other drugs. By 1933, she developed a total dependency on opiates. She died in New York on January 24, 1946, as a result of falling in the bathroom while intoxicated with opiates. The American Journal of Psychoanalysis only wrote that "She had a sudden tragic death" (Freeman & Strean, 1987).
