= Some Character-Types Met with in Psycho-Analytic Work =

1916 essay by Sigmund Freud

"Some Character-Types Met within Psycho-Analytic Work" is an essay by Sigmund Freud from 1916, comprising three character studies—of what he called 'The Exceptions', 'Those Wrecked by Success' and 'Criminals from a Sense of Guilt'.

Freud described as the 'Exceptions' those who because of early narcissistic injury felt that they were subsequently entitled to special privileges in life, in ongoing compensation. His description has been extended to include an early sadomasochism in the experience of being victimised.

Freud explored the paradox whereby people become neurotic or punish themselves through illness, not as a result of failure but of success, illustrating his theme by way of Ibsen's Rosmersholm, among other examples. He saw the cause as an intense (if unconscious) sense of guilt, which sought relief in the punishment of suffering from what is felt as an unjustified degree of success.

In the shortest of his three studies, Freud highlighted the way an unconscious guilt feeling could precede, indeed precipitate a criminal act—providing a feeling of relief that the guilt-feeling could at least be attached to something concrete. However such rationalisation may backfire, leading to a vicious circle of guilt/crime/increased guilt/further crime. Behind such driven guilt, Freud saw the ambivalence and sense of omnipotence underlying the Oedipus complex—themes taken up and extended by Melanie Klein.

Freud adopted Nietzsche's term 'Pale Criminal' for such figures, though its appropriateness has sometimes been challenged.
