= Studies on Hysteria =

1895 book by Sigmund Freud and Josef Breuer

- Cover of the German edition
- Author: Sigmund Freud
- Original title: Studien über Hysterie
- Language: German
- Subject: Hysteria

Studies on Hysteria (German: Studien über Hysterie) is an 1895 book by Sigmund Freud, the founder of psychoanalysis, and the physician Josef Breuer. It consists of a joint introductory paper (reprinted from 1893), followed by five individual studies of hysterics: Breuer's famous case of Anna O. (real name: Bertha Pappenheim), seminal for the development of psychoanalysis, and four more by Freud, including his evaluation of Emmy von N, and finishing with a theoretical essay by Breuer and a more practice-oriented one on therapy by Freud.

== Summary ==
Freud sees symptomology as stratified in an almost geological way, with the outermost strata being easily remembered and accepted, while “the deeper one goes the more difficult it is to recognize the recollections that are surfacing”.

== Reception and influence ==
Breuer's work with Bertha Pappenheim provided the founding impetus for psychoanalysis, as Freud himself would acknowledge. In their preliminary (1893) paper, both men agreed that “the hysteric suffers mainly from reminiscences”. Freud however would come to lay more stress on the causative role of sexuality in producing hysteria, as well as gradually repudiating Breuer's use of hypnosis as a means of treatment. Some of the theoretical scaffolding of the Studies – "strangulated affect", hypnoid state – would be abandoned with the crystallisation of psychoanalysis as an independent technique. However, many of Freud’s clinical observations – on mnemic symbols or deferred action for example – would continue to be confirmed in his later work. At the same time, Breuer’s theoretical essay, with its examination of the principle of constancy, and its differentiation of bound and mobile cathexis, would continue to inform Freud’s thinking as late as the twenties and the writing of Beyond the Pleasure Principle.

At the time of its release, Studies on Hysteria tended to polarise opinion, both within and outside by the medical community. While many were critical, Havelock Ellis offered an appreciative account, while a leading Viennese paper would characterise the work as “the kind of psychology used by poets”. Studies on Hysteria received a positive review from psychiatrist Eugen Bleuler, although Bleuler nevertheless suggested that the results Freud and Breuer reported could have been the result of suggestion.

== Criticism ==
=== Anna von Lieben ===
Freud's later critics have argued that his continuing treatment of Anna von Lieben, given awareness of her incurability, amounted to using her as a kind of cash-cow.

Freud continued during the six years of psychoanalysis to treat her continuously with injections of morphine without any success or therapeutic result.

=== Anna O. ===
The philosopher Mikkel Borch-Jacobsen and the psychologist Sonu Shamdasani comment that Studies on Hysteria gave Freud, "a certain local and international notoriety". Borch-Jacobsen and Shamdasani write that, contrary to what Freud and Breuer claimed, Freud "always knew that the treatment of Bertha Pappenheim...had not been an unmitigated success".

In 1996, Mikkel Borch-Jacobsen completed a treatise on the case of Bertha Pappenheim, "Anna O.", subtitled Une mystification centenaire ("A 100-year-old mystification"), in which, according to Claude Meyer, he "met un terme à l'un des mythes fondateurs de la psychanalyse" ("put an end to one of the founding myths of psychoanalysis"). It is also the opinion of Elizabeth Loentz, who had also written a book on Pappenheim, and Paul Roazen, who considers this work a major stage of university and historiographical work on psychoanalysis, and a fly in the ointment of the "defenders of the status quo". By contrast, Richard Skues rejects the claim that Anna O. was not cured, arguing that critics "have unfairly maligned the truthfulness and integrity of Josef Breuer".

== Translations ==
There are currently three English translations of Studies on Hysteria, the first by A. A. Brill (1937), the second by James Strachey (1955), included in the Standard Edition, and the third by Nicola Luckhurst (2004):

- Breuer, Joseph – Freud, Sigmund: Studies in Hysteria. Authorized Translation with an Introduction by A. A. Brill. (Nervous and Mental Disease Monograph Series No. 61.) Nervous and Mental Disease Publishing, New York 1937.
- Breuer, Josef – Freud, Sigmund: Studies on Hysteria. Translated from the German and edited by James Strachey. (The Standard Edition of the Complete Psychological Works of Sigmund Freud, Vol. II.) Hogarth Press, London 1955.
- Freud, Sigmund – Breuer, Joseph: Studies in Hysteria. Translated by Nicola Luckhurst. Penguin Books, London 2004. ISBN 978-0-141-18482-1

== See also ==
- Cäcilie M.
- Emma Eckstein
- Hypnotic induction
- Pierre Janet
- Talking cure
- Psychoanalytic theory
