= Totem and Taboo =

1913 book by Sigmund Freud

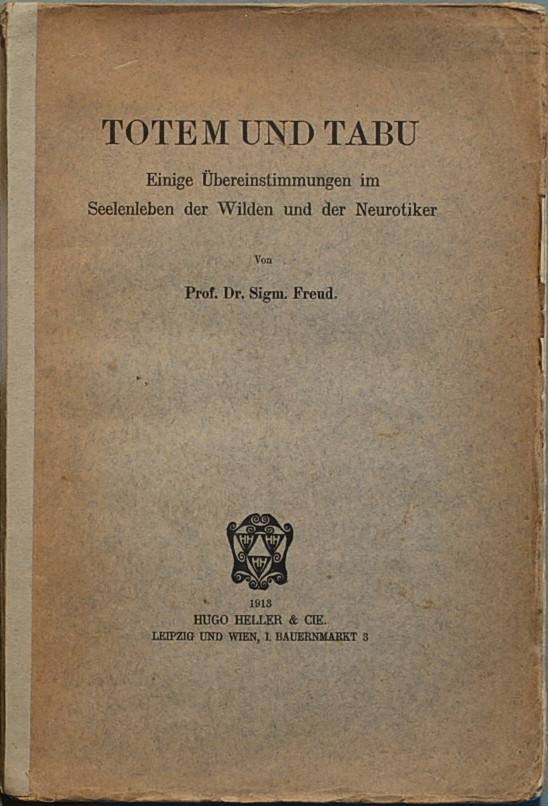
- Cover of the first edition
- Author: Sigmund Freud
- Original title: Totem und Tabu: Einige Übereinstimmungen im Seelenleben der Wilden und der Neurotiker
- Translators: Abraham Brill; James Strachey
- Language: German
- Subject: Anthropology, archaeology, psychoanalysis
- Publisher: Beacon Press
- Publication date: 1913
- Media type: Print
- Text: Totem and Taboo at Wikisource

Totem and Taboo: Resemblances Between the Mental Lives of Savages and Neurotics, or Totem and Taboo: Some Points of Agreement between the Mental Lives of Savages and Neurotics (German: Totem und Tabu: Einige Übereinstimmungen im Seelenleben der Wilden und der Neurotiker), is a 1913 book by Sigmund Freud, the founder of psychoanalysis, in which the author applies his work to the fields of archaeology, anthropology, and the study of religion. It is a collection of four essays inspired by the work of Wilhelm Wundt and Carl Jung and first published in the journal Imago (1912–13): "The Horror of Incest", "Taboo and Emotional Ambivalence", "Animism, Magic and the Omnipotence of Thoughts", and "The Return of Totemism in Childhood". Freud would expand on this theme in Moses and Monotheism

Though Totem and Taboo has been seen as one of the classics of anthropology, comparable to Edward Burnett Tylor's Primitive Culture (1871) and Sir James George Frazer's The Golden Bough (1890), the work is now hotly debated by anthropologists. The cultural anthropologist Alfred L. Kroeber was an early critic of Totem and Taboo, publishing a critique of the work in 1920. Some authors have seen redeeming value in the work.

== Background ==
Freud, who had a longstanding interest in social anthropology and was devoted to the study of archaeology and prehistory, wrote that the work of Wilhelm Wundt and Carl Jung provided him with his "first stimulus" to write the essays included in Totem and Taboo. The work was translated twice into English, first by Abraham Brill and later by James Strachey. Freud was influenced by the work of James George Frazer, including The Golden Bough (1890).

== Summary ==
=== Chapter 1 ===
"The Horror of Incest" concerns incest taboos adopted by societies believing in totemism.

Freud examines the system of Totemism among Aboriginal Australians. Every clan has a totem (usually an animal, sometimes a plant or force of nature) and people are not allowed to marry those with the same totem as themselves. Freud examines this practice as preventing against incest. The totem is passed down hereditarily, either through the father or the mother. The relationship of father is also not just his father, but every man in the clan that, hypothetically, could have been his father. He relates this to the idea of young children calling all of their parents' friends aunts and uncles. There are also further marriage classes, sometimes as many as eight, that group the totems together, and therefore limit a man's choice of partners. He also talks about the widespread practices amongst the cultures of the Pacific Islands and Africa of avoidance. Many cultures do not allow brothers and sisters to interact in any way, generally after puberty. Men are not allowed to be alone with their mothers-in-law or say each other's names. He explains this by saying that after a certain age parents often live through their children to endure their marriage and that mothers-in-law may become overly attached to their son-in-law. Similar restrictions exist between a father and daughter, but they only exist from puberty until engagement.

=== Chapter 2 ===
In "Taboo and emotional ambivalence," Freud considers the relationship of taboos to totemism. Freud uses his concepts projection and ambivalence, developed during his work with neurotic patients in Vienna, to discuss the relationship between taboo and totemism.

Like neurotics, 'primitive' people feel ambivalent about most people in their lives, but will not admit this consciously to themselves. They will not admit that, as much as they love their mother, there are things about her that they hate. The suppressed part of this ambivalence (the hate parts) are projected onto others. In the case of natives, the hateful parts are projected onto the totem, as in: 'I did not want my mother to die; the totem wanted her to die.'

Freud expands this idea of ambivalence to include the relationship of citizens to their ruler. In ceremonies surrounding kings, which are often quite violent (such as the king starving himself in the woods for a few weeks), he considers two levels that are functioning to be the "ostensible" (i.e., the king is being honored) and the "actual" (i.e., the king is being tortured). He uses examples to illustrate the taboos on rulers. He says that the kings of Ireland were subject to restrictions such as not being able to go to certain towns or on certain days of the week.

=== Chapter 3 ===
In "Animism, Magic and the Omnipotence of Thought" Freud examines the animism and narcissistic phase associated with a primitive understanding of the universe and early libidinal development. A belief in magic and sorcery derives from an overvaluation of psychical acts, whereby the structural conditions of mind are transposed onto the world: this overvaluation survives in both primitive men and neurotics. The animistic mode of thinking is governed by an "omnipotence of thoughts", a projection of inner mental life onto the external world. This imaginary construction of reality is also discernible in obsessive thinking, delusional disorders and phobias. Freud comments that the omnipotence of thoughts has been retained in the magical realm of art. The last part of the essay concludes the relationship between magic (paranormal), superstition and taboo, arguing that the practices of animism are merely a cover up of instinctual repression (Freud).

=== Chapter 4 ===
In "The Return of Totemism in Childhood" Freud combines one of Charles Darwin's more speculative theories about the arrangements of early human societies (a single alpha-male surrounded by a harem of females, similar to the arrangement of gorilla groupings) with the theory of the sacrifice ritual taken from William Robertson Smith to conclude that the origins of totemism lie in a singular event, when a band of prehistoric brothers expelled from the alpha-male group returned to kill their father, whom they both feared and respected. In this respect, Freud located the beginnings of the Oedipus complex at the origins of human society, and postulated that all religion was in effect an extended and collective form of guilt and ambivalence to cope with the killing of the father figure (which he saw as the true original sin).

== Reception ==
=== Early reviews ===
In 1914, Totem and Taboo received a negative review from Carl Furtmüller in Zentralblatt für Psychologie und Psychotherapie. Other reviews written between 1912 and 1920 include those by the psychoanalyst Wilhelm Stekel in Zentralblatt für Psychologie und Psychotherapie, the neurologist and psychiatrist William Alanson White in Psychoanalytic Review, the biographer Francis Hackett in The New Republic, the psychologist William McDougall in Mind, and the anthropologist Alfred L. Kroeber in American Anthropologist.

Furtmüller wrote that the work showed Freud's increasing "isolation from the scientific world". He accused Freud of ignoring criticisms directed against his theories, and objected to Freud's basing his investigations on the theory of the Oedipus complex. He credited Freud with providing a "compact survey" of the confusing state of research into totemism, but believed that it was difficult for psychoanalysts to deal with the subject because they could not base their conclusions on "first-hand experience", and that Freud attached too much importance to "the belief of totemistic acolytes that they are descendants of the totem animal". He criticized Freud's attempt to explain totemism through parallels with the "psychological life" of children, arguing that the analytical results Freud employed were of questionable accuracy and did little to provide a "solution of the problem of totemism", and that Freud failed to explain why the totem was represented as an animal. He also considered Freud wrong to consider exogamy one of the most important features of totemism. Though believing that Freud showed "sharp wit", he accused him of engaging in "the free play of fantasy" where "logical argumentation" was needed and of misunderstanding the work of Darwin. He wrote that Freud explained morality as the "product of a social contract" and compared the Oedipus complex to the "original sin of the human race".

=== Views of anthropologists ===
Totem and Taboo became widely known in the United States by the end of World War I. According to Annemarie De Waal Malefijt, the book produced "angry reactions" from anthropologists even on the basis of its subtitle alone. Anthropologist critics of Totem and Taboo included Kroeber, who described Freud as a "gallant and stimulating adventurer into ethnology" but rejected the idea that Freud's theories could explain social origins and evolutionary phases, Franz Boas, who considered Freud's method in Totem and Taboo one-sided and useless for advancing understanding of cultural development, and Robert Ranulph Marett, who referred to the work as a "just-so story". Claude Lévi-Strauss criticized Totem and Taboo in his The Elementary Structures of Kinship (1948).

Kroeber published a reassessment of Totem and Taboo in 1952. Marvin Harris described Totem and Taboo as representative of what Boas's followers regarded as "the worst form of evolutionary speculation", criticizing "the grandiosity of its compass, the flimsiness of its evidence ... the generality of its conclusions" and its "anachronistic framework". In his view, nothing about the work prepared "orthodox Freudians" to deal with the variety of culturally determined personality structures revealed by the work of Bronisław Malinowski, Margaret Mead, and Ruth Benedict. Peter Farb wrote that Totem and Taboo "demonstrates the lengths to which a theorist will go to find an explanation" for totemism, adding that despite their disagreements on other issues, anthropologists by 1968 concurred that the work is "totally discredited".

=== Views of psychoanalysts ===
Géza Róheim, an anthropologist as well as a psychoanalyst, considered Totem and Taboo one of the great landmarks in the history of anthropology, comparable only to Edward Burnett Tylor's Primitive Culture (1871) and Sir James George Frazer's The Golden Bough (1890). Róheim described Totem and Taboo as an "epoch-making work" in both anthropology and the social sciences generally. Róheim eventually abandoned the assumptions of Totem and Taboo, but continued to regard it as a classic, the work that created psychoanalytic anthropology. Wilhelm Reich, following Johann Jakob Bachofen and other authors, maintained that early human societies were matriarchies and that this ruled out Freud's account of the origins of civilization in Totem and Taboo. Reich argued that Freud's theory that the Oedipus complex was a prime factor in the development of civilization ignored the cultural relativity of the Oedipus complex, which, drawing on the work of Malinowski, he saw as only a result of the patriarchal order.

Freud himself considered "The Return of Totemism in Childhood" his best-written work, and Totem and Taboo as a whole remained one of his favorite works.

=== Other responses ===
The classicist Jane Ellen Harrison called Totem and Taboo one of the most important works in her intellectual life. Harrison's work Themis: A Study of the Social Origins of Greek Religion (1912) has been compared to Totem and Taboo, since Harrison and Freud both attempted to find a universal mechanism that would account for the origins of religion. The novelist Thomas Mann wrote that Totem and Taboo had made a stronger impression on him than any of Freud's other works, and that of all Freud's works it had the greatest artistic merit. The feminist Simone de Beauvoir criticized Totem and Taboo in The Second Sex (1949), writing that Freud is forced to "invent strange fictions" to explain the passage from "the individual to the society"; she saw the inability to explain this transition as a failing of psychoanalysis. Georges Bataille argued that Freud was misled by the "superficial knowledge of ethnographical data" typical of his time into concluding that the taboo on touching corpses generally countered a desire to touch them.

The classicist Norman O. Brown criticized the work in Life Against Death (1959), writing that Freud correlates psycho-sexual stages of development with stages of history, thereby seeing history as a "process of growing up". Brown saw this view as a "residue of eighteenth-century optimism and rationalism", and found it inadequate as both history and psychoanalysis. The mythologist Joseph Campbell considered Freud's Totem and Taboo and Jung's Psychology of the Unconscious (1912) the two key works that initiated the systematic interpretation of ethnological materials through insights gained through the study of neurotic individuals. The critic René Girard wrote in Violence and the Sacred (1972) that, despite the rejection of Totem and Taboo by "contemporary criticism", its concept of collective murder is close to the themes of his own work.

The historian Peter Gay suggested in Freud: A Life for Our Time (1988) that in Totem and Taboo Freud made conjectures more ingenious than those of the philosopher Jean-Jacques Rousseau. Gay observed that Totem and Taboo was in part an attempt by Freud to outdo his rival Jung, and that the work is full of evidence that "Freud's current combats reverberated with his past history, conscious and unconscious". The critic Harold Bloom asserted in The American Religion (1992) that Totem and Taboo has no greater acceptance among anthropologists than does the Book of Mormon, and that there are parallels between the two works, such as a concern with polygamy.

Richard Schechner criticized Freud for having assumed in Totem and Taboo that some humans are more "primitive" than others. The psychologist David P. Barash concluded that in Totem and Taboo Freud "combines idiosyncratic, almost crackpot fantasy with startling profundity and originality". Anthony Elliott argued that Freud's account of social and cultural organization suffers from limitations, and that, because of anthropological knowledge that became available subsequent to Totem and Taboo, the theories Freud proposed there now have few advocates. Elliott wrote that "Freud's attempt to anchor the Oedipus complex in a foundational event displaces his crucial insights into the radically creative power of the human imagination", ascribing to real events "what are in fact products of fantasy". Elliott added that Freud should be credited with showing that "reality is not pre-given or natural", but rather structured by the social and technical frameworks fashioned by human beings, and that "individual subjectivity and society presuppose one another".

Dominique Bourdin wrote that in Totem and Taboo Freud "develops an idea that clearly embarrasses the current psychoanalysts, but that is essential to the logic of Freudian thought: that of Phylogenetics". The philosopher Mikkel Borch-Jacobsen and the psychologist Sonu Shamdasani argued that in Totem and Taboo Freud applied to history "the same method of interpretation that he used in the privacy of his office to 'reconstruct' his patients' forgotten and repressed memories".

== See also ==
- Guy Rosolato
- Little Arpad
- Psychoanalytic sociology
