= Narcissistic mortification =

Psychoanalysis concept

Narcissistic mortification is a concept in psychoanalysis that "the primitive terror of self dissolution, triggered by the sudden exposure of one's sense of a defective self ... it is death by embarrassment". The concept has been widely employed in ego psychology and also contributed to the roots of self psychology.

When narcissistic mortification is experienced for the first time, it may be defined as a sudden loss of control over external or internal reality, or both. This produces strong emotions of terror while at the same time narcissistic libido (also known as ego-libido) or destrudo is built up. Narcissistic libido or ego-libido is the concentration of libido on the self. Destrudo is the opposite of libido and is the impulse to destroy oneself and everything associated with oneself.

== Early developments: Bergler, Anna Freud, and Eidelberg ==
Edmund Bergler developed the concept of narcissistic mortification in connection with early fantasies of omnipotence in the developing child, and with the fury provoked by the confrontations with reality that undermine his or her illusions. For Bergler, "the narcissistic mortification suffered in this very early period continues to act as a stimulus throughout his life".

Anna Freud used the term in connection with her exploration of the defence mechanism of altruistic surrender, whereby an individual lives only through the lives of others – seeing at the root of such an abrogation of one's own life an early experience of narcissistic mortification at a disappointment with one's self.

Psychoanalyst and author Ludwig Eidelberg subsequently expanded on the concept in the fifties and sixties. Eidelberg defined narcissistic mortification as occurring when "a sudden loss of control over external or internal reality...produces the painful emotional experience of terror". He also stated that for many patients simply to have to accept themselves as having neurotic symptoms was itself a trigger of narcissistic mortification.

== Kohut and self psychology ==
For Kohut, narcissistic injury – the root cause of what he termed narcissistic personality disorder – was broadly equivalent to the humiliation of mortification. Kohut considered that "if the grandiosity of the narcissistic self has been insufficiently modified ... then the adult ego will tend to vacillate between an irrational overestimation of the self and feelings of inferiority and will react with narcissistic mortification to the thwarting of its ambitions".

Following Kohut's theories, the narcissistic individual shifts between an illogical exaggeration of one's own abilities and unreasonable feelings of inadequacy. Also, depends on other people to control his/her sense of self-worth and provide him/her with a sense of value. Thus, Kohut suggests assisting the patient in regaining these lost abilities throughout therapy. Furthermore, he also suggests that for the patient to feel understood, the therapist should temporarily inhabit the role of the patient and compassionately perceive the world from that point of view.

== Object relations theory ==
Unlike ego psychologists, object relations theorists have traditionally used a rather different, post-Kleinian terminology to describe the early wounding of narcissistic mortification. Recently, however such theorists have found analogies between Freud's emphasis on the sensitivity of the ego to narcissistic humiliation and mortification, and the views of Bion on 'nameless dread' or Winnicott's on the original agonies of the breakdown of childhood consciousness. At the same time ego psychologists have been increasingly prepared to see narcissistic mortification as occurring in the context of early relations to objects.

== Physical sensations and psychological perceptions ==
An individual’s experience of mortification may be accompanied by both physical and psychological sensations. Physical sensations such as burning, painful tingling over the body, pain in the chest that slowly expands and spreads throughout the torso, dizziness, nausea, vomiting, sweating, blanching, coldness and numbness can be experienced by the individual suffering from mortification. The psychological sensations described are feeling shocked, exposed, and humiliated. Descriptions of this experience can be, for example: “It feels like I won’t survive” and “I have the absolute conviction that he or she hates me and it’s my fault”. These sensations are always followed by shock, although they may have happened on various occasions, they also prompt the need for the suffering individual to do something both internally and externally, to effect a positive self-image in the eyes of their narcissistic object. Narcissistic mortification is extreme in its intensity, totality, and lack of perspective and context, causing the anxiety associated with it to become traumatic.

== Normal versus pathological ==
In Eidelberg's view, a normal individual would usually be able to avoid being overwhelmed by internal needs because they recognize these urges in time to bring about their partial discharge. However, Eidelberg does not view occasional outbursts of temper as a sign of disorder. An individual experiencing pathological narcissistic mortification is prone to become fixated on infantile objects, resulting in an infantile form of discharge. He or she cannot be satisfied by the partial discharge of this energy, which takes place on an unconscious level, and this in turn interferes with their well-being. According to Eidelberg, the denial of an infantile narcissistic mortification can be responsible for many defensive mechanisms.

=== Internal versus external ===
Narcissistic mortification can be:

- Internal – occurs when an individual is overstimulated by their emotions. For example, while debating with classmates on the importance of stem cell research an outspoken student loses his temper causing an uproar. The student has just exhibited an overstimulation of his emotions and used this outburst to relieve internal tension.
- External – occurs when something out of one's control influences a situation, for example, an individual who is held at gunpoint while having their wallet stolen. This individual does not hold any control over the scenario nor the actions of the gunman, but their reaction to being held at gunpoint influences the next scenario and what the gunman does next.

== In cult leadership ==
To escape the narcissistic mortification of accepting their own dependency needs, cult leaders may resort to delusions of omnipotence. Their continuing shame and underlying guilt, and their repudiation of dependency, obliges such leaders to use seduction and manic defenses to externalize and locate dependency needs in others, thus making their followers controllable through a displaced sense of shame.

== Death, anxiety, and suicide ==
Because in Western culture death is sometimes seen as the ultimate loss of control, fear of it may produce death anxiety in the form of a sense of extreme shame or narcissistic mortification. The shame in this context is produced by the loss of stoicism, productivity, and control, aspects that are highly valued by society and aspects that are taken away as one ages. Death, according to Darcy Harris, "is the ultimate narcissistic wound, bringing about not just the annihilation of self, but the annihilation of one's entire existence, resulting in a form of existential shame for human beings, who possess the ability to ponder this dilemma with their higher functioning cognitive abilities."

Individuals who hold this anxiety are ashamed of mortality and the frailty that comes along with it; and may attempt to overcome this reality through diversions and accomplishments, deflecting feelings of inferiority and shame through strategies like grandiosity in a similar fashion to those with narcissistic personality traits.

Narcissistic mortification may also be produced by the death of someone close. Such a loss of an essential object may even lead through narcissistic mortification to suicide.

Among the many motives behind suicidal activities in general are shame, loss of honor, and narcissistic mortification. Those who suffer from narcissistic mortification are more likely to participate in suicidal behaviors and those who do not receive the proper help more often than not succeed. Suicide related to narcissistic mortification is different from normal sorrow in that it is associated with deep-rooted self-contempt and self-hatred.

== Treatment ==
According to a paper authored by Mary Libbey, "On Narcissistic Mortification", presented at the 2006 Shame Symposium, long-term goal of psychoanalytic treatment for those who suffer from narcissistic mortification is to transform the mortification into shame. She says by transforming it into shame it enables the sufferer to tolerate and use it as a signal; the process of transforming mortification into shame entails working through both the early mortifying traumas and the defenses, often unstable, related to them. If an individual sufferer does not go through this transformation, he or she is left with two unstable narcissistic defenses. Libbey says these defenses are: self-damning, deflated states designed to appease and hold on to self-objects, and narcissistic conceit, which is designed to project the defective self experiences onto self-objects. Both of these defensive styles require a continuation of dependence on the self-object. Transforming the mortification into shame makes it possible for self-appraisal and self-tolerance, this ultimately leads to psychic separation and self-reliance without the need to sustain one's mortification, according to Libbey's paper.

== In the 21st century ==
Postmodern Freudians link narcissistic mortification to Winnicott's theory of primitive mental states which lack the capacity for symbolisation, and their need for re-integration. Returning in the transference to the intolerable mortification underpinning such narcissistic defences can however also produce positive analytic change, by way of the (albeit mortifying) re-experience of overwhelming object loss within an intersubjective holding environment.

21st century American analysts are particularly concerned with the potential production of narcissistic mortification as a by-product of analytic interpretation, especially with regard to masochistic personality disorder.

== Literary uses ==
Narcissistic mortification at injuries to self-esteem has been seen as pervading Captain Ahab's motivations in his confrontation with Moby-Dick.

Mortification at one's self is seen in Frankenstein, when the Creature stares at his reflection in a pool of water. This is where he becomes convinced that he is in fact the Creature and becomes filled with despondence and mortification.

== See also ==
- Narcissism
- Narcissistic parents
- Narcissistic personality disorder
- Narcissistic supply
- Narcissistic withdrawal
