= Collective narcissism =

Psychological tendency to exaggerate the positive image of one's social group

In social psychology, collective narcissism (or group narcissism) is the tendency to exaggerate the positive image and importance of a group to which one belongs. While the classic definition of narcissism focuses on the individual, collective narcissism extends this concept to similar excessively high opinions of a person's social group, and suggests that a group can function as a narcissistic entity.

Collective narcissism is related to ethnocentrism. While ethnocentrism is an assertion of the ingroup's supremacy, collective narcissism is a self-defensive tendency to invest unfulfilled self-entitlement into a belief in an ingroup's uniqueness and greatness. Thus, the ingroup is expected to become a vehicle of actualisation of frustrated self-entitlement. In addition, ethnocentrism primarily focuses on self-centeredness at an ethnic or cultural level, while collective narcissism is extended to any type of ingroup.

Collective narcissism is associated with intergroup hostility.

== Development of the concept ==
In Sigmund Freud's 1922 study Group Psychology and the Analysis of the Ego, he noted how every little canton looks down upon the others with contempt, as an instance of what would later to be termed Freud's theory of collective narcissism. Wilhelm Reich and Isaiah Berlin explored what the latter called the rise of modern national narcissism: the self-adoration of peoples. "Group narcissism" is described in a 1973 book entitled The Anatomy of Human Destructiveness by psychologist Erich Fromm. In the 1990s, Pierre Bourdieu wrote of a sort of collective narcissism affecting intellectual groups, inclining them to turn a complacent gaze on themselves. Noting how people's desire to see their own groups as better than other groups can lead to intergroup bias, Henri Tajfel approached the same phenomena in the seventies and eighties, so as to create social identity theory, which argues that people's motivation to obtain positive self-esteem from their group memberships is one driving-force behind in-group bias. The term "collective narcissism" was highlighted anew by researcher Agnieszka Golec de Zavala who created the Collective Narcissism Scale and developed research on intergroup and political consequences of collective narcissism. People who score high on the Collective Narcissists Scale agree that their group's importance and worth are not sufficiently recognised by others and that their group deserves special treatment. They insist that their group must obtain special recognition and respect.

The Scale was modelled on the Narcissistic Personality Inventory. However, collective and individual narcissism are modestly correlated. Only collective narcissism predicts intergroup behaviours and attitudes. Collective narcissism is related to vulnerable narcissism (individual narcissism manifesting as distrustful and neurotic interpersonal style), and grandiose narcissism (individual narcissism manifesting as exceedingly self-aggrandising interpersonal style) and to low self-esteem. This is in line with the theorising of Theodore Adorno who proposed that collective narcissism motivated support for the Nazi politics in Germany and was a response to undermined sense of self-worth.

== Characteristics and consequences ==
Collective narcissism is characterized by the members of a group holding an inflated view of their ingroup which requires constant external validation. Collective narcissism can be exhibited by an individual on behalf of any social group or by a group as a whole. Research participants found that they could apply statements of the Collective Narcissism Scale to various groups: national, ethnic, religious, ideological, political, students of the same university, fans of the same football team, professional groups, and organizations. Collectively narcissistic groups require external validation, just as individual narcissists do. Organizations and groups who exhibit this behavior typically try to protect their identities through rewarding group-building behavior (this is positive reinforcement).

Collective narcissism predicts retaliatory hostility to past, present, actual and imagined offences to the ingroup and negative attitudes towards groups perceived as threatening. It predicts constantly feeling threatened in intergroup situations that require a stretch of imagination to be perceived as insulting or threatening. For example, in Turkey, collective narcissists felt humiliated by the Turkish wait to be admitted to the European Union. After a transgression as petty as a joke made by a Polish celebrity about the country's government, Polish collective narcissists threatened physical punishment and openly rejoiced in the misfortunes of the "offender". Collective narcissism predicts conspiracy thinking about secretive malevolent actions of outgroups.

== Collective vs. individual ==
Individual/Collective Narcissism Equivalencies
Individualists on themselves	Individualists on collectivists
You wish people would recognize your authority.	They wish others would recognize their group's authority.
You have natural talent for influencing people.	Their group has all predispositions to influence others.
If you ruled the world, it would be a much better place.	If their group ruled the world, it would be a much better place.
You are extraordinary.	Their group is extraordinary.
You like to be the center of attention.	They like when their group is the center of attention.
You will never be satisfied until you get all that you deserve.	They will never be satisfied until their group gets all that it deserves.
You insist upon getting the respect that is due you.	They insist upon their group getting the respect that is due it.
You want to amount to something in the eyes of the world.	They want their group to amount to something in the eyes of the world.
People never give you enough recognition for the things you've done.	Not many people seem to understand the full importance of their group.

There are several connections, and intricate relationships between collective and individual narcissism, or between individual narcissism stemming from group identities or activities, however no single relationship between groups and individuals is conclusive or universally applicable. In some cases, collective narcissism is an individual's idealization of the ingroup to which they belong, while in another the idealization of the group takes place at a more group-level, rather than an instillation within each individual member of the group. In some cases, one might project the idealization of himself onto his group, while in another case, the development of individual narcissism might stem from being associated with a prestigious, accomplished, or extraordinary group.

An example of the first case listed above is that of national identity. One might feel a great sense of love and respect for one's nation, flag, people, city, or governmental systems as a result of a collectively narcissistic perspective. It must be remembered that these feelings are not explicitly the result of collective narcissism, and that collective narcissism is not explicitly the cause of patriotism, or any other group-identifying expression. However, glorification of one's group (such as a nation) can be seen in some cases as a manifestation of collective narcissism.

In the case where the idealization of self is projected onto ones group, group-level narcissism tends to be less binding than in other cases. Typically in this situation the individual—already individually narcissistic—uses a group to enhance his own self-perceived quality, and by identifying positively with the group and actively building it up, the narcissist is enhancing simultaneously both his own self-worth, and his group's worth. However, because the link tends to be weaker, individual narcissists seeking to raise themselves up through a group will typically dissociate themselves from a group they feel is damaging to their image, or that is not improving proportionally to the amount of support they are investing in the group.

Involvement in one's group has also been shown to be a factor in the level of collective narcissism exhibited by members of a group. Typically a more involved member of a group is more likely to exhibit a higher opinion of the group. This results from an increased affinity for the group as one becomes more involved, as well as a sense of investment or contribution to the success of the group. Also, another perspective asserts that individual narcissism is related to collective narcissism exhibited by individual group members. Personal narcissists, seeing their group as a defining extension of themselves, will defend their group (collective narcissism) more avidly than a non-narcissist, to preserve their own perceived social standing along with their group's. In this vein, a problem is presented; for while an individual narcissist will be heroic in defending his or her ingroup during intergroup conflicts, he or she may be a larger burden on the ingroup in intragroup situations by demanding admiration, and exhibiting more selfish behavior on the intragroup level—individual narcissism.

Conversely, another relationship between collective narcissism and the individual can be established with individuals who have a low or damaged ego investing their image in the well-being of their group, which bears strong resemblance to the "ideal-hungry" followers in the charismatic leader-follower relationship. As discussed, these ego-damaged group-investors seek solace in belonging to a group; however, a strong charismatic leader is not always requisite for someone weak to feel strength by building up a narcissistic opinion of their own group.

== Charismatic leader-follower relationship ==
Another sub-concept encompassed by collective narcissism is that of the "charismatic leader-follower relationship" theorized by political psychologist Jerrold Post. Post takes the view that collective narcissism is exhibited as a collection of individual narcissists, and discusses how this type of relationship emerges when a narcissistic charismatic leader, appeals to narcissistic "ideal-hungry" followers.

An important characteristic of the leader follower-relationship are the manifestations of narcissism by both the leader and follower of a group. Within this relationship there are two categories of narcissists: the mirror-hungry narcissist, and the ideal-hungry narcissist—the leader and the followers respectively. The mirror-hungry personality typically seeks a continuous flow of admiration and respect from his followers. Conversely, the ideal-hungry narcissist takes comfort in the charisma and confidence of his mirror-hungry leader. The relationship is somewhat symbiotic; for while the followers provide the continuous admiration needed by the mirror-hungry leader, the leader's charisma provides the followers with the sense of security and purpose that their ideal-hungry narcissism seeks. Fundamentally both the leader and the followers exhibit strong collectively narcissistic sentiments—both parties are seeking greater justification and reason to love their group as much as possible.

Perhaps the most significant example of this phenomenon would be that of Nazi Germany. Adolf Hitler's charisma and polarizing speeches satisfied the German people's hunger for a strong leader. Hitler's speeches were characterized by their emphasis on "strength"—referring to Germany—and "weakness"—referring to the Jewish people. Some have even described Hitler's speeches as "hypnotic"—even to non-German speakers—and his rallies as "watching hypnosis on large scale". Hitler's charisma convinced the German people to believe that they were not weak, and that by destroying the perceived weakness from among them (the Jews), they would be enhancing their own strength—satisfying their ideal-hungry desire for strength, and pleasing their mirror-hungry charismatic leader.

== Intergroup aggression ==
Collective narcissism has been shown to be a factor in intergroup aggression and bias. Primary components of collectively narcissistic intergroup relations involve aggression against outgroups with which collective narcissistic perceive as threatening. Collective narcissism helps to explain unreasonable manifestations of retaliation between groups. A narcissistic group is more sensitive to perceived criticism exhibited by outgroups, and is therefore more likely to retaliate. Collective narcissism is also related to negativity between groups who share a history of distressing experiences. The members of a narcissistic ingroup are likely to assume threats or negativity towards their ingroup where threats or negativity were not necessarily implied or exhibited. It is thought that this heightened sensitivity to negative feelings towards the ingroup is a result of underlying doubts about the greatness of the ingroup held by its members.

Similar to other elements of collective narcissism, intergroup aggression related to collective narcissism draws parallels with its individually narcissistic counterparts. An individual narcissist might react aggressively in the presence of humiliation, irritation, or anything threatening to his self-image. Likewise, a collective narcissist, or a collectively narcissistic group might react aggressively when the image of the group is in jeopardy, or when the group is collectively humiliated.

A study conducted among 6 to 9 year-olds by Judith Griffiths indicated that ingroups and outgroups among these children functioned relatively identically to other known collectively narcissistic groups in terms of intergroup aggression. The study noted that children generally had a significantly higher opinion of their ingroup than of surrounding outgroups, and that such ingroups indirectly or directly exhibited aggression on surrounding outgroups.

== Ethnocentrism ==
Collective narcissism and ethnocentrism are closely related; they can be positively correlated and often shown to be coexistent, but they are independent in that either can exist without the presence of the other. In a study conducted by Boris Bizumic, some ethnocentrism was shown to be an expression of group-level narcissism. It was noted, however, that not all manifestations of ethnocentrism are narcissistically based, and conversely, not all cases of group-level narcissism are by any means ethnocentric.

It has been suggested that ethnocentrism – when pertaining to discrimination or aggression based on the self-love of one's group; or, in other words, based on exclusion from one's self-perceived superior group – is an expression of collective narcissism. In this sense, it might be said that collective narcissism overlaps with ethnocentrism, depending on given definitions and the breadth of their acceptance.

== In the world ==
In general, collective narcissism is most strongly manifested in groups that are "self-relevant", like religions, nationality, or ethnicity. As discussed earlier, phenomena such as national identity (nationality) and Nazi Germany (ethnicity and nationality) are manifestations of collective narcissism among groups that critically define the people who belong to them.

In addition to this, a group's extant collective narcissism is likely to be exacerbated during conflict and aggression. And in terms of cultural effects, cultures that place an emphasis on the individual are apparently more likely to see manifestations of perceived individual greatness projected onto social ingroups within that culture. And finally, narcissistic groups are not restricted to any one homogenous composition of collective or individually collective or individual narcissists. A quote from Hitler almost ideally sums the actual nature of collective narcissism as it is realistically manifested, and might be found reminiscent of almost every idea presented here: "My group is better and more important than other groups, but still is not worthy of me". Although, this is inconsistent with the interpretation given to collective narcissism by Golec de Zavala and colleagues. Those authors suggest collective narcissists invest their vulnerable self-worth in the exaggerated image of their group and therefore cannot distance themselves from the group through which they achieve self-importance.

== See also ==
- Basking in reflected glory
- Eurocentrism
- Groupthink
- Hubris and group pride
- Narcissism of small differences

== Bibliography ==
- Bourdieu, Pierre (1996). The Rules of Art: Genesis and Structure of the Literary Field. Stanford University Press. ISBN 978-0-8047-2568-2.
- Bychowski, Gustav (1948). Dictators and Disciples. New York: International Universities Press. ISBN 978-0-8236-8029-0.
- Freud, Sigmund (1991) [1930]. Civilization, Society and Religion. Penguin Freud Library. Vol. 12. Translated by Strachey, James. Penguin. ISBN 978-0-14-013791-0.
- Fromm, Eric (1973). The Anatomy of Human Destructiveness. New York: New York, Holt, Rinehart and Winston. ISBN 978-0-03-007596-4.
- |Golec de Zavala, A. (2023). The psychology of collective narcissism: Insights from social identity theory. Routledge.|https://doi.org/10.4324/9781003296577/ref>===
- Hohendahl, Peter Uwe (1997). Prismatic Thought: Theodor W. Adorno. University of Nebraska Press. ISBN 978-0-8032-7305-4.
- Smith, Eliot R.; Mackie, Diane M. (2007). Social Psychology (3rd ed.). Psychology Press. ISBN 978-1-84169-409-2.
- Weaver, Eric Beckett (2006). National Narcissism: The intersection of the nationalist cult and gender in Hungary. Peter Lang AG. ISBN 978-3-03910-726-1.

=== Articles ===
- Bailis, Daniel; Chipperfield, Judith; Helgason, Tiffany (May 2008). "Collective self-esteem and the onset of chronic conditions and reduced activity in a longitudinal study of aging". Social Science & Medicine. 66 (8): 1817–27. doi:10.1016/j.socscimed.2007.12.028. PMID 18243457.
- Baumeister, Roy F.; Bushman, Brad J.; Campbell, W. Keith (February 2000). "Self-Esteem, Narcissism, and Aggression: Does Violence Result From Low Self-Esteem or From Threatened Egotism?". Current Directions in Psychological Science. Psychology and Behavioral Sciences Collection. 9 (1). EBSCO: 26–29. doi:10.1111/1467-8721.00053. S2CID 29914472.
- Bizumic, Boris; Duckitt, John (May 2008). "'My Group Is Not Worthy of Me': Narcissism and Ethnocentrism". Political Psychology. 29 (3). EBSCO: 437–453. doi:10.1111/j.1467-9221.2008.00638.x.
- Bushman, Brad J.; Baumeister, Roy F. (August 1998). "Threatened egotism, narcissism, self-esteem, and direct and displaced aggression: Does self-love or self-hate lead to violence?". Journal of Personality and Social Psychology. 75 (1): 219–229. doi:10.1037/0022-3514.75.1.219. PMID 9686460.
- Duchon, Dennis; Drake, Brian (March 2009). "Organizational Narcissism and Virtuous Behavior". Journal of Business Ethics. 85 (3): 301–308. doi:10.1007/s10551-008-9771-7. S2CID 3563536.
- Golec de Zavala, Agnieszka; Cichocka, Aleksandra; Eidelson, Roy; Jayawickreme, Nuwan (2009). "Collective narcissism and its social consequences" (PDF). Journal of Personality and Social Psychology. 97 (6). EBSCO: 1074–1096. doi:10.1037/a0016904. PMID 19968420. Archived from the original (PDF) on 2018-03-24.
- Golec de Zavala, Agnieszka (2011-06-01). "Collective Narcissism and Intergroup Hostility: The Dark Side of 'In-Group Love'" (PDF). Social and Personality Psychology Compass. 5 (6): 309–320. doi:10.1111/j.1751-9004.2011.00351.x. ISSN 1751-9004. Archived (PDF) from the original on 2017-09-22.
- Golec de Zavala, Agnieszka; Cichocka, Aleksandra (March 2012). "Collective narcissism and anti-Semitism in Poland" (PDF). Group Processes & Intergroup Relations. 15 (2): 213–229. doi:10.1177/1368430211420891. S2CID 143576887. Archived (PDF) from the original on 2018-07-23.
- Golec de Zavala, Agnieszka; Cichocka, Aleksandra; Iskra-Golec, Irena (2013). "Collective narcissism moderates the effect of in-group image threat on intergroup hostility" (PDF). Journal of Personality and Social Psychology. 104 (6): 1019–1039. doi:10.1037/a0032215. hdl:10071/7344. PMID 23586408. Archived (PDF) from the original on 2018-07-22.
- Golec de Zavala, Agnieszka; Dyduch-Hazar, Karolina; Lantos, Dorottya (2019). "Collective Narcissism: Political Consequences of Investing Self-Worth in the Ingroup's Image" (PDF). Political Psychology. 40 (S1): 37–74. doi:10.1111/pops.12569. ISSN 1467-9221.
- Golec de Zavala, Agnieszka; Federico, Christopher; Sedikides, Constantine; Guerra, Rita (July 2019). "Low Self-Esteem Predicts Out-group Derogation via Collective Narcissism, but this Relationship Is Obscured by In-group Satisfaction". Journal of Personality and Social Psychology. 119 (3): 741–764. doi:10.1037/pspp0000260. hdl:10071/19067. PMID 31448939. S2CID 198679668.
- Golec de Zavala, Agnieszka; Peker, Müjde; Guerra, Rita; Baran, Tomasz (2016-11-01). "Collective Narcissism Predicts Hypersensitivity to In-group Insult and Direct and Indirect Retaliatory Intergroup Hostility" (PDF). European Journal of Personality. 30 (6): 532–551. doi:10.1002/per.2067. hdl:10071/12977. ISSN 1099-0984. S2CID 54186348.
- Gramzow, Richard; Gaertner, Lowell (June 2005). "Self-Esteem and Favoritism Toward Novel In-Groups: The Self as an Evaluative Base". Journal of Personality and Social Psychology. 88 (5): 801–15. doi:10.1037/0022-3514.88.5.801. PMID 15898876.
- Kosterman, Rick; Feshbach, Seymour (1989). "Toward a Measure of Patriotic and Nationalistic Attitudes". Political Psychology. 10 (2): 257–274. doi:10.2307/3791647. JSTOR 3791647.
- Lyons, Patricia A.; Coursey, Lauren E.; Kenworthy, Jared B. (2013-05-15). "National Identity and Group Narcissism as Predictors of Intergroup Attitudes Toward Undocumented Latino Immigrants in the United States". Hispanic Journal of Behavioral Sciences. 35 (3): 323–335. doi:10.1177/0739986313488090. ISSN 0739-9863. S2CID 145799478.
- Lyons, Patricia A.; Kenworthy, Jared B.; Popan, Jason R. (2010-08-10). "Ingroup Identification and Group-Level Narcissism as Predictors of U.S. Citizens' Attitudes and Behavior Toward Arab Immigrants". Personality and Social Psychology Bulletin. 36 (9): 1267–1280. doi:10.1177/0146167210380604. ISSN 0146-1672. PMID 20699406. S2CID 23909820.
- Nesdale, Drew; Oar, Ella; Duffy, Amanda; Griffiths, Judith A. (May 2009). "Group membership, group norms, empathy, and young children's intentions to aggress". Aggressive Behavior. Psychology and Behavioral Sciences Collection. 35 (3): 244–258. doi:10.1002/ab.20303. PMID 19309004.
- Post, Jerrold (1986). "Narcissism and the Charismatic Leader-Follower Relationship". Political Psychology. 7 (4). International Society of Political Psychology: 675–688. doi:10.2307/3791208. JSTOR 3791208.
- Roccas, Sonia; Klar, Yechiel; Liviatan, Ido (November 2006). "The Paradox of Group-Based Guilt: Modes of National Identification, Conflict Vehemence, and Reactions to the In-Group's Moral Violations". Journal of Personality and Social Psychology. 91 (4): 698–711. doi:10.1037/0022-3514.91.4.698. PMID 17014294.
- Warren, Muriel P.; Capponi, Attilio (1996). "The role of culture in the development of narcissistic personality disorders in America, Japan and Denmark". Journal of Applied Social Science. 20 (1): 77–82.
