= Narcissistic defences =

Mental processes which preserve the self

Narcissistic defenses are those processes whereby the idealized aspects of the self are preserved, and its limitations denied. They tend to be rigid and totalistic. They are often driven by feelings of shame and guilt, conscious or unconscious.

== Origins ==
Narcissistic defenses are among the earliest defense mechanisms to emerge, and include denial, distortion, and projection. Splitting is another defense mechanism prevalent among individuals with narcissistic personality disorder, borderline personality disorder, and antisocial personality disorder—seeing people and situations in black and white terms, either as all bad or all good.

A narcissistic defense, with the disorder's typical over-valuation of the self, can appear at any stage of development.

== Defence sequences ==
The narcissist typically runs through a sequence of defenses to discharge painful feelings until they find one that works:

1. unconscious repression
2. conscious denial
3. distortion (including exaggeration and minimization), rationalisation and lies
4. psychological projection (blaming somebody else)
5. enlisting the help of one or more of his or her codependent friends who will support his or her distorted view.

== Freudians ==
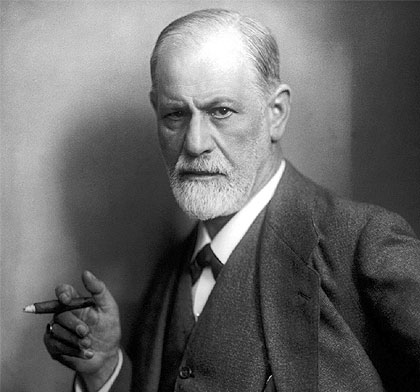
Sigmund Freud

Sigmund Freud did not focus specifically on narcissistic defenses, but did note in On Narcissism how "even great criminals and humorists, as they are represented in literature, compel our interest by the narcissistic consistency with which they manage to keep away from their ego anything that would diminish it". Freud saw narcissistic regression as a defensive answer to object loss—denying the loss of an important object by way of a substitutive identification with it.

Freud also considered social narcissism as a defence mechanism, apparent when communal identifications produce irrational panics at perceived threats to 'Throne and Altar' or 'Free Markets', or in English over-reaction to any questioning of the status and identity of William Shakespeare.

=== Fenichel ===
Otto Fenichel considered that "identification, performed by means of introjection, is the most primitive form of relationship to objects" a primitive mechanism only used "if the ego's function of reality testing is severely damaged by a narcissistic regression."

Fenichel also highlighted "eccentrics who have more or less succeeded in regaining the security of primary narcissism and who feel 'Nothing can happen to me'....[failing] to give up the archaic stages of repudiating displeasure and to turn toward reality".

=== Lacan ===
Jacques Lacan, following out Freud's view of the ego as the result of identifications, came to consider the ego itself as a narcissistic defence, driven by what he called "the 'narcissistic passion' ...in the coming-into-being (devenir) of the subject".

== Kleinians ==
Melanie Klein, emphasised projective identification in narcissism, and the manic defence against becoming aware of the damage done to objects in this way. For Kleinians, at the core of manic defences in narcissism stood what Hanna Segal called "a triad of feelings—control, triumph and contempt".

=== Rosenfeld ===
Herbert Rosenfeld looked at the role of omnipotence, combined with projective identification, as a narcissistic means of defending against awareness of separation between ego and object.

== Object relations theory ==
In the wake of Klein, object relations theory, including particularly the American schools of Otto Kernberg and Heinz Kohut has explored narcissistic defences through analysis of such mechanisms as denial, projective identification, and extreme idealization.

Kernberg emphasised the role of the splitting apart introjections, and identifications of opposing qualities, as a cause of ego weakness. Kohut too stressed the fact in narcissism "vertical splits are between self-structures (among others)—'I am grand' and 'I am wretched'—with very little communication between them".

Neville Symington however placed greater weight on the way "a person dominated by narcissistic currents...survives through being able to sense the emotional tone of the other...wearing the cloaks of others"; while for Spotnitz the key element is that the narcissist turns feelings in upon the self in narcissistic defense.

=== Positive defenses ===
Kernberg emphasised the positive side to narcissistic defenses, while Kohut also stressed the necessity in early life for narcissistic positions to succeed each other in orderly maturational sequences.

Others like Symington would maintain that "it is a mistake to split narcissism into positive and negative...we do not get positive narcissism without self-hatred".

== Stigmatising attitude to psychiatric illness ==
Arikan found that a stigmatising attitude to psychiatric patients is associated with narcissistic defences.

== 21st century ==
The twenty-first century has seen a distinction drawn between cerebral and somatic narcissists—the former building up their self-sense through intellectualism, the latter through an obsession with their bodies, as with the woman who, in bad faith, invests her sense of freedom only in being an object of beauty for others.

== Literary parallels ==
- Sir Philip Sidney is said to have seen poetry in itself as a narcissistic defense.
- Jean-Paul Sartre's aloof, detached protagonists have been seen as crude narcissists who preserve their sense of self only by petrifying it into solid form.

== See also ==
- Antinarcissism
- Egocentrism
- Narcissism of small differences
- Narcissistic rage and narcissistic injury
- Narcissistic supply
- Narcissistic withdrawal
- True self and false self
