= Bychowski =

Bychowski is a surname. Notable people with the surname include:

- Gustav Bychowski (1895–1972), Polish psychoanalyst
- Szneur Zalman Bychowski (1865–1934), Polish-Jewish neurologist and social activist
