= Psychoanalytic Center of Philadelphia =

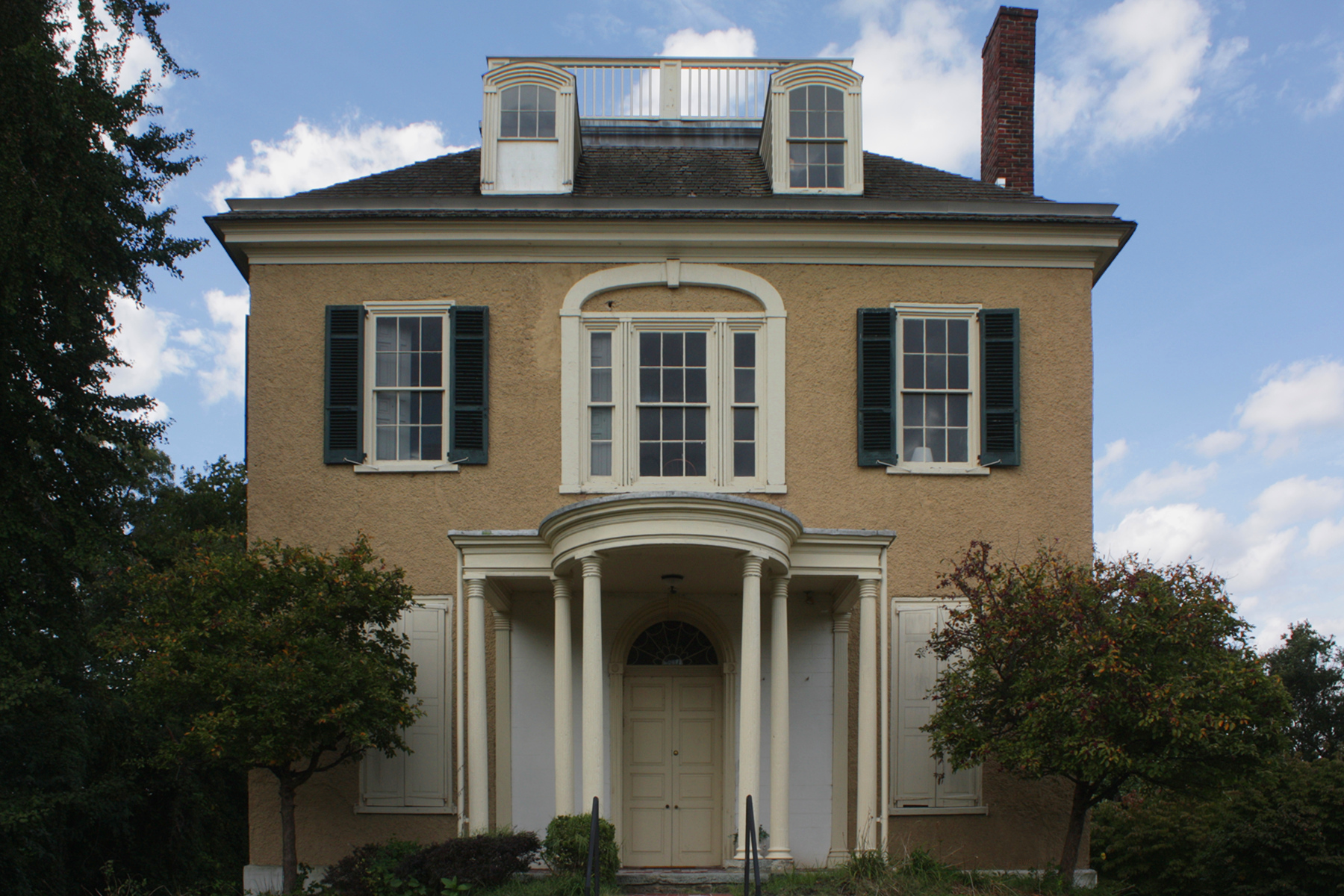
- Formation: 1937; 89 years ago
- Founders: O. Spurgeon English; Sidney Biddle; LeRoy Maeder; Gerald Pearson
- Founded at: Philadelphia, Pennsylvania
- Website: pcph.memberclicks.net

The Psychoanalytic Center of Philadelphia (PCOP) was founded on October 27, 1937 as the Philadelphia Psychoanalytic Society, to promote the study and teaching of psychoanalysis. On May 7, 1939, the Society was accepted as a Constituent Society by the American Psychoanalytic Association.

Founding members included O. Spurgeon English, M.D. , Sidney Geoffrey Biddle, M.D., LeRoy M.A. Maeder, M.D., George W. Smeltz, M.D., and Robert Waelder, M.D.. PCOP's Child Psychoanalytic Training Program was founded and directed by Margaret Mahler, and continues in this tradition; PCOP likewise sponsors and hosts the yearly Mahler Symposium on Child Development.

In 1949, Philadelphia Psychoanalytic Society split into two factions,the Philadelphia Association for Psychoanalysis and the Philadelphia Psychoanalytic Institute and Society. This split ended in 1999 after a 50 year rift.

PCOP is currently housed in the historic Rockland Mansion in East Fairmount Park.

PCOP offers training in foundational psychoanalytic thought, branching into training paths in psychodynamic psychotherapy, psychoanalysis, and child psychoanalysis.

== Associated figures ==
- Salman Akhtar
- Aaron Beck
- O. Spurgeon English
- Selma Kramer
- Margaret Mahler
- Henri Parens
- Gerald H.J. Pearson
- Jonathan M. Raines
- Robert Waelder
