= Jonathan M. Raines =

American psychoanalyst

- Education: University of Pennsylvania
- Occupation: Medical psychoanalyst

Jonathan M. Raines graduated from the University of Pennsylvania with a B.A. in Psychology. He attended Temple University School of Medicine, where he was awarded the O. Spurgeon English Award as well as his M.D. in 1982. Subsequently, he served his internship at Pennsylvania Hospital and his residency at the Institute of the Pennsylvania Hospital, where he received the Glencairn Prize.

He received his psychoanalytic training at the Philadelphia Association for Psychoanalysis and was subsequently certified by the Board of Professional Standards of the American Psychoanalytic Association. Dr. Raines had faculty appointments at the University of Pennsylvania School of Medicine, the Philadelphia Association for Psychoanalysis and the Delaware Psychiatric Center. He was President and Chairman of the Board of Directors of the Greenspan Foundation from 1989-1997. He is currently a member of the medical staff of Pennsylvania Hospital and Lankenau Hospital. Additionally, he holds faculty appointments at the Psychoanalytic Center of Philadelphia, the Center for Psychoanalysis at Albert Einstein Medical Center, the Lankenau Institute for Medical Research, and the Psychoanalytic Association Of New York, where he is on the board of the Psychoanalytic Study Group of Philadelphia.

He is a member of many professional associations, including the American Medical Association, American Psychiatric Association, International Psychoanalytical Association, Pennsylvania Psychiatric Society and the Association of American Physicians and Surgeons. Dr. Raines has been the recipient of many awards and honors including Fellow, College of Physicians of Philadelphia; Fellow, American Psychiatric Association; Distinguished Fellow, American Psychiatric Association; Fellow, International Psychoanalytical Association; Fellow, American Board of Psychoanalysis.

He has been recognized by U.S. News & World Report as one of America's top doctors with special expertise in psychoanalysis, psychotherapy, anxiety disorders and psychosomatic disorders, as well as one of Philadelphia's top doctors by Philadelphia Magazine since 2013.

A dedicated researcher and writer, Dr. Raines has authored and co-authored publications on Borderline Personality Disorder, psychopharmacology, Sigmund Freud and a study of Hitler's psychopathology. He also has interests in the basic mechanisms of disease and potential new treatments.

== Published works ==
- Raines, J. M. (1985). "Hitler's Psychopathology". JAMA: The Journal of the American Medical Association. 254 (5): 681. doi:10.1001/jama.1985.03360050119039.
- Raines, J. M. (1986). "Freud and the Imaginative World". JAMA: The Journal of the American Medical Association. 255 (4): 547–793. doi:10.1001/jama.1986.03370040123039.
- Raines, J. M.; Greenspan, D. (1987). "Clonazepam in the treatment of chronic schizophrenia". The American Journal of Psychiatry. 144 (11): 1510. doi:10.1176/ajp.144.11.1510a. PMID 3674236.
- Raines, J. M.; Raines, L. C.; Singer, M. (1994). "Dracula. Disorders of the self and borderline personality organization". The Psychiatric Clinics of North America. 17 (4): 811–826. doi:10.1016/S0193-953X(18)30087-X. PMID 7877904.
- Valenzano, M. C.; Mercado, J. M.; Wang, X; Zurbach, E. P.; Raines, J; McDonnell, E; Morgan, M; Farrell, C; Rudolph, D; Hwang, A; Barr, M; Cherian, D; Bailey, R; Raile, B; Albert, N; Thornton, J; Zitin, M; Abramson, J; Newman, G; Daum, G; Mercogliano, G; Mullin, J. M. (2014). "Drug delivery of zinc to Barrett's metaplasia by oral administration to Barrett's esophagus patients". Therapeutic Delivery. 5 (3): 257–64. doi:10.4155/tde.13.151. PMID 24592952.
- Mullin, J. M.; Raines, J; Livornese Jr, L. L. (2015). "Retrofitting the battlements: Tight junction remodeling as a novel antimicrobial approach". Future Medicinal Chemistry. 7 (1): 9–13. doi:10.4155/fmc.14.146. PMID 25582329.
- Valenzano, M. C.; Rybakovsky, E.; Chen, V.; Leroy, K.; Lander, J.; Richardson, E.; Yalamanchili, S.; McShane, S.; Mathew, A.; Mayilvaganan, B.; Connor, L.; Urbas, R.; Huntington, W.; Corcoran, A.; Trembeth, S.; McDonnell, E.; Wong, P.; Newman, G.; Mercogliano, G.; Zitin, M.; Etemad, B.; Thornton, J.; Daum, G.; Raines, J.; Kossenkov, A.; Fong, L. Y.; Mullin, J. M. (2020-05-15). "Zinc Gluconate Induces Potentially Cancer Chemopreventive Activity in Barrett's Esophagus: A Phase 1 Pilot Study". Digestive Diseases and Sciences. 66 (4). Springer Science and Business Media LLC: 1195–1211. doi:10.1007/s10620-020-06319-x. ISSN 0163-2116. PMC 7677901. PMID 32415564.
