= Szneur Zalman Bychowski =

Polish-Jewish neurologist and social activist (1865–1934)

Zygmunt Bychowski
- Szneur Zalman Bychowski
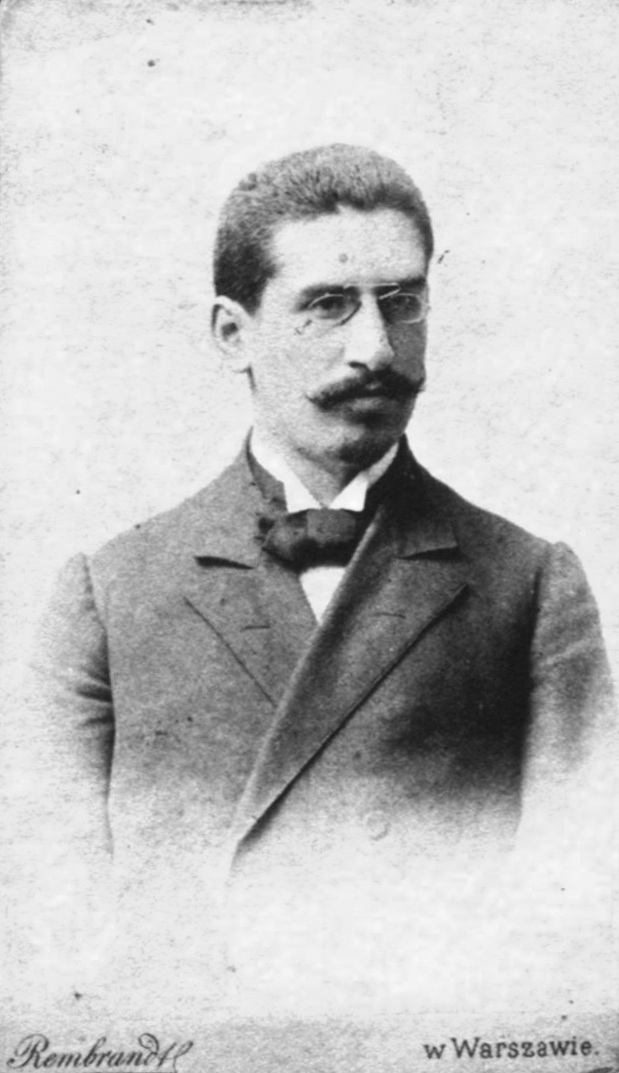
- Zygmunt Bychowski
- Born: 18 August 1865; Korzec, Volhynia
- Died: 13 September 1934 (aged 69); Warsaw, Poland
- Education: University of Warsaw
- Occupations: Neurologist, social activist, politician
- Known for: Pioneering neurosurgery in Poland, Grasset-Bychowski sign, Zionist leader
- Spouse: Gizela Horwitz
- Children: Gustaw Bychowski, Jan, Marta Osnos

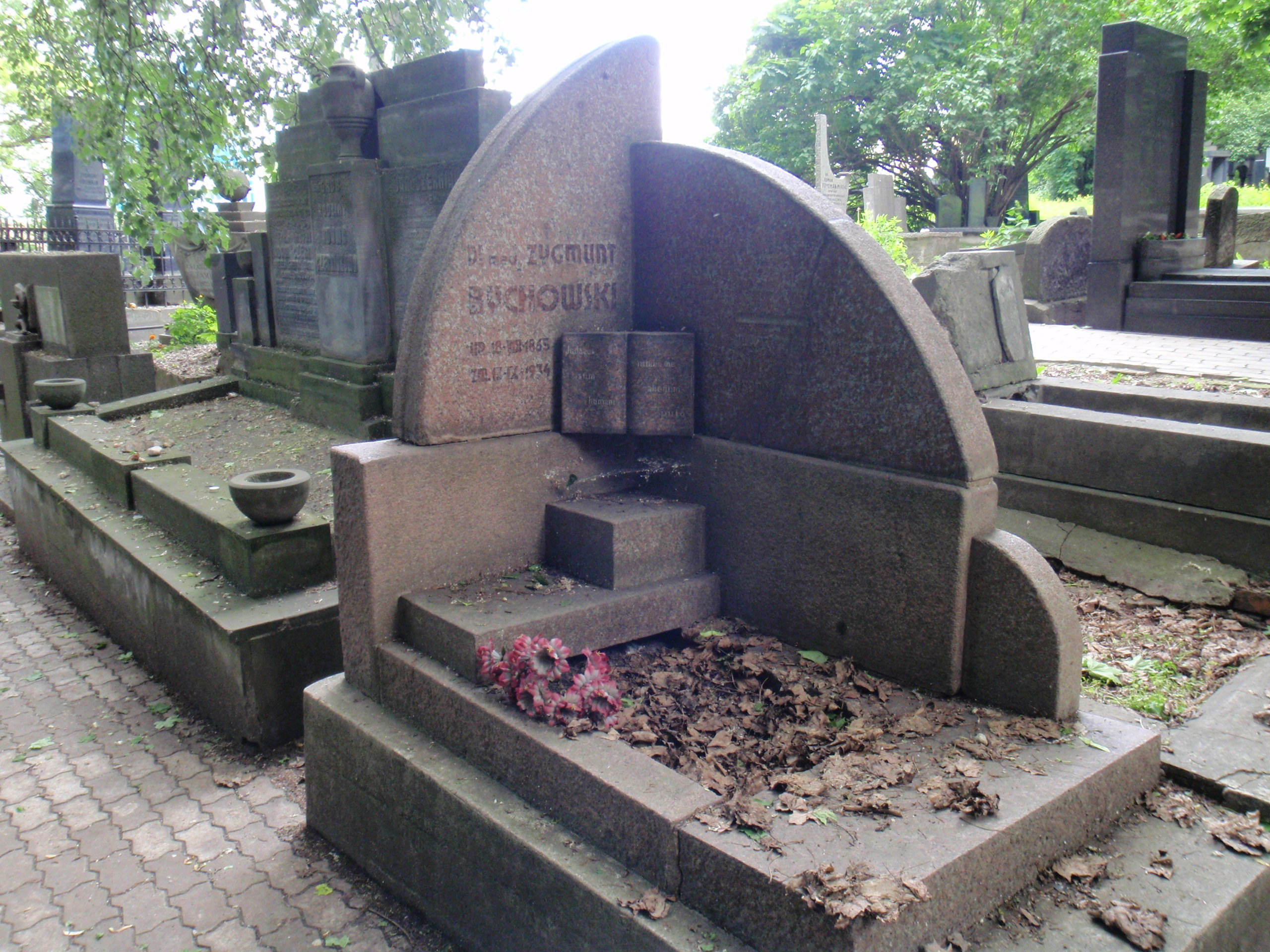
Grave of Zygmunt Bychowski at the Jewish Cemetery in Warsaw

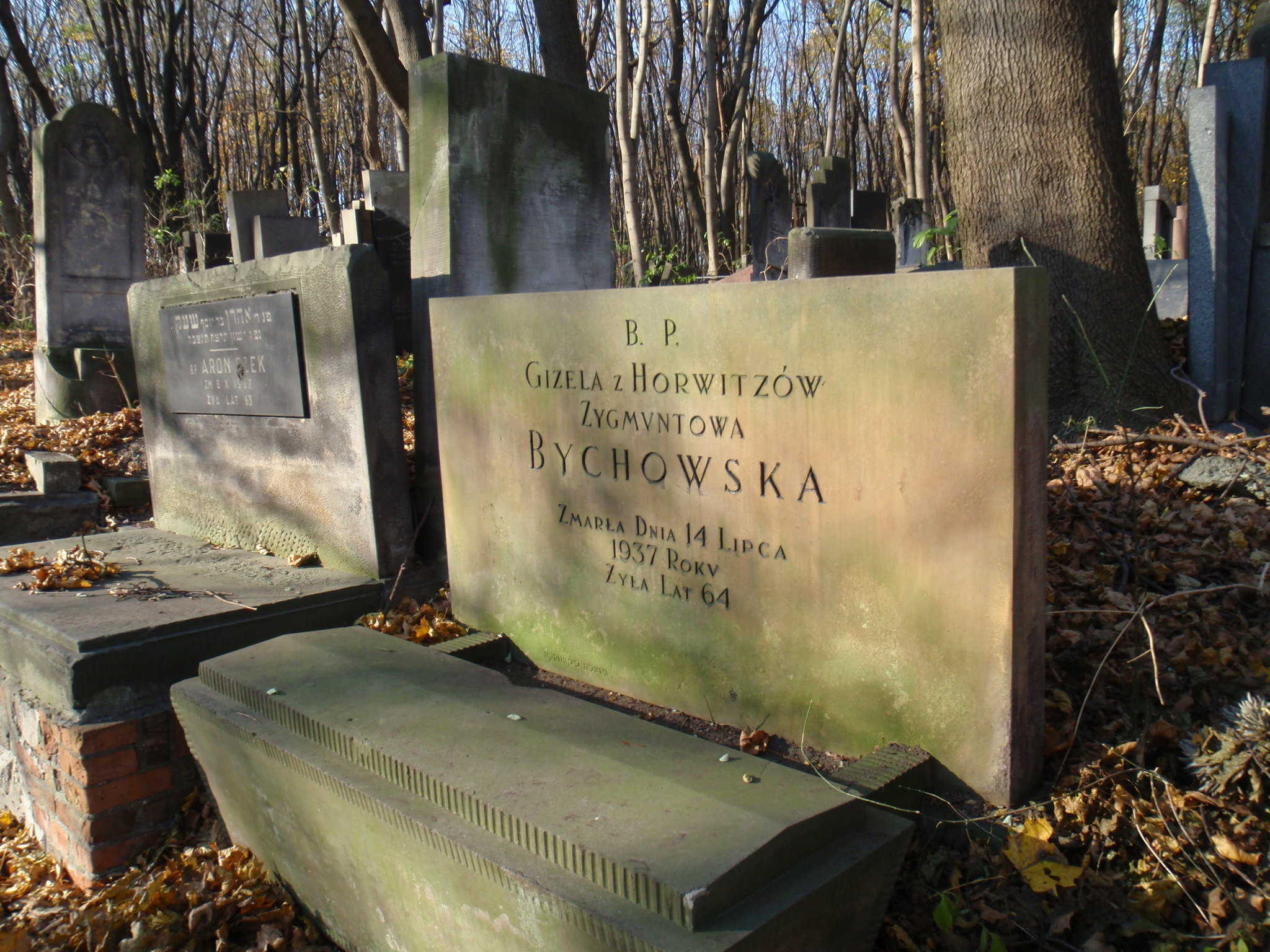
Grave of Gizela Bychowska at the Jewish Cemetery in Warsaw

Zygmunt Bychowski (also known as Szneur Zalman Bychowski; שניאור זלמן ביחובסקי; 18 August 1865 – 13 September 1934) was a Polish Jewish neurologist, social activist, and politician. He served as a magistrate of the City of Warsaw (1923–1934) and was a Jewish and Zionist leader in Poland.

== Biography ==
He was born in Korzec (now Korets, Ukraine) in Volhynia as the son of Samuel (Szmul) and Fejga, a wealthy hasidic family. His father was a prominent Talmudist.

Until the age of 17, Bychowski received a traditional Orthodox religious education, attending a cheder, a Talmud Torah, and a yeshiva in Korzec. After moving to Warsaw, he initially continued his Talmudic studies but soon pursued secular education against the wishes of his parents (his father initially disowned him, though they later reconciled). After passing his matriculation exams, he went to Austria to study natural sciences and philosophy at the University of Vienna. He later returned to Warsaw to study medicine at the Imperial University of Warsaw. He received his medical degree on 23 February 1893. He worked for a time in the polyclinic of Samuel Goldflam on Graniczna Street and also traveled abroad to further his knowledge of neurology.

In 1904, he participated in the Russo-Japanese War as a physician in the Russian Army. Upon his return, as a member of a Zionist association, he was arrested at his home on Grzybowska Street in Warsaw and imprisoned for a long period in the jail at the City Hall.

From 1892, he worked at the Hospital of the Transfiguration in the Praga district of Warsaw in the ward of Jan Raum. In 1912, he was dismissed from his position due to his Jewish background. During World War I, from December 1916 to April 1918, he worked at the Traumatology Institute in Moscow.

He died of esophageal cancer in 1934. He was buried on 16 September at the Jewish Cemetery on Okopowa Street.

== Political and social activity ==
Bychowski became associated with the Lovers of Zion movement during his student years under the influence of Saul Pinchas Rabbinowicz. After completing his studies, he traveled to Palestine for a time with Ignacy Bernstein. He corresponded with Theodor Herzl and participated in the First Zionist Congress in Basel in 1897 and many subsequent congresses; he was a member of the organizing committee for the Fifth Zionist Congress and the committee for cultural affairs. In 1905, he was imprisoned in Russia for his Zionist activities.

In the early 1920s, he was a member of the Party Council of the Zionist Organization in Poland. He was a candidate and deputy for the Legislative Sejm on the list of the Temporary Jewish National Council in Warsaw. He served as a member of the Central Election Committee of Et Livnot for the 13th Zionist Congress in Karlsbad in 1923 and was a member of the central committee of HaHalutz. In 1925, he was a member of the Organizing Committee for the Palestinian Exhibition in Warsaw.

From 1923 to 1934, Bychowski served as a magistrate (assessor) of the Warsaw City Council, where he headed the hospital and public health department as well as the supply department. He sat on the Council of the Jewish Religious Community (1924–1931) and the first board of the Committee for the Promotion of Judaic Sciences (1925), and was a research fellow at the Institute for Judaic Sciences in Warsaw. He was also a member of the Warsaw lodge of B'nai B'rith.

For many years, he chaired the Jewish Anti-Tuberculosis Society "Brijus-Zdrowie." He was a member of the editorial committees for Neurologia Polska (Polish Neurology) and Warszawskie Czasopismo Lekarskie (Warsaw Medical Journal). He collaborated with Jewish journals, including Nasz Przegląd, the weekly Ewa, and the bi-weekly Cjonistisze Welt. He served as vice president of the Warsaw Neurological Society. He was a board and scientific council member of the Association of Physicians of the Republic of Poland and a board member of the Society for the Protection of the Health of the Jewish Population in Poland (TOZ). He was a co-founder and board member of the Society for the Study of the Physical and Mental State of Jews. Furthermore, he served as a curator for the Care Home for Abandoned Jewish Children and was founder and first President of the Jewish Gymnastic and Sports Society "Maccabi" in Warsaw. He was an Honorary Philister of the Academic Zionist Corporation "Betharia" and a founding member of the Polish Psychiatric Association.

== Scientific contributions ==
Bychowski was the author of approximately 100 works in Polish, German, French, and Russian. On his initiative, the first neurosurgical operations in Poland were conducted, including the Anton-Bramann operation. Bychowski was the first in Poland to qualify a patient for surgery on a pituitary tumor.

He authored numerous studies on epilepsy and endocrinology. He is cited as an author of works describing a neurological sign later known as Hoover's sign. Another sign he described, present in hemiparesis, is known as the Grasset-Bychowski sign.

== Works ==
- O chorobie Parkinson’a (On Parkinson's Disease). Medycyna 22 (1894)
- Przyczynek do kazuistyki uchyłków przełyku (diverticulum oesophagi) (Contribution to the Casuistry of Esophageal Diverticula). Medycyna 23 (1895)
- "Beitrag zur Casuistik des Oesophagus-Divertikels". Archiv für pathologische Anatomie und Physiologie und für klinische Medicin. 141 (1): 115–127. 1895. doi:10.1007/BF01966626.
- Przyczynek do patogenezy padaczki (Contribution to the Pathogenesis of Epilepsy). Medycyna, 1895
- Przypadek pląsawicy miękkiej czyli paralitycznej (A Case of Chorea Mollis or Paralytic Chorea). Medycyna, 1895
- Przypadek myxoedematu leczonego tyreoidyną oraz kilka uwag o myxoedemacie w ogóle (A Case of Myxedema Treated with Thyroidin). Przegląd Chirurgiczny, 1896
- "Beiträge zur Nosographie der Parkinson'schen Krankheit (Paralysis agitans)". Archiv für Psychiatrie und Nervenkrankheiten. 30 (3): 722–765. 1898. doi:10.1007/BF02035011.
- Leczenie w naszych szpitalach (Treatment in Our Hospitals). Zdrowie, 1901
- "Ein Fall von recidivirender doppelseitiger Ptose mit myasthenischen Erscheinungen in den oberen Extremitäten". Deutsche Zeitschrift für Nervenheilkunde. 22 (3–4): 333–345. 1902. doi:10.1007/BF01668805.
- Ein "Archiv für Zionismus" : (Vorschlag für die Mitglieder der Cultur-Commission). Die Welt 21, 1902
- Czy bywa nierówność źrenic u ludzi zupełnie zdrowych? (Is There Pupil Inequality in Completely Healthy People?). Gazeta Lekarska, 1902
- Ueber Hypotonie und Hypertonie bei einer und derselben Kranken. Neurologiches Centralblatt 23, pp. 786–792, 1904
- O rozpoznaniu i operacyjnem leczeniu nowotworów przysadki mózgowej (On the Diagnosis and Surgical Treatment of Brain Pituitary Tumors). Medycyna 44, p. 628, 1909
- "Über einige Indikationen zur radikalen nnd palliativen Trepanation bei Gehirngeschwülsten". Deutsche Zeitschrift für Nervenheilkunde. 39 (1–2): 141–164. 1910. doi:10.1007/BF01649713.
- "Zur Klinik der oberflächlich gelegenen Gehirntumoren und über das Verhalten des Babinskischen Zehenphänomens bei kortikalen Hemiplegien". Deutsche Zeitschrift für Nervenheilkunde. 49 (3): 227–243. 1913. doi:10.1007/BF01762779.
- Dzieci kaleki i opieka nad niemi (Crippled Children and Their Care). Warsaw, 1914
- "Über die Restitution der nach einem Schädelschuß verlorengegangenen Sprachen bei einem Polyglotten". Monatsschrift für Psychiatrie und Neurologie. 45 (4): 183–201. 1919. doi:10.1159/000190739.
- 25-lecie objawu Babińskiego (25 Years of the Babinski Sign). Neurologia Polska 6, p. 169, 1922
- Higiena u Żydów (Hygiene among Jews). Miesięcznik Żydowski 2, pp. 191-192, 1931
- Dr Samuel Goldflam, lekarz i uczony (Dr. Samuel Goldflam, Physician and Scholar), 1933
- Ubój rytualny z punktu widzenia humanitarnego i sanitarnego (Ritual Slaughter from a Humanitarian and Sanitary Point of View). Warsaw: Monolit, 1936
