= Narcissistic injury =

Shame that devastates an individual's self worth

In psychoanalysis, narcissistic injury, also known as narcissistic wound or wounded ego, is emotional trauma that overwhelms an individual's defense mechanisms and affects their pride or sense of dignity. This is sometimes referred to as a "narcissistic scar".

Sigmund Freud maintained that "losses in love" and "losses associated with failure" often leave behind injury to an individual's self-regard.

== Signals of narcissistic injury ==
A narcissistic injury will oftentimes not be noticeable by the subject at first sight. Narcissistic injuries, or narcissistic wounds, are likely a result of criticism, loss, or even a sense of abandonment. Those diagnosed with narcissistic personality disorder will come off as excessively defensive and attacking when facing any sort of criticism. While the average person would likely react by expressing vulnerability, a person dealing with a narcissistic wound will do the opposite, causing them to come off as narcissistic, despite feeling hurt inside. The reaction of a narcissistic injury is a cover-up for the real feelings of one who faces these problems.

To others, a narcissistic injury may seem as if the person is gaslighting or turning the issue back onto the other person. A person may come off as manipulative and aggressive because they refuse to accept anything they are told that they do not want to hear. It is important for those dealing with narcissistic wounds to make it clear to those whom they attack with their words that this is indeed a disorder, even when it takes the form of an insult towards another person.

Children who are taught that failure leads to less love and affection are more likely to become obsessed with perfection and are more likely to develop narcissistic personality disorder. The importance of self-love and unconditional love when raising children can help show them that their feelings are valid, no matter the situation, and regardless of how well or poorly they perform.

Sigmund Freud's concept of what in his last book he called "early injuries to the self (injuries to narcissism)" was subsequently extended by a wide variety of psychoanalysts. Karl Abraham saw the key to adult depression in the childhood experience of a blow to narcissism through the loss of narcissistic supply. Otto Fenichel confirmed the importance of narcissistic injury in depressives and expanded such analyses to include borderline personalities.

Edmund Bergler emphasized the importance of infantile omnipotence in narcissism, and the rage that follows any blow to that sense of narcissistic omnipotence; Annie Reich stressed how a feeling of shame fueled rage, when a blow to narcissism exposed the gap between one's ego ideal and reality; while Jacques Lacan linked Freud on the narcissistic wound to Lacan on the narcissistic mirror stage.

Finally, object relations theory highlights rage against early environmental failures that left patients feeling bad about themselves when childhood omnipotence was too abruptly challenged.

1. Becoming defensive. When a narcissist's feelings are hurt, they are likely to react with hostility and tend to hold grudges. This is due to having a poor understanding of the emotional responses towards others. They lack empathy when hurting others' feelings due to their thought processing. They do not like confrontation. It is their high ego that needs to be fulfilled but deep down the cause of it is due to insecurities within themselves. When a narcissist's wants are challenged, they can act out through anger. This can stem from experiences of abuse, so they project their internalized trauma onto others.
2. Narcissists lack self confidence, which projects on to relationships. Jealousy roots in neurotic insecurity. Examples of possessiveness include jealousy of a person's attention being taken away by another, and thoughts of worry that someone will take one's partner away. Their high sense of possessiveness root from a high degree of jealousy. Their possessiveness may lead them to be abusive towards their partners and friends, as well.
3. Withdrawal can trigger an emotional reaction when a narcissist experiences a major setback. This collapse competes against the external validation they think they are entitled to and in return causes them emotional pain that they express as rage. A setback causes them to feel intensely frustrated.
4. Extreme mood swings. Outbursts of rage or silence are commonly seen in people with narcissistic personality disorder. Some experiences that can affect this are threats to their self-esteem or when they are not given the attention or wants they think they deserve. Mood swings may be triggered when a narcissist's perception is confronted with contrary beliefs and so may respond with anger.
5. Feelings of power imbalance. Narcissists tend to suffer from strong feelings of inferiority and so have a hard time convincing themselves that they have achieved enough. A narcissist only demands what they want without concern for the other. In a relationship, the partner of the narcissist may experience gaslighting, ghosting, and manipulation.

== Treatment ==
Adam Phillips has argued that, contrary to what common sense might expect, therapeutic cure involves the patient being encouraged to re-experience "a terrible narcissistic wound"— the child's experience of exclusion by the parental alliance— in order to come to terms with, and learn again, the diminishing loss of omnipotence entailed by the basic "facts of life".

== Misuse of phrase ==
Neville Symington points out that "You will often hear people say, 'Oh, I'm very narcissistic,' or, 'It was a wound to my narcissism.' Such comments are not a true recognition of the condition; they are throw-away lines. To really recognize narcissism in oneself is profoundly distressing and often associated with denial."

== See also ==
- Defense mechanism
- Humiliation
- Narcissistic mortification
- Narcissistic withdrawal
