= Hypersensitive Narcissism Scale =

Psychological scale

The Hypersensitive Narcissism Scale (HSNS) is a self-report measure of covert narcissism. It was developed by Holly M. Hendin and Jonathan M. Cheek in 1997. It consists of ten items rated on a five-point scale.

It has a near zero correlation with the Narcissistic Personality Inventory, which measures overt narcissism.

The unidimensionality of the HSNS has been questioned.
