= Robert Waelder =

Austrian psychoanalyst (1900–1967)

Robert Waelder (1900–1967) was a noted Austrian psychoanalyst and member of the Vienna Psychoanalytic Society. Waelder studied under Anna Freud and Hermann Nunberg. He was known for his work bringing together psychoanalysis and politics and wrote extensively on the subject.

== Life ==
Waelder was the son of the Jewish merchant Joseph Waelder. Waelder graduated from Maximilian Gymnasium with honors in 1918; and he received a doctorate in physics in 1921. He contacted Sigmund Freud in 1922 to inquire about treatment, and was referred to Hans Jokl. He later trained under Anna Freud and Hermann Nunberg, and in 1924 became a member of the Vienna Psychoanalytic Society.

His first marriage was to a fellow member of the Vienna Psychoanalytic Society, Jenny Pollak. In 1938, he emigrated to the United States and taught at the Boston Psychoanalytic Institute. He moved to Philadelphia where he was a founding member of the Psychoanalytic Center of Philadelphia. In 1963, he was appointed professor of psychoanalysis at the psychiatry department of Jefferson Medical College in Philadelphia.

Waelder died of heart failure on September 28, 1967, in Broomall, Pennsylvania.

== Writings and work ==
- Waelder’s first articles, on psychotic mechanisms, were published in the International Journal of Psychoanalysis in 1925 and 1926. They were followed by an article on Play in the Psychoanalytic Quarterly, in 1933. Meanwhile, in 1930 Waelder had published in German Principle of Multiple Function (Internationale Zeitschift fur Psychoanalyse, 1930, 16: 286–300; it was translated in English in 1936: The principle of multiple function: observations on over-determination. Psychoanalytic Quarterly, 1936, 5: 45–62; reprint: 2007, 76: 75–92). In it Waelder widened Freud's formulation of psychological symptoms, hypothesising that they were caused by and relieved conflict simultaneously. Symptoms, such as phobias and compulsions, each represent elements of some internal drive like superego, anxiety, reality, and defenses.
- As a representative of the Viennese analysts, and within the context of an exchange of views, in 1936 Waelder presented in London his critique of the teachings of Melanie Klein; "The Problem of the Genesis of Psychical Conflict" was published in 1936. Waelder also presented to the Royal Institute of International Affairs his work on psychology and politics, which was published as "The Psychological Aspects of International Affairs", and which suggested how psychoanalytic notions might be applied to the study of war; In a similar vein, he had written a short study on collective psychoses.
- Waelder was one of the first to create a structured analysis of love, according to Martin S. Bergmann. Similar to the sketches Freud made, Waelder states that an ideal partner must recreate early childhood imprints, and create a connection with the subconscious ego that is both alive – containing friction – but must also create a mental balance. Quote: "To Waelder, love was an act of integration of a high order, a tribute to the ego's capacity to bring together harmoniously wishes of the Id, demands of the repetition compulsion, the demands of the superego, and the claims of reality. The love object chosen must be sexually gratifying, connected unconsciously to love objects in one's past (mother, father figures, etc. ed), sufficiently admired to meet the approval of the superego, and appropriate in meeting the demands of reality." – Martin S. Bergmann, The Anatomy of Loving: The Story of Man's Quest to Know What Love Is.
- His Basic Theory of Psychoanalysis (of 1960) presented an orthodox view of American ego psychology in theory and practice, arguing that “the very nature of the psychoanalytic process makes it the key that fits the neuroses but does not fit other disorders”. He suggested accordingly that ‘liberal’ variations in analytic practice were likely to be sterile, and praised the way that “the ‘orthodox’ analyst stands more in awe of the unconscious”.

== Partial bibliography ==
- Psychological aspects of war and peace. Geneva Studies, 10,2. (1929)
- The Living Thoughts of Freud. New York and Toronto: Longmans, Green & Co. (1941)
- Basic theory of psychoanalysis. New York: International Universities Press. (1960)
- Progress and revolution: A study of the issues of our age. New York: International Universities Press. (1967)
- Psychoanalysis: Observations, theory, application: Selected papers of Robert Waelder. New York: International Universities Press. (1976)

== See also ==
- Ego psychology
- Franz Alexander
- Object relations theory
