= Narcissistic personality disorder =

Personality disorder

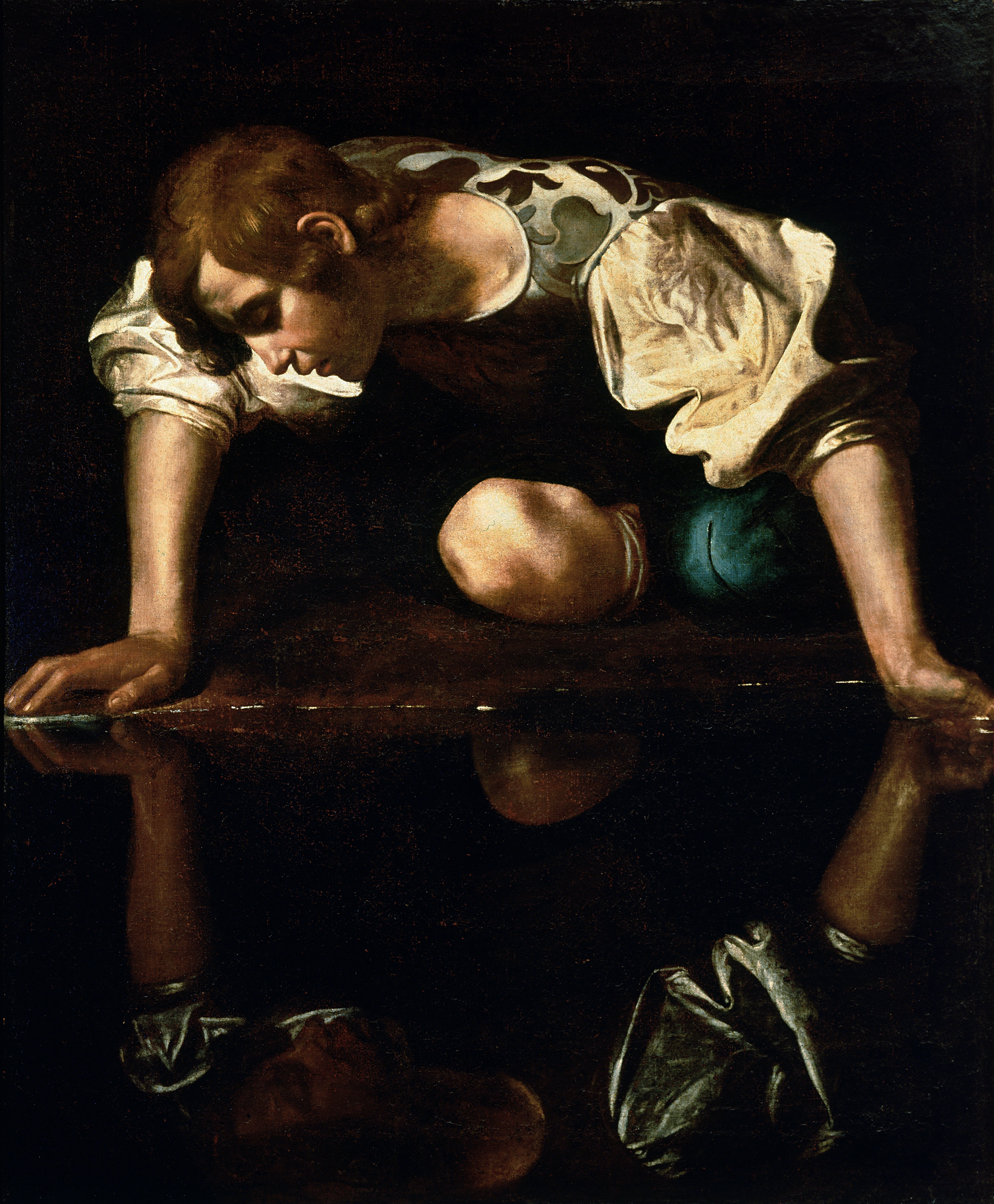
- Narcissus (1597–1599) by Caravaggio; the man in love with his own reflection
- Specialty: Psychiatry, clinical psychology
- Symptoms: Exaggerated feelings of self-importance, excessive craving for admiration, reduced levels of empathy
- Usual onset: Early adulthood
- Duration: Long term
- Causes: A combination of genetic and environmental factors
- Diagnostic method: Based on symptoms
- Differential diagnosis: Other personality disorders (e.g., antisocial, borderline, histrionic, obsessive–compulsive, paranoid, or schizotypal); mania or hypomania; symptoms stemming from substance use disorders; anxiety disorders, mood disorders
- Treatment: Predominantly psychotherapy
- Prevalence: Estimates range within 0–6.2%

Narcissistic personality disorder (NPD) is a complex and heterogeneous personality disorder characterized by patterns of grandiosity, entitlement, low empathy, and interpersonal difficulties, which can manifest as either grandiose ("thick-skinned") or vulnerable ("thin-skinned") forms. Grandiose individuals display arrogance, social dominance, and exploitative behaviors, while vulnerable individuals show shame, inferiority, hypersensitivity, and extreme reactions to criticism. NPD often involves impaired emotional empathy, superficial relationships, and difficulty tolerating disagreement. It is often co-morbid with other mental disorders and associated with significant functional impairment and psychosocial disability.

There are two definitions of NPD in the American Psychiatric Association's Diagnostic and Statistical Manual of Mental Disorders (DSM); whereas the primary definition is categorical and stems from previous DSM editions, the other definition – part of the Alternative DSM-5 model for personality disorders – is based on dimensional measures of severity of the disorder as well as on specific pathological traits. The International Classification of Diseases (ICD) defines only a general personality disorder since the introduction of the latest edition; hence, it does not include an NPD category.

There is no standard treatment for NPD. Its high comorbidity with other mental disorders influences treatment and outcomes. Psychotherapeutic treatments generally fall into two categories: psychoanalytic/psychodynamic and cognitive behavioral therapy, with growing support for integration of different modalities in therapy. However, there are few studies on the effectiveness of treatments. Treatment is frequently not sought; one's subjective experience of the mental disorder, as well as one's agreement to and level of engagement with treatment, are highly dependent on one's motivation to change.

NPD's etiology is thought to be largely genetic and neurobiological, with structural and functional brain differences in areas related to self-processing and empathy. Assessment tools such as the Narcissistic Personality Inventory or Pathological Narcissism Inventory can help differentiate subtypes. NPD has historical roots in psychoanalytic theory and remains a subject of controversy in psychiatric classification, while its manifestations continue to appear in literature and media as exemplars of extreme self-focus and entitlement.

== Signs and symptoms ==
Individuals with narcissistic personality disorder may be grandiose or self-loathing, extraverted or socially isolated, captains of industry or unable to maintain steady employment, model citizens or prone to antisocial activities.

— Caligor, Levy & Yeomans 2015, p. 416

NPD is complex and far from uniform in its presentation and consequences. Empirical evidence suggests several subtypes of NPD may exist (see the Subtypes section below), but in general, the disorder is known to have grandiose ("thick-skinned") and vulnerable ("thin-skinned") expressions.

Grandiose, thick-skinned NPD patients show a sense of uniqueness or superiority, attitudes of entitlement, a belief that others envy their abilities or status, low empathy, social dominance, superficial charm, disdainfulness or snobbery, and an exploitative interpersonal style characterized by manipulation and selfishness.

Vulnerable, thin-skinned individuals with NPD also show entitlement, selfishness and low empathy, but uniquely, they demonstrate feelings of shame and inferiority, are envious of others' abilities or status, tend to be shy, paranoid, vindictive, and emotionally dependent on admiration, and show extreme rage and hostility in response to rejection and criticism. This behavior stems from low self-esteem, a need for admiration and validation, and social belonging.

While vulnerable-type patients typically show extreme distress and dysfunction, grandiose variants tend to be associated with greater psychological wellbeing, often manifesting dysfunction by occupational conflict, harming others, antisocial behavior or emotional strain resulting from perfectionism.

It is often theorized that some patients may oscillate between grandiosity and vulnerability. While some evidence suggests that grandiose individuals show occasional reactive anger (a vulnerable trait), but narcissistically vulnerable individuals do not show signs of grandiosity, most studies show the vulnerable individuals show occasional bouts of grandiosity, narcissistically grandiose individuals show few or no signs of vulnerability.

=== Other features ===
NPD patients may have difficulty accepting help. They may also exhibit vengeful fantasies, as well as violent and antisocial behaviour. They are more likely to try forms of plastic surgery due to a desire to gain attention and to be seen as beautiful.

Patients with NPD have an impaired ability to recognize facial expressions or mimic emotions, as well as a lower capacity for emotional empathy and emotional intelligence. People with NPD are less likely to engage in prosocial behavior. They can still act in selfless ways to improve others' perceptions of them, advance their social status, or if explicitly told to. Despite these characteristics, they are more likely to overestimate their capacity for empathy.

It is common for people with NPD to have difficult relationships. They may disrespect others' boundaries or idealize and devalue them. They commonly keep people emotionally distant, and project, deny, or split. NPD individuals manifesting vulnerability tend to become enraged when rejected or criticised, and may degrade, insult, or blame others who disagree with them.

NPD may be associated with reduced insight into symptoms, especially in severe cases. Given the high-function sociability associated with narcissism, some people with NPD might not view such a diagnosis as a functional impairment to their lives.

Although overconfidence tends to make people with NPD very ambitious, such a mindset does not necessarily lead to professional high achievement and success, because they may refuse to take risks, in order to avoid failure or the appearance of failure. Moreover, the psychological inability to tolerate disagreement, contradiction, and criticism makes it difficult for persons with NPD to work cooperatively or to maintain long-term relationships.

Individuals with NPD often do not practice or believe in harm avoidance. Instead, they view punishment and accountability as inferior and unnecessary, and view consequences with a low regard, regardless of their negative behaviors and actions. They have few social inhibitions due to their grandiose personality complex.

Regarding novelty seeking, individuals contain an inherent pleasure to perform unusual gestures as an incentive to gain reward and extreme recognition for their gestures.

Persons with narcissistic personalities are often drawn to conspiracy theories because they give the person a belief that they are privy to information that others are ignorant about. This phenomenon appears to increase with education, which is the opposite of how education tends to impact neurotypical persons.

== Causes ==
The cause of narcissistic personality disorder (NPD) is unclear, although there is evidence for a strong biological or genetic underpinning. It is unclear if or how much a person's upbringing contributes to the development of NPD, although many speculative theories have been proposed. Research on NPD is limited, because patients are hard to recruit for study.

Evidence to support social factors in the development of NPD is limited. Some studies have found NPD correlates with permissive and overindulgent parenting in childhood. Others have found correlations with harsh discipline, neglect or abuse. Findings have been inconsistent, and scientists do not know if these correlations are causal, as these studies do not control for genetic confounding.

This problem of genetic confounding is explained by psychologist Svenn Torgersen in a 2009 review:

If parents treat their children badly, and the children develop personality disorders, it does not necessarily mean that the treatment of the children is the cause of the development. An alternative explanation may be that the parents themselves have some personality disorder traits, partly due to genes. These genetically influenced traits correlate with poor parenting, explaining the genetic influence on parenting. The children inherit the genes and subsequently develop personality disorders. The personality disorders might thus have developed in any case, independent of the childhood conditions.

Twin studies allow scientists to assess the influence of genes and environment, in particular, how much of the variation in a trait is attributed to the "shared environment" (influences shared by twins, such as parents and upbringing) or the "unshared environment" (measurement error, noise, differing illnesses between twins, randomness in brain growth, and social or non-social experiences that only one twin experienced). According to a 2018 review, twin studies of NPD have found little or no influence from the shared environment, and a major contribution of genes and the non-shared environment:

Taken together, these studies have consistently demonstrated that genetic influence constitutes a major source of NPD. Non-shared environments also exert substantial influence on NPD. Notably, shared environments had no significant influence on NPD in any of these studies.

— Lu & Cai, 2018

According to neurogeneticist Kevin Mitchell, a lack of influence from the shared environment indicates that the non-shared environmental influence may be largely non-social, perhaps reflecting innate processes such as randomness in brain growth.

=== Pathophysiology ===
Neuroscientists have also studied the brains of people with NPD using structural imaging technology. A 2021 review concluded the most consistent finding among NPD patients is lowered gray matter volume in the medial prefrontal cortex, previously associated with self-enhancement tendencies. Studies of the occurrence of narcissistic personality disorder identified structural abnormalities in the brains of people with NPD, specifically, a lesser volume of gray matter in the left, anterior insular cortex. The results of a 2015 study associated the condition of NPD with a reduced volume of gray matter in the prefrontal cortex. It has been suggested that empathic dysfunction and selfish behaviour in NPD may result from dysfunction in the brain's salience network (SN; consisting of the anterior insula and cingulate cortices), which switches between internally- and externally-focused cognition, to inhibit the default mode network (DMN), involved in self-related information-processing, during social interactions resulting in continued self-focus even when interacting with distressed others. Consonantly, excessive selfishness in NPD appears to be related to decreased ability of the cingulate cortex to track motivational conflict between self-gain and other-pain.

Grandiose and vulnerable expressions of NPD appear to relate differently to brain structure and function. Specifically, NPD patients with grandiose features show enhanced while those with vulnerable features show reduced local efficiency in the DMN. Vulnerable cases of NPD also appear to show increased oxidative stress.

=== Other aspects ===
Evolutionary models of NPD have also been proposed. According to psychologist Marco Del Giudice, cluster B traits, including those of NPD, predict increased mating success and fertility. NPD could potentially be an adaptive evolutionary phenomenon, though a risky one that can sometimes result in social rejection and failure to reproduce. Another proposal is that NPD may result from an excess of traits which are only adaptive in moderate amounts (leadership success increases with moderate degrees of narcissism, but declines at the high end of narcissism).

== Diagnosis ==
A diagnosis of NPD, like other personality disorders, is made by a qualified healthcare professional in a clinical interview. Differential diagnosis is used in order to determine whether NPD is the most appropriate diagnosis.

=== Classification ===
Classification of personality disorders differs significantly between the two most prominent frameworks for classification of mental disorders, namely: the Diagnostic and Statistical Manual of Mental Disorders and the International Classification of Diseases, the most recent editions of which are the DSM-5-TR and ICD-11, respectively. In the DSM-5, there are two distinct diagnostic models for personality disorder. The classification system in its main body (Section II) is categorical, i.e., personality disorders are putatively distinct entities, whereas the hybrid dimensional–categorical Alternative DSM-5 model for personality disorders (AMPD) has been introduced into Section III. Replacing the previously used categorical model, the dimensional ICD-11 classification of personality disorders classifies personality disorders in terms of severity levels, with trait and pattern specifiers serving to characterize the particular style of pathology; hence, this classification does not specifically include NPD.

==== DSM-5 ====
In Section II, the categorical framework of previous DSM editions has been retained, with criteria for NPD remaining the same as in the DSM-IV-TR. Belonging to Cluster B, in this system, narcissistic personality disorder is characterized as "a pervasive pattern of grandiosity (in fantasy or behavior), need for admiration, and lack of empathy [...]", operationalized through the requirement that the person who receives the diagnosis meets at least five of nine specified criteria. These criteria are based on observable characteristics, such as an inordinate need to be held in high regard and a lofty view of oneself. This characterization of NPD represents overt, grandiose manifestations of a chronic nature; on the other hand, covert presentations and "inevitably coexist[ing]" vulnerability are unrepresented. It also lacks adequate coverage of psychological aspects that are central to NPD, such as experience of the self as being inferior and feelings of emptiness. Features like vulnerable self-esteem and the possibility that vulnerability is hidden are only mentioned in the section on "Associated Features Supporting Diagnosis" for NPD.

==== AMPD ====
In the AMPD, six specific personality disorders, including NPD, are defined through specific combinations of impairment in personality functioning (criterion A) as well as the presence of pathological personality traits (criterion B). The characteristics of NPD are described as typically encompassing "variable and vulnerable self-esteem, with attempts at regulation through attention- and approval-seeking, and either overt or covert grandiosity". For NPD, criterion A requires that at least two elements of personality functioning, these being: identity, self-direction, empathy and intimacy, must be impaired in a manner characteristic of NPD, while criterion B lists the following pathological traits, both of which are required: grandiosity and attention-seeking. Specifiers allow for additional traits to be specified; there are suggested additional traits of antagonism for "malignant narcissism", and traits of negative affectivity for "'vulnerable' presentations". Further requirements beyond traits and severity, for example relating to differential diagnosis, are embodied in criteria C–G. The AMPD definition of NPD better reflects the heterogeneity of pathological narcissism as encountered in clinical settings through the overt recognition of grandiosity presenting both overtly and covertly and through the model embodied in criterion A.

==== ICD-11 ====
Narcissistic personality disorder is not specifically included as a diagnosis in the ICD-11 classification of personality disorders, which relies on classification of global PD severity (i.e., Mild, Moderate, and Severe) and specification of one or more trait domains (i.e., Negative Affectivity, Detachment, Dissociality, Disinhibition, and Anankastia). Thus, the traditional PD types are abolished in favor of a new dimensional classification. Individuals with a Narcissistic PD may be characterized by features ranging from mild to severe PD, and studies have shown that it is almost consistently associated with the trait domain of Dissociality, and secondarily with both Anankastia and Disinhibition.

An ICD-11 case profile of a presentation aligning with anankastic and other specific (narcissistic) PD diagnoses in the ICD-10 could look like this.

Narcissistic features are essentially characterized by the trait domain of Dissociality with emphasis on self-centeredness. This pattern involves a sense of exploitativeness of others, believing and acting as if they deserve whatever they want with the expectation that this should be obvious to others. Such features of narcissism can be manifested as an expectation of others' admiration, attention-seeking behaviours to ensure being the center of others' focus, and anger or denigration of others when the admiration and attention that the individual expects are not granted. Typically, such individuals believe that their accomplishments are outstanding, that they have many admirable qualities, that they have or will achieve greatness, and that others should admire them. The primary association with this domain aligns with the self-centeredness, entitlement, expectation of others' admiration, and lack of empathy which it is defined by.

The association with Anankastia may indicate "narcissistic perfectionism"; many people with NPD, in order to keep up with a subjective sense of superiority, are also characterized by the trait domain of Anankastia in terms of perfectionism and vanity, which serves to enhance competitiveness, self-esteem, and grandiose self-presentations. Accordingly, the combination of Dissociality and Anankastia may often indicate distinct features of narcissism, including perfectionistic overcompensation and rule-bound narcissistic dominance. The association with Disinhibition may indicate a tendency to overestimate own abilities (i.e., recklessness), difficulty delaying reward and satisfaction due to a sense of entitlement (i.e., impulsivity), and a narcissistic pattern of procrastination instead of making a realistic plan for their lives (i.e., irresponsibility and lack of planning).

Additional features of Negative Affectivity in terms of vulnerability, depression, anger, hostility, and shame may also capture vulnerable manifestations of narcissism. Thus, the combination of Dissociality and Negative Affectivity may characterize some individuals with vulnerable narcissism who are ruminating over perceived slights or insults from others, are overreactive to criticism, and have a low frustration tolerance that easily makes them become overtly or covertly upset over even minor issues. Their low self-esteem may manifest as envy of others' abilities and success, and it may also be driven by shameful experiences of repeated failures and procrastinations in their lives.

=== Differential diagnosis ===
Features of narcissistic personality disorder may appear similar to symptoms stemming from other mental disorders. Narcissistic traits may also appear in "highly successful individuals", as stated in the DSM-5; in order to qualify for a diagnosis of NPD, the traits must be "inflexible, maladaptive, and persisting, and cause significant functional impairment or subjective distress". Disorders for consideration in differential diagnosis are other personality disorders, mania and hypomania, symptoms stemming from substance use disorders, anxiety disorders and depressive disorders. In regards to personality disorders, differential diagnosis mainly concerns antisocial (ASPD), borderline (BPD) and histrionic (HPD) personality disorders, these being the other cluster B disorders. Other personality disorders may, per the DSM-5, also be diagnosed alongside NPD if their criteria are also met.

Superficiality, exploitativeness, and lack of empathy characterize ASPD in addition to NPD. These disorders are different in that the latter is not characterized by an unmitigated absence of morals and loyalty, even in severe presentations; these are however features of ASPD. People with ASPD also have a tendency to have had conduct disorder in childhood, which is also not typical for NPD. Other ASPD features not necessarily present in NPD are aggression, impulsivity and deception. In regards to BPD, features that differentiate it from NPD are that the former entails impulsivity, self-destructiveness, and worry about abandonment, as well as an unstable sense of self; the self-image in NPD, on the other hand, is characterized by "relative stability". Expression of emotion is more noticeable in HPD than in NPD, with "a relative lack of emotional display" being a feature of the latter. In contrast to those with NPD, people with HPD may employ vulnerability in order to elicit attention. While attention-seeking is a feature of both HPD and BPD, admiration is central to the attention desired by those with NPD; moreover, in regards to the aforementioned PDs as well as to ASPD, the most distinguishing feature of NPD is grandiosity.

Other personality disorders to be differentiated from NPD are: obsessive–compulsive (OCPD), paranoid (PPD) and schizotypal (StPD). Perfectionism, a belief that others are incompetent, as well as lack of generosity are features of OCPD that may also be present in NPD; however, these features manifest in different manners for the two disorders. Regarding the former two features, a person with NPD is likely to view themselves as having accomplished the perfection they strive for; in contrast, people with OCPD tend to be self-critical. Moreover, people with OCPD are likely to apply miserliness to themselves as well as to others, whereas people with NPD may be willing to spend money on themselves while not being generous towards others. Stemming "primarily from fears of having imperfections or flaws revealed", social withdrawal and suspiciousness may also occur in people with NPD; otherwise, PPD and StPD differ from NPD through the presence of these features.

Apparent similarities exist between NPD and mania and hypomania, which encompass traits such as irritability, grandiosity and heightened levels of goal-directed activity. Atypical for mania, however, devaluation of other people as well as a pursuit of attention are distinguishing features of NPD. Furthermore, NPD does not entail a decreased need for sleep, nor the functional impairments or mood change that characterize episodes of hypomania or mania. Also, while NPD remains stable over time, mania and hypomania occur in episodes; these are also amenable to pharmacological treatment, which NPD is not.

It is common for children and adolescents to display personality traits that resemble NPD, but such occurrences are usually transient, and register below the clinical criteria for a formal diagnosis of NPD.

== Subtypes ==
Although the DSM-5 diagnostic criteria for NPD has been viewed as homogeneous, there are a variety of subtypes used for classification of NPD. There is poor consensus on how many subtypes exist, but there is broad acceptance that there are at least two: grandiose or overt narcissism, and vulnerable or covert narcissism. However, none of the subtypes of NPD are recognized in the DSM-5 or in the ICD-11.

=== Empirically verified subtypes ===
Some research has indicated the existence of three subtypes of NPD, which can be distinguished by symptom criteria, comorbidity and other clinical criteria. These are as follows:

Grandiose/overt: the group exhibits grandiosity, entitlement, interpersonal exploitativeness and manipulation, pursuit of power and control, lack of empathy and remorse, and marked irritability and hostility. This group was noted for high levels of comorbid antisocial and paranoid personality disorders, substance abuse, externalizing, unemployment and greater likelihood of violence. Of note, Russ et al. observed that this group "do not appear to suffer from underlying feelings of inadequacy or to be prone to negative affect states other than anger", an observation corroborated by recent research which found this variant to show strong inverse associations with depressive, anxious-avoidant, and dependant/victimised features.

Vulnerable/covert: this variant is defined by feelings of shame, envy, resentment, and inferiority (which is occasionally "masked" by arrogance), entitlement, a belief that one is misunderstood or unappreciated, and excessive reactivity to slights or criticism. This variant is associated with elevated levels of neuroticism, psychological distress, depression, and anxiety. Recent research suggests that vulnerable narcissism is mostly the product of dysfunctional levels of neuroticism. Vulnerable narcissism is sometimes comorbid with diagnoses of avoidant, borderline and dependent personality disorders.

High-functioning/exhibitionistic: A third subtype for classifying people with NPD, initially theorized by psychiatrist Glen Gabbard, is termed high functioning or exhibitionistic. This variant has been described as "high functioning narcissists [who] were grandiose, competitive, attention-seeking, and sexually provocative; they tended to show adaptive functioning and utilize their narcissistic traits to succeed." This group has been found to have relatively few psychological issues and high rates of obsessive–compulsive personality disorder, with excessive perfectionism posited as a potential cause for their impairment.

=== Others ===
Oblivious/hypervigilant: Glen Gabbard described two subtypes of NPD in 1989, later referred to as equivalent to, the grandiose and vulnerable subtypes. The first was the "oblivious" subtype of narcissist, equivalent to the grandiose subtype. This group was described as being grandiose, arrogant and thick-skinned, while also exhibiting personality traits of helplessness and emotional emptiness, low self-esteem and shame. These were observed in people with NPD to be expressed as socially avoidant behavior in situations where self-presentation is difficult or impossible, leading to withdrawal from situations where social approval is not given.

The second subtype Gabbard described was termed "hypervigilant", equivalent to the vulnerable subtype. People with this subtype of NPD were described as having easily hurt feelings, an oversensitive temperament, and persistent feelings of shame.

==== Millon's subtypes ====
In the study Disorders of Personality: DSM-IV-TM and Beyond (1996), Theodore Millon suggested five subtypes of NPD, although he did not identify specific treatments per subtype.

Subtype	Traits
Unprincipled narcissist	Deficient conscience; unscrupulous, amoral, disloyal, fraudulent, deceptive, arrogant, exploitive; a con artist and charlatan; dominating, contemptuous, vindictive.
Amorous narcissist	Sexually seductive, enticing, beguiling, tantalizing; glib and clever; disinclined to real intimacy; indulges hedonistic desires; bewitches and inveigles others; pathological lying and swindling. Tends to have many affairs.
Compensatory narcissist	Seeks to counteract or cancel out deep feelings of inferiority and lack of self-esteem; offsets deficits by creating illusions of being superior, exceptional, admirable, noteworthy; self-worth results from self-enhancement.
Elitist narcissist	Feels privileged and empowered by virtue of special childhood status and pseudo-achievements; entitled façade bears little relation to reality; seeks favored and good life; is upwardly mobile; cultivates special status and advantages by association.
Normal narcissist	Least severe and most interpersonally concerned and empathetic, still entitled and deficient in reciprocity; bold in environments, self-confident, competitive, seeks high targets, feels unique; talent in leadership positions; expecting recognition from others.

==== Masterson's subtypes (exhibitionist and closet) ====
In 1993, James F. Masterson proposed two subtypes for pathological narcissism, exhibitionist and closet. Both fail to adequately develop an age- and phase- appropriate self because of defects in the quality of psychological nurturing provided, usually by the mother. A person with exhibitionist narcissism is similar to NPD described in the DSM-IV and differs from closet narcissism in several ways. A person with closet narcissism is more likely to be described as having a deflated, inadequate self-perception and greater awareness of emptiness within. A person with exhibitionist narcissism would be described as having an inflated, grandiose self-perception with little or no conscious awareness of feelings of emptiness. Such a person would assume that their condition was normal and that others were just like them. A person with closet narcissism is described to seek constant approval from others and appears similar to those with borderline personality disorder in the need to please others. A person with exhibitionist narcissism seeks perfect admiration all the time from others.

==== Malignant narcissism ====
Malignant narcissism, a term first coined in Erich Fromm's 1964 book The Heart of Man: Its Genius for Good and Evil, is a syndrome consisting of a combination of NPD, antisocial personality disorder, and paranoid traits. A person with malignant narcissism was described as deriving higher levels of psychological gratification from accomplishments over time, suspected to worsen the disorder. Because a person with malignant narcissism becomes more involved in psychological gratification, it was suspected to be a risk factor for developing antisocial, paranoid, and schizoid personality disorders. The term malignant is added to the term narcissist to indicate that individuals with this disorder have a severe form of narcissistic disorder that is characterized also by features of paranoia, psychopathy (anti-social behaviors), aggression, and sadism.

==== Historical demarcation of grandiose and vulnerable types ====
Over the years, many clinicians and theorists have described two variants of NPD akin to the grandiose and vulnerable expressions of trait narcissism. Some examples include:

	Grandiose Phenotype	Vulnerable Types
Kohut & Wolf (1978)	Mirror-hungry	Ideal-hungry
Broucek (1982)	Egotistical	Dissociative
Rosenfeld (1987)	Thick-skinned	Thin-skinned
Gabbard (1989, 1998, 2009)	Oblivious	Hypervigilant
Gersten (1991)	Overly grandiose	Overly vulnerable
Wink (1992)	Willful	Hypersensitive
Masterson (1993)	Exhibitionist	Closet
Fiscalini (1993)	Special child	Shamed child
Cooper and Maxwell (1995)	Empowered	Disempowered

== Assessment and screening ==
=== Narcissistic Personality Inventory ===
Risk factors for NPD and grandiose/overt and vulnerable/covert subtypes are measured using the narcissistic personality inventory, an assessment tool originally developed in 1979, which has undergone multiple iterations with new versions in 1984, 2006 and 2014. It captures principally grandiose narcissism, but also seems to capture elements of vulnerability. A popular three-factor model has it that grandiose narcissism is assessed via the Leadership/Authority and Grandiose/Exhibitionism facets, while a combination of grandiose and vulnerable traits are indexed by the Entitlement/Exploitativeness facet.

=== Pathological Narcissism Inventory ===
The Pathological Narcissism Inventory (PNI) was designed to measure fluctuations in grandiose and vulnerable narcissistic states, similar to what is ostensibly observed by some clinicians (though empirical demonstration of this phenomenon is lacking). While having both "grandiosity" and vulnerability scales, empirically both seem to primarily capture vulnerable narcissism.

The PNI scales show significant associations with parasuicidal behavior, suicide attempts, homicidal ideation, and several aspects of psychotherapy utilization.

=== Five-Factor Narcissism Inventory ===
In 2013, the Five-Factor Narcissism Inventory (FFNI) was defined as a comprehensive assay of grandiose and vulnerable expressions of trait narcissism. The scale measures 11 traits of grandiose narcissism and 4 traits of vulnerable narcissism, both of which correlate with clinical ratings of NPD (with grandiose features of arrogance, grandiose fantasies, manipulativeness, entitlement and exploitativeness showing stronger relations). Later analysis revealed that the FFNI actually measures three factors:

1. Agentic Extraversion: an exaggerated sense of self-importance, grandiose fantasies, striving for greatness and acclaim, social dominance and authoritativeness, and exhibitionistic, charming interpersonal conduct.
2. Self-Centred Antagonism: disdain for others, psychological entitlement, interpersonally exploitative and manipulative behaviour, lack of empathy, anger in response to criticism or rebuke, suspiciousness, and thrill-seeking.
3. Narcissistic Neuroticism: shame-proneness, oversensitivity and negative emotionality to criticism and rebuke, and excessive need for admiration to maintain self-esteem.

Grandiose narcissism is a combination of agency and antagonism, and vulnerability is a combination of antagonism and neuroticism. The three factors show differential associations with clinically important variables. Agentic traits are associated with high self-esteem, positive view of others and the future, autonomous and authentic living, commitment to personal growth, sense of purpose in life and life satisfaction. Neurotic traits show precisely the opposite correlation with all of these variables, while antagonistic traits show more complex associations; they are associated with negative view of others (but not necessarily of the self), a sense of alienation from their 'true self', disinterest in personal growth, negative relationships with others, and all forms of aggression.

=== Millon Clinical Multiaxial Inventory ===
The Millon Clinical Multiaxial Inventory (MCMI) is another diagnostic test developed by Theodore Millon. The MCMI includes a scale for narcissism. The NPI and MCMI have been found to be well correlated. Whereas the MCMI measures narcissistic personality disorder (NPD), the NPI measures narcissism as it occurs in the general population; the MCMI is a screening tool. In other words, the NPI measures "normal" narcissism; i.e., most people who score very high on the NPI do not have NPD. Indeed, the NPI does not capture any sort of narcissism taxon as would be expected if it measured NPD.

== Management ==
Psychotherapy is the predominant approach to treatment of narcissistic personality disorder. Research regarding management of NPD is limited, with the efficacy of psychotherapeutic treatment of NPD having inadequate support in studies; whereas case studies have been conducted, there is no sufficiently robust systematic or empirical evidence, such as randomized clinical trials. There is no evidence supporting the use of psychopharmacological therapy for NPD. Moreover, there are no guidelines based on evidence for treatment of this disorder.

Psychotherapeutic treatment falls into two general categories: psychoanalytic/psychodynamic and cognitive behavioral. Psychoanalytic therapies include schema therapy, transference focused psychotherapy, mentalization-based treatment and metacognitive psychotherapy. Cognitive behavioral therapies include cognitive behavioral therapy and dialectal behavior therapy. Formats also include group therapy and couples therapy. The specific choice of treatment varies based on individual presentations.

Medications such as antidepressants, which treat depression, are commonly prescribed by healthcare providers; mood stabilizers to reduce mood swings and antipsychotic drugs to reduce the prevalence of psychotic episodes. Psychopharmacological treatment can prove useful for treating comorbid disorders.

Therapy is complicated by the lack of treatment-seeking behavior in people with NPD, despite mental distress. Additionally, people with narcissistic personality disorders have decreased life satisfaction and lower qualities of life, irrespective of diagnosis. People with NPD often present with comorbid mental disorders, complicating diagnosis and treatment. NPD is rarely the primary reason for which people seek mental health treatment. When people with NPD enter treatment (psychologic or psychiatric), they often express seeking relief from a comorbid mental disorder, including major depressive disorder, a substance use disorder (drug addiction), or bipolar disorder.

== Prognosis ==
Improvement in people with NPD is possible and has been documented in clinical settings. This occurs slowly over time; even then, narcissistic pathology has been documented to remain, including in people whose symptoms of NPD are ameliorated. This is likely to be reflected in the differing results found when assessing improvement in accordance with dimensional and categorical models, respectively; while persistence of the disorder is found when assessing it dimensionally, there has been a tendency towards symptomatic improvement in those assessed by means of categorical diagnosis. An explanation for this may likely be that core problems of narcissistic nature remain, while other personality disorders occurring together with NPD may also play a role.

The presence of NPD in patients undergoing psychotherapy for the treatment of other mental disorders is associated with slower treatment progress and higher dropout rates. In this therapy, the goals often are examining traits and behaviors that negatively affect life, identifying ways these behaviors cause distress to the person and others, exploring early experiences that contributed to narcissistic defenses, developing new coping mechanisms to replace those defenses, helping the person see themselves and others in more realistic and nuanced ways, rather than wholly good or wholly bad, identifying and practicing more helpful patterns of behavior, developing interpersonal skills, and learning to consider the needs and feelings of others.

== Epidemiology ==
The epidemiology of NPD remains uncertain, partly because relatively few large-scale population studies have assessed the disorder and because prevalence estimates vary substantially depending on diagnostic methods and study populations. In general, clinical samples have been the basis of the majority of empidemiological research on NPD.

=== Prevalence ===
Estimates of prevalence in the general population range from 0% to 6.2%. Ranges reported for prevalence in clinical populations are 1.3%–22% and 1%–17%. It is likely that a cause of inconsistency in the prevalence data is a shift in the definition of NPD towards capturing overt grandiosity rather than vulnerability. This is particularly contrasted with the prevalence of actual diagnoses of NPD conferred in routine clinical practice, which can be as low as 0.8%.

Using the DSM-IV definition of NPD, a 2008 study based on data from the Wave 2 National Epidemiologic Survey on Alcoholism and Related Conditions – conducted in the United States from 2004 to 2005 – has shown the lifetime prevalence of NPD to be 6.2%. At 7.7%, the prevalence among men was found to be higher than that among women, this being 4.8%. The same study presented a significantly higher prevalence of NPD among Black men and women and Hispanic women, young adults, as well as people who had been divorced, widowed, separated, or who had never married.

=== Comorbidity ===
Several mental disorders are comorbid with NPD, these being substance use disorders, bipolar disorder, other personality disorders, anorexia nervosa, anxiety disorders, and post-traumatic stress disorder. There is also a higher likelihood of suicide. Regarding substance use, cocaine is particularly prominent in the case of NPD. The reason for comorbidity with bipolar disorder is not known; it may stem from both disorders encompassing similar symptoms, i.e., heightened self-esteem and grandiosity, which are also present in mania (see § Differential diagnosis) or from a "shared vulnerability". Regarding other personality disorders, the most frequently comorbid types are: antisocial, histrionic, borderline, schizotypal, and passive–aggressive. As classified in the ICD-11, comorbidity among personality disorders is not possible. Moreover, the subtypes of NPD are associated with different comorbid conditions: while the grandiose subtype is associated with antisocial and paranoid PDs and substance abuse, the vulnerable subtype more frequently occurs together with depression and anxiety as well as suicide attempts and non-suicidal self-injury.

== History ==
=== Origin of narcissism as a concept ===
The term "narcissism" comes from the first century (written in the year 8 AD) narrative poem the Metamorphoses by the Roman poet Ovid. Book III of the Metamorphoses features a myth about two main characters, Narcissus and Echo. Narcissus is a handsome young man who spurns the advances of many potential lovers. When Narcissus rejects Echo, a nymph cursed to only echo the sounds that others made, the goddess Nemesis punishes him by making him fall in love with his own reflection in a pool of water. When Narcissus discovers that the object of his love cannot love him back, he slowly pines away and dies.

The concept of excessive selfishness has been recognized throughout history. In ancient Greece, the concept was understood as hubris. It is only since the late 1800s that narcissism has been defined in psychological terms:

- Havelock Ellis (1898) was the first psychologist to use the term when he linked the myth to the condition in one of his patients.
- Sigmund Freud (1905–1953) used the terms "narcissistic libido" in his Three Essays on the Theory of Sexuality.
- Ernest Jones (1913/1951) was the first to construe extreme narcissism as a character flaw.
- Robert Waelder (1925) published the first case study of narcissism. His patient was a successful scientist with an attitude of superiority, an obsession with fostering self-respect, and a lack of normal feelings of guilt. The patient was aloof and independent from others and had an inability to empathize with others' situations, and was selfish sexually. Waelder's patient was also overly logical and analytical and valued abstract intellectual thought (thinking for thinking's sake) over the practical application of scientific knowledge.

Narcissistic personality was first described by the psychoanalyst Robert Waelder in 1925. The term narcissistic personality disorder (NPD) was coined by Heinz Kohut in 1968. Waelder's initial study has been influential in the way narcissism and the clinical disorder Narcissistic personality disorder are defined today

=== Freudianism and psychoanalysis ===
Much of the early history of narcissism and NPD originates from psychoanalysis. Regarding the adult neurotic's sense of omnipotence, Sigmund Freud said that "this belief is a frank acknowledgement of a relic of the old megalomania of infancy"; and concluded that: "we can detect an element of megalomania in most other forms of paranoic disorder. We are justified in assuming that this megalomania is essentially of an infantile nature, and that, as development proceeds, it is sacrificed to social considerations."

Narcissistic injury and narcissistic scar are terms used by Freud in the 1920s. Narcissistic wound and narcissistic blow are other, almost interchangeable, terms. When wounded in the ego, either by a real or a perceived criticism, a narcissistic person's displays of anger can be disproportionate to the nature of the criticism suffered; but typically, the actions and responses of the NPD person are deliberate and calculated. Despite occasional flare-ups of personal insecurity, the inflated self-concept of the NPD person is primarily stable.

In The Psychology of Gambling (1957), Edmund Bergler considered megalomania to be a normal occurrence in the psychology of a child, a condition later reactivated in adult life, if the individual takes up gambling. In The Psychoanalytic Theory of Neurosis (1946), Otto Fenichel said that people who, in their later lives, respond with denial to their own narcissistic injury usually undergo a similar regression to the megalomania of childhood.

==== Narcissistic supply ====
Narcissistic supply was a concept introduced by Otto Fenichel in 1938, to describe a type of admiration, interpersonal support, or sustenance drawn by an individual from his or her environment and essential to their self-esteem. The term is typically used in a negative sense, describing a pathological or excessive need for attention or admiration that does not take into account the feelings, opinions, or preferences of other people.

==== Narcissistic rage ====
The term narcissistic rage was a concept introduced by Heinz Kohut in 1972. Narcissistic rage was theorised as a reaction to a perceived threat to a narcissist's self-esteem or self-worth. Narcissistic rage occurs on a continuum from aloofness, to expressions of mild irritation or annoyance, to serious outbursts, including violent attacks.

Narcissistic rage reactions are not necessarily limited to narcissistic personality disorder. They may also be seen in catatonic, paranoid delusion, and depressive episodes.

=== Object relations ===
In the second half of the 20th century, in contrast to Freud's perspective of megalomania as an obstacle to psychoanalysis, in the U.S. and UK Kleinian psychologists used the object relations theory to re-evaluate megalomania as a defence mechanism. This Kleinian therapeutic approach built upon Heinz Kohut's view of narcissistic megalomania as an aspect of normal mental development, by contrast with Otto Kernberg's consideration of such grandiosity as a pathological distortion of normal psychological development.

To the extent that people are pathologically narcissistic, the person with NPD can be a self-absorbed individual who passes blame by psychological projection and is intolerant of contradictory views and opinions; is apathetic towards the emotional, mental, and psychological needs of other people; and is indifferent to the negative effects of their behaviors, whilst insisting that people should see them as an ideal person. The merging of the terms "inflated self-concept" and "actual self" is evident in later research on the grandiosity component of narcissistic personality disorder, along with incorporating the defence mechanisms of idealization and devaluation and of denial.

=== Modern diagnosis ===
When mental disorders were introduced for the first time in the sixth edition of the International Classification of Disease system (ICD), the diagnosis "narcissistic personality disorder" was not included, nor did it appear in subsequent editions 7, 8, or 9; and in the ICD-10 it is included by name only: a number of specific personality disorders (e.g., paranoid, schizoid, histrionic, etc.) are listed in the ICD-10 classification of personality disorders, along with short descriptions of their key features; however narcissism is included by name only under "Other specific personality disorders" with descriptive content entirely absent.

This omission of NPD stands in contrast with the Diagnostic and Statistical Manual of Mental Disorders (DSM), into which NPD was introduced as a diagnostic category in its third edition (DSM-III, 1980). Post DSM-III, a broader meta-theoretical paradigm shift took place that re-conceptualized diagnostic criteria from a mixed polythetic and monothetic diagnostic format, to a solely polythetic approach in an effort to standardize diagnostic systems and increase the precision and reliability of diagnoses. Resulting criteria for NPD emphasized explicit grandiosity (e.g., superiority, grandiose fantasy, envy, haughtiness, etc.) over more vulnerable features, conflicting with decades of theoretical, clinical and empirical work.

Following sustained criticisms regarding issues of stigma, arbitrary thresholds, comorbidity and clinical utility, a major metatheoretical shift occurred again with the DSM-5 publication of the AMPD and more recently with the new model for personality disorder in the ICD-11. These approaches use a severity and trait model where clinicians first assess the degree of impairment in core areas of "self" and "interpersonal" functioning, then additionally specify the presence of maladaptive personality traits. Ongoing contention regarding the empirical status of NPD led to it nearly being removed altogether as a diagnostic entity in the personality disorder classification system that was being developed for the DSM-5; however, strong objection by expert clinical and empirical researchers in the field led to it being retained.

==== Categorical DSM diagnosis ====
As defined through a mixed monothetic and polythetic set of crtieria in the DSM-III, NPD included hallmark "grandiose" features of narcissism (i.e., Criterion A, B, C: self-importance and uniqueness, grandiose fantasy, exhibitionism), explicit "vulnerable" elements (i.e., Criterion D: feelings of rage, inferiority, shame, humiliation or emptiness due to ego threat), and disturbances in interpersonal relationships (i.e., Criterion E: entitlement and non-reciprocation, interpersonal exploitativeness, idealization and devaluation, lacking empathy). This definition stemmed from a review of literature from before 1978, without empirical research. A revised set of criteria for NPD was introduced into the DSM-III-R (1987), resulting in a fully polythetic format, meaning that no one criterion must necessarily be met by all people diagnosed with the disorder; instead, in accordance with this system, meeting any five out of nine available criteria is sufficient for a diagnosis.

With the introduction of the DSM-IV, several criteria for NPD were changed from the DSM-III-R; one criterion was also removed while another one was added. The removal concerned Criterion 1 – i.e., "Reacts to criticism with feelings of rage, shame, or humiliation (even if not expressed)" – due to it pertaining to borderline and paranoid PD to a similar degree as to NPD. The added criterion (i.e., "shows arrogant, haughty behaviors or attitudes") was added in order to capture apparent features of NPD not previously embodied in the extant criteria. Several retained criteria were reworded in order to better differentiate NPD from antisocial, avoidant, borderline, histrionic, paranoid, passive–aggressive and schizoid personality disorders. For the DSM-IV-TR (2000), no criteria were changed; later, they were also carried over verbatim into Section II of the DSM-5.

The American Psychiatric Association's (APA) formulation, description, and definition of narcissistic personality disorder, as published in the Diagnostic and Statistical Manual of Mental Disorders, Fourth Ed., Text Revision (DSM-IV-TR, 2000), was criticised by clinicians as inadequately describing the range and complexity of the personality disorder that is NPD. That it is excessively focused upon "the narcissistic individual's external, symptomatic, or social interpersonal patterns – at the expense of ... internal complexity and individual suffering", which reduced the clinical utility of the NPD definition in the DSM-IV-TR.

==== Dimensional and hybrid models ====
Due to several shortcomings of the DSM-IV approach to personality disorders and in order to increase the validity of personality disorder diagnosis, the Personality and Personality Disorders Work Group – responsible for personality disorders in the development of the DSM-5 – gradually developed a hybrid dimensional–categorical framework for personality disorders. The Work Group proposed in 2010 that five of the DSM-IV personality disorder diagnoses, including NPD, be excluded from this new model; instead of being a standalone diagnosis, NPD was instead to be captured through severity of impairment as well as trait profile of the person diagnosed, in a diagnosis of Personality Disorder–Trait Specified. Substantial controversy emerged in regards to this matter, with the retention of NPD garnering particularly strong support in the field. In the end, NPD was included in the new framework, which did however not replace the extant categorical framework; instead, it was placed in Section III ("Emerging measures and models") due to the board of trustees of the American Psychiatric Association voting to retain the categorical system.

The ICD-11 has adopted a dimensional classification of personality disorders that abolishes the established categorical PD types (e.g., "narcissistic") in favor of classifying global severity of a unified personality disorder diagnosis with specification of individual trait domains. This has raised questions regarding how PD categories should be understood within this dimensional framework. In contrast to, for instance, schizoid PD – which ostensibly corresponds well to the Detachment domain – characterization of NPD is less trivial. Research has been conducted in order to enable evidence-based pairing of PD categories with ICD-11 trait domains.

== Society and culture ==
=== Stigma ===
While there has been little empirical research into the matter, it is generally believed that there is significant stigmatization of NPD. Negative attitudes towards narcissism and "narcissists" are widespread in society, while the public's understanding of these concepts is limited and frequently inaccurate. Common beliefs are that NPD is not an "illness" to the same degree as are obsessive–compulsive and paranoid personality disorders and that it is not deserving of nor amenable to treatment. In a study based on interviews of "mental health clinicians who have experience treating patients with NPD", participants described the public's view on NPD such that they commonly believe that NPD is untreatable as well as controllable by the affected individuals, and they are assumed to be aggressive. Among clinicians, the stigma was described as being greater among those with less training in the treatment of NPD, with those having more training holding less stigma. Regarding stigma faced by people with NPD, the participants described it leading those affected to be disinclined to let others know about their diagnosis and to them internalizing negative stereotypes about the condition.

=== Media depictions ===
- Suzanne Stone-Maretto, Nicole Kidman's character in the film To Die For (1995), wants to appear on television at all costs, even if this involves murdering her husband. A psychiatric assessment of her character noted that she "was seen as a prototypical narcissistic person by the raters: on average, she satisfied 8 of 9 criteria for narcissistic personality disorder... had she been evaluated for personality disorders, she would receive a diagnosis of narcissistic personality disorder".
- Jay Gatsby, the eponymous character of F. Scott Fitzgerald's novel The Great Gatsby (1925), "an archetype of self-made American men seeking to join high society", has been described by English professor Giles Mitchell as a "pathological narcissist" for whom the "ego-ideal" has become "inflated and destructive" and whose "grandiose lies, poor sense of reality, sense of entitlement, and exploitive treatment of others" conspire toward his own demise.

== See also ==
- Identity disturbance
- Messiah complex
- Narcissistic neurosis
- Superiority complex
- True self and false self
