= Narcissistic Personality Inventory =

1979 research measure of narcissism

The Narcissistic Personality Inventory (NPI) was developed in 1979 by Raskin and Hall, and since then, has become one of the most widely utilized personality measures for non-clinical levels of the trait narcissism. Since its initial development, the NPI has evolved from 220 items to the more commonly employed NPI-40 (1984) and NPI-16 (2006), as well as the novel NPI-1 inventory (2014). Derived from the DSM-III criteria for Narcissistic Personality Disorder (NPD), the NPI has been employed heavily by personality and social psychology researchers.

The NPI is not intended for use in diagnosing Narcissistic Personality Disorder. Rather, it is often said to measure "normal" or "subclinical" narcissism.

== General Formatting of the NPI ==
[edit] When the NPI was created in 1979, it originally had 54 questions, which was then reduced to 40 after reconsideration and additional testing by Raskin and Terry in 1988. From these 40 questions, they evaluated seven dimensions presented in the test: Vanity, Entitlement, Authority, Self-Sufficiency, Superiority, Exhibitionism, and Exploitativeness. The test is administered in a binary format, where questions are structured by comparing an answer that would express one of the seven dimensions above and one that would not. An example of one is below:

Which one of these do you agree with more?

"I am not good at influencing people" or "I have a natural talent for influencing people"

Participants circle which answer they agree with. Scoring is completed after the participant finishes the full exam. This Dichotomous language allows graders to avoid central tendencies bias. The average NPI score in the US is around 16 to 17

== Psychometric properties ==
The psychometric properties of the NPI have been continually investigated since its creation in 1979, both by original creators Raskin and Hall, as well as a variety of researchers to come, including: Emmons, Bushman & Baumeister, and Rhodewalt & Morf. According to reliability and validity research conducted by Raskin and Hall, the NPI has strong construct validity and ecological validity. When five factor model (FFM) profiles were created, expert-rated and meta-analytic studies established high correlation to the NPI profiles, indicating high reliability pertaining to personality trait and behavior correlations. These correlations are supported by research conducted by Raskin and Hall, as well as Emmons, in which strong, positive correlations to extraversion and psychoticism were found.

The NPI has weak convergent validity and some items have been argued not to reflect the central dogma of narcissism (e.g. "I see myself as a good leader"). Additionally, the factor structure of the NPI has been questioned. In research conducted by Emmons, four factors were identified through principal components analysis (PCA), including: leadership/authority, self-admiration/self-absorption, superiority/arrogance, and exploitativeness/entitlement. More recently, research by Kubarych, Deary, and Austin have identified two factors, including: power and exhibitionism. Corry, Merritt, Mrug, and Pamp also identified two factors, including: leadership/authority and exhibitionism/entitlement. Generally, variations in data reduction techniques have been partially attributed to factor structure issues.

The NPI has also been found to have poor internal consistency.

== Applications ==
The NPI is used in many organizations as a part of the hiring process. It is primarily used in areas where high self-serving tendencies, positively correlated to narcissism, may be a very negative aspect in the job. The NPI can not be used solely as a means of rejection, but it can be used to expect certain behaviors on the job. Some organizations pursue narcissism in the individual as a good trait, especially for leadership positions or in a group where creativity is considered a good measure.

== Criticisms of NPI ==
Many criticisms of the NPI call into question its validity. It has been shown that scores on the NPI are positively correlated with self-esteem, with some arguing that the test could be producing false-positives for healthy individuals. Others have argued that this outcome is expected and those expressing narcissistic traits would also express traits indicative of high self-esteem. Other studies have shown that subjects diagnosed with Narcissistic Personality Disorder actually score lower on self-esteem measured with the Rosenberg Self-Esteem Scale than a group of healthy controls, revealing more about why the NPI is not a valid way to diagnose people with NPD. In addition to validity issues, the internal consistency of the NPI has been brought into question by del Rosario and White. In a study examining the test-retest reliability and internal consistency of the NPI, results showed an insufficiency in both test and retest alpha coefficients of the narcissism component scales in comparison to the original Raskin and Terry (1988) results.

== Alternatives to NPI ==
Given the criticisms and questionable psychometric properties of Raskin and Terry's seven factors, Foster et al. (2015) created the Grandiose Narcissism Scale (GNS), which provides a more concentrated and psychometrically rigorous index of these seven factors.

Other tests have been developed to measure narcissism and its more specific components such as grandiosity, exploitativeness, and entitlement. The Pathological Narcissism Inventory (PNI), Narcissistic Grandiosity Scale (NGS), Interpersonal Exploitativeness Scale (IES) and Psychological Entitlement Scale (PES) are among those tests that have been researched to replace the NPI, though some don't directly measure narcissism and instead measure a subcategory of narcissism like Entitlement. Elements of the Five Factor Model have also been used to measure narcissism and, although these tests show significant correlations with most other scales, some researchers suggest that these tests aren't quite ready to replace the NPI until more research has been done. The Eysenck Personality Questionnaire's Psychoticism and Extraversion scales have been shown to have a significant positive correlation with the NPI's narcissism measure, though the combination of the scales produced much stronger correlations than either of the scales alone. These strong positive correlations with other scales show that the NPI has good construct validity.

== See also ==
- Hypersensitive Narcissism Scale
