= Narcissistic withdrawal =

Stage in narcissism

In psychology, narcissistic withdrawal is a stage in narcissism and a narcissistic defense characterized by "turning away from parental figures, and by the fantasy that essential needs can be satisfied by the individual alone". In adulthood, it is more likely to be an ego defense with repressed origins. Individuals feel obliged to withdraw from any relationship that threatens to be more than short-term, avoiding the risk of narcissistic injury, and will instead retreat into a comfort zone. The idea was first described by Melanie Klein in her psychoanalytic research on stages of narcissism in children.

== Psychoanalysis ==
Sigmund Freud originally used the term narcissism to denote the process of the projection of the individual's libido from its object onto themselves; his essay "On Narcissism" saw him explore the idea through an examination of such everyday events as illness or sleep: "the condition of sleep, too, resembles illness in implying a narcissistic withdrawal of the positions of the libido on to the subject's own self". Later, in "Mourning and Melancholia", he examined how "a withdrawal of the libido [...] on a narcissistic basis" in depression could allow both a freezing and a preservation of affection: "by taking flight into the ego, love escapes extinction".

Otto Fenichel would extend his analysis to borderline conditions, demonstrating how "in a reactive withdrawal of libido [...], a regression to narcissism is also a regression to the primal narcissistic omnipotence which makes its reappearance in the form of megalomania".

For Melanie Klein, however, a more positive element came to the forefront: "frustration, which stimulates narcissistic withdrawal, is also [...] a fundamental factor in adaptation to reality". Similarly, D. W. Winnicott observed "that there is an aspect of withdrawal that is healthy", considering that it might be "helpful to think of withdrawal as a condition in which the person concerned (child or adult) holds a regressed part of the self and nurses it, at the expense of external relationships".

Differing from the prior perspectives of psychoanalysts, Heinz Kohut considered that "the narcissistically vulnerable individual responds to actual (or anticipated) narcissistic injury either with shamefaced withdrawal or with narcissistic rage". Otto Kernberg also saw the difference between normal narcissism and "pathological narcissism...[as] withdrawal into "splendid isolation"" in the latter instance; while Herbert Rosenfeld was concerned with "states of withdrawal commonly seen in narcissistic patients in which death is idealised as superior to life", as well as with "the alternation of states of narcissistic withdrawal and ego disintegration".

=== Schizoid withdrawal ===
Closely related to narcissistic withdrawal is schizoid withdrawal, "the escape from too great pressure by abolishing emotional relationships altogether in favour of an introverted and withdrawn personality". These "fantastic refuges from need are forms of emotional starvation, megalomanias and distortions of reality born of fear" that maladaptively complicate an individual's capacity to enjoy a relationship.

== Sociology ==
"Narcissists will isolate themselves, leave their families, ignore others, do anything to preserve a special [...] sense of self". Arguably, however, all such "narcissistic withdrawal is haunted by its alter ego: the ghost of a full social presence" – with people living their lives "along a continuum which ranges from the maximal degree of social commitment [...] to a maximal degree of social withdrawal".

If "of all modes of narcissistic withdrawal, depression is the most crippling", a contributing factor may be that "depressed persons come to appreciate consciously how much social effort is in fact required in the normal course of keeping one's usual place in undertakings".

== Therapy ==
Object relations theory would see the process of therapy as one whereby the therapist enabled their patient to have "resituated the object from the purely schizoid usage to the shared schizoid usage (initially) until eventually [...] the object relation – discussing, arguing, idealizing, hating, etc. – emerged".

Fenichel considered that in patients where "their narcissistic regression is a reaction to narcissistic injuries; if they are shown this fact and given time to face the real injuries and to develop other types of reaction, they may be helped enormously" Neville Symington however estimated that "often a kind of war develops between analyst and patient, with the analyst trying to haul the patient out of the cocoon [...] his narcissistic envelope [...] and the patient pulling for all his worth in the other direction".

== Cultural analogues ==
- In Joanne Greenberg's novel I Never Promised You a Rose Garden, the therapist of the protagonist wonders "if there is a pattern.... You give up a secret to our view and then you get so scared that you run for cover into your panic or into your secret world. To live there."
- More generally, the 1920s have been described as a time of "changes in which women were channelled toward narcissistic withdrawal rather than developing strong egos".

== See also ==
- André Green
- Frieda Fromm-Reichmann
- Fugue state
- Michael Balint
- Narcissistic defences
- Paranoid personality disorder
- Psychic retreat
- Schizoid personality disorder
