= Narcissistic supply =

Psychology concept

In psychoanalytic theory, narcissistic supply is attention or admiration that is pathologically or excessively needed from codependents, or such a need in the orally fixated, that does not take into account the feelings, opinions or preferences of other people.

The concept was introduced by Otto Fenichel in 1938, to describe a type of admiration, interpersonal support or sustenance drawn by an individual from their environment and essential to their self-esteem.

== History ==
Building on Freud's concept of narcissistic satisfaction and on the work of his colleague the psychoanalyst Karl Abraham, Fenichel highlighted the narcissistic need in early development for supplies to enable young children to maintain a sense of mental equilibrium. He identified two main strategies for obtaining such narcissistic supplies—aggression and ingratiation—contrasting styles of approach which could later develop into the sadistic and the submissive respectively.

A childhood loss of essential supplies was for Fenichel key to a depressive disposition, as well as to a tendency to seek compensatory narcissistic supplies thereafter. Impulse neuroses, addictions including love addiction and gambling, were all seen by him as products of the struggle for supplies in later life. Psychoanalyst Ernst Simmel (1920) had earlier considered neurotic gambling as an attempt to regain primitive love and attention in an adult context.

== Personality disorders ==
Psychoanalyst Otto Kernberg considered the malignant narcissistic criminal to be coldly characterised by a disregard of others unless they could be idealised as sources of narcissistic supply. Self psychologist Heinz Kohut saw those with narcissistic personality disorder as disintegrating mentally when cut off from a regular source of narcissistic supply. Those providing supply to such figures may be treated as if they are a part of the narcissist, in an eclipse of all personal boundaries.

Intimate partners and close associates are often described as primary sources of narcissistic supply, particularly in discussions of narcissistic personality disorder.

== See also ==
- Flattery
- Narcissistic mortification
- Narcissistic injury
- Narcissistic withdrawal
