= Hermann Nunberg =

Polish psychoanalyst and neurologist (1884–1970)

Hermann "Herman" Nunberg (Polish: [ˈnunbɛrk]; 23 January 1884 – 20 May 1970) was a Polish-born American psychoanalyst and neurologist.

== Life ==
Nunberg was born in 1884 in Będzin which was then part of Congress Poland. He earned his medical degree in 1910 from the University of Zurich, where he assisted Carl Gustav Jung at the Burghölzli Psychiatric Clinic with word association tests. For a short time he practised psychiatry in Schaffhausen and Bern, and in 1912 he taught classes at the university clinic in Kraków. In 1914 he became an assistant to Julius Wagner-Jauregg in Vienna, where for several years he taught classes on neurology, and where in 1915 he joined the Vienna Psychoanalytic Society.

He remained in Vienna until 1932 when he emigrated to the United States and worked in Philadelphia and New York City. While in New York he was a member of the New York Psychoanalytic Society, of which he was president from 1950 until 1952.

Nunberg died in New York City at the age of 86.

== Writings and work ==
In 1932, copies of his lectures were published (translated in 1955 as a book titled "Principles of Psychoanalysis, Their Application to the Neuroses"); and in the preface of the 1932 publication, an impressed Sigmund Freud wrote that it:

"contains the most complete and conscientious presentation of a psycho-analytic theory of the neurotic processes which we at present possess".

Nunberg was an early advocate (1918) of required "training analysis" sessions for psychoanalysts in training. He also spoke up strongly in favor of lay analysis, suggesting that behind opposition to it stood non-theoretical motives “such as medical prestige and motives of an economic nature”.

Ernest Jones noted Nunberg as one of the few proponents for Freud’s Death drive. Jacques Lacan however considered that Nunberg revealed something of his own grandiosity in his meditations upon the relations between the life and the death forces.

Nunberg's articles on ‘The Will to Recovery’ (1926) and ‘On the Theory of Therapeutic Results of Psychoanalysis’ (1937) reveal his interest in the curative aspects of analysis. Lacan singled out the former piece as showing (in humorous fashion) the inherent ambiguities in the neurotic’s search for cure: “to restore peace in his home...the patient admits to a desire, in the form of a temporary suspension of his presence at home, the opposite of what he came to propose as the first aim of his analysis”.

== Bibliography ==
- Waldhorn, Herbert F. (April 1963). The Minutes of the Vienna Psychoanalytic Society. Volume I, 1906-1908. Edited by Herman Nunberg and Ernst Fedem. New York: International Universities Press, Inc., 1962. 410 pp. pp. 249–282.
- Nunberg, Herman (1961). Curiosity. International Universities Press.

== See also ==
- Apprentice complex
- Depersonalization
- Franz Alexander

== Sources ==
- Boigon, Melvin (1957). "Principles of Psychoanalysis. Herman Nunberg. 383 pp. International Universities Press, New York. 1956. $7.50". American Journal of Psychoanalysis. 17 (2): 182–183.
- Clover, Edward (1956). "Principles of Psychoanalysis. Their Application to the Neuroses. By Herman Nunberg, M.D. Foreword by Sigmund Freud. Trans, by Madlyn Kahr and Sidney Kahr, M.D. New York: International Universities Press, Inc., 1956. 382 pp". The Psychoanalytic Quarterly. 25 (4): 586–610. doi:10.1080/21674086.1956.11926039.
