= O. Spurgeon English =

American psychiatrist and psychoanalyst

- Born: Oliver Spurgeon English; September 27, 1901; Presque Isle, Maine
- Died: October 3, 1993 (aged 92); Philadelphia, Pennsylvania
- Education: Jefferson Medical College
- Known for: Psychosomatic medicine
- Scientific career
- Fields: Psychiatry; Psychotherapy
- Institutions: Temple University

Oliver Spurgeon English (September 27, 1901 – October 3, 1993) was an American psychiatrist and psychoanalyst who taught at Temple University. He was also a founding member of the Philadelphia Psychoanalytic Society in 1937, in addition to working at both the Philadelphia General Hospital and Temple University Hospital. With Edward Weiss, he co-authored an influential textbook on psychosomatic medicine in 1943, among the first books on the topic. His work in this area led the Associated Press to describe him as "one of the first psychotherapists to write about the connections between mental and physical health". His numerous other interested included the roles of fathers in child rearing, about which he authored the 1951 book Fathers Are Parents, Too.
