= Gustav Bychowski =

Polish psychoanalyst (1895–1972)

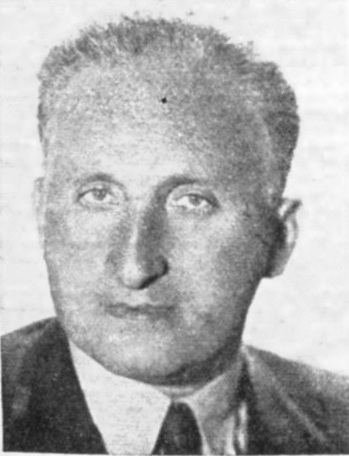
Gustaw Bychowski

Gustav Bychowski (in Polish, Gustaw Bychowski, born 1895 in Warsaw, Congress Poland, died April 3, 1972, in Fez, Morocco) was a Polish-American psychiatrist, psychoanalyst and author. he was the son of the distinguished neurologist Shneor Zalman Bychowski (1865-1934). He studied for a medical degree at the University of Zurich and studied psychiatry at Burghölzli, the University of Zurich's psychiatric hospital. He then studied psychoanalysis under Sigmund Freud in Vienna before moving back to Warsaw in 1921 and translating Freud's Introduction to Psychoanalysis into Polish.

During his career, he wrote a large number of books on psychoanalysis including Evil in Man: The Anatomy of Hate and Violence and Dictators and Disciples from Caesar to Stalin. The latter looks specifically at Julius Caesar, Oliver Cromwell, Maximilien Robespierre, Adolf Hitler and Joseph Stalin.

The psychoanalyst Frank M. Lachmann describes Bychowski as not being a traditional Freudian: "Here was a Freudian analyst who was clearly more interested in connecting with the patient and finding areas of strength than in demonstrating how clever he could be in eliciting psychopathology". Lachmann writes that Bychowski eventually adopted similar views to that of Heinz Kohut.

Amongst his patients was noted American filmmaker James Toback.

== Selected bibliography ==
- Specialized Techniques in Psychotherapy (ed. with J. Louise Despert), New York: Basic Books, 1952.
- Zur Psychopathologie der Brandstiftung. Zurich: O. Fussli, 1919
- Zur Psychopathologie der Brandstiftung. Schweizer Archiv für Neurologie und Psychiatrie 5, p. 29–55, 1919
- Űber das Fehlen der Wahmehmung der eigenen Blindheit bei zwei Kriegsverletzten. Neurologisches Centralblatt 39, p. 354–357, 1920
- Wissenschaft und Anthroposophie. Bemerkungen zum Aufsatz von Glaus ueber die anthroposophischen Kurse in Dornach. Schweizerische medizinische Wochenschrift 16, p. 377–378, 1921
- Autismus und Regression in modernen Kunstbestrebungen. Allgemeine Zeitschrift für Psychiatrie und psychisch-gerichtliche Medicin 78, s. 102–121, 1922
- Eine Gesichtsillusion als Ausdruck der ambivalenten Ubertragung. Int. Zsch. Psychoanal. 8, p. 337–339, 1922
- G. Bychowski, E. Sternschein (1923). "Zur Kenntnis der Beziehungen zwischen den corticalen Ausfallserscheinungen und dem Allgemeinzustand des Gehirns". Zeitschrift für die gesamte Neurologie und Psychiatrie. 85 (85, 1): 68–77. doi:10.1007/BF02869620. S2CID 178854750.
- Gustav Bychowski (1925). "Zur Wirkung großer Cocaingaben auf Schizophrene". Monatsschrift für Psychiatrie und Neurologie. 58 (58, 6): 329–344. doi:10.1159/000166385.
- Zur Frage nach den Beziehungen zwischen der Psyche und dem weiblichen Genitalsystem. Monatsschrift für Psychiatrie und Neurologie 59, p. 209–214, 1925
- Schizofrenja w świetle psychoanalizy. Rocznik Psychjatryczny 5, p. 49–78, 1927
- W sprawie psychoterapji schizofrenji. Rocznik Psychjatryczny 8, p. 57–69, 1928
- Űber Psychotherapie der Schizophrenie. Der Nervenarzt 1(8), p. 478–487, 1928
- Słowacki i jego dusza. Studium psychoanalityczne. Warszawa-Kraków: Wydawnictwo J. Mortkowicza, 1930
- O wychowaniu seksualnem. Warszawa: Polskie Towarzystwo Eugeniczne, 1930
- Marcel Proust als Dichter der psychologischen Analyse. Psychoanal. Bewegung 4, s. 323–344, 1932
- O pewnych zagadnieniach schizofrenji w świetle patologji mózgowej. Rocznik Psychjatryczny 21, p. 28–44, 1933
- Psychoanaliza na usługach wychowania dzieci moralnie zaniedbanych. Szkoła Specjalna 11 (2/4), 1934/1935
- Przestępca w świetle psychoanalizy. Rocznik Psychjatryczny 24, p. 30–52, 1935
- Certain Problems of Schizophrenia in the Light of Cerebral Pathology. Journal of Nervous and Mental Disease 81 (3), p. 280–298, 1935
- O legastenji, 1935
- Zasady analizy psychiatrycznej zaburzeń ogniskowych. Rocznik Psychjatryczny 25, 110–134, 1936
- Rozmowa z Freudem. Wiadomości Literackie 20 (652), p. 4, 10.4.1936
- Bychowski G., Kaczyński M., Konopka C., Szczytt K. Doświadczenia i dotychczasowe wyniki leczenia insuliną chorób psychicznych. Rocznik Psychiatryczny 28, s. 105–135, 1936
- Frontalsyndrome und Parietookzipitalsyndrome. Jahrbücher für Psychiatrie und Neurologie 54, p. 283–311, 1937
- O diencefalozach. Warszawskie Czasopismo Lekarskie 15 (5, 6), 1938
- Physiology of schizophrenic thinking. Journal of Nervous and Mental Disease 98, p. 368–386, 1942
- The spiritual background of Hitlerism. Journal of Criminal Psychopathology 4, p. 579–598, 1942
- Disorders In The Body-image In The Clinical Pictures Of Psychoses. Journal of Nervous and Mental Disease 97(3), p. 310–335, 1943.
- Some aspects of shock therapy: the structure of psychosis. Journal of Nervous and Mental Disease 102, p. 338–356, 1945
- Dictators and Disciples from Caesar to Stalin; A Psychoanalytic Interpretation of History. New York: International Universities Press, 1948
- On neurotic obesity. Psychoanalytic Review 37, p. 301–319, 1950
- Psychotherapy of Psychosis. New York: Grune and Stratton, 1952
- Specialized Techniques in Psychotherapy. New York: Basic Books, 1952
- Obsessive compulsive façade in schizophrenia. International Journal of Psychoanalysis 47, p. 189–197, 1966
- Evil in Man: The Anatomy of Hate and Violence. New York: Grune and Stratton, 1968
