= Edmund Bergler =

Austrian-born American psychoanalyst

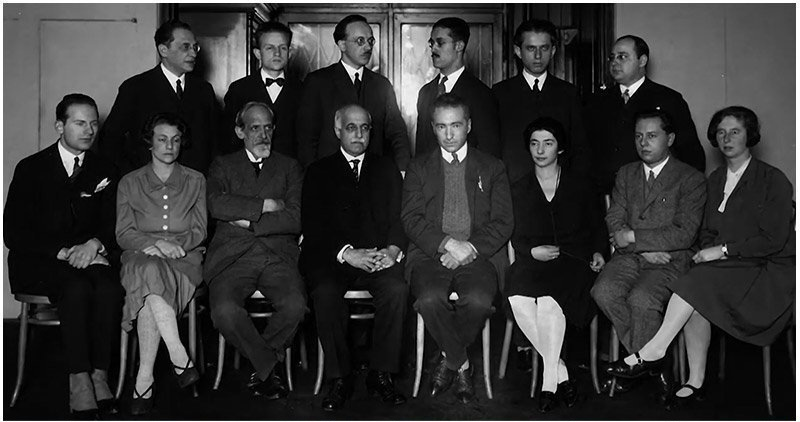
- Edmund Bergler in the Wiener Psychoanalytisches Ambulatorium (standing at far right)
- Born: July 20, 1899; Kolomea, Austria-Hungary
- Died: February 6, 1962 (aged 62); New York City, U.S.
- Occupation: Psychoanalyst

Edmund Bergler (/ˈbɛərɡlər/ BAIR-glər; Austrian German: [ˈɛdmʊnd ˈbɛrɡlɐ]; July 20, 1899 – February 6, 1962) was an Austrian-born American psychoanalyst whose books covered such topics as childhood development, mid-life crises, loveless marriages, gambling, self-defeating behaviors, and homosexuality. He has been described as the most important psychoanalytic theorist of homosexuality in the 1950s.

== Biography ==
Edmund Bergler was born in Kolomyia, in today's Ukraine, in 1899 into a Jewish family. Bergler fled Nazi Austria in 1937–38 and settled in New York City, where he worked as a psychoanalyst. Bergler wrote 25 psychology books along with 273 articles that were published in leading professional journals. He also had unfinished manuscripts of dozens of more titles in the possession of the Edmund and Marianne Bergler Psychiatric Foundation. He has been referred to as "one of the few original minds among the followers of Freud". Delos Smith, science editor of United Press International, said Bergler was "among the most prolific Freudian theoreticians after Freud himself".

== Work ==
Summarizing his work, Bergler said that people were heavily defended against realization of the darkest aspects of human nature, meaning the individual's emotional addiction to unresolved negative emotions. He wrote in 1958, "I can only reiterate my opinion that the superego is the real master of the personality, that psychic masochism constitutes the most dangerous countermeasure of the unconscious ego against the superego's tyranny, that psychic masochism is 'the life-blood of neurosis' and is in fact the basic neurosis. I still subscribe to my dictum, 'Man's inhumanity to man is equaled only by man's inhumanity to himself.'"

=== Sexuality ===
Bergler was the most important psychoanalytic theorist of homosexuality in the 1950s. According to Kenneth Lewes, "...Bergler frequently distanced himself from the central, psychoanalytical tradition, while at the same time claiming a position of importance within it. He thought of himself as a revolutionary who would transform the movement." Near the end of his life, Bergler became an embarrassment to many other analysts: "His views at conferences and symposia were reported without remark, or they were softened and their offensive edge blunted."

Bergler was highly critical of sex researcher Alfred C. Kinsey, and rejected the Kinsey scale, deeming it to be based on flawed assumptions. In an article published in the peer-reviewed medical journal Psychiatric Quarterly, Bergler criticized Kinsey, saying, "Statistically speaking, Kinsey avoids with 100 percent completeness even the smallest concession to the existence of the dynamic unconscious. According to the "taxonomic approach," to which Kinsey adheres, the "human animal," as Kinsey calls homo sapiens, seems not yet to have developed the unconscious part of his personality... Derogatory remarks about Freudian psychoanalysis are mainly based on ignorance or resistance, or both. When this pair of characteristics occurs in biased laymen, one explains it away as typical resistance to acceptance of unconscious facts. The reason for this attitude in biased scientists is, of course, identical, though less defensible."

Bergler also states that: "Psychoanalytically, we know today that a complicated inner defense is involved. Homosexuals approve of their perversion because such acceptance of it - corresponding to a defense mechanism - enables them to hide unconsciously their deepest conflict, oral-masochistic regression. Since the homosexual who has not been treated has no inkling of the real state of affairs, he clings "proudly" to his defense mechanism. Only in cases in which a portion of inner guilt is not satiated by the real difficulties (hiding, social ostracism, extortion) which every homosexual experiences does the problem of changing come up."

He is noted for his insistence on the universality of unconscious masochism. He is remembered for his theories about both homosexuality and writer's block – a term he coined in 1947. Bergler, who did more work on the subject than any other psychoanalyst, argued that all gamblers gamble because of "psychic masochism".

=== Homosexuality: Disease or Way of Life? ===
Homosexuality: Disease or Way of Life? is a 1956 book by Bergler, in which he argues that homosexuality is a curable illness. Bergler denies that homosexuality is caused by hormonal or other biological factors, the Oedipus complex, or having a dominant mother and a weak or absent father, instead attributing both male and female homosexuality to pre-Oedipal factors involving an unsolved masochistic conflict with the mother during the earliest period of infancy. According to Bergler, homosexuality in men reflects unconscious fear and hatred of women. Bergler argues that there are several different types of homosexuality, each with a distinct clinical profile. Bergler rejects the existence of bisexuality, maintaining that all supposed bisexuals are homosexuals, and criticizes the work of sex researcher Alfred Kinsey. He characterizes homosexual men as sexually promiscuous, and argues that this promiscuity is a result of their unsatisfying sex lives and masochistic craving for danger. Bergler argues against immediately repealing laws against homosexuality, though he suggests that such laws could perhaps be repealed in the future if other measures against homosexuality proved effective. Bergler proposes the publicizing of his ideas as a measure against homosexuality.

== Legacy ==
Novelist Louis Auchincloss named his book The Injustice Collectors (1950) after Bergler's description of the unconscious masochist of that type.

Bergler's Homosexuality: Disease or Way of Life? (1956) was cited in Irving Bieber et al.'s Homosexuality: A Psychoanalytic Study of Male Homosexuals (1962). Bieber et al. mention Bergler briefly, noting that like Melanie Klein, he regarded the oral phase as the most determining factor in the development of homosexuality.

The philosopher Gilles Deleuze cited Bergler's The Basic Neurosis (1949) in his Masochism: Coldness and Cruelty (1967), writing that, "Bergler's general thesis is entirely sound: the specific element of masochism is the oral mother, the ideal of coldness, solicitude and death, between the uterine mother and the Oedipal mother."

Arnold M. Cooper, former professor of psychiatry at Cornell University Medical College and a past president of the American Psychoanalytic Association, said of Bergler's work: "I have adapted my model for understanding masochism from the work of Bergler, who regarded masochism as the basic neurosis from which all other neurotic behaviors derive. As long ago as 1949 . . . he felt, and I agree, [that the mechanism of orality] is paradigmatic for the masochistic character.

Freud critic Max Scharnberg has given Bergler's writings as an example of what he sees as the transparent absurdity of much psychoanalytic work in his The Non-Authentic Nature of Freud's Observations (1993), writing that few present-day psychoanalysts would defend Bergler. Scharnberg disapprovingly notes Bergler's claim that all homosexuals "are subservient when confronted with a stronger person, merciless when in power, unscrupulous about trampling on a weaker person."

Bergler's theories, with their assumption that the preservation of infantile megalomania or infantile omnipotence is of prime importance in the reduction of anxiety, have been seen as anticipating Heinz Kohut's self psychology.

Psychotherapist Mike Bundrant has based much of his work on Bergler's early theory of psychic masochism, although Bundrant has distanced himself from Bergler's views on homosexuality, claiming Bergler was victim to his own prejudice in this area, or simply mistaken. Bundrant discusses inner masochism in the form of "psychological attachments" that fit consistent patterns over time.

== Bibliography ==
- Bergler, Edmund. (1934). Frigidity in Women, with Edward Hitschmann (in German). New York (English version): Nervous and Mental Disease Monographs
- Bergler, Edmund. (1935). Talleyrand-Napoleon-Stendhal-Grabbe (in German). Vienna: Internationale Psychoanalytische Verlag
- Bergler, Edmund. (1937). Psychic Impotence in Men (in German). Berne: Hans Huber Verlag
- Bergler, Edmund. (1946). Unhappy Marriage and Divorce, with an Introduction by A. A. Brill. New York: International Universities Press
- Bergler, Edmund. (1948). The Battle of the Conscience. Washington, D.C.: Washington Institute of Medicine
- Bergler, Edmund. (1948). Divorce Won't Help. New York: Harper & Brothers
- Bergler, Edmund. (1949). Conflict in Marriage. New York: Harper & Brothers
- Bergler, Edmund. (1949). The Basic Neurosis. New York: Harper and Brothers
- Bergler, Edmund. (1949). The Writer and Psychoanalysis. Garden City: Doubleday and Co.
- Bergler, Edmund. (1951). Money and Emotional Conflicts. Doubleday and Co.
- Bergler, Edmund. (1951). Neurotic Counterfeit-Sex. New York: Grune & Stratton
- Bergler, Edmund. (1952). The Superego. New York: Grune & Stratton
- Bergler, Edmund. (1953). Fashion and the Unconscious. New York: Robert Brunner
- Bergler, Edmund, & Kroger, W. (1954). Kinsey's Myth of Female Sexuality: The Medical Facts. New York: Grune and Stratton
- Bergler, Edmund. (1954). The Revolt of the Middle-Aged Man. New York: A.A. Wyn
- Bergler, Edmund. (1956). Homosexuality: Disease or Way of Life. New York: Hill and Wang
- Bergler, Edmund. (1956). Laughter and the Sense of Humor. New York: Intercontinental Medical Book Corp.
- Bergler, Edmund. (1957). Psychology of Gambling. New York: Hill & Wang
- Bergler, Edmund. (1958). Counterfeit-Sex: Homosexuality, Impotence and Frigidity. New York: Grune and Stratton
- Bergler, Edmund. (1959). Principles of Self-Damage. New York: The Philosophical Library
- Bergler, Edmund. (1959). One Thousand Homosexuals: Conspiracy of Silence, or Curing and Deglamorizing Homosexuals? Paterson, New Jersey: Pageant Books
- Bergler, Edmund. (1960). Tensions Can be Reduced to Nuisances. New York: Collier Books
- Bergler, Edmund. (1961). Curable and Incurable Neurotics. New York: Liveright Pub. Co.
- Bergler, Edmund. (1963). Justice and Injustice, with J.A.M. Meerloo. New York: Grune and Stratton
- Bergler, Edmund. (1964). Parents Not Guilty. New York: Liveright Pub. Co.
- Bergler, Edmund. (1969). Selected Papers: 1933–1961. New York: Grune and Stratton
- Bergler, Edmund. (1998). The Talent for Stupidity: The Psychology of the Bungler, the Incompetent, and the Ineffectual. Madison, CT: International Universities Press
