= Forget about it =

- Forget about it (catchphrase) associated with the American mafia
- Forget About It, eighth studio album by Alison Krauss
- Forget About It (film), 2006 film

== See also ==
- Forget it (disambiguation)
- Fugget About It, 2012 adult animated TV sitcom
- Fuhgeddaboudit (disambiguation)
- "Let's Forget About It", song by Lisa Loeb from her 1997 album Firecracker
