= Gumba =

Gumba may refer to:

- Agumba people, an ethnic group who inhabited the plains of what is now central Kenya, but are now either extinct or assimilated
- Gumba, Nepal, a village in Sindhupalchok District in the Bagmati Zone of central Nepal
- Adamu Gumba (born 1948), Nigerian politician
- Razhden Gumba (1926—2007), Abkhazian composer and conductor
- Gumba or gumbe, a Caribbean drum
- Gumba or Goombah, a slang term referring to people of Italian descent, mainly in the United States

== See also ==
- Goomba (disambiguation)
- gompa, a Tibetan Buddhist building
- gumbo, a soup
- Gumbah, a populated place in the Gumbax District, Bari, Somalia
