= Goomba (disambiguation) =

Goomba, Goombah, or Gumbah may refer to:

- Goombah, a slang term referring to people of Italian descent, mainly in the United States
- Goomba, a species from the Super Mario video game series
- Gumbah, a populated place in the Gumbax District, Bari, Somalia
- Goombah or gumbe, a Caribbean drum

== See also ==
- Gumba (disambiguation)
- Gomba
