= Cape Guardafui =

Cape Guardafui: Raas Caseyr (Somali); راس عسير (Arabic)
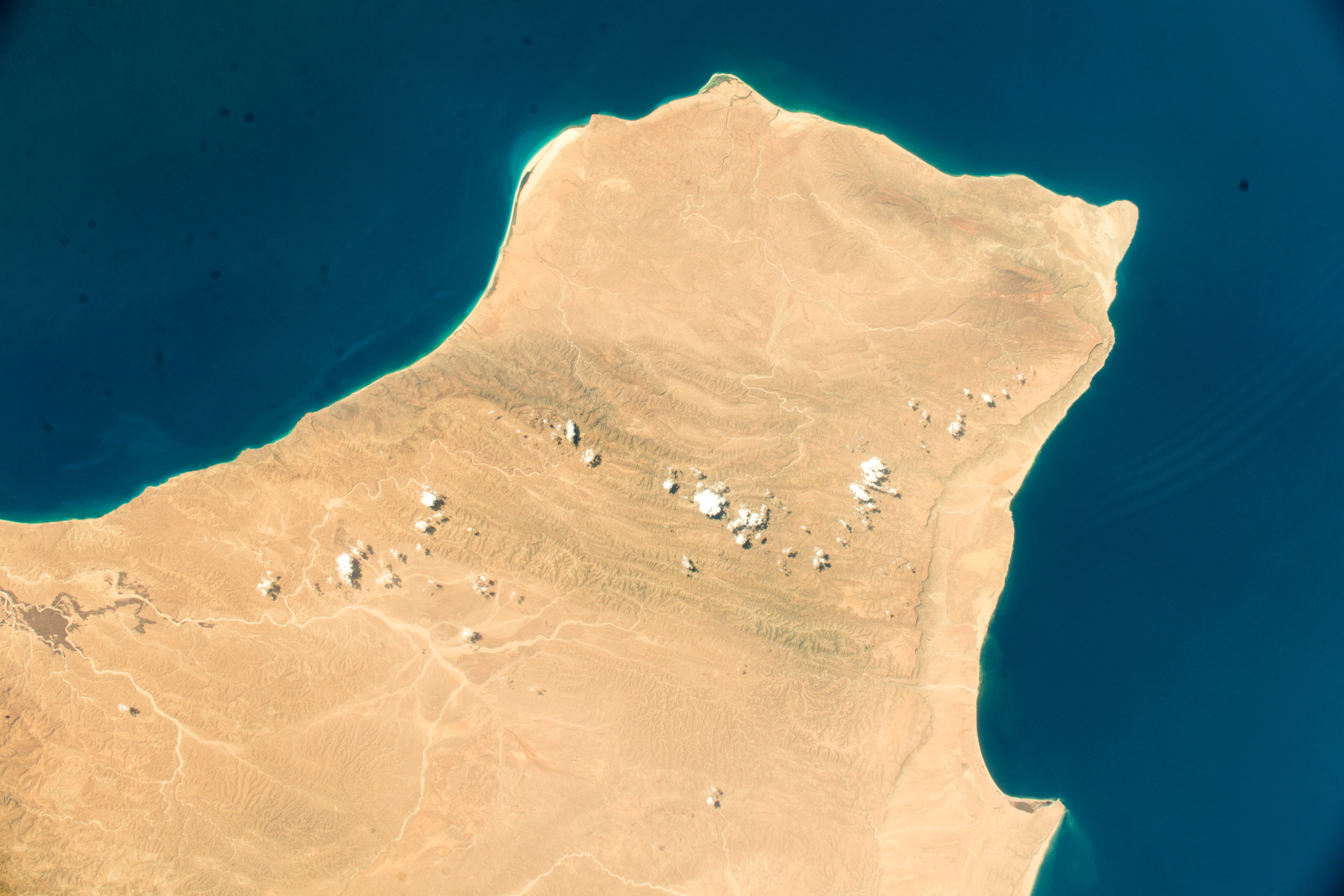
- Cape Guardafui as seen from the ISS

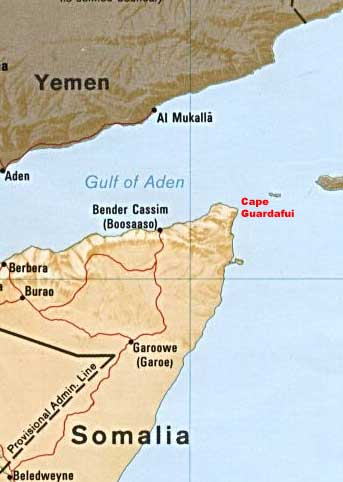
- Cape Guardafui location
- Coordinates: 11°50′N 51°17′E
- Country: Somalia
- Regional State: Puntland
- Region: Bari
- District: Alula
- Time zone: UTC+3 (EAT)

Cape Guardafui (Somali: Raas Caseyr, Arabic: راس عسير) is a headland in Somalia, in the federal state of Puntland. It forms the geographical apex of the Horn of Africa. Its shore at 51°27'52"E is the second easternmost point on mainland Africa after Ras Hafun. It is named after the offshore oceanic strait of the Guardafui Channel.

== Location ==
Cape Guardafui is located at 11°49′N 51°15′E, next to the Guardafui Channel. The archipelago of Socotra lies off the cape in the north of the Somali Sea.

Fifteen leagues (45 miles) west of Guardafui is Ras Filuk, a steep cliff jutting into the Gulf of Aden from flatland. The mountain is believed to correspond with the ancient Elephas Mons or Cape Elephant (Ras Filuk in Arabic) described by Strabo.

== History ==
Referred to as Aromata promontorium (Greek: Αρώματον ἄκρον) by the ancient Greeks, Guardafui was described as early as the 1st century CE in the Periplus of the Erythraean Sea, along with other flourishing commercial settlements on the northern Somali littoral.

The name Guardafui originated during the late Middle Ages by sailors using the Mediterranean Lingua Franca: "guarda fui" in ancient Italian means "look and escape", as a reference to the danger of the cape. Another theory traces the name to a nearby promontory once known as Jard-Hafun, pronounced as Gard-Hafun. The town of Hafun still carries this name.

During the early 19th century, Somali seamen prevented entry to their ports along the coast, while engaging in trade with Aden and Mokha in adjacent Yemen using their own vessels.

Due to the frequency of shipwrecks in the treacherous seas near Cape Guardafui, the British made an agreement with sultan Osman Mahamuud of the Majeerteen Sultanate, which controlled much of the northeastern Somali seaboard during the 19th century. The agreement stipulated that the British would pay annual subsidies to protect shipwrecked British crews and guard wrecks against plunder. The agreement, however, remained unratified, as the British feared that doing so would "give other powers a precedent for making agreements with the Somalis, who seemed ready to enter into relations with all comers".

Sultan Yusuf Ali Kenadid of the Sultanate of Hobyo, which also controlled a portion of the coast, later granted concessions to an Aden-based French hotel proprietor and a former French Army officer to construct a lighthouse in Cape Guardafui. Capital for the project was raised by a company in Marseille, but the deal subsequently failed.

=== Lighthouse "Francesco Crispi" ===
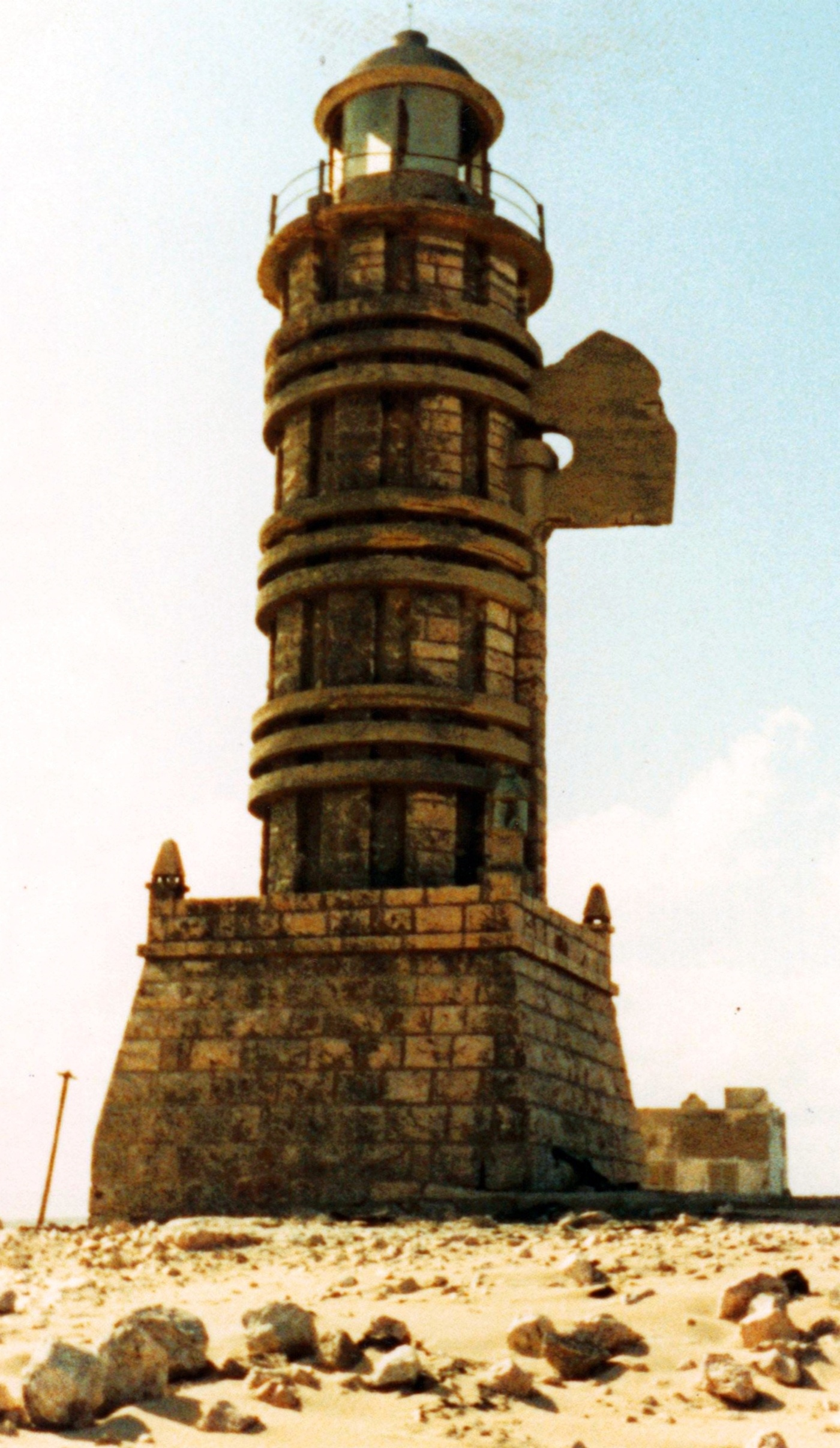
The lighthouse

Britain ceded to Italy sovereignty of the disputed region where Cape Guardafui is located in 1894. Starting in 1899, the Italians performed detailed studies and surveys to build a lighthouse and the first real project was proposed in 1904. Italy wanted the construction and maintenance costs of the future lighthouse to be shared by the maritime powers which would benefit most from the new lighthouse but Britain, which suspected that Italy also intended to build a coaling station that would compete with Aden, finally refused to contribute.

Thus, it is only during the early 1920s that the authorities of Italian Somaliland finally made good on their promise to build a lighthouse. The first one, inaugurated in April 1924 as the Francesco Crispi Lighthouse, was a simple, functional metal-framed lighthouse built atop the headland. Simultaneously, a wireless station to monitor maritime traffic, which had been built in the nearby village of Tohen, was activated.

A large-scale rebellion against Italian rule in that part of Italian Somaliland was underway at the time and troops guarding the new lighthouse and the wireless station repelled two attacks by several hundred rebels in November 1925 and January 1926.

The lighthouse had suffered some damages during the attacks and this was one of the reasons that prompted the authorities to build a stronger, stone and reinforced concrete lighthouse, which was inaugurated in 1930. The striking new lighthouse was built in the shape of an Italian fascist "Fascio littorio". The lighthouse, which is no longer in use, still has the huge stone axe blade characteristic of fascist symbolism.

A stone lighthouse and radio station were eventually built in the headland, with the former named after Francesco Crispi in 1930.

The lighthouse has an original "Fascio littorio" exterior stone as a decoration, that is typical of fascist architecture promoted by Benito Mussolini. Italian authorities have requested a study to declare the lighthouse an "historical monument" of Somalia and a proposed World Heritage Site.

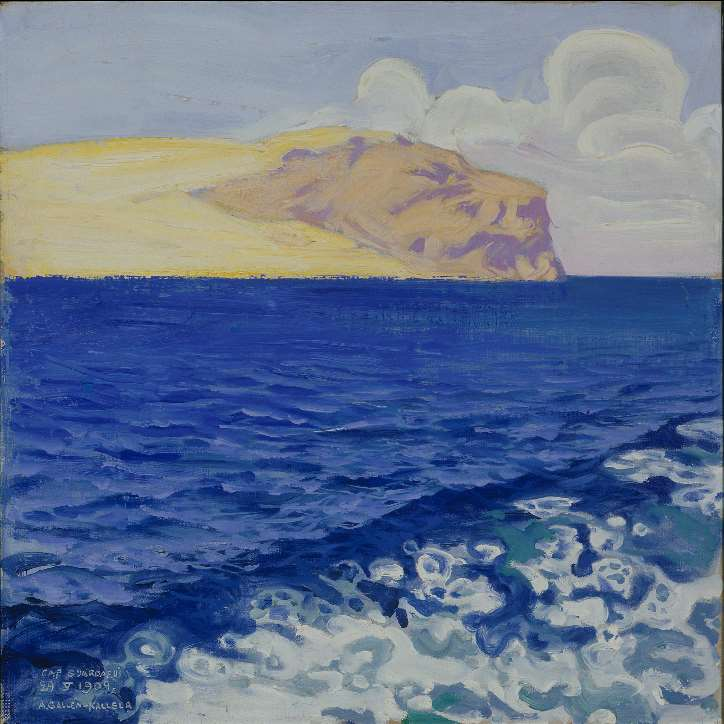
Cape Guardafui as painted by Finnish artist Akseli Gallen-Kallela in 1909 on his ship voyage to British East Africa.

== Demography ==
Ras Asir represents the tip of the African continent. Many nomads that traverse here are also fisherman due to the abundance of fish off its shores. With the usage of binoculars, the vessels that traverse the Guardafui Channel can sometimes be seen.

== Geography ==
Six miles south of Ras Asir there are some mimosa trees with water streams known as Wadi Tuhom. The offshore Guardafui Channel connects the Gulf of Aden with the Somali Sea. A sighting of Ras Asir represents a milestone for passing vessels, due to a sharp westerly change in direction and a changing contrast between the hazardous currents to Ras Asir's east, and the comparatively calm seas to its north, especially during the south-west monsoon. On April 8, 2013, the Puntland government announced the creation of a new region coextensive with Cape Guardafui named Gardafuu. Carved out of the Bari region, it consists of four districts (Baargaal, Bereeda, Alula, and Gumbah) and has its capital at Alula. It has the longest coastline of Puntlands 9 regions (on both the Indian Ocean and Gulf of Aden).

== See also ==
- Maritime history of Somalia
- Geography of Somalia
