= Deutsches Stadion =

Unfinished monumental stadium

Coordinates: 49°25′19.91″N 11°6′50.91″E

- German Stadium
- Interactive map of Deutsches Stadion
- Location: Nuremberg, Nazi Germany
- Capacity: 405,000
- Surface: Grass

Construction
- Groundbreaking: September 1937
- Architect: Albert Speer

Tenant
- Nazi party rally grounds

The Deutsches Stadion ("German Stadium") was a monumental stadium designed by Albert Speer for the Nazi party rally grounds in Nuremberg, southern Germany. Its construction began in September 1937, and was scheduled for completion in 1943. Like most other Nazi monumental structures, however, its construction was interrupted by the outbreak of World War II and was never finished.

== Design ==
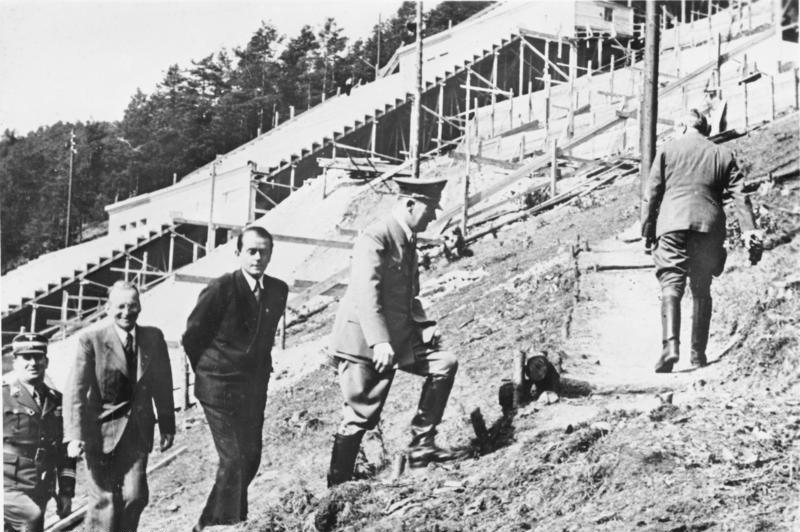
Adolf Hitler and Albert Speer visiting a test construction site near Nuremberg

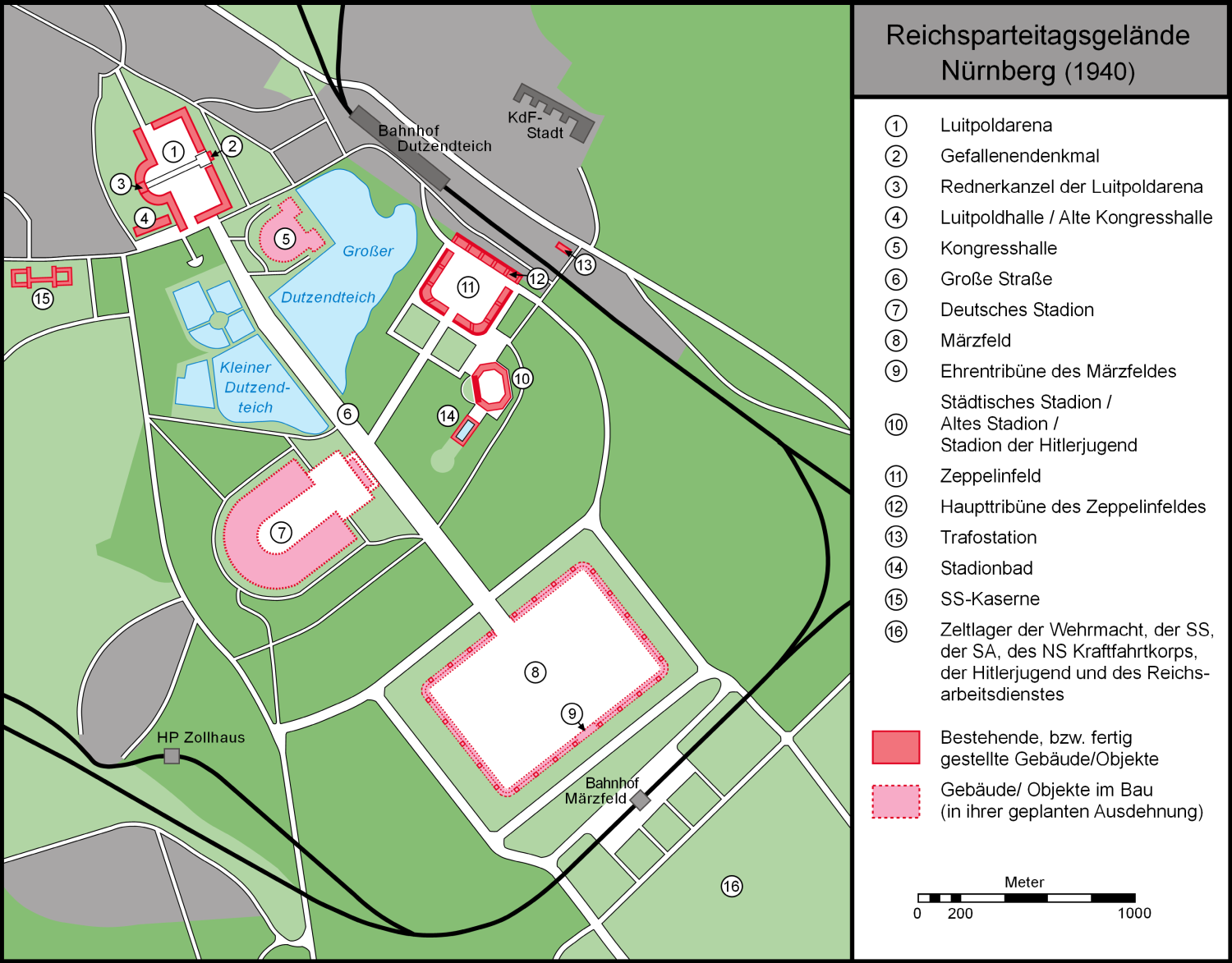
The party rally grounds in the year 1940, the Deutsches Stadion in the centre, left.

According to Speer himself, it was inspired not by the Circus Maximus in Rome but by the Panathenaic Stadium of Athens, which had impressed him greatly when he had visited it in 1935. Speer's stadium was a gigantic inflation of its Greco-Roman model, from which he borrowed the horseshoe configuration and the propylaeum, now transformed into a raised, pillared, temple-like structure (Säulenvorhof) attached to the open end of the stadium by an internally pillared courtyard. Since the stadium was not set like the Panathenaic Stadium structure at the bottom of a gully, but on a flat area of land (24 hectares), its five tiers of seats for 405,000 spectators had to be supported in the usual Roman manner by massive barrel vaults. The external façade of pink granite blocks, which would have risen to a height of about 90 metres, consisted of a series of arches 65 metres high resting on a podium of dark red granite. The arcade and podium again suggests a Roman, not a Greek, circus or stadium, which did not traditionally rest on a substructure. In order to deliver such a vast number of spectators to their seats quickly, express lifts were to be installed to take spectators 100 at a time to seats on the top three tiers. The short transverse axis of the stadium culminated at each of its ends in a raised Ehrentribüne (Tribune of Honour) for the Führer, special guests and the press. Once more, Roman practice provided the architectural precedent.

Speer apparently adopted a horseshoe shape for his building only after rejecting the oval shape of an amphitheatre. The latter plan, he claimed, would have intensified the heat and produced psychological discomfort, a comment he does not elucidate. When Speer remarked on the staggering cost of the building, Hitler, who laid its cornerstone on September 9, 1937, merely retorted that it would cost less than two battleships of the Bismarck class.

== Projected use ==
Wolfgang Lotz, writing about the stadium in 1937, commented that it would contain twice the number of spectators originally accommodated by the Circus Maximus. Inevitably for the period, he also emphasized the community feeling that such a building would engender between competitors and spectators:

As in ancient Greece, the elite and most experienced men chosen from the mass of the nation will compete against each other here. An entire nation in sympathetic wonder is seated on the tiers. Spectators and competitors merge in one unity.

The idea of staging Pan-Germanic athletic games here was perhaps suggested by the Panathenaic Games, but Speer's stadium was, despite his own statement, stylistically more Roman than Greek in inspiration and with its huge barrel-vaulted substructures and arcaded exterior façade, more like the Circus Maximus than the Panathenaic Stadium. Nazi building exhibits a mixture of Greek and Roman elements, with Roman predominating.

But Hitler did not want such a stadium to serve merely as a centre for German athletic sport. The restored Panathenaic Stadium had been used for the 1896 Summer Olympics and the 1906 Intercalated Games, held out of series. In 1936 these games were held in the Reichssportfeld in Berlin, but Hitler insisted that after 1940, when the games were to have been held in Tokyo, all future games were to be held in the Deutsches Stadion. This stadium was in all its dimensions far larger than the 1936 Olympic Stadium in Berlin, which held only 115,000 spectators. Hitler anticipated that after winning the war, the world would have no choice but to send its athletes to Germany every time the Olympic Games were held at which, no doubt, victors would have received their prizes from the Führer, surrounded by the party faithful on the pulvinar on the short axis of the cavernous stadium.

== The site after the war ==
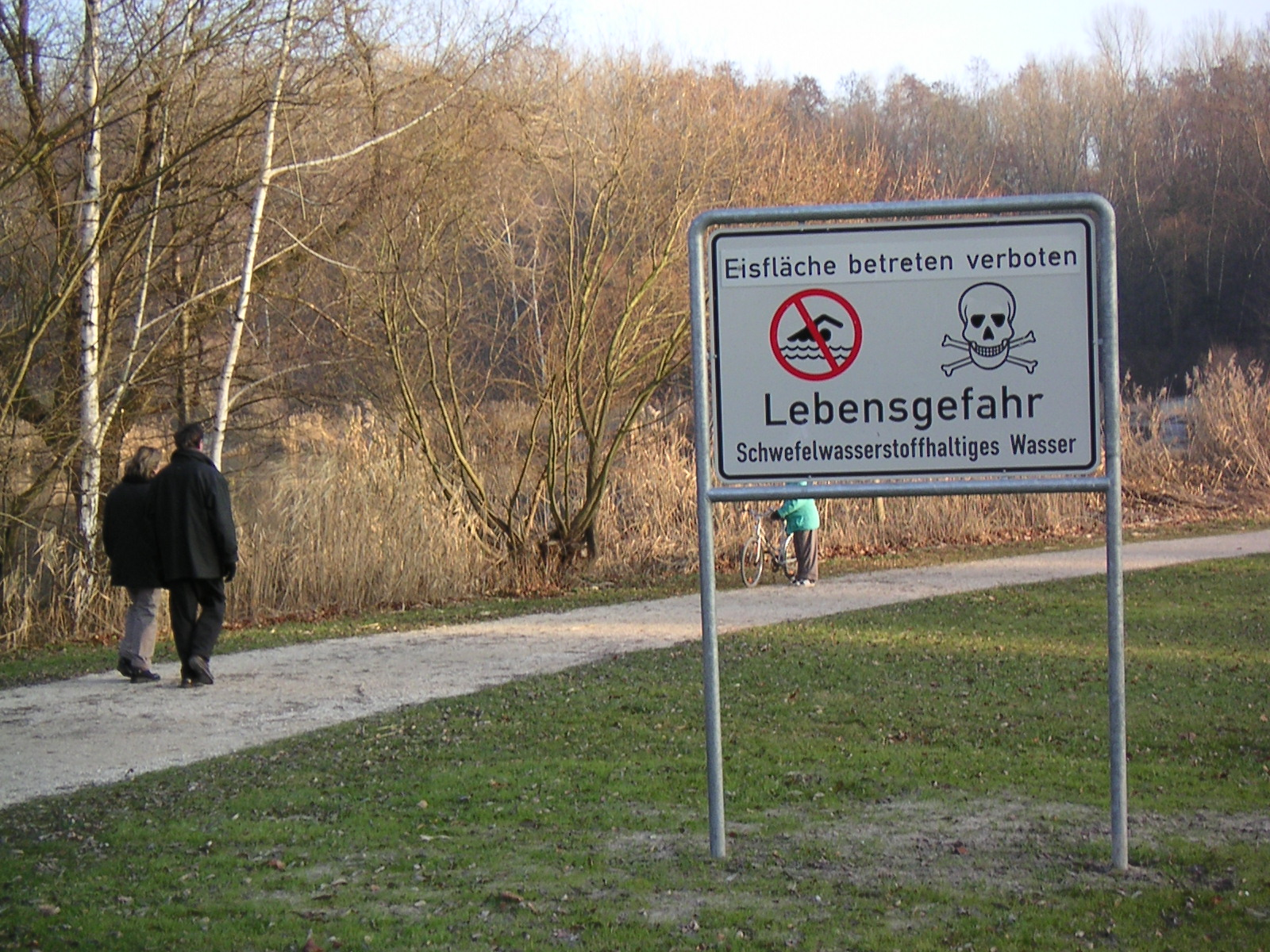
Warning sign at the Silbersee lake

After the war, the horseshoe-shaped foundation of the building quickly filled with groundwater and was named "Silbersee" (Silver lake) by locals. The site became a dump for debris of Nuremberg's destroyed buildings and any kind of other waste, including what today is considered hazardous waste. The southern part of the horseshoe was filled up to ground level with waste in 1951. After that a mountain of waste continued to grow until the dump was closed in 1962. The landfill, which contains 5.53 million m^{3} of waste, was covered with a layer of earth and trees were planted on it. The new mountain was named "Silberbuck".

Since the dump has no containment and is permeated by ground water, dangerous material is constantly leaking into the Silbersee. The lower layers of water in the lake contain extremely high amounts of hydrogen sulfide, which causes unconsciousness when breathed in. At least 50 people have already drowned in the lake.

== Prototype construction work ==
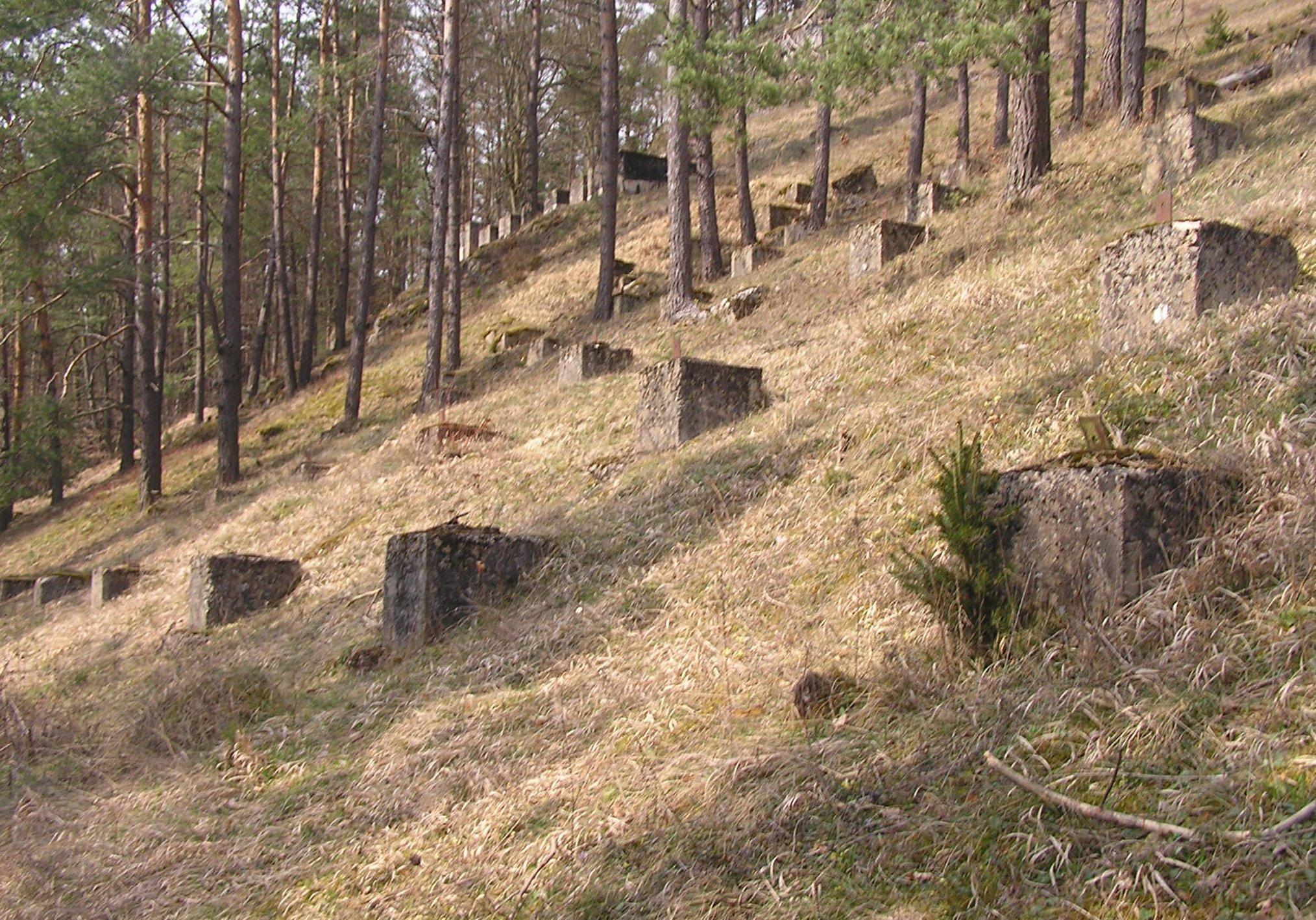
Remainders of the test construction site.

The small village of Achtel in Hirschbach, Bavaria is the site of a sports grandstand constructed as a prototype for part of the Deutsches Stadion. It was constructed mostly of wood, which was removed after the war and was used to reconstruct local buildings. Today only the concrete supports remain.

== See also ==
- Fascist architecture
- List of Nazi construction
- Nazi architecture
- Welthauptstadt Germania
