= Fuhgeddaboudit =

Fuhgeddaboudit, an eye dialect spelling of "forget about it," may refer to:

- Fuhgeddaboudit, a stereotypical phrase from New York City English, included in a list of Italian-American Mafia terminology
- Fuhgeddaboudit (Dark Angel episode)
- Fugget About It, a Canadian adult animated sitcom
