= Ras Filuk =

Ras Filuk Bolimoog رأس فيلوك
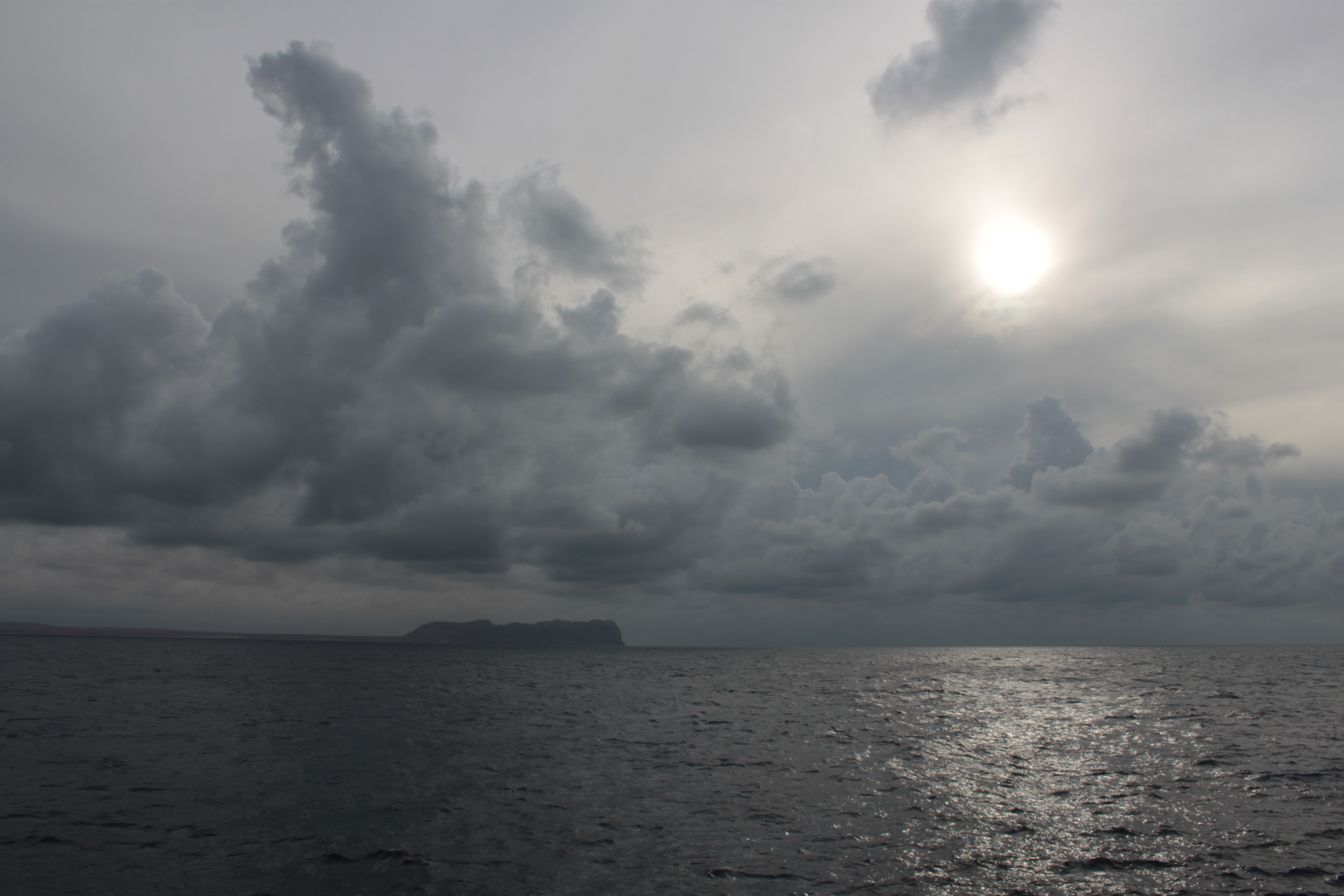
- Headland of Ras Filuk viewed from the sea
- Nickname: Cape Elephant
- Country: Somalia
- Region: Bari
- Time zone: UTC+3 (EAT)

Ras Filuk (Somali: Bolimoog, Arabic: رأس فيلوك), also known as Cape Elephant, is a headland in the northeastern Bari province of Somalia. It is situated in the autonomous Puntland region.

== Etymology ==
Ras Filuk (or Ras Fil) means the Head of the Elephant in Arabic. Alternatively it is known as Jebel Fil, which translates into Mount Elephant (Jebel meaning mountain in Arabic).

== Location ==
Ras Filuk is located at 11°56′27.2″N 50°37′52.56″E, next to the Guardafui Channel. It lies 39 nautical miles (45 miles) west of Cape Guardafui, 7 nautical miles (8 miles) west of Alula and 52 nautical miles (60 miles) east of Qandala.

== History ==
Ras Filuk has, on account of its steep cliffwalls jutting into the Gulf of Aden, been a prominent geographical feature for vessels passing the tip of the Horn of Africa. It is quite likely the Elephas Mons of antiquity.

On April 8, 2013, the Puntland government announced the creation of a new region coextensive with Ras Filuk and Cape Guardafui, named Gardafuul. Carved out of the Bari region, it consists of three districts and has its capital at Alula.

== See also ==
- Maritime history of Somalia
- Geography of Somalia
