= Forget it =

Forget it may refer to:

- "Forget It!", a 2001 Donald Duck comic by Don Rosa
- "Vergiß Es (Forget It)", 2004 Matthias Reim single with Bonnie Tyler on vocals
- "Forget It" (Barei song) 2017
- "Forget It", song by Rodriguez on his 1970 album Cold Fact
- "Forget It", track on the 2004 Breaking Benjamin album We Are Not Alone
- “Forget It”, a song by Suicideboys on their 2021 album Long Term Effects of Suffering

== See also ==
- Forget about it (disambiguation)
