= Mu-qed =

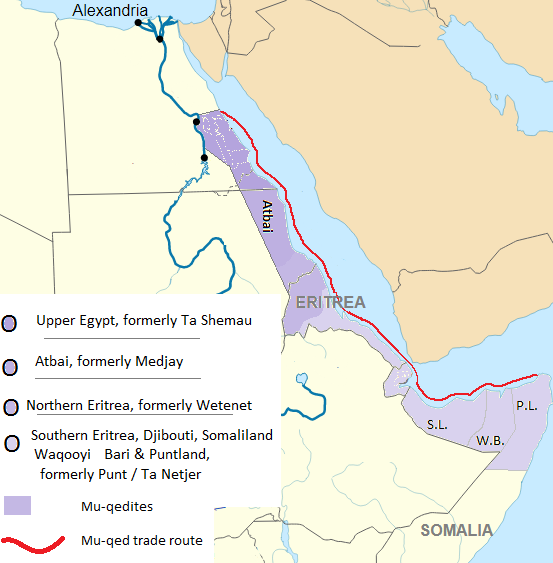
Mu-qedite inhabitations (in purple); Mu-qed trade route (in red).

Mu-Qed was an ancient maritime trade route along the littoral of the Red Sea's northeast African coast. The term Mu-Qed had been in use since the Eighteenth Dynasty of Egypt, and typically referred to the trade carried out between ancient Egyptians and Puntites. Mu-Qed in particular refers to the Red Sea starting from the waters off Qosair, the port serving the canal of Ro-henu (Wadi Hammamat).

== Etymology ==
The phrase Mu-Qed has both an ellipsis or shortened form and a longer unabridged form. The transliteration of the unabridged form is "Pa-ym-aa-n-mu-qed" which literally means "The Great Sea of Inverted Water", whilst its ellipsis or shortened form Mu-Qed literally translates as inverted water.

== Geography ==
=== Onshore ===
Onshore of the Mu-Qed route from southeast Egypt and eastern Sudan the desert is known is the Atbai. Atbai is an arid terrain that forms the easternmost extremity of the Sahara desert roughly to the south of the Ro-henu or Wadi Hammamat riverbed until Eritrea where it meets the Danakil desert. The Atbai is a hyper-arid plateau that lies between the Nubian desert and Red Sea, has Precambrian rock formations and is primarily inhabited by the Beja.

=== Muqedian Sea ===
During the first century AD, according to the Periplus of the Erythraean Sea, the extent of trading stations along the Muqedian Sea extended from Berenice Troglodytica near the modern Sudan-Egypt border southwards to what was formerly called Opone, and contemporarily called Hafun, which was the lattermost of the "far-side" ports. Spanning from the Suez Canal to the Guardafui Channel, the Muqedian Sea is a major intercontinental waterway that encompasses both the Red Sea and the Gulf of Aden. The Muqedian Sea constitutes one of the highest volume shipping lanes in the world and is a biodeiversity hotspot for coral ecosystems.

== Culture ==
=== Engagement ===
Although ancient Punt lay along the African coast of the Red Sea and Gulf of Aden, Van Sertima proposed that the primary intercultural correspondence ancient Egypt had occurred along the Nile Valley. This theory later adopted by some Afrocentrism or Pan-Africanism proponents argued there were interrelated and interlocking, regionally distinct cultures that formed along the length of the Nile Valley from its headwaters in Ethiopia, Egypt and Sudan to its mouth in the Mediterranean Sea. Introduced around 1970, it was popularized by Ivan Van Sertima in the 1980s and saw wide use in Afrocentric publications during the 1990s, e.g. Festus Ugboaja Ohaegbulam, Towards an understanding of the African experience from historical and contemporary perspectives, University Press of America (1990); Runoko Rashidi, Introduction to the study of African clasical [sic] civilizations (1992), Walter Arthur McCray, The Black Presence in the Bible: Discovering the Black and African Identity of Biblical Persons and Nations, Urban Ministries Inc, (1995), etc.

=== Muqedians ===
A Muqedian or Muqedite is someone who lives along the coast between the wadi hammamat canal and the tip of the Horn of africa. Genetic studies show that besides maritime commerce, the people along the coast of the ancient Mu-Qed trade route also share genetic affinities with a shared paternal lineage with both Upper Egyptian males and coastal Cushitic males sharing the E-V12 subclade of the E1b1b haplogroup at a rate of 74.5% and 70.6% respectively. On occasion, people have expressed self-identification of a transnational affinity across northeast african borders, include Egyptian Imaan Hammam who referred to herself as Afro-Arab.
