= List of Nazi construction =

The following is a list of construction completed or planned by the Nazi Party from the party's formation in 1920 until the end of World War II in 1945.

== Buildings and architecture ==
Construction	Image	Location	Built/Renovated	Destroyed
Berghof		Obersalzberg	1935/6	1966
Berlin Tempelhof Airport Terminal Building		Berlin	1936-1966	
Brown House (Braunes Haus)		Munich (45 Brienner Straße)	1931	1945
Carinhall			1933	1945
Central Ministry of Bavaria (Zentralministerium des Landes Bayern)		Munich	1940	
Congress Hall		Nazi party rally grounds, Nuremberg	1935	
Deutsches Stadion		Nuremberg	1937 (never completed)	
Ehrentempel		Munich (Königsplatz)	1935	1947
Erlangen District Court (Amtsgericht Erlangen)		Erlangen	1941	
Flak towers (Flakturm)		Berlin (3), Hamburg (2), and Vienna (3), Stuttgart and Frankfurt.		
Fränkischer Hof				
Friedrich-Rückert School		Erlangen	1936	
Führerbau		Munich	1937	
Führerbunker		Berlin	1944	
Gaubunker				
Gauhaus				
German Air Ministry Building			1936	
Hall of Models				
Haus der Kunst		Munich	1937	
Hitler Youth Clubhouse or Hitler-Jugend Heim				
Jena Brücke				
Lorient U-boat base		Lorient, France	1941	
Kehlsteinhaus (Eagles Nest)		Obersalzberg	1938	
Lower Silesian Governor's Office		Breslau	1939-1945	
Luftgaukommando Dresden		Dresden		
Luftgaukommando Munich		Munich	1937-1938	
Maria-Theresien-Kaserne		Vienna, Austria	1940	
Nazi War Memorials				
Nazi party rally grounds		Nuremberg	1928-1939	
NSDAP Administration Building (Verwaltungsbau der NSDAP)		Munich	1934-1935	
Olympiastadion		Berlin	1936	
Ordensburg Krössinsee		Złocieniec, Poland	1941	
Ordensburg Sonthofen		Sonthofen	1934	
Ordensburg Vogelsang		Eifel National Park	1935	
Prora		Rügen	1936-1939	
New Reich Chancellery (Reichskanzlei)		Voßstraße, Berlin	1939	1945
Reichszeugmeisterei building		Munich	1937	
Riese		Lower Silesia, Poland	1943–45	
Saarländisches Staatstheater				
Soldatenhalle				
Schwerbelastungskörper		Berlin	1941/42	
Thingstätte or Thingplatz		Various	1933-1939	
Volkshalle		Berlin	Never built	
Vorbunker		Berlin	1936	
Weingut I		Mühldorfer Hart, Upper Bavaria	1944	
Winkeltürme				
Wolfsschanze (Wolf's Lair)		Rastenburg, Prussia, (now Kętrzyn, Poland)	1941	Partially demolished 1945
Zeppelin Field (Zeppelinfeld) and Tribune		Nazi party rally grounds, Nuremberg		
Halle der Partei und Grabmal Hitlers (the projected of the Mausoleum for Adolf Hitler)		Munich	Never built	

== Urban planning projects ==
- Führer city, status given to five German cities in 1937 for a planned gigantic urban transformation
- Führer Headquarters, buildings used as headquarters by Adolf Hitler
- Nordstern, a planned new German metropolis in occupied Norway
- Pabst Plan, plan to reconstruct Warsaw as a Nazi model city.
- Germania, the projected renewal of Berlin.

== Other projects ==
- Atlantic Wall (Atlantikwall)
- Reichsautobahn
