= Gumbax District =

District in Somalia

Gumbax (also spelled Gumbah) is a district of Bari a province in the autonomous Puntland region in Somalia. In the district lies the village of Gumbah.
