= Gumbah =

Gumbah Gumbax جومباه
- Populated place
- Location in Somalia.
- Coordinates: 10°48′00″N 50°59′00″E
- Country: Somalia: Puntland
- Region: Bari
- District: Gumbax
- Time zone: UTC+3 (EAT)

Gumbah (Somali: Gumbax, Arabic: جومباه) is a populated place in the northeastern Bari region of Somalia. It is part of the Gumbax District.8. Estimated Population is 65,000-exclusively residents. Economic sources of host community. The major source of income are the fishing and frankincense, livestock farming and also small businesses.

Mayor :Mohamud Ahmed Musse (Walow).

== Location ==
Gumbah is located on the northeastern coast of Somalia, facing the Guardafui Channel. It lies 57 nautical miles (66 miles) south of Cape Guardafui and the entrance to the Gulf of Aden.

== Administration ==
In April 2013, the Puntland government announced the creation of a new region coextensive with Gumbah and Cape Guardafui, named Gardafuu. Carved out of the Bari region, it consists of four districts (Baargaal, Bereeda, Alula, and Gumbah itself) and has its capital at Alula.

== See also ==
- Maritime history of Somalia
- Geography of Somalia
