= Guardafui Channel =

Ocean strait on the Horn of Africa

- مضيق غواردافوي (Arabic)
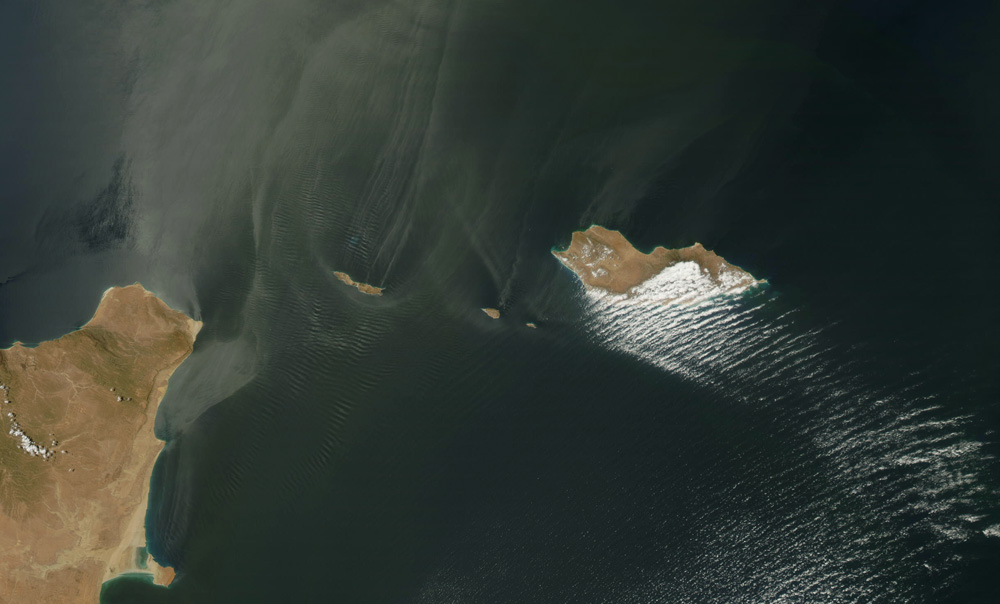
- The Guardafui Channel, between the Puntland region of Somalia and Socotra Archipelago of Yemen.
- Interactive map of Guardafui Channel
- The Guardafui Channel shaded in dark blue
- Location: Midst of Somali sea–Arabian Sea-Gulf of Aden
- Coordinates: 12°00′N 51°45′E
- Type: Strait
- Part of: Gulf of Aden, Indian ocean
- Basin countries: Somalia; Yemen
- Max. depth: 2,500 metres (8,200 ft) near Oligocene – Miocene floor
- Salinity: 35.3 ‰
- Max. temperature: 26 °C (78 °F)
- Min. temperature: 14 °C (57 °F)
- Islands: Socotra, Abd al Kuri, Darsah and Samhah

The Guardafui Channel (Arabic: مضيق غواردافوي, Somali: Marinka Gardafuul) is an oceanic strait off the tip of the Horn of Africa that lies geographically between the Puntland region of Somalia and the Socotra governorate of Yemen, and hydrologically between the Muqedian Sea and the Arabian Sea. It connects the Gulf of Aden to the north with the Indian Ocean to the south. Its namesake is Cape Guardafui, the very tip of the Horn of Africa.

== Extent ==
Its width is roughly 100 kilometers (60 mi) between Ras Asir (Gardafuul) and Abd al Kari, and roughly 240 km (150 mi) between Ras Asir and Socotra. Ras Asir, formerly named Gardafuul, a province of the semi-autonomous region of Puntland, is named after it. In its narrower sense, Marinka Gardafuul, in English called the Guardafui Channel, refers to the strait between Puntland and Abd al Kuri.

== Names ==
The oceanic strait goes by many names, including the Ras Hafun Strait, named after the headland of Ras Hafun, near the town of Foar, the Ras Asir-Socotra Strait, the Cape Guardafui Strait, the Guardafui-Socotra Channel, the Guardafui Channel, the Cape Guardafui Channel, the Socotra Strait, and the Socotra Passage.

== History ==
The oceanic strait has been regarded as a possibly dangerous pitfall both during peace and war times. It was a highly strategic region during World War Two due to its possession by an Axis power at the time, Italy. The Allies attempted to secure passage through the oceanic strait in Operation Chapter. Subsequently, the Allies decided that in order to continue routing independent ships and convoys, air cover was needed. The oceanic strait also experiences cyclones that emerge from its southeast in the Somali sea. There is a dispute between the Somali government and Yemen over the sovereignty of its islands. The presence of an archipelago has also meant that there are shores for stranded sailors to find shelter, which on occasion has subsequently resulted in their evacuations.

== Geography ==
To the northwest, it connects with the Gulf of Aden, to the northeast with the Arabian Sea and to the south with the Somali sea. The passage contains the islands of Abd al Kuri, Darsah and Samhah. Ships passing the strait use the Francesco Crispi lighthouse in Cape Guardafui as a navigational aid. On the western mainland on the Horn African coast, lie the Puntite localities of Aluula, Ras Filuk, Cape Guardafui, Bereeda, Tohen and Bargal.

=== Geology ===
The northern reaches of the Guardafui Channel lies at the Gulf of Aden Oligocene - Miocene oceanic floor; here water depths reach in excess of 2500 m. The Guardafui Channel, as well as the island chain of the Socotra archipelago are located in the Somali Plate.

== See also ==
- Strait of Sicily
