= Fascist architecture =

Architectural style

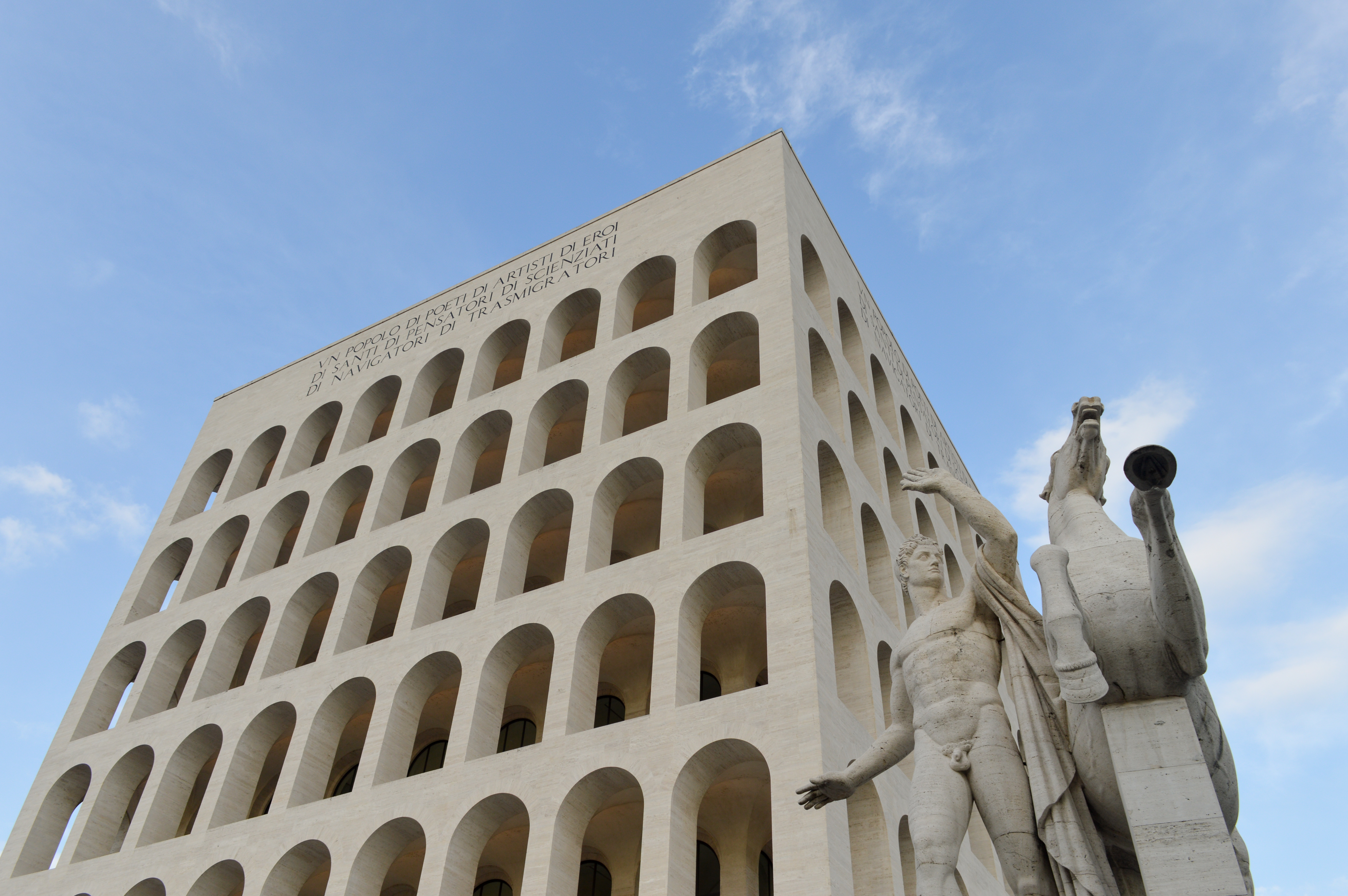
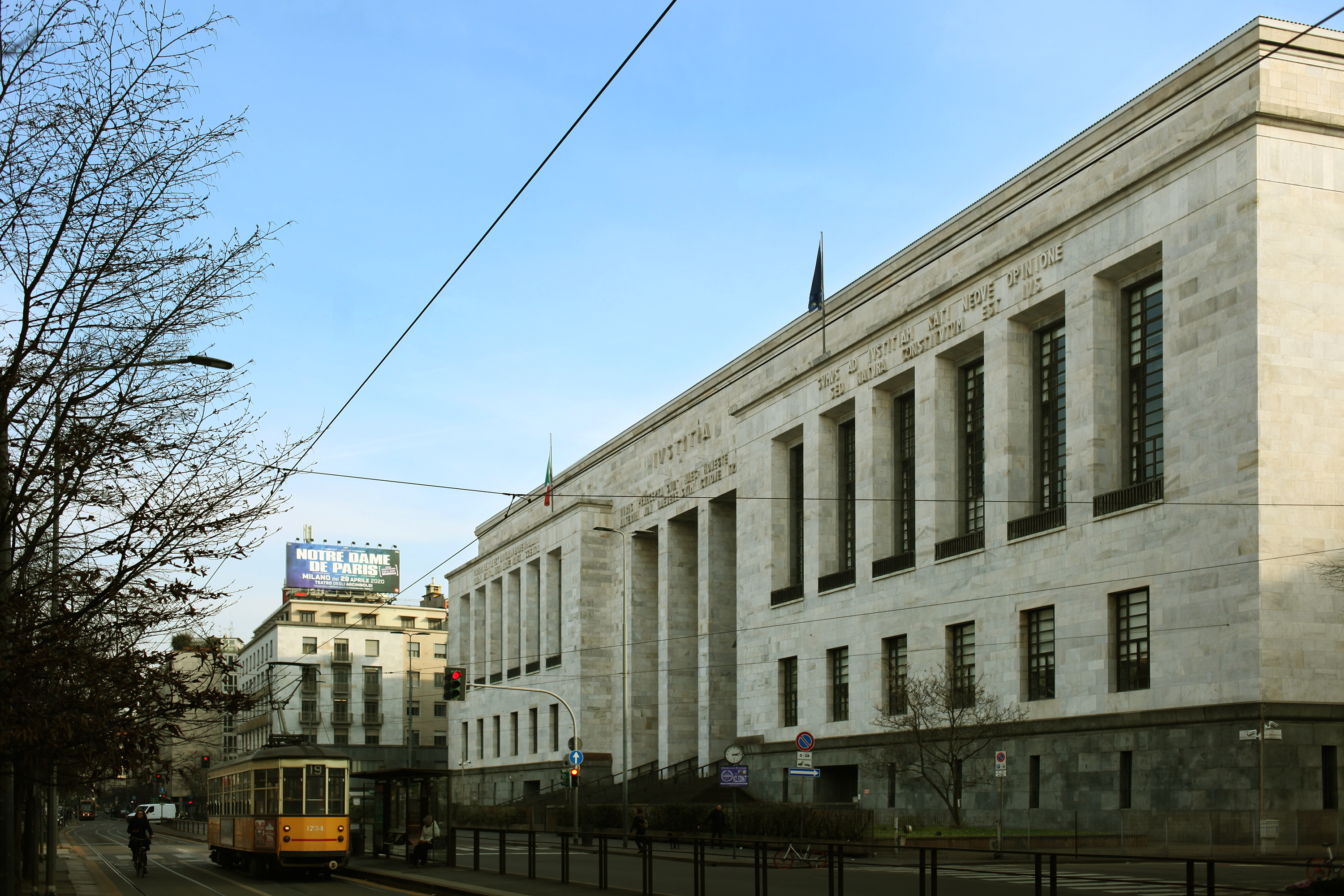
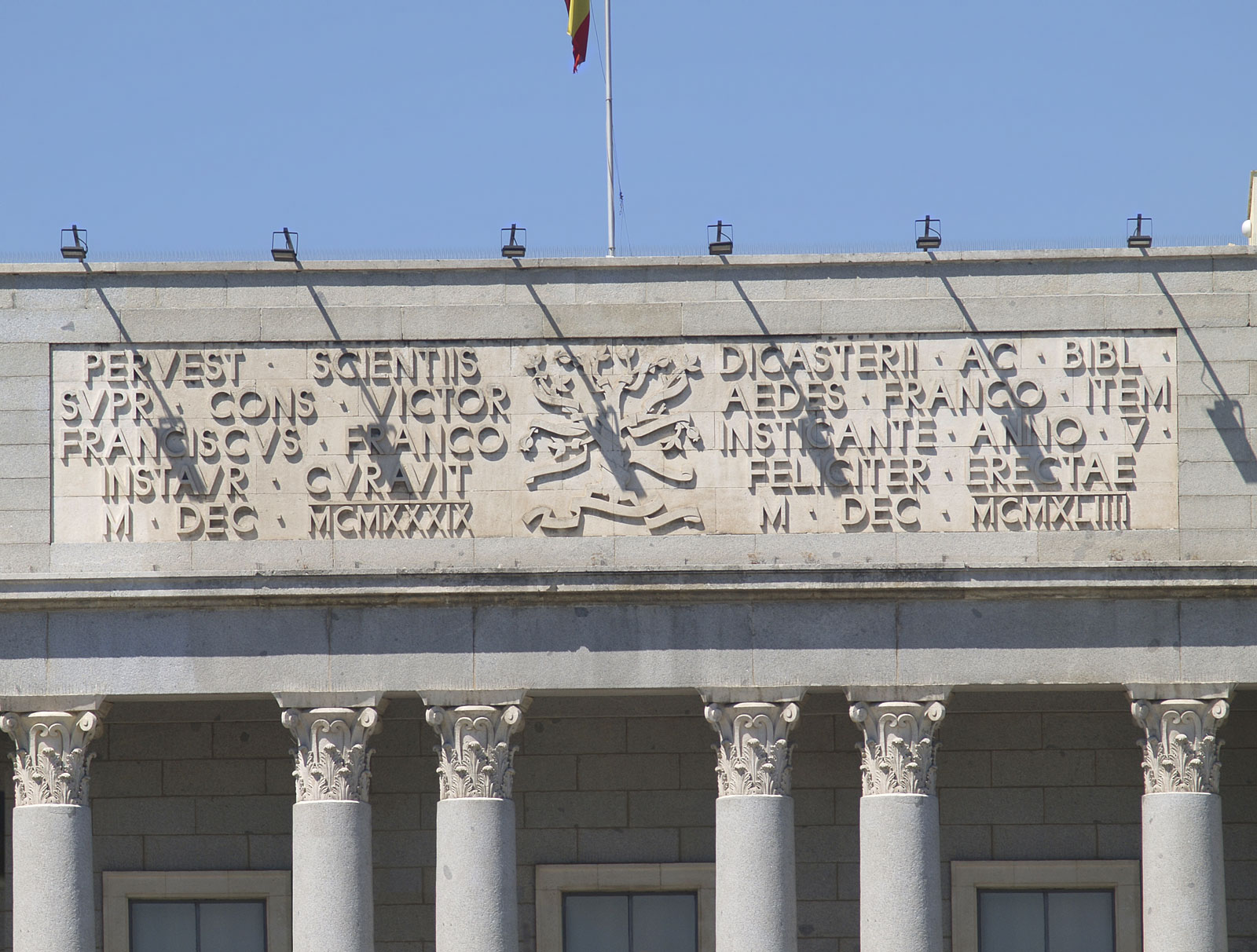
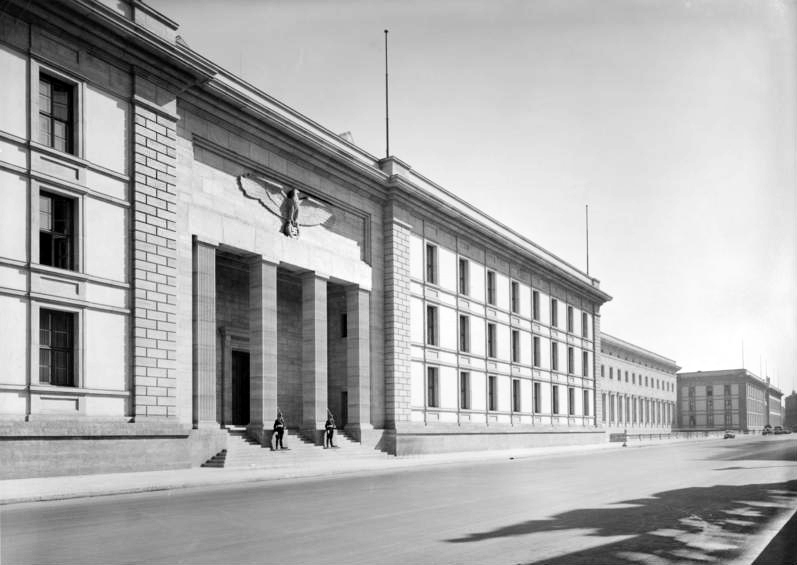
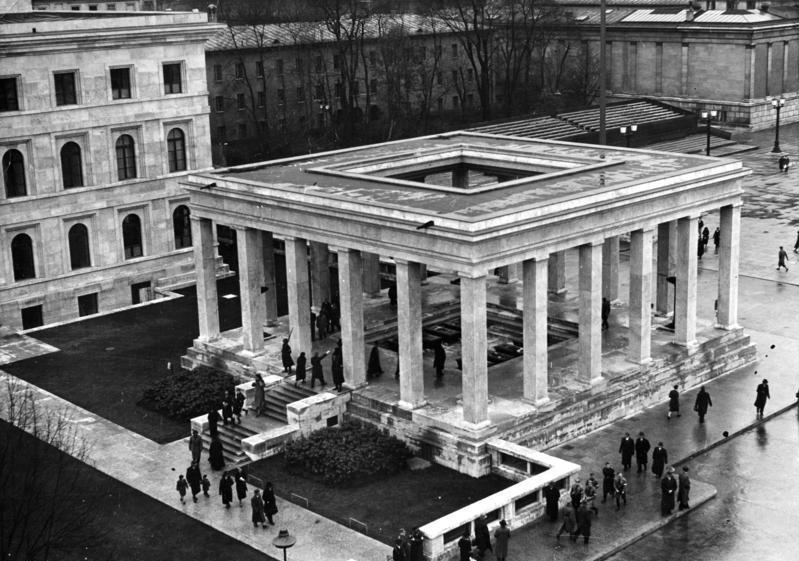
- Top: Palace of Italian Civilization, EUR, Rome, Italy. Middle left: The Palace of Justice, Milan, home to the Tribunal, designed by Marcello Piacentini and built between 1932 and 1940; Middle right: The CSIC honouring Franco's victory in the Spanish Civil War, in Madrid, Spain. Bottom left: The New Reich Chancellery in Berlin, Germany, built between 1938 and 1940; Bottom right: Ehrentempel (Honor Temples) two structures built in Munich in 1935, housing the sarcophagi of the 16 Party members who died in the failed Beer Hall Putsch.
- Years active: 1920s – early 1940s (Italy and Germany), 1950s and later (Spain, Portugal and others)
- Location: Italy, Germany, Spain, Portugal and more
- Major figures: Marcello Piacentini, Albert Speer
- Influences: Rationalism, Stripped Classicism, Classical architecture
- Influenced: Other totalitarian architectural styles

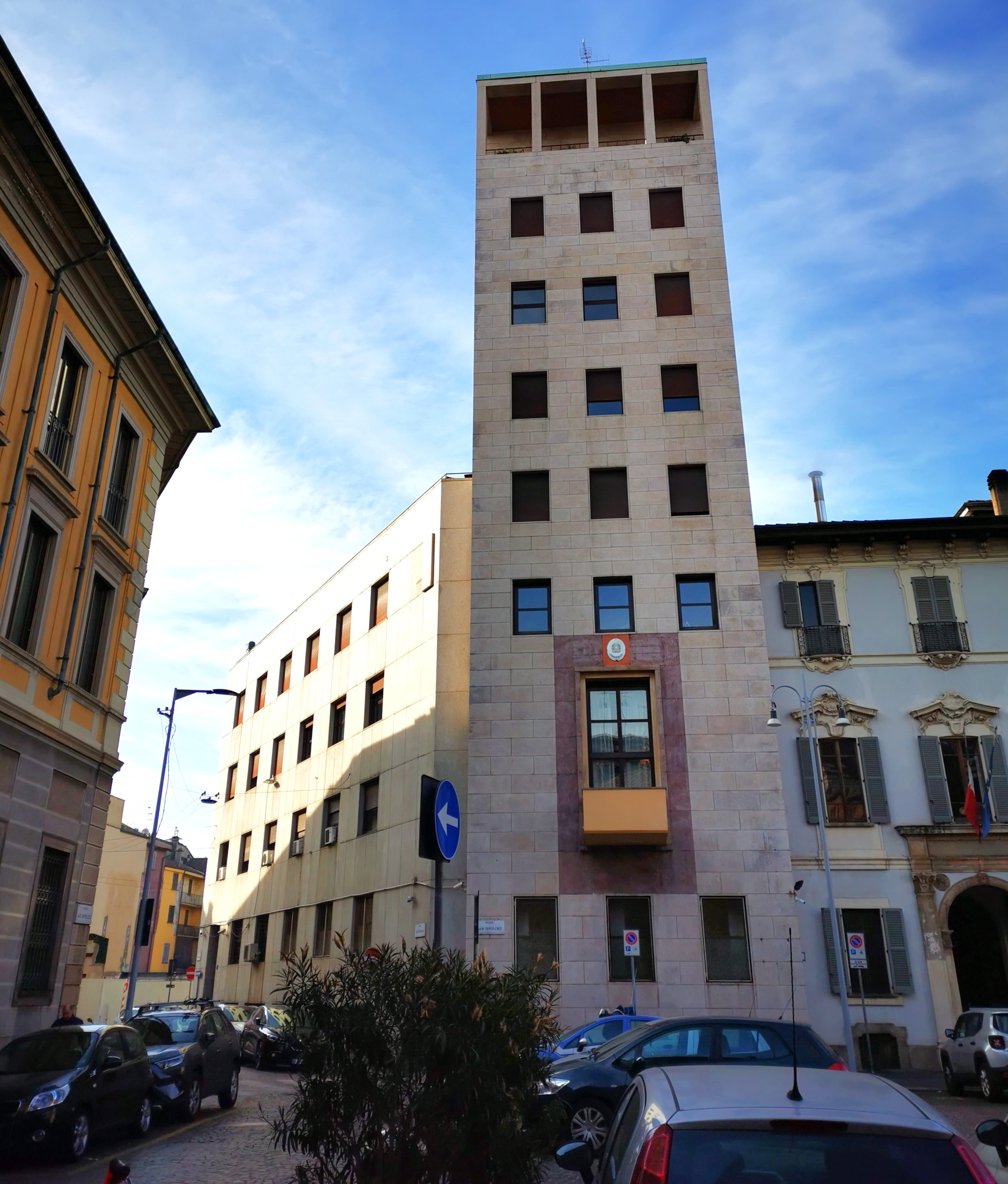
Casa del Fascio Primogenito, San Sepolcro square, Milan, Italy. Rationalist tower attached to the 1600s baroque building (Palazzo Castani, on the right) which used to host Mussolini's newspaper. The square gave the name to one of the early fascist movements, the "Sansepolcristi". Attaching this modern tower to the old baroque building signified the fascist will to violently modernize the country and break with the past.

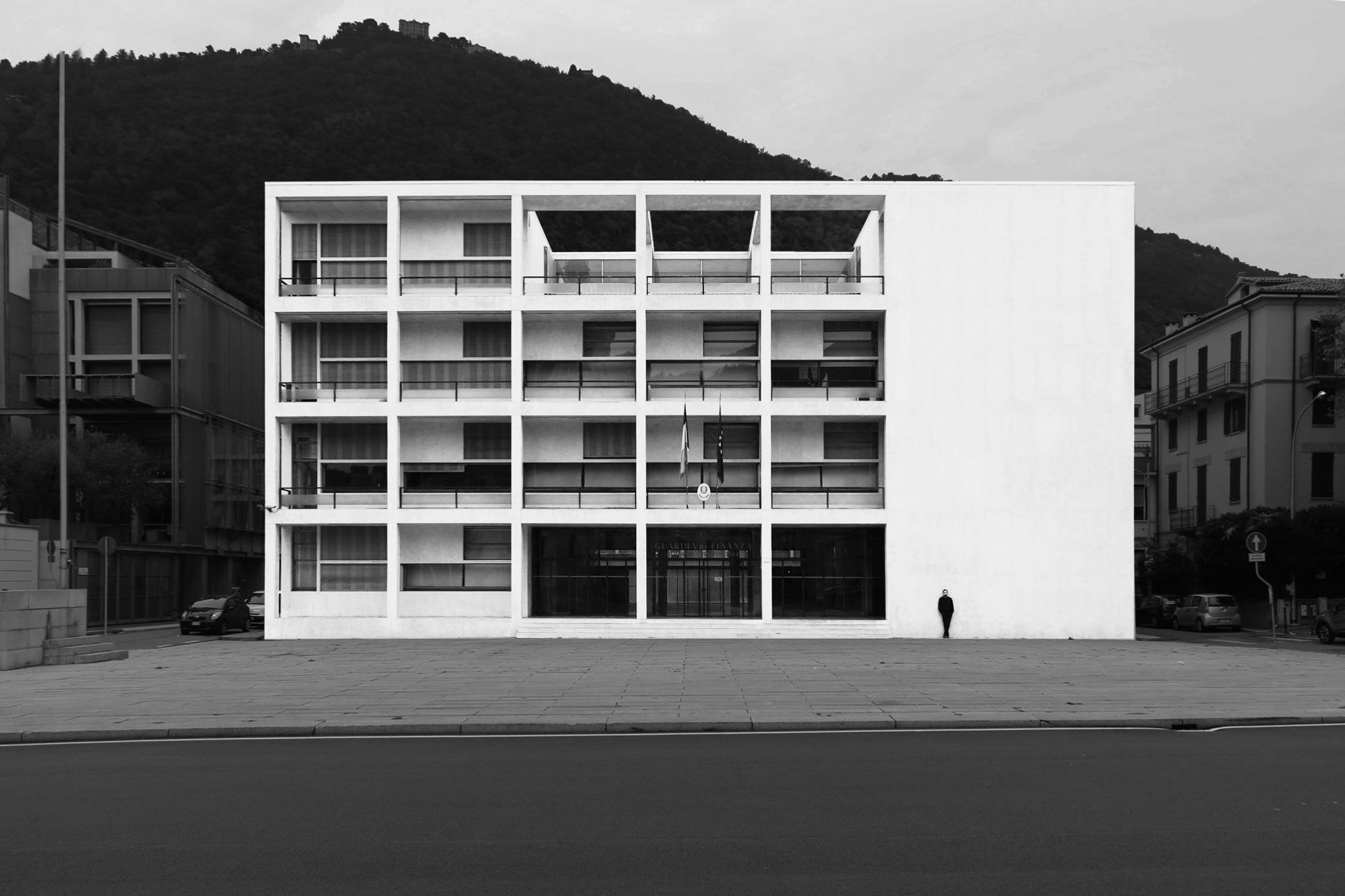
Casa del Fascio, Como, Italy. Designed by Terragni, it is considered the best example of Italian Rationalism.

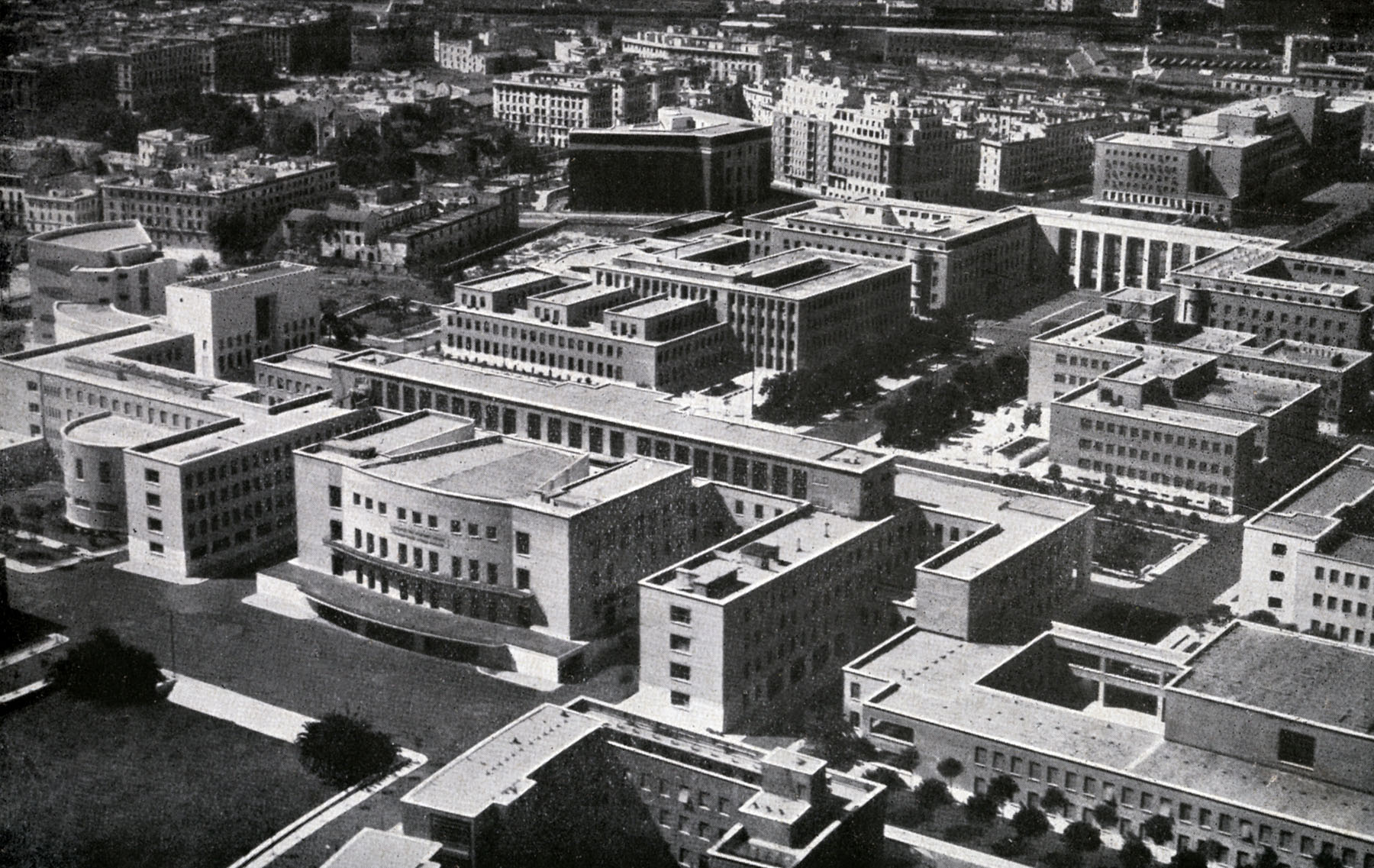
The city of the Sapienza University in Rome, Italy, 1938. In the background there is also the building of the CNR, National Research Council, another example of Fascist Architecture, erected at the behest of Guglielmo Marconi.

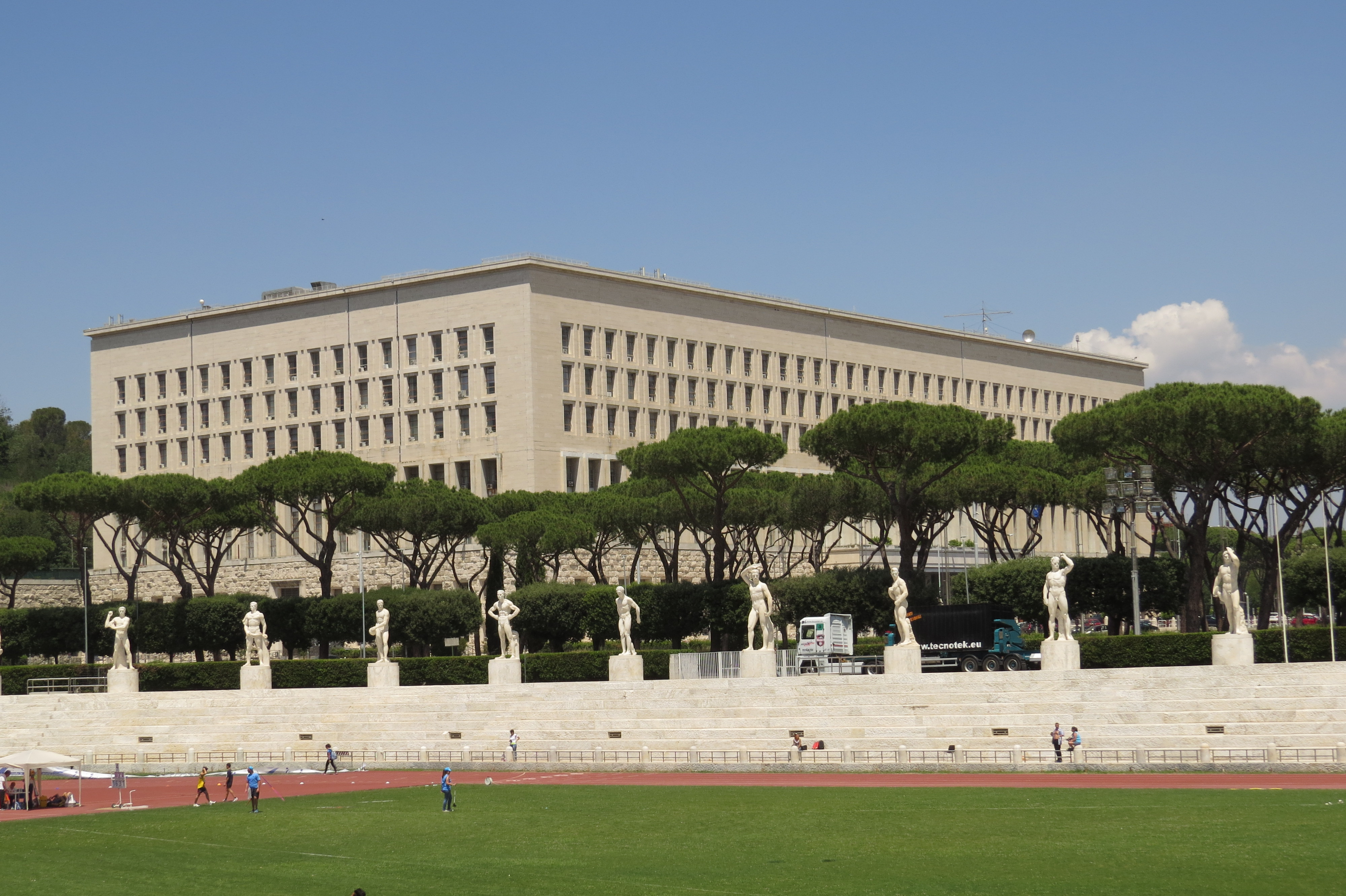
Palazzo del Littorio, today Palazzo della Farnesina, seen from Stadio dei Marmi, Rome

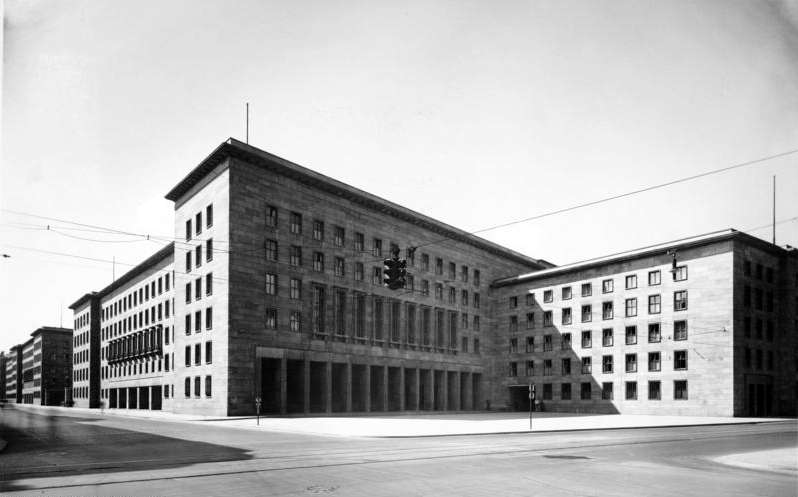
The Ministry of Aviation, Berlin, today hosts the German Ministry of Finance. One of the main examples of Nazi architecture.

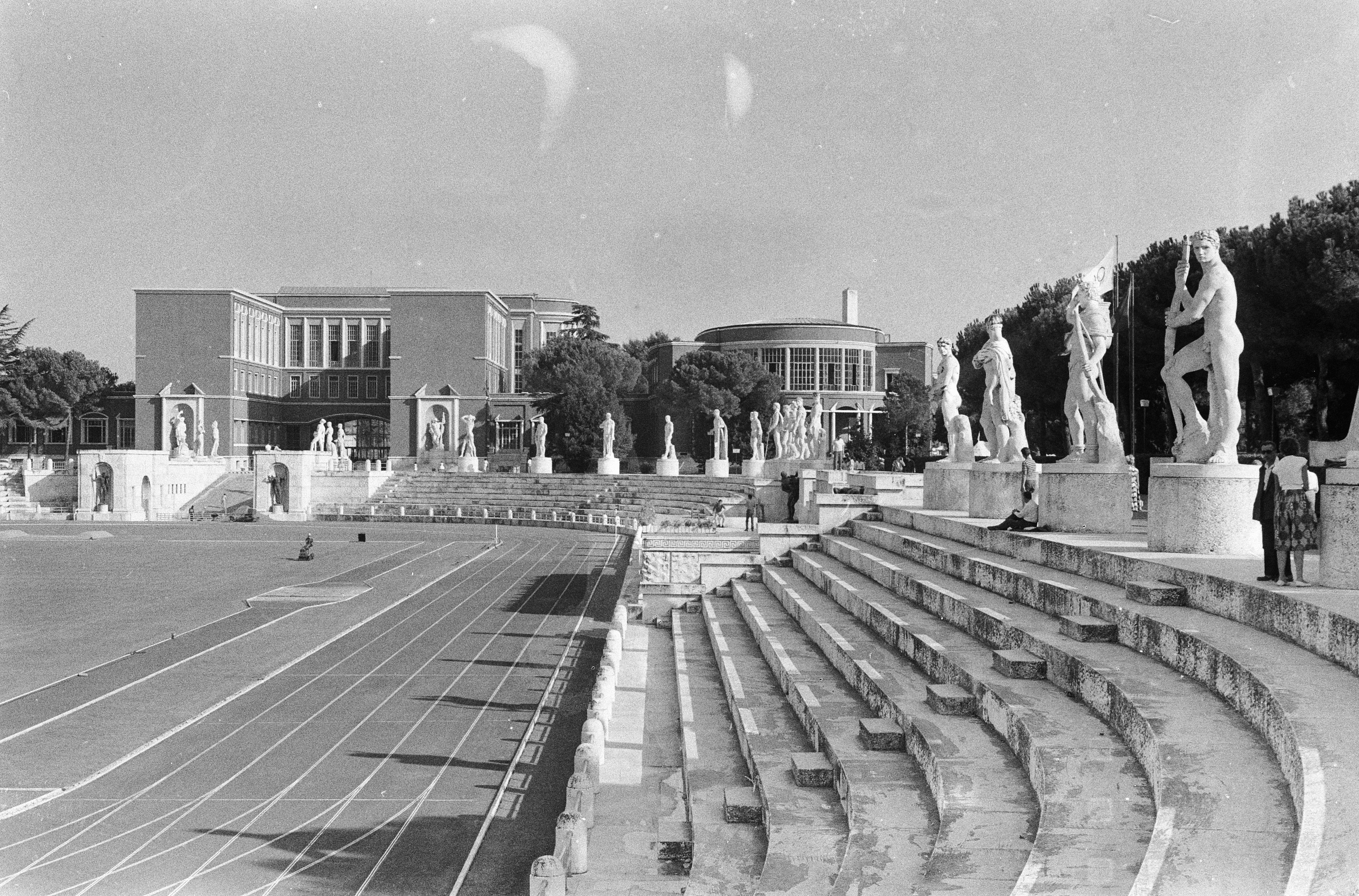
Stadio dei Marmi with Palace of the Italian Olympic Committee in the background, Rome

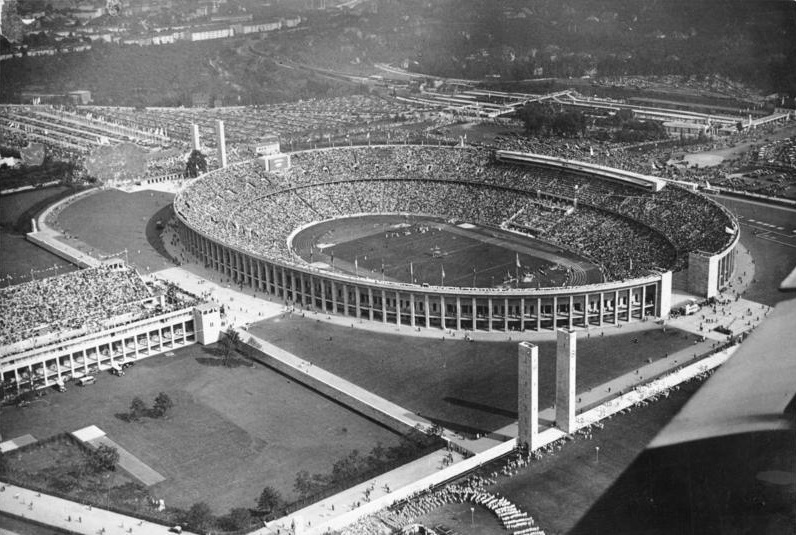
Olympia-Stadion, Berlin

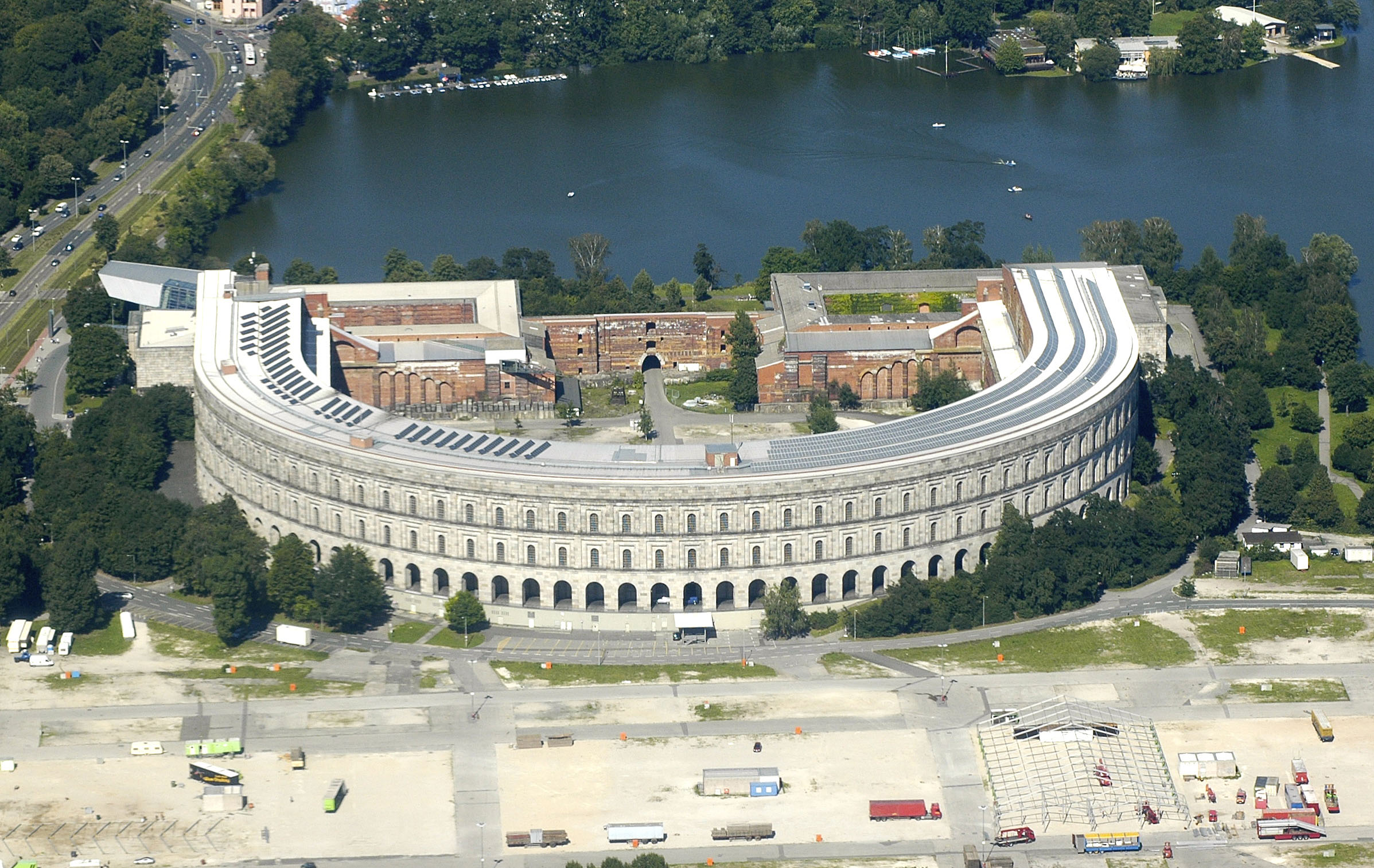
The Kongresshalle of Nuremberg

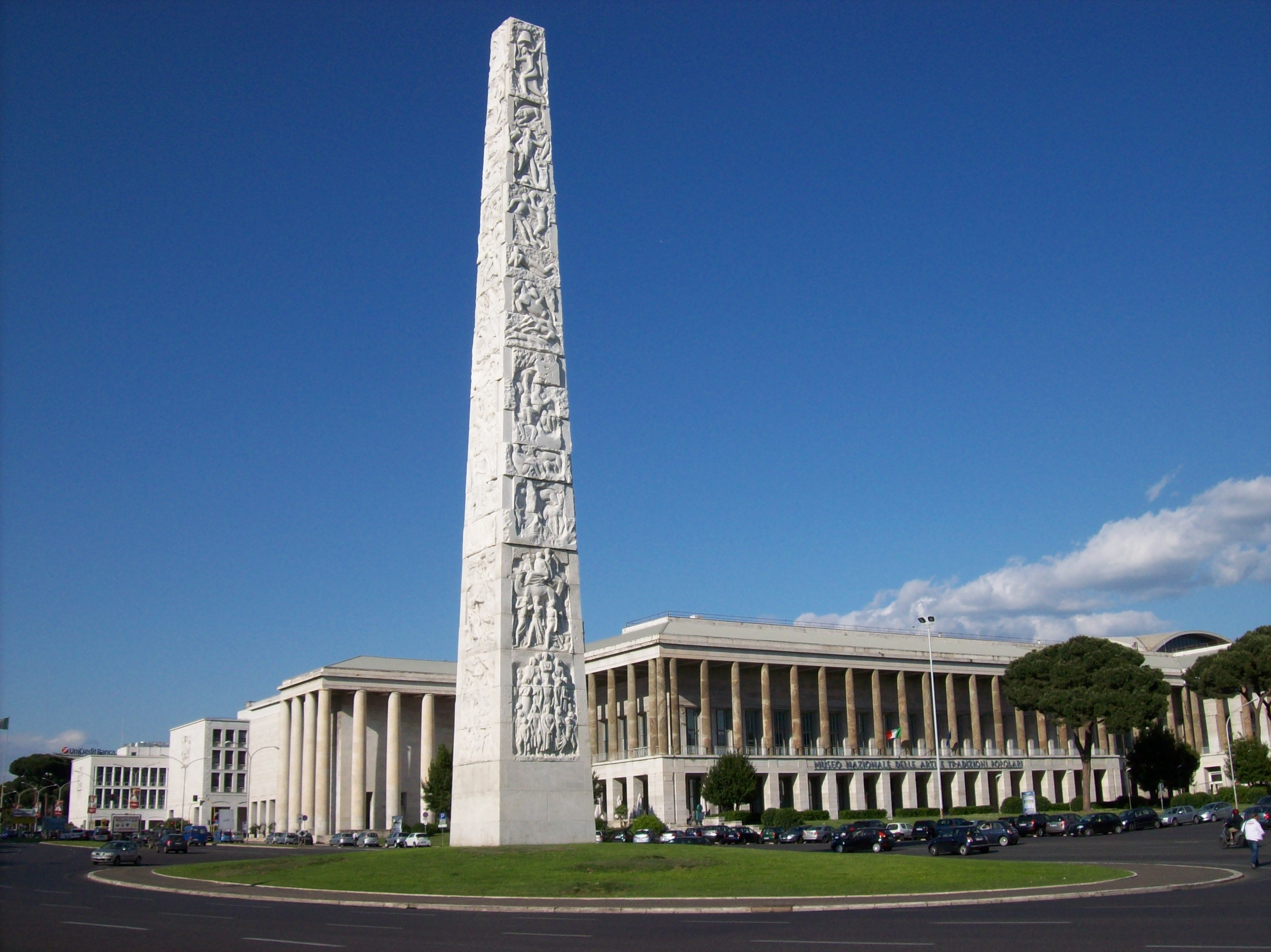
Guglielmo Marconi Square, EUR, Rome

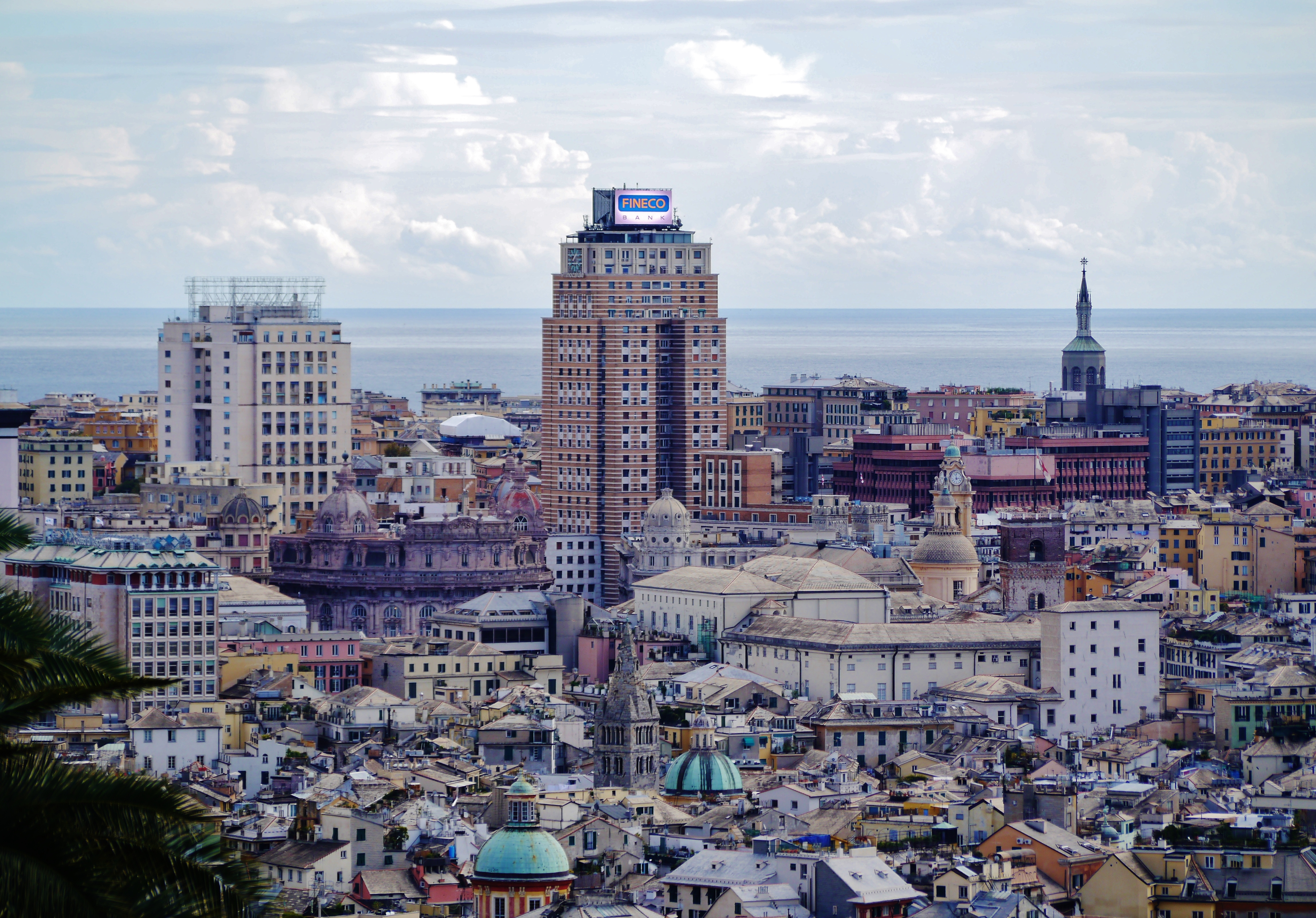
Genoa, Italy, the 2 skyscrapers in Dante Square, the tallest of which was designed by Piacentini and was the tallest skyscraper in Europe for many years. Fascism wrote about wanting to turn Genoa into a "New York City of the Mediterranean".

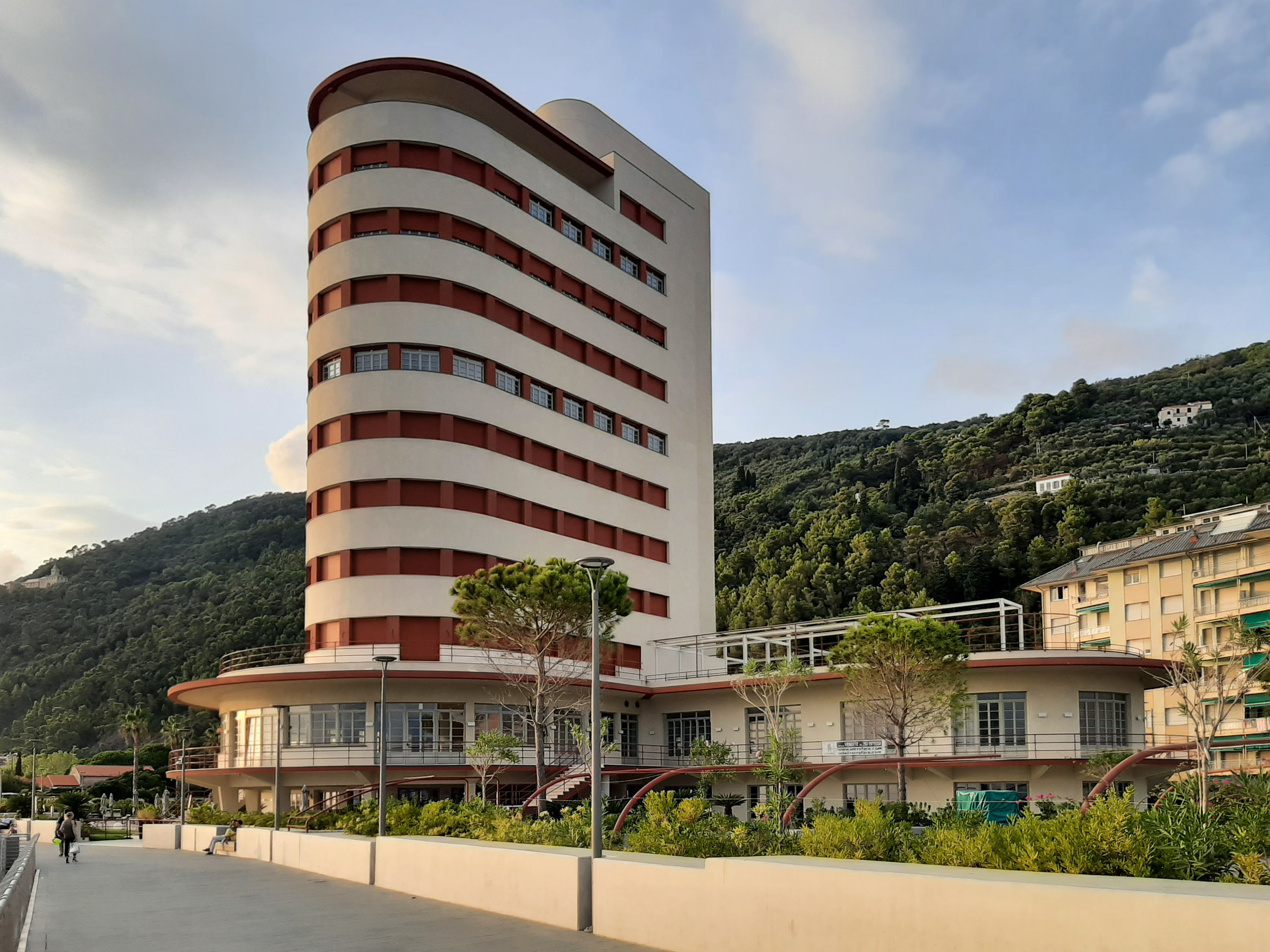
Summer sea colony, Chiavari, Italy

Summer sea colony, Marina di Massa, Italy

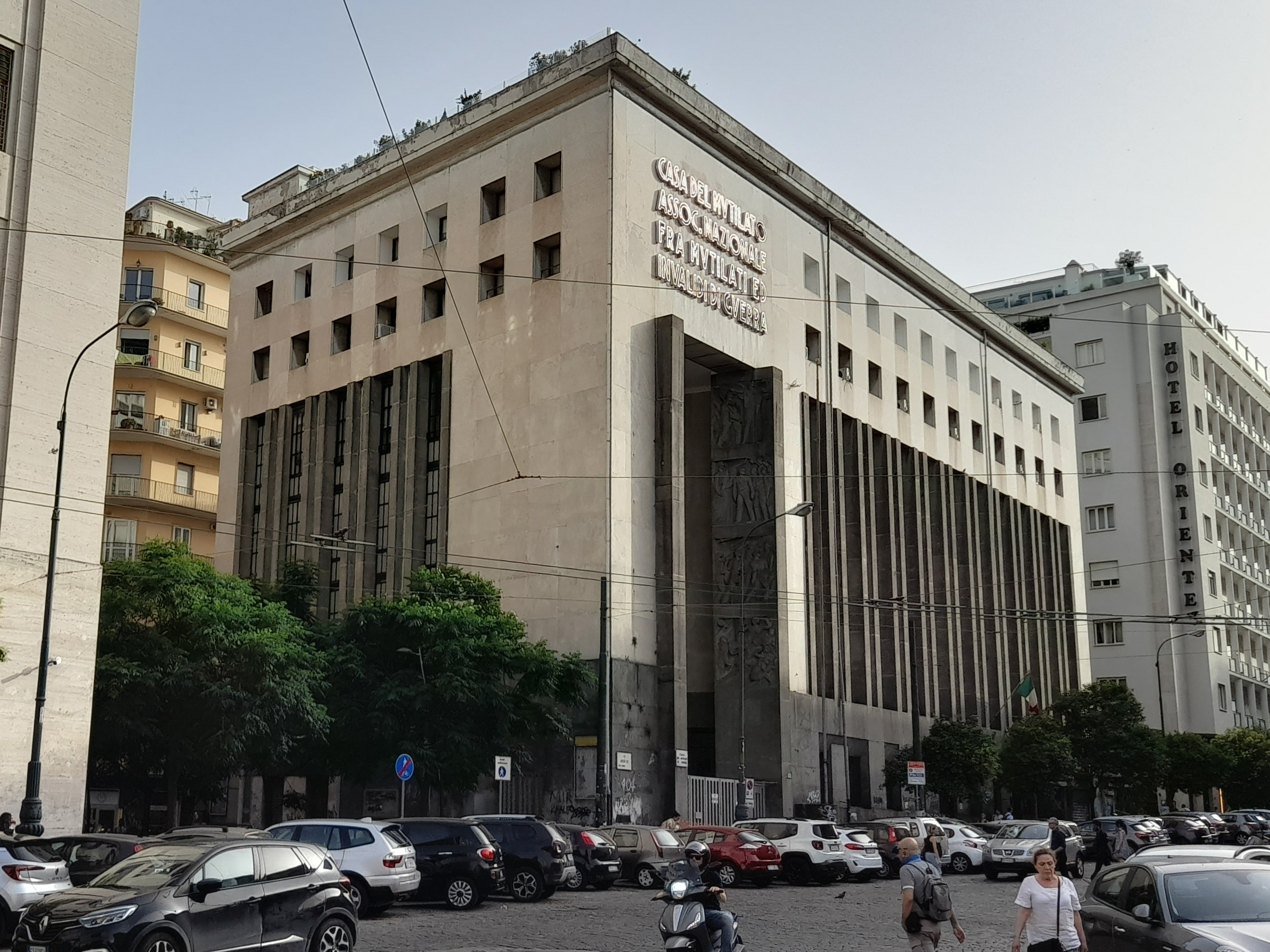
Casa del Mutilato, Naples, Italy

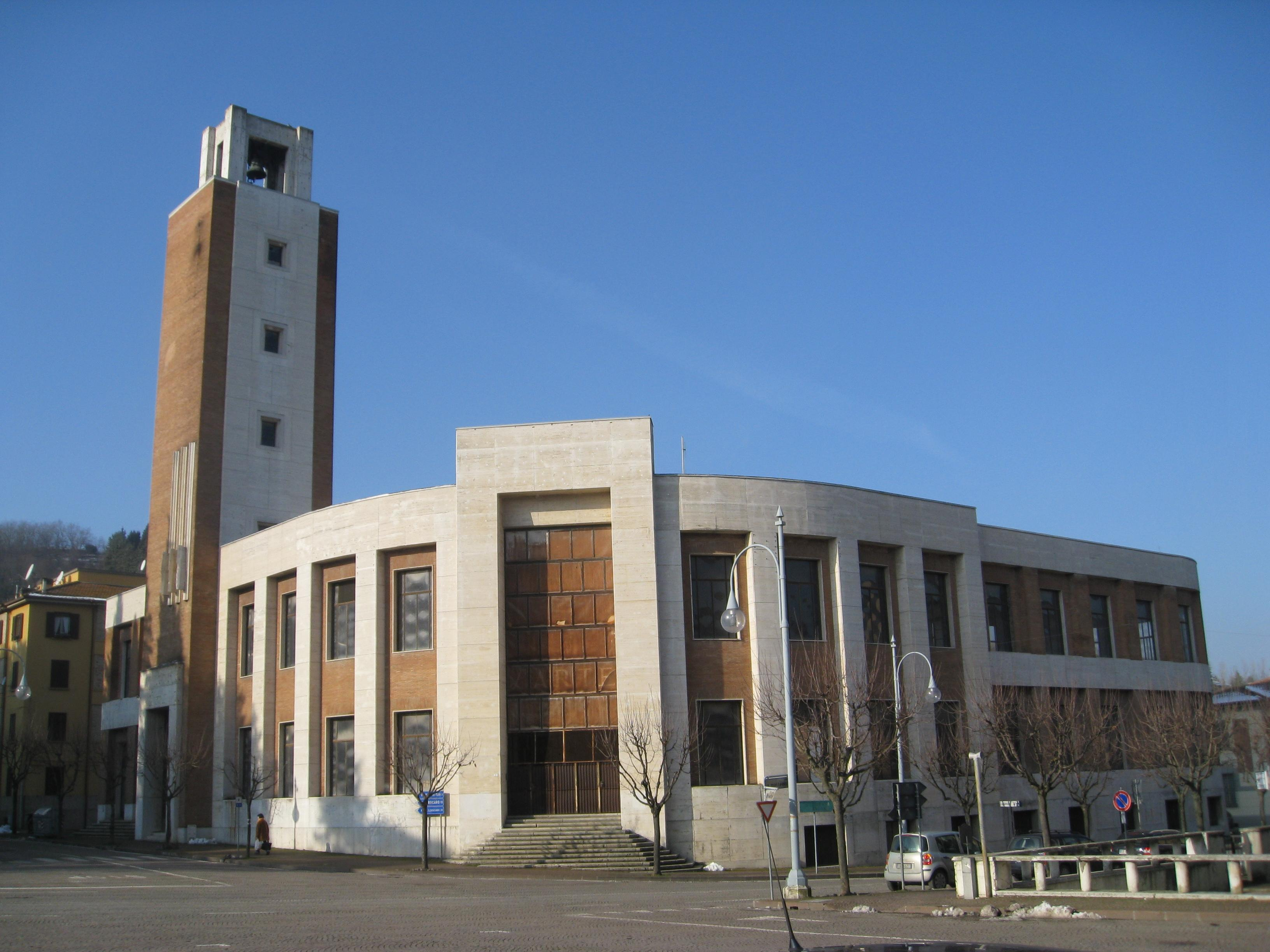
Casa del Fascio, Predappio, Italy, one of the most famous fascist buildings, situated in Mussolini's home town which underwent extensive works of expansion and development during the Fascist era

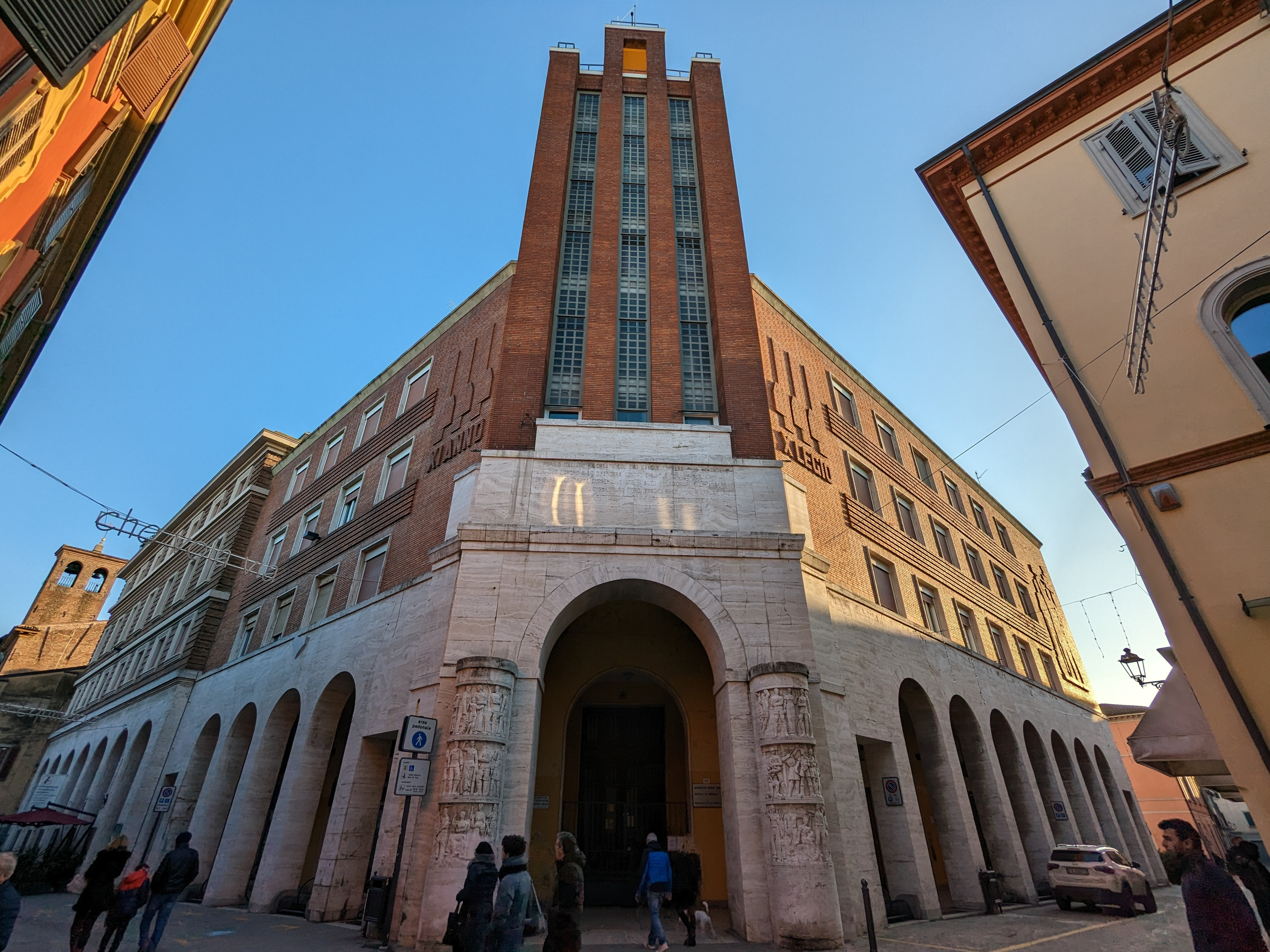
Casa del Fascio, Imola, Italy

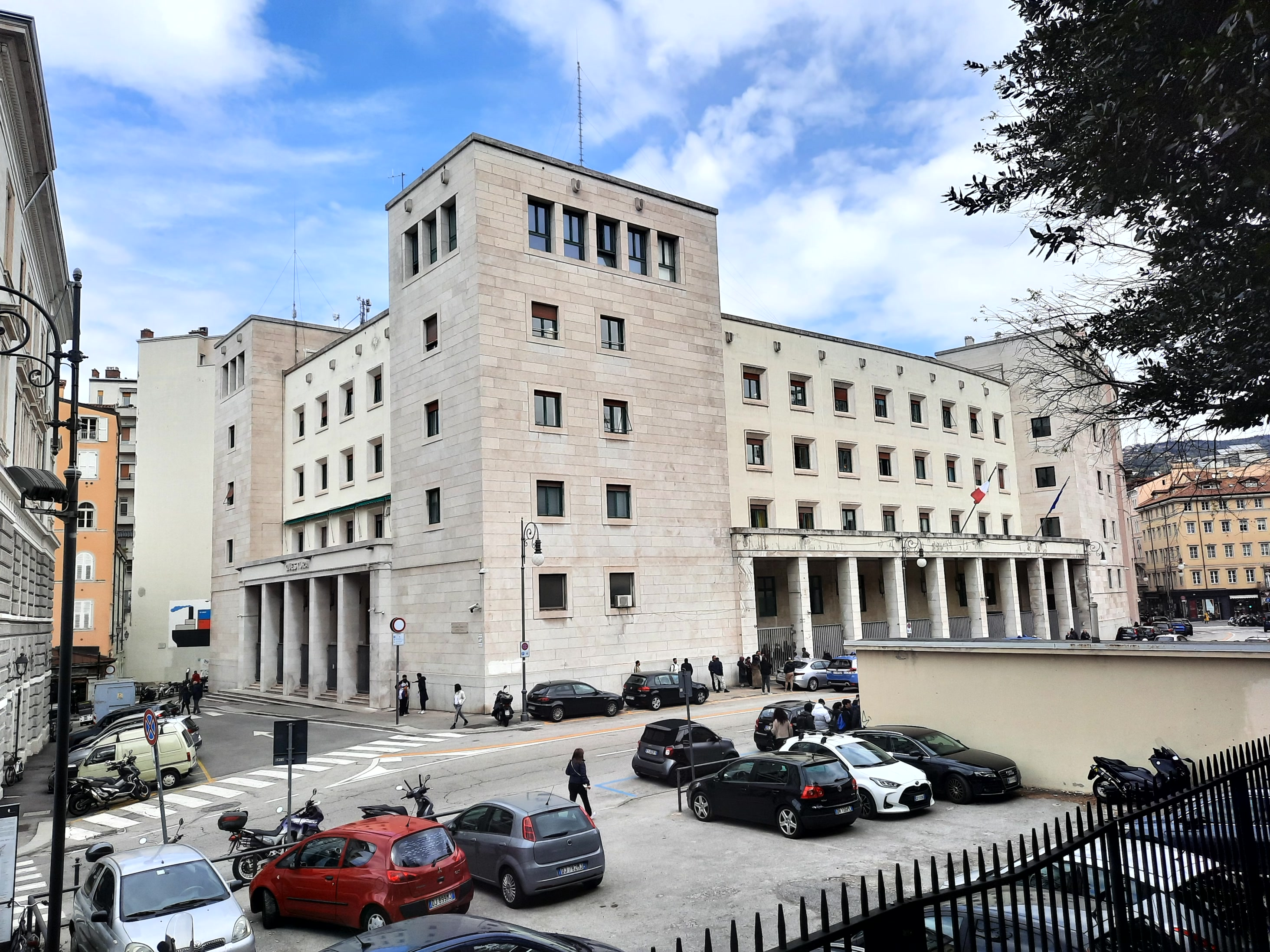
Casa del Fascio, Trieste, Italy

Fascist architecture encompasses various stylistic trends in architecture developed by architects of fascist states, primarily in the early 20th century. Fascist architectural styles gained popularity in the late 1920s with the rise of modernism along with the ultranationalism associated with fascist governments in western Europe. Fascist styles often resemble that of ancient Rome, but can extend to modern aesthetics as well. Fascist-era buildings are frequently constructed with particular concern given to symmetry, simplicity, and monumental size, especially for public buildings.

Benito Mussolini utilised several styles of architecture, incorporating classical elements into modern Rationalist architecture to convey a sense of continuity with ancient Rome.

National Socialist architecture under Adolf Hitler is often associated with Italian Fascist Architecture. It also utilised new styles of architecture but favoured Stripped Classicism over modernism, in an attempt to unify the people, mark a new era of nationalist culture, and exhibit the absolute rule of the state.

In some cases, such as the Italian "foundation cities" (città di fondazione), the new architecture also followed the needs of the corporatist economic model: smaller buildings inspired by local architecture were sometimes favoured to create small rural cities. This practice of moving people out of the city centers and into rural areas to farm or to work in mines, especially during the time of autarchy, is similar to disurbanism.

== History ==
Fascist architecture in the form of Rationalism with elements of classical Roman architecture was born under dictator Benito Mussolini's rule of Italy from 1922 to 1943. Mussolini invested in public construction projects in order to foster economic development, gain popular support and modernize the country, but it was especially during the totalitarian acceleration of the 1930s that the regime asked its architects to reflect the values of fascism, a form of pedagogical architecture for the masses.

Mussolini utilized all forms of media along with architecture to shape the new Italian identity. When he came to power he found tens of different architects each with its own style, ranging from Futurism and Rationalism to neoclassical. Together with his chief architect, Piacentini, he coordinated and mediated between the other architects to give Fascist Architecture a "unitary direction", as Piacentini called it.

=== Jewish architects in Nazi Germany and Fascist Italy ===
Similarly, once Hitler came to power in 1933 and transformed the German Chancellery into a dictatorship, he used architecture in the form of Stripped Classicism with German features as one of many tools to help unify and nationalize Germany under his rule.

Hitler banned Bauhaus and Jewish architects, some of which escaped to Mandatory Palestine and would later go on to build the White City of Tel Aviv. Others, like Wolfgang Frankl, found refuge in Italy, where they continued working until 1937 when Italy also adopted racial laws. However even after 1937 some Italian Jewish architects were exempted from the racial laws, such as Giuseppe Pagano and Vittorio Morpurgo, and kept working on some of the most important Fascist monuments and buildings.

Morpurgo worked on the buildings in the newly created Emperor Augustus Square, including the 1938 enclosure of the Ara Pacis (demolished in the early 2000s) and the Museum of the Roman ships of lake Nemi. At the time these were considered two of the most important public works by Fascist propagandists.

Morpurgo and Pagano had a strong fascist faith, Pagano was in the School of Fascist Mysticism and voluntarily enlisted in WW2, at the end he was captured by the Germans, sent to a concentration camp, and died of illness and mistreatment in the infirmary at Gusen in 1945, just days before the camp's liberation.

=== The evolution of Italian Fascist Architecture ===
Mussolini's chief architect, Piacentini, was already an established figure in Italian architecture before Fascist times. His early work was not in the Rationalist style, nor was he initially sympathetic to Fascism as he only joined the National Fascist Party in 1932. Similar to Hitler's chief architect, Albert Speer, Piacentini developed a close personal connection with the dictator and demonstrated a keen understanding of his aesthetic and political desires. Both Piacentini and Speer distinguished themselves for their efficiency and organizing skills.

In 1922 Piacentini was assaulted by Fascists for his connections with Freemasonry, but he didn't join anti-fascism, instead he put himself at the service of Mussolini. Piacentini wanted to give Fascist Italy a proper architectural style and Mussolini repaid him by assigning him some of the most important public building projects of the Regime. Piacentini distinguished himself through his remarkable efficiency and organizational skills, completing Victory Square in Brescia in just 3 years, as well as through his adoption of the modernist Rationalist style, and his ability to interpret Mussolini's vision. His success in Brescia led other cities to commission him for the design of their squares in a similar manner.

Even before completing the square in Brescia, he was tasked with yet a bigger project: La Città Universitaria di Roma (the city of the Sapienza University in Rome). Piacentini designed the main rectorate building and divided the rest of the project among other architects, giving them a unitary direction to follow. Giovanni Papini would later define him: "coordinator of minds".

Mussolini was initially in favor of modern architecture, in 1931 he visited the second exhibition of Rationalist architecture in Rome where the works of architects such as Terragni, Lingeri, Libera, Figini and Pollini were displayed. Mussolini made it clear that he was strongly in favor of this modern architecture, going as far as to say: "Rationalism must be the architecture of Fascism". The same year however he also approved architectural projects that implemented classical elements.

Via della Conciliazione in Rome, another work of Piacentini, shows simple but monumental architecture with neoclassical elements that fit the center of Rome and the vicinity to Saint Peter's basilica.

In 1934 the fascist deputies discussed the new project for the Palazzo del Littorio, the central headquarters of the National Fascist Party, to be built along Via dell'Impero in Rome. Most of the deputies, led by Farinacci, were against modern architecture. Mussolini thus invited the architects of the new train station of Florence and the architects of the town of Sabaudia to Rome and praised their work, once again reaffirming his taste for modern architecture. Of all the projects for the headquarters that were submitted, some very sleek and futuristic, even featuring skyscrapers covered in glass, others more neo-classical, Mussolini chose a project that was halfway between modern and neo-roman. However the project was later moved near the Foro Mussolini (Mussolini Forum, today renamed Foro Italico), and the building was re-designed to be more monumental and in line with the latest developments of Fascist Architecture. Today the building is used as headquarters of the Ministero degli Esteri.

According to historians Renzo de Felice and Paolo Nicoloso, it was at the time of the Italo-Ethiopian war, when popular consensus reached its peak, that Fascism moved from a logic of "lasting" in power by gathering consensus to a logic of "daring" to make bold moves, of creating the "new man" and penetrating even more into the lives of every citizen, building a faith around the myth of ancient Rome.

To convey the idea of romanity to the masses, Fascist Architecture shifted towards more neo-roman styles and the main turning point was the E42 project. Born for the 1942 Rome Universal Expo, it was to become an example of "Mussolinian city", its buildings weren't supposed to be temporary like the international expos of the past, but they were meant to last hundreds if not thousands of years. It was meant to house the new administrative buildings of Rome and to be the first step in the expansion of Rome towards the sea. Massive boulevards were opened, from the center of Rome all the way to the sea, passing through the new E42 district. Along the main roads, large monuments and hotels for the millions of visitors of the expo started being built, some are still visible today. The profits from the Expo would also be used to finance the war, which at the time was expected to begin after 1942 or 1945. Again the modern projects submitted, featuring glass skyscrapers, were scrapped in favor of buildings with Roman elements, a city of arches and columns meant to convey the idea that "a people of conquerors and dominators had returned".

The Italian colonial architecture of the time also featured modernist and monumental buildings; for example the buildings in Skanderbeg Square in Tirana, Albania. The modernist buildings in Asmara (Eritrea) have been declared a UNESCO World Heritage Site. Sometimes these buildings utilized local materials and took inspiration from local architecture, blending local and Italian styles.

=== Early Nazi architecture ===
==== 1936 Olympic Games ====
Despite their differences, German National Socialism is often considered a form of Fascism, their architectures show similarities but also some differences.

The 1936 Olympic Games had been awarded to Weimar Germany in 1931, when Hitler came to power he decided to use the games for propaganda purposes. He made plans for the construction of a great sports complex in Grunewald named the "Reichssportfeld", with a brand-new Olympiastadion as its centerpiece. Hitler desired more grand and extravagant venues than those that had been proposed before the IOC in 1931 by Berlin's bid team.

On 14 December 1933, Hitler had the March brothers create a third design for an Olympic Stadium. This is the plan that was used, and contained not only the Olympic Stadium that would be built, but also other elements that were built such as the Olympischer Platz, parade grounds with the "Führerloge", the Olympic Bell Tower along the east-west axis the Coubertinplatz, and the swimming stadium placed on the north-south axis.

In late fall of 1933 demolition work began on the old Deutsches Stadion, and work commenced on the completion of the gymnasium that had been left half-finished since 1928. Construction took place from 1934 to 1936. Complying with Hitler's wishes, March was the stadium's architect for the majority of the project, though Hitler ultimately replaced him with Albert Speer as the stadium's architect.

March's stadium, modern in its aesthetics, did not match the Nazi's goal to use the Olympics to display themselves as an imperial power in the mold of the Roman Empire. March's design lacked the monumental scale and neo-classical architecture that were the core values of Nazi architecture. Hitler allegedly had even threatened to cancel the Berlin games altogether if March's stadium was not altered to his satisfaction. After being appointed, Speer designed a neo-classical facade for the stadium literally overnight to meet Hitler's satisfaction. Speer's design was used, and clad March's stadium's exposed steel frame with stone.

==== Nuremberg rally grounds ====
On 30 August 1933, Hitler declared Nuremberg the "City of the Reichsparteitage (Reich Party Congresses)".

The grounds were designed by Hitler's architect Albert Speer, except for the Congress Hall, which was designed by Ludwig and Franz Ruff. However, only Zeppelinfeld, Luitpoldarena, and the Große Straße were finished.

The project included:

- the Luitpoldarena, a deployment area
- the Luitpold Hall or "Old Congress Hall" (damaged during World War II, later demolished)
- the Kongresshalle (Congress Hall) or Neue Kongresshalle (New Congress Hall) (unfinished)
- the Zeppelinfeld (Zeppelin Field), another deployment area
- the Märzfeld (March Field) (unfinished, later demolished), a deployment area for the Wehrmacht (army)
- the Deutsche Stadion (German stadium) (only foundations were built), which was to be the largest sports stadium in the world
- the former Stadion der Hitlerjugend ("stadium of the Hitler Youth", today Frankenstadion)
- the Große Straße ("Great Road"), a (never-used) parade road

A "Haus der Kultur" (House of Culture) and a representative entrance portal towards the "Great Road" were planned at the northwestern end of the "Great Road", near the (new) Congress Hall.

The whole site is now a memorial maintained to commemorate the victims of Nazi repression. The Kongresshalle, Zeppelinfeld, and the Grosse Strasse have been protected monuments since 1973 as significant examples of Nazi Party architecture.

=== Rivalry between Italy and Germany ===
Important for the turning point in the style of Italian Fascist Architecture was the rivalry with Nazi Germany. The two countries chased and imitated each other in many fields, including that of architecture. It's impossible not to see the resemblance between the façades of the New Reich Chancellery (built between 1938-1939) and the Palace of Justice of Milan (built between 1932 and 1940), although the tribunal of Milan is much bigger and modern in style (simplified from its original, more elaborate project) it is unclear whether it influenced the design of the New Chancellery.

Around 1936 Italy designed a large rally ground called Arengo delle Nazioni to be built near the Mussolini Forum, about the size of the Zeppelinfeld in Nuremberg. Later the plans were revised, and it was said about the 1941 final plan: "Finally the Forum can compete with Nuremberg".

In January 1937 Hitler and his chief architect Albert Speer started designing the new Berlin, sometimes called Welthauptstadt Germania (World Capital Germania, similarly to the idea of Roma Caput Mundi). Hitler and Speer worked on a colossal scale, Piacentini would later go on to say: "the German meter is made of 1000 centimeters".

In September 1937 Mussolini visited Hitler in Munich, among other things the two dictators also talked about architecture. That same month, Hitler laid the first stone of the Deutsches Stadion in Nuremberg, which was never completed.

Hitler and Speer also visited Rome, Naples and Florence in Italy in 1938.

Like the E42, the new Berlin was designed to last hundreds if not thousands of years, and took inspiration from ancient Greece and Rome, Egypt, Babylon, and was meant to surpass Paris and London and Washington D.C. with its monuments. Another proof of the rivalry between Germany and Italy at the time is the fact that, while the rest of the plans for the new Berlin were made public, and Piacentini even dedicated a number of the magazine Architettura to them, Hitler told Speer and Goebbels to not show the Grosse Halle to Mussolini, for fear that he might copy it.

Doubts arose immediately about the stability of the terrain, the marshland which Berlin rests on. A test construction was built, consisting of a large and heavy block of concrete. The building sank by about 18 cm during the three years of testing, while the maximum acceptable value would have been 6 cm. This test demonstrated that the ground would hardly have supported the structures of Hitler's design without further preparations.

At the end almost no building designed for the new Berlin was built.

The 1941 regulation plan for Rome, "a project to leave people astonished" as Piacentini called it, is considered by some to be the response to Hitler and Speer's projects for the new Berlin, however very few pictures and documents about this project have survived.

== Style and purpose ==
Fascist styles of architecture are a branch of modernist architecture which became popular in the early 20th century. The Italian Fascist style was also greatly influenced by the Rationalist movement in Italy in the 1920s. Rationalist architecture, with the help of Italian government support, celebrated the new fascist age of culture and government in Italy. Some today consider it a second Italian Renaissance. The goal of Rationalism initially was to build according to the necessity, according to the function of the buildings, and rejected unnecessary things such as decorations. Later it evolved to reflect the ideal continuity with the Roman Empire and to celebrate Fascist achievements. Statues and high-reliefs also adorned Fascist buildings.

In Nazi Germany, the extremely large and spacious architecture was one way envisioned by Hitler to unify Germany for what he described as "mass experiences", in which thousands of citizens could gather and take part in the patriotism of community events, and listen to speeches made by Hitler and other Nazi party leaders.

Some of the buildings purposefully conveyed a sense of awe and intimidation through their size, and were made of limestone, travertino, marble and other durable stones in order to last for centuries and to create impressive ruins.

Hitler and Mussolini used this architecture as a source of propaganda to display to the world the strength, pride and power their regimes had but also to break ties with the liberal past; in some cases the buildings were part of the modernization process of the country or followed the need dictated by the economic models. In particular in Italy the idea of the corporatist city arose.

In other cases the buildings served the welfare programs of the respective regimes: in Italy, Fascism built public buildings such as thousands of Case del Fascio in every major town and city, which were the local Nationalist Fascist Party house and served various purposes including offering services to the population. There were also Case del Mutilato (houses of the mutilated soldier, to provide assistance to disabled veterans), Case della madre e del bambino (houses of the mother and the child, operated by the Opera Nazionale Maternità created in 1925 to assist the mothers in need), and more such buildings. They also built theatres, cinemas, both for propaganda and cultural purposes, sports buildings and large summer camps called "summer colonies", on the seaside and sometimes in the mountains, these were usually operated by the Opera Nazionale Dopolavoro and were used by the workers and children in their free time or holidays. Thousands of workers and children could thus afford vacations or to go to the cinema. Some of these summer camps remained operational after the war but most have been abandoned. Something similar was done in Germany by the Strength Through Joy (KdF) organization.

== Architects ==
Some prominent architects of the fascist period were:

- Marcello Piacentini – Piacentini was Mussolini's chief architect, he ended up being responsible for around half of the total architectural projects of Fascist Italy, and for coordinating most other architects. He notably worked on the EUR district, the Palazzo delle Corporazioni (Palace of the Corporations), Via della Conciliazione, the rectorate of the City of the Sapienza University, Victory Square in Brescia, Victory Square and Dante Square in Genoa with the 2 skyscrapers, one of which was the tallest in Europe for many years.
- Giuseppe Terragni – The most famous works of Terragni are the Casa del Fascio of Como and the Novocomum apartment building, examples of Italian Rationalism.
- Adalberto Libera – The most famous work of Libera is the Palazzo dei Congressi in the EUR district (Congress Palace).
- Luigi Moretti – His notable works include the Casa delle Armi (an academy for fencing and other sports) in the Foro Mussolini, and the unbuilt Arengario delle Nazioni rally ground. His style is strikingly modern and Rationalist.
- Enrico Del Debbio – His most famous works are the Stadio dei Marmi and other buildings in the Foro Mussolini, he also co-designed the Palazzo Littorio (now Palazzo della Farnesina).
- Vittorio Morpurgo – Notable works include the buildings around Emperor Augustus square, including the old museum of the Ara Pacis, the Museum of the Roman Ships of Lake Nemi, and more.
- Ettore Rossi – Notable works include the Post Office of Palermo, (1934-1935), functional public building with a large monumental presence, and the E42 Official Restaurant building, inspired by classic temples.
- Gio Ponti – famous Italian architect and designer
- Arnaldo Dell'Ira – Italian architect and designer
- Albert Speer – Speer was Hitler's chief architect, his notable works include the German Pavilion for the 1937 Paris Expo and for the E42 Rome Expo, the Zeppelinfeld, the New Reich Chancellery which suffered severe damage during WW2 and was later demolished, the Deutsches Stadion that was never completed, and the plans for the new Berlin, Welthauptstadt Germania, that were also never built.
- Hermann Giesler – he was commissioned to build Hitler's house in Munich, later he became General Building Inspector for the city of Munich and then Linz. Throughout the war, Giesler and Speer had several heated arguments about architectural styles.
- Paul Troost – he was also one of Hitler's favorite architects, he designed the House of German Art in Munich.
- Ludwig and Franz Ruff – they worked on the Nuremberg rally grounds, most notably on the Kongresshalle (Congress Hall)
- Pedro Muguruza – Spanish architect, notable work includes the Valle de los Caídos.
- Julián Otamendi – Spanish architect, notable works include the skyscrapers of Plaza de España, Madrid.
- Luis Moya Blanco – Spanish architect
- Porfírio Pardal Monteiro – biggest Portuguese modernist architect who designed public buildings and industrial buildings during the Estado Novo period

== Structures ==
A few of the notable fascist architectural projects of the 20th century include

- EUR, Rome (Esposizione Universale Roma) – Construction of the EUR began in 1936 in anticipation for Mussolini's World Fair in 1942 to mark the 20th anniversary of the Italian fascist era, the most important buildings were completed but the project was interrupted due to the war and the Expo never took place. Later it was also featured in the 1960 Rome Olympic games, which made the EUR district known to the whole world, and started a process of modernization of the EUR district which continues to this day
- Foro Mussolini - sports complex in Rome, also featured in the 1960s Rome Olympic games
- Palazzo della Civiltà Italiana – A famous edifice of the EUR
- Palazzo di Giustizia, Milan
- The City of the La Sapienza University of Rome
- Piacentini Tower, skyscraper in Genoa that was the tallest skyscraper in Europe for many years
- Palazzo delle Poste, Palermo
- Roma-Termini railway station (unfinished, later modified after WW2)
- Olympia-Stadion in Berlin
- House of German Art in Munich
- Nazi party rally grounds in Nuremberg (unfinished)
- Berlin-Tempelhof airport
- Deutsches Stadion – (unbuilt) the component of the Nazi party rally grounds Albert Speer designed and Hitler envisioned would host all the future Olympic games during the Third Reich
- Welthauptstadt Germania – (unbuilt) the plans to rebuild Berlin in a monumental stripped-classicist style

== See also ==
- Stile Littorio
- Rationalism (architecture)
- Nazi architecture
- Monumentalism
- Novecento Italiano
- Stalinist architecture
- ATRIUM
