= Goombah =

Slang term

Goombah is a slang term for people of Italian descent used in the United States.

== Etymology ==
Goombah and similar forms derived as an alteration or Anglicized spelling of the common Southern Italian familiar term of address, cumpà, the apocoped oxytone form of the word cumpari found in Southern Italian dialects and compare found in Standard Italian, which denotes a companion or friend.

It is therefore commonly used as a term of endearment roughly equivalent to "friend," "brother," or "comrade" among close friends or associates (generally males) in certain parts of Southern Italy, including Campania and Sicily, where it becomes cumpà or cumpari in the regional Southern languages. It has, however, also gained a less innocuous meaning even in Italy in certain criminal contexts, signifying an "accomplice," "cohort," "fellow criminal," or "partner-in-crime," though it is still mostly used among non-criminal Southern Italian males as a harmless address of affection.

Compare and the Southern Italian cumpà and cumpari ultimately derive from the medieval Latin compater, meaning "cousin" and, later, "godfather."

== Social connotations ==
With the arrival of Southern Italian immigrants in America, the greeting used among Southern Italian males, cumpà, became Anglicized as "goombah" or "gumba", and spread among non-Italian-Americans as a derogation, often implying its subject was involved in some degree with criminality or had connections to the Mafia.

Today, especially in Italian-American slang, "goombah" is a term for a companion or associate, especially a friend who acts as a patron, accomplice, protector, or advisor. When used by non-Italians to refer to Italians or Italian-Americans, "goombah" is often derogatory, implying a stereotypical Italian-American male, thug, or mafioso.

== Examples ==
In the 1950s, boxer/actor Rocky Graziano and Martha Raye used the term in the original sense for NBC's The Martha Raye Show.

In the Chrysler Presents A Bob Hope Comedy Special NBC TV program (original air date September 27, 1963), singer Barbra Streisand introduced Italian-American singer Dean Martin as follows: "And now here's America's number one goombah, singing his new Reprise hit 'Via Veneto', il signore Deano Martin."

Derogatory use of the term is portrayed the 1969 publication of Mario Puzo's The Godfather and the highly popular movie made from it, which contained dialogue such as "I don't care how many guinea Mafia goombahs come out of the woodwork" or, in the film, "I don't care how many dago guinea wop greaseball goombahs come outta the woodwork".

In 2016, U.S. Senator Mark Kirk used the term in reference to what he regarded as unqualified political hires at a veterans' nursing home: "Blagojevich's people ordered [Tammy Duckworth] to take on some political operatives and I would call them goombahs in the Anna Nursing home facility that she was in charge of", drawing bemused commentary for his "Sopranos throwback moment".

== See also ==
- Anti-Italianism
- Goomba
- Goomah
- Guappo
- Guido (slang)
- Paesano
- Sicilian Mafia
- Wop
