= Glossary of Mafia-related words =

This is a glossary of words related to the Mafia, primarily the Sicilian Mafia and Italian American Mafia.

1. administration: the top-level "management" of an organized crime family -- the boss, underboss and consigliere.
2. associate: one who works with mobsters, but has not been asked to take the vow of Omertà; an almost confirmed, or made guy.
3. bagman: a person or paymaster designated to collect or distribute illicitly gained money.
4. barone: a baron or landlord.
5. books, the: a phrase indicating membership in the family. If there is a possibility for membership, then the books are open. If not, the books are closed.
6. boss: the head of the family who runs the operation. The boss also gets points from all family business; also see don, chairman.
7. bridge: threat of death; e.g. "our former friend is walking across the bridge".
8. button or becoming a button man: a mafia hit man; or someone who has become a made man.
9. capo: the family member who leads a crew; short for caporegime or capodecina.
10. capo dei capi: "boss of all [the] bosses" is a phrase used mainly by the media, public and the law enforcement community to indicate a supremely powerful crime boss in the Sicilian or American Mafia who holds great influence over the whole organization.
11. captain: a capo.
12. cement shoes: a method of murder or body disposal, usually associated with criminals such as the Mafia or gangs. It involves weighting down the victim, who may be dead or alive, with concrete and throwing them into water in the hope the body will never be found.
13. clip: to murder; also to whack, hit, pop, burn, ice, put a contract out on.
14. code of silence: not ratting on one's colleagues once one has been pinched -- no longer a strong virtue in organized crime families. See omertà.
15. comare: literally "godmother" in Southern Italian slang, usually pronounced "goomah" or "goomar" in American English: a Mafia mistress.
16. confirm: to be made; see made guy.
17. connected guy: an associate
18. consigliere: the family adviser, who is always consulted before decisions are made.
19. Cosa Nostra (Our thing): mob term for the family or Mafia
20. crank: speed; in particular, crystal meth.
21. crew: the group of soldiers under the capo's command.
22. cugine: a young soldier striving to be made.
23. don: the head of the family; see boss.
24. earner: a member who brings in much money for the family.
25. eat alone: to keep for oneself; to be greedy.
26. Finook: homosexual. From the Italian word for fennel.
27. family: an organized crime clan.
28. flip: to become a government informant.
29. forget about it (often pronounced "fuggedaboutit"): An exclamation; as the title character explains in Donnie Brasco:
  "Forget about it" is, like, if you agree with someone, you know, like "Raquel Welch is one great piece of ass. Forget about it!" But then, if you disagree, like "A Lincoln is better than a Cadillac? Forget about it!" You know? But then, it's also like if something's the greatest thing in the world, like, "Minchia! Those peppers! Forget about it!" But it's also like saying "Go to hell!" too. Like, you know, like "Hey Paulie, you got a one-inch pecker?" and Paulie says "Forget about it!" Sometimes it just means "Forget about it."
30. friend: "a friend of mine" is an associate, "a friend of ours" is a made man.
31. G: a grand; a thousand dollars; also see large.
32. garbage business: euphemism for organized crime.
33. Golden Age: The days before RICO.
34. Goodfella: A member of the Mafia.
35. goomar or goomah: Americanized form of comare, a Mafia mistress.
36. goombah: an associate, especially a senior member of a criminal gang.
37. heavy: packed, carrying a weapon.
38. hit: to murder; also see whack.
39. initiation or induction: becoming a made man.
40. juice: the interest paid to a loan shark for the loan; also see vig.
41. kick up: give a part of the income to the next up in the command chain.
42. lam: To lay down, go into hiding.
43. large: a thousand, a grand, a G.
44. LCN: abbreviation for La Cosa Nostra.
45. lupara bianca: a journalistic term to indicate a Mafia slaying done in such a way that the victim's body is never found.
46. made man: an inducted member of the family.
47. make one's bones: gain credibility by killing someone.
48. mock execution: to whip someone into shape by frightening them.
49. mattresses, going to, taking it to, or hitting the: going to war with a rival clan or family.
50. message job: placing the bullet in someone's body such that a specific message is sent to that person's crew or family; see through the eye and through the mouth.
51. mob, the: a single organized crime family; or all organized crime families together.
52. mobbed up: connected to the mob.
53. mobster: one who is in the mob.
54. oath: becoming inducted as a made man.
55. Omertà: to take a vow of silence in the Mafia, punishable by death if not upheld.
56. one-way ride or taking someone for a ride: underworld for an execution method
57. outfit: a clan, or family within the Mafia.
58. old country: refers to Italy when used by members of the American Mafia
59. painting houses: murdering someone
60. pass: A reprieve from being whacked.
61. paying tribute: giving the boss a cut of the deal.
62. pinched: to get caught by the cops or federal agents.
63. points: percent of income; cut.
64. program, the: The Witness Protection Program.
65. rat: someone who turns informant, snitches or squeals after having been pinched.
66. RICO: Racketeer Influenced and Corrupt Organizations Act. Passed in 1970 to aid the American government in clamping down on organized crime activities, its scope has since been broadened to prosecute insider traders.
67. Ricchione: Slur/vulgarity for a homosexual male. Similar to maricón in Spanish.
68. sent for: to be ordered to a meeting with other mob members and being whacked.
69. shakedown: to blackmail or try to get money from someone; also to give someone a scare.
70. shy: the interest charged on loans by loan sharks.
71. shylock business: the business of loansharking.
72. sitdown: a meeting, esp. with another family.
73. soldier: the bottom-level member of an organized crime family who is made.
74. spring cleaning: cleaning up, hiding or getting rid of evidence.
75. straighten out, getting straightened out: becoming a made guy.
76. tax: to take a percentage of someone's earnings.
77. The Commission and the Sicilian Mafia Commission: two bodies, Italian-American and the Sicilian respectively, of leading Mafia members to decide on important questions concerning the actions of, and settling disputes within the Mafia.
78. This Thing of Ours (Cosa Nostra): a mob family, or the entire mob.
79. through the eye: a message job through the eye to say "We're watching you!"
80. through the mouth: a message job through the mouth to indicate that someone WAS a rat.
81. underboss: the second in command to the boss.
82. vig: Vigorish abbr. the house's or bookie's take in gambling or the interest paid to a loan shark for the loan; also see juice.
83. waste management business: euphemism for organized crime.
84. whack: to murder; also clip, hit, pop, burn, put a contract out.
85. wiseguy: a made man.
86. zips: is a slang term often used as a derogatory slur by Italian American and Sicilian American mobsters in reference to newer immigrant Sicilian and Italian mafiosi.
