= Hitlerbauten =

Nazi-era buildings in Linz, Austria

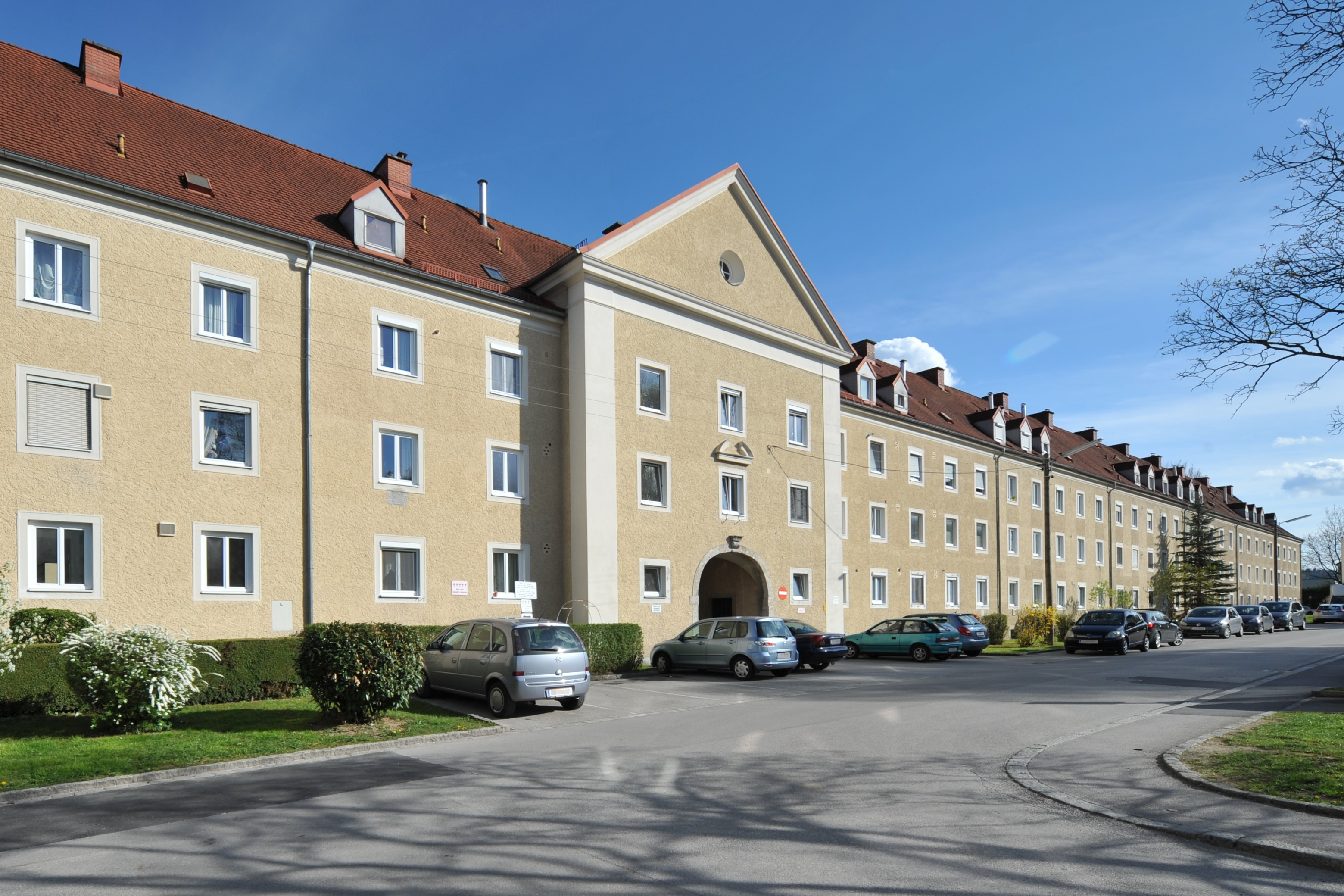
Bachlfeldsiedlung, Linz

Hitlerbauten or Hitler buildings are the residential buildings in Linz, which were planned or built during the time of National Socialism, Nazi architecture. Especially in the districts Bindermichl, Spallerhof and Urfahr, but also in other parts of the city numerous Hitler buildings were built. Also in other Upper Austrian cities, this designation is customary for residential buildings from the Nazi era, for example in Steyr-Münichholz.

== History ==
Residential construction is a consequence of the industrial settlement in Linz during the Nazi era, which aggravated the housing shortage that had existed since the interwar period. The population of Linz increased from 112,000 inhabitants in 1938 to just under 200,000 in 1945. At the same time 11,000 new apartments were built. For the construction work also forced laborers and prisoners of war were forcibly drafted and the material in the KZ-Mauthausen and subcamps.

Large courtyards with green areas are typical of the Hitler Buildings. In addition to the large housing blocks for the workers, which are architecturally the Heimatschutz architecture based on the shape of Upper Austrian square farmstead (Vierkanthof), also single and multi-family houses for senior employees, officers, etc. were built in settlements. The unfinished or war-damaged buildings were completed after the war.

The general planning was largely the responsibility of the architect Roderich Fick. The buildings were executed by various planners, such as Armin Sturmberger, Fritz Fanta, Herbert Rimpl and Hans Arndt as well as by Roderich Fick himself Buildings are listed buildings.

== Examples ==
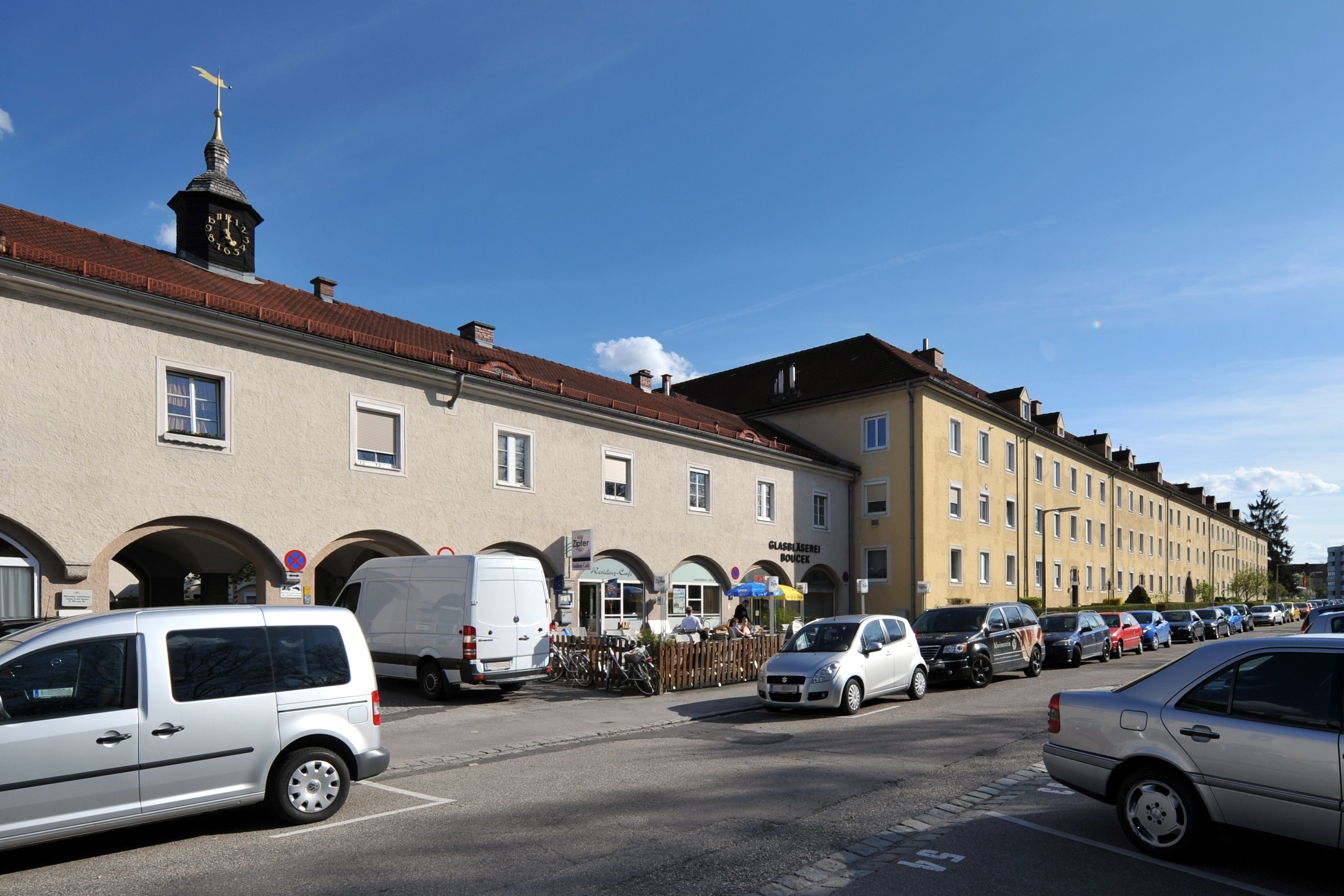
Harbachsiedlung, Linz

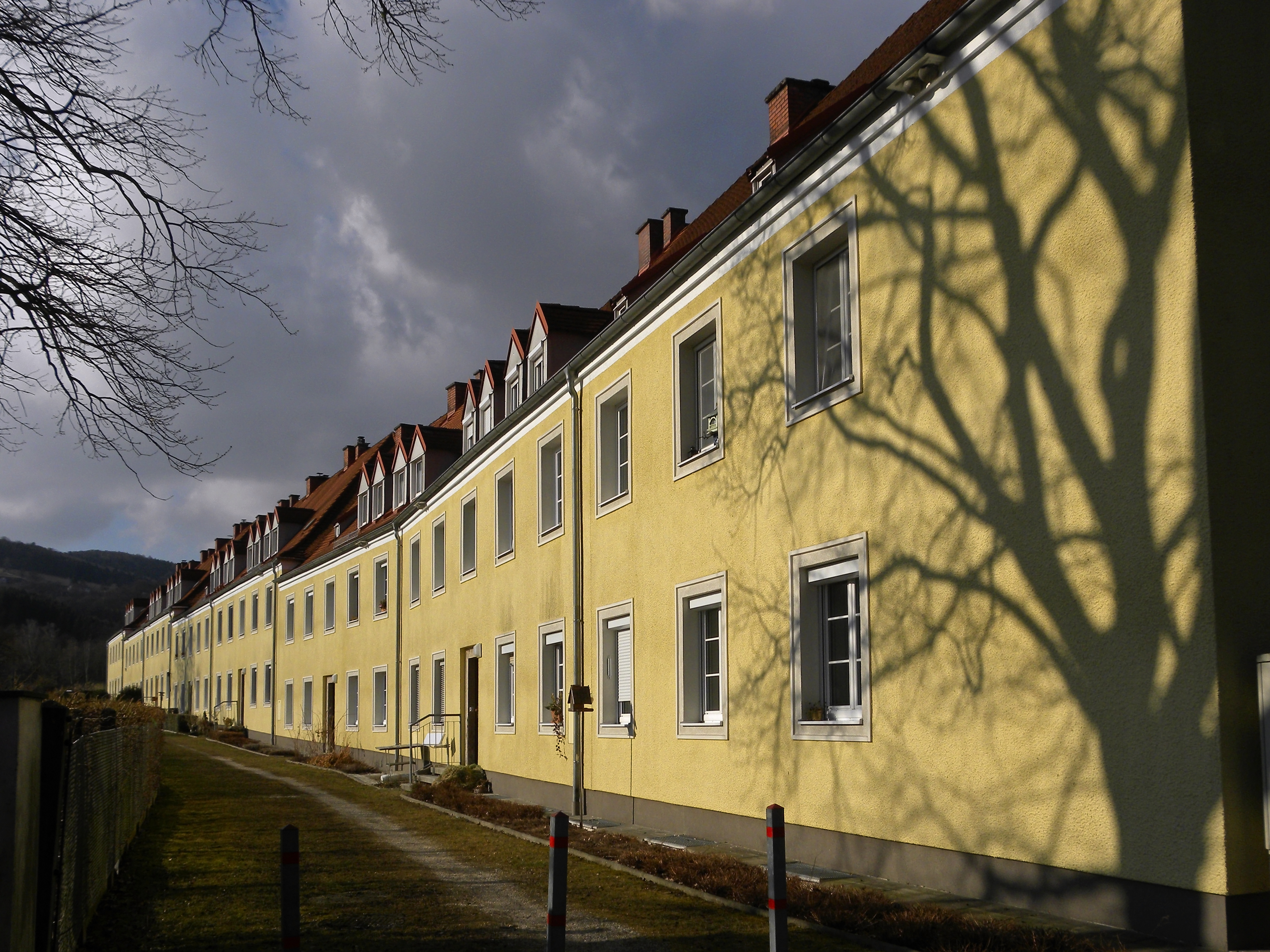
Gründbergsiedlung, Linz

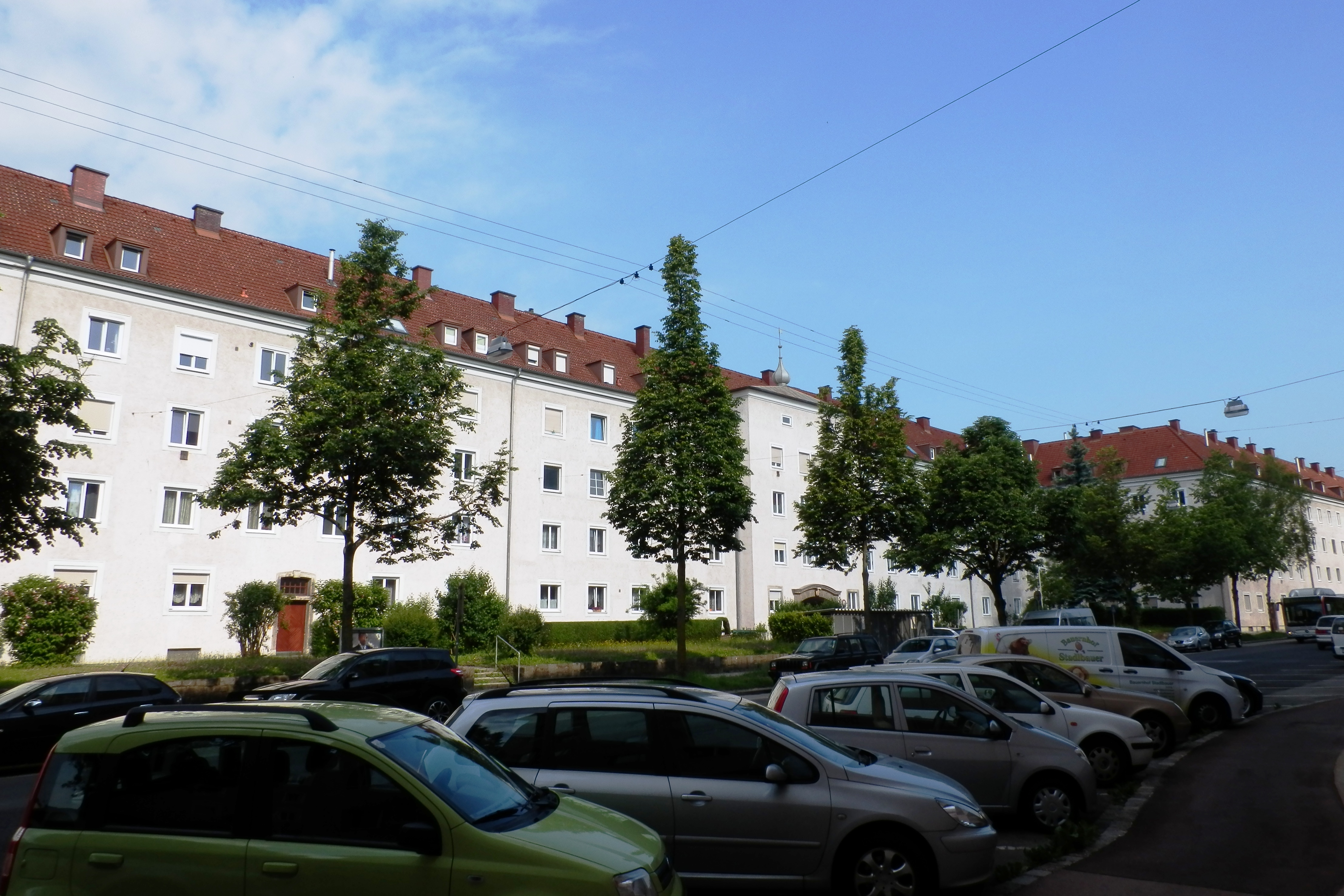
Karlhof, Linz

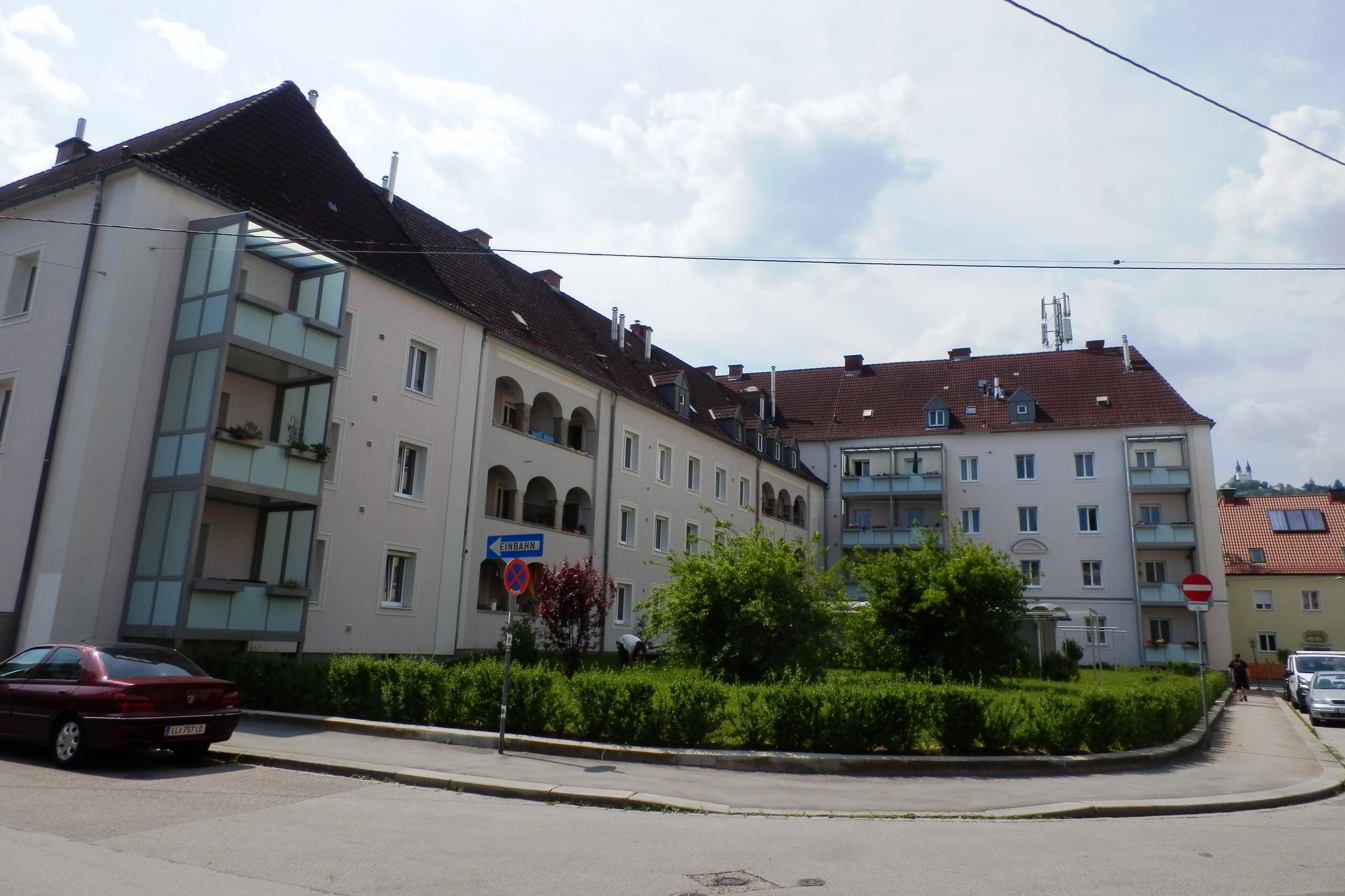
Auberg, Linz

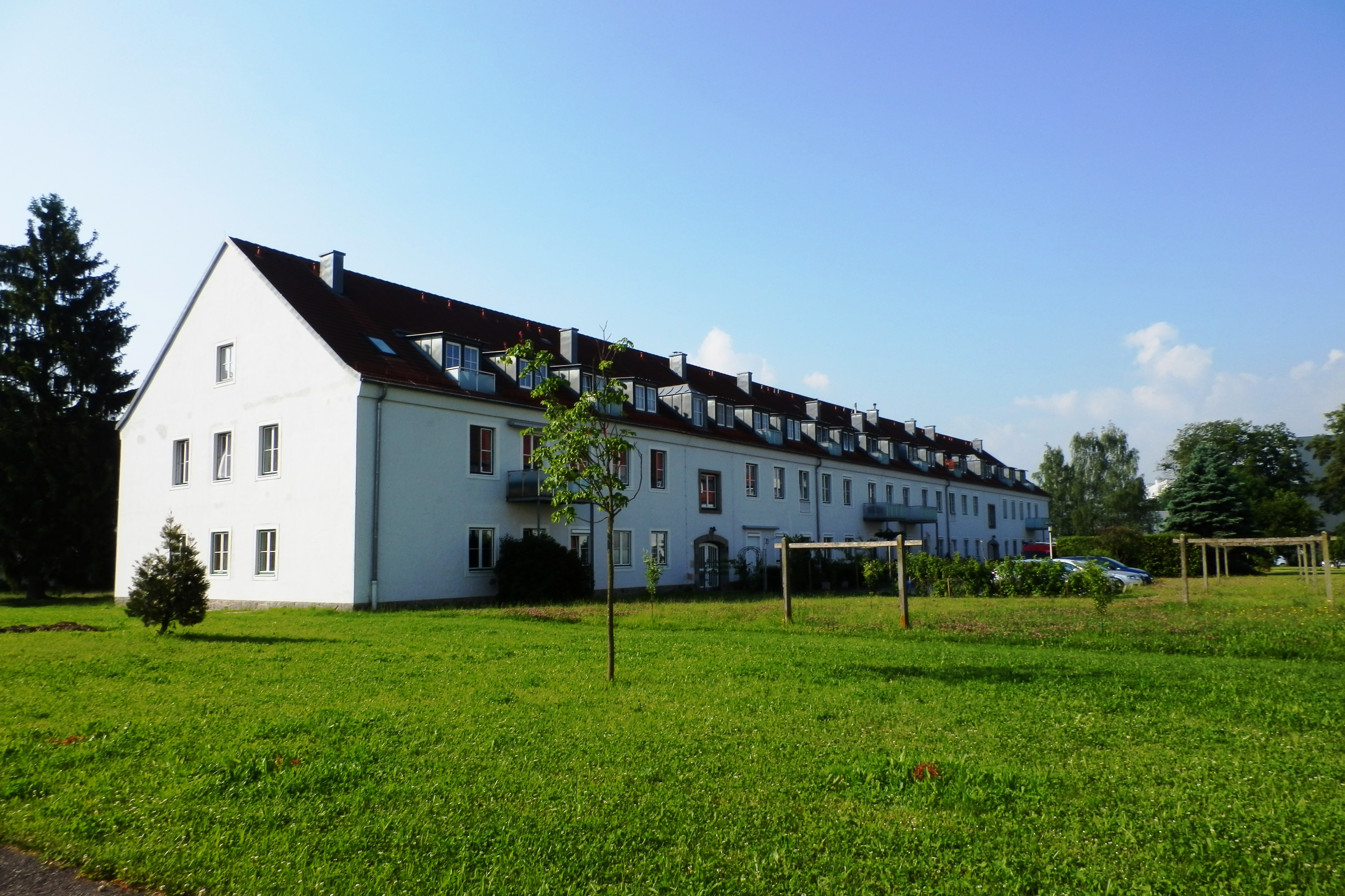
Auhof, Linz

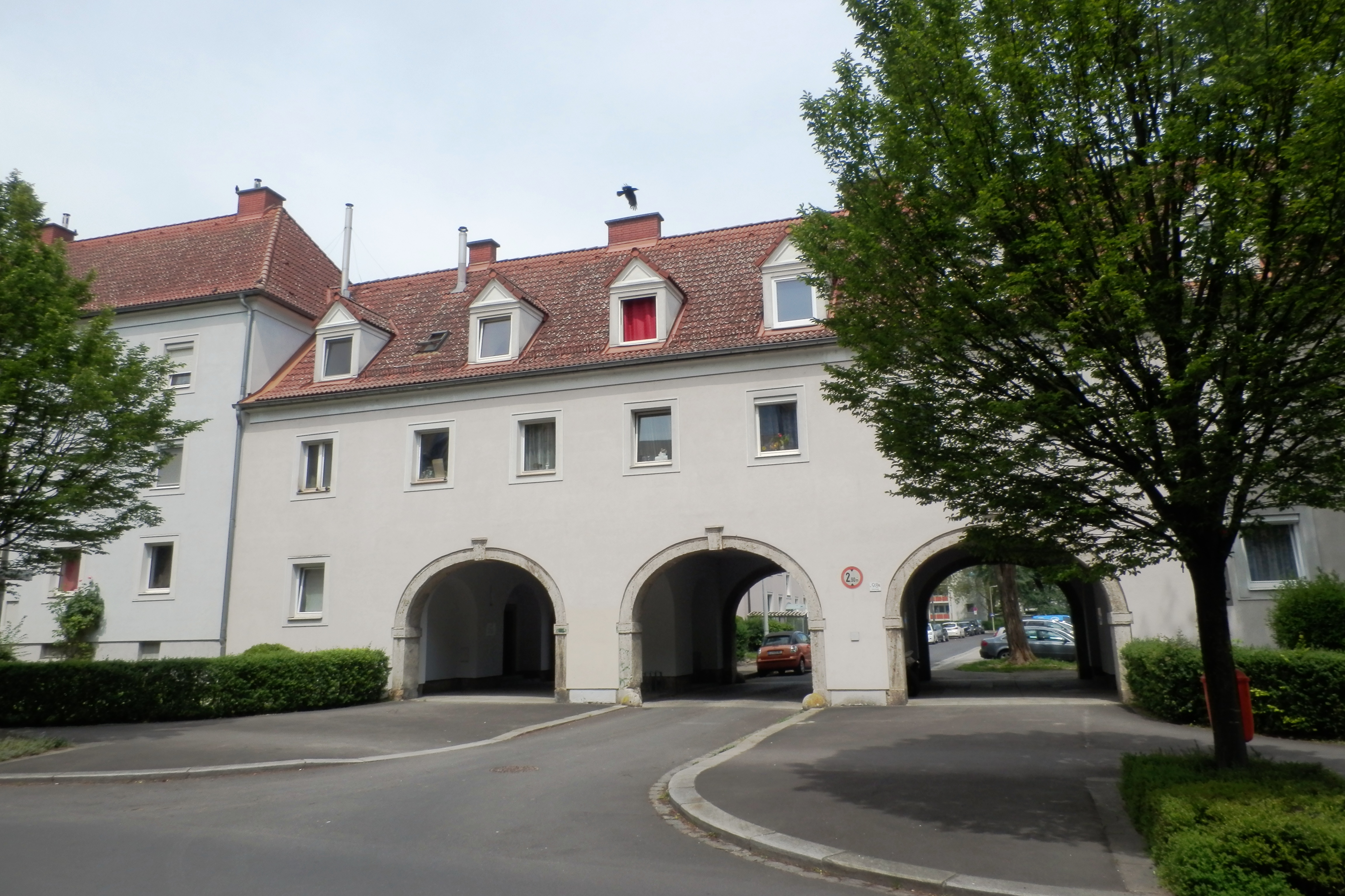
Neue Heimat, Linz

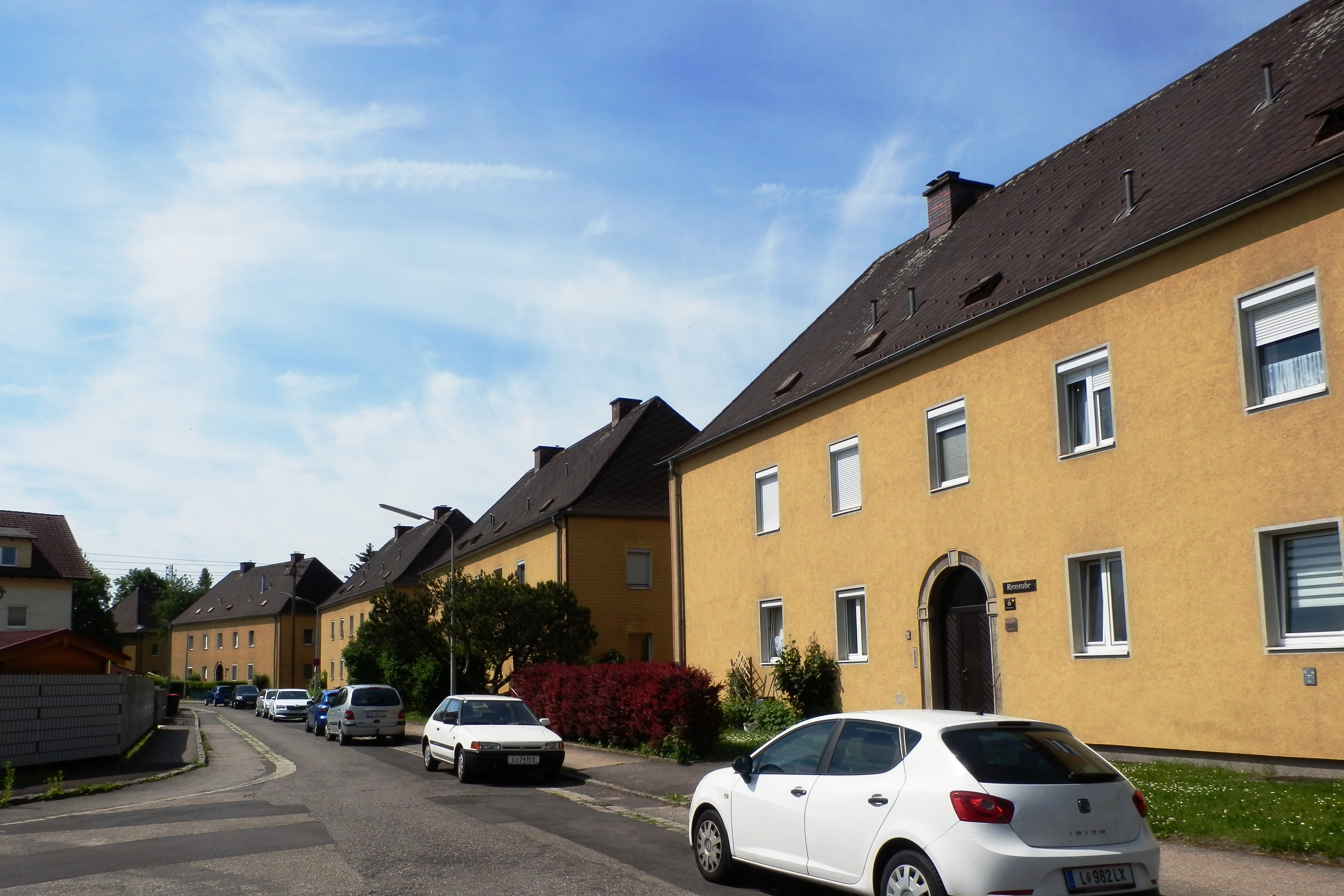
Kleinmünchen, Linz

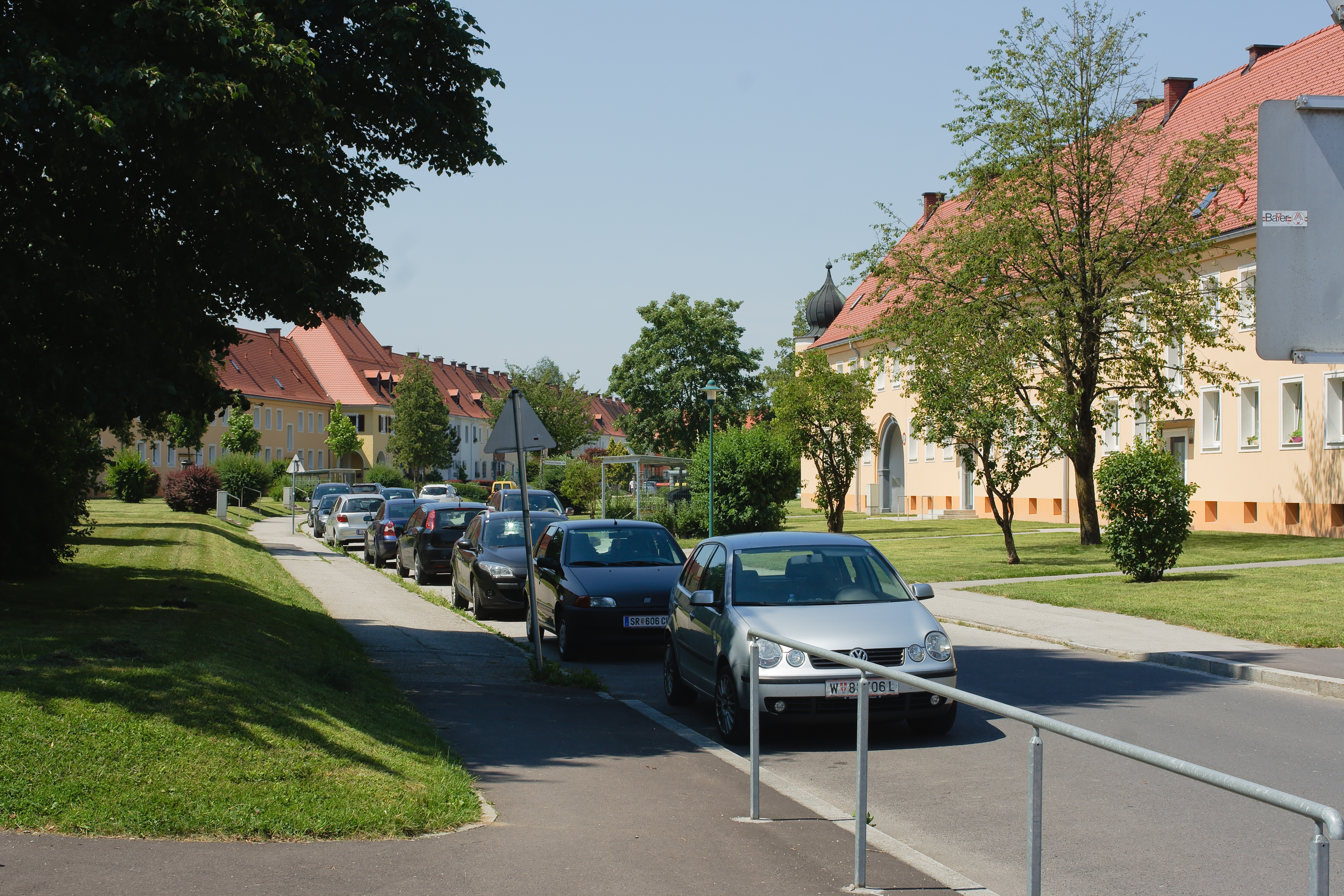
Münichholz, Steyr

== Bibliography ==
- Sylvia Necker, Elisabeth Kramer: „Hitlerbauten“ in Linz. Wohnsiedlungen zwischen Alltag und Geschichte. 1938 bis zur Gegenwart. Pustet, Salzburg 2012, ISBN 978-3-7025-0679-7. (in German)
- Günter Kaar, Manfred Carrington, Andreas Reiter: LiNZ-Zeitgeschichte – von der Provinz- zur Stahlstadt, Wohnen und Alltagsleben. Lentia, Linz 2012, ISBN 978-3-9503469-1-6. (in German)
