= Führer city =

Cities in Europe that were planned to be reconstructed by Nazi Germany

A model of the European Culture Center Adolf Hitler intended to be at the heart of a revitalized Linz; the facade of the Führermuseum can be seen at the center of the image, near the top, facing the camera.

A model of the planned Führermuseum, designed by Roderich Fick based on Hitler's sketches

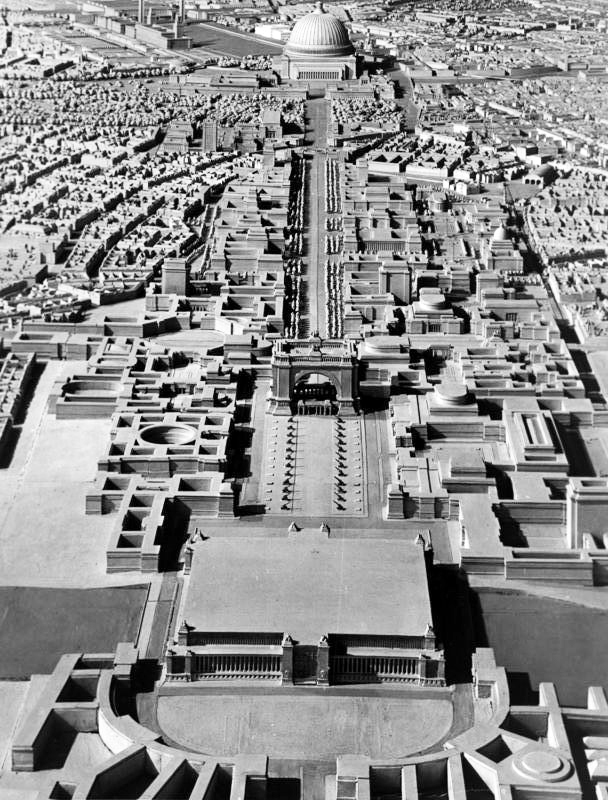
A model of Hitler's plan for Berlin formulated under the direction of Albert Speer, looking north toward the Volkshalle at the top of the frame

A Führer city, or Führerstadt in German, was a status given to five German cities in 1937 by Adolf Hitler, the dictator of Nazi Germany. The status was based on Hitler's vision of undertaking gigantic urban transformation projects in these cities, and executed by German architects including Albert Speer, Paul Ludwig Troost, German Bestelmeyer, Konstanty Gutschow, Hermann Giesler, Leonhard Gall and Paul Otto August Baumgarten. More modest reconstruction projects were to take place in thirty-five other cities, although some sources assert this number was as high as fifty. These plans were however not realised for the greater part because of the onset of the Second World War, although construction continued to take place even in wartime circumstances at Hitler's insistence.

After the Battle for France in 1940, Hitler ordered that the architectural reshaping of these cities was to be completed by 1950, and should represent the magnitude of the German victories in Western Europe.

== Designated Führer cities ==
The five Führer cities were:

- Linz:
  The town where Adolf Hitler spent his youth ("Jugendstadt des Führers"), and where he planned to retire after the war. Hitler wanted to turn Linz into a "German Budapest" – a city which, in Hitler's mind, then surpassed German cities of the Danube in beauty. Linz was to be "the new metropolis of the Danube," eclipsing Vienna, a city he hated.
  Linz was to expand three or four times from its then current size, with Reichswerke Hermann Göring providing jobs for the laborers relocating from Vienna. The bank of the Danube was to be built up with magnificent private homes, and a new "Hitler Centre" (Hitlerzentrum) was to be furbished with new community buildings.
  Major intended building projects were a Strength through Joy hotel, new municipal buildings designed by Hermann Giesler, a NSDAP party house designed by Roderich Fick, a Wehrmacht Headquarters, an Olympic Stadium, and "as a counter to the pseudo-science of the Catholic Church" an observatory representing "the three great cosmological conceptions of history – those of Ptolemy, of Copernicus and of Hörbiger." A new Gau house for Reichsgau Oberdonau was to feature a hall and a tower, under which Hitler's crypt was to be located.
  Monuments and buildings to commemorate the Anschluss and Anton Bruckner were also planned. A gigantic suspension bridge was to connect the banks of the Danube, which was to have a decorative frieze depicting the Nibelungen saga with monumental equestrian statues in pairs of Siegfried and Kriemhild and Gunther and Brünhild. The Führermuseum, featuring a 150-metre-long (490 ft) colonnade, was to contain the largest and most comprehensive painting collection in Europe, built around the art the Nazis had looted from Western Europe and stolen from rich Jews in Germany. The museum would anchor the planned European Cultural Centre.
- Berlin: see Welthauptstadt Germania
- Munich: the "Capital of the [Nazi] Movement"
- Hamburg: the "Capital of German Shipping"
- Nuremberg: the "City of the Reich Party Conventions"

== Other major building projects ==
In addition to the five cities decreed, there were plans to begin similar building projects in Königsberg, Oldenburg, Posen, Saarbrücken and Wewelsburg. At the influence of the Gauleiters, Hitler also greatly increased the number of cities that were slated for reconstruction by twenty-six additional ones not much later. According to a letter dated 19 February 1941 by Albert Speer to the National Socialist Party Treasurer, these were:

- Augsburg
- Bayreuth
- Bremen
- Breslau (Wrocław)
- Cologne
- Danzig (Gdańsk)
- Dresden
- Düsseldorf
- Graz
- Hanover
- Heidelberg
- Innsbruck
- Königsberg
- Memel (Klaipėda)
- Münster
- Oldenburg
- Posen (Poznań)
- Prague
- Saarbrücken
- Salzburg
- Stettin (Szczecin)
- Waldbröl
- Weimar
- Wolfsburg
- Wuppertal
- Würzburg

== See also ==
- Nazi architecture
- Nordstern (city)
- Honorary city titles in Nazi Germany
