= Julius Schulte-Frohlinde =

German architect (1894–1968)

Julius Schulte-Frohlinde (1894 - 1968) was one of Adolf Hitler's architects.

== Life ==
Schulte-Frohlinde was trained by Paul Bonatz and was part of his Stuttgart school. On the recommendation of Albert Speer, in 1934 Schulte-Frohlinde went to work under Robert Ley's German Labour Front (popularly known as the DAF, an abbreviation for Deutsche Arbeitsfront). The architect was named as the architect-director of the Schönheit der Arbeit (SdA, "Beauty of Work"), a DAF suborganization tasked to make workplaces more enticing to workers.

Schulte-Frohlinde developed and ran his own building department within the SdA beginning in 1936, and worked directly for the National Socialist government until its collapse in 1945, constructing DAF administration buildings, training schools, and helping to plan the Kraft durch Freude seaside resort called Prora on the German island of Rügen. The architect was openly anti-Semitic and unmistakably aligned with the goals and methods of the Nazis.

After 1945 Schulte-Frohlinde retreated to his hometown Bremen. In 1952 he became involved in the reconstruction of Stuttgart and withstood criticism from Bernhard Pfau, among others, for his political history and National Socialist aesthetics.

On the role of architecture in the reconquered east by the Nazis Schulte-Frohline wrote:

"We are fighting for Germany, for the maintenance and recovery of the soul of our people, which is mirrored most visibly in our craft and architectural culture (Gr Kultur)."

== Sources ==
- Werner Durth: Deutsche Architekten. Biographische Verflechtungen 1900–1970. Vieweg, Braunschweig u. a. 1986, ISBN 3-528-08705-6 (new edition Krämer, Stuttgart/ Zürich 2001, ISBN 3-7828-1141-0)
- Michael Flagmeyer: Die Architekturen der deutschen Arbeitsfront. Eine nationalsozialistische Kontrollorganisation als Planungsinstrument. 2 volumes. Braunschweig 2009 (Braunschweig, Techn. Univ., Diss., 2009)
- Michael Grüttner: Biographisches Lexikon zur nationalsozialistischen Wissenschaftspolitik (= Studien zur Wissenschafts- und Universitätsgeschichte. Band 6). Synchron, Heidelberg 2004, ISBN 3-935025-68-8, p. 155
- Herbert Heyne: "Umbau eines Einfamilienhauses in Berlin von Architekt Professor Julius Schulte-Frohlinde". In: Die Kunst. 88, 1943, pp. 124–128
- Anna Teut: Architektur im Dritten Reich. 1933–1945 (= Bauwelt-Fundamente 19, ISSN 0522-5094). Ullstein, Berlin u. a. 1967

== See also ==
- Nazi architecture
