= Woldemar Brinkmann =

German architect and interior designer

Woldemar Brinkmann (1890–1959) was a German architect and interior designer, he is associated with Nazi architecture.

== Biography ==
Woldemar Brinkmann was born on 12 March 1890 in Hamburg, Germany. From 1915 until 1923 he training at the Hamburg School of Applied Arts (now University of Fine Arts of Hamburg). He worked with Paul Troost on several projects including an unbuilt Opera House that would have seated 3,000 people, three times as big as the Paris Opera or Vienna State Opera.

Brinkmann was named in the 1942 Gottbegnadetenliste of Joseph Goebbels as an important artist of the German Nazi state.

Brinkmann died on 31 December 1959 in Hamburg, Germany.

== Literature ==
- Baugilde. Zeitschrift für die Deutschen Architekten – Baukunst, Bautechnik, Bauwirtschaft (i.e. The architect's guild. Journal for the German architects – architectural art, technology, and economics), 21. Jahrgang, Heft 2, 01/15/1939, page 43

== See also ==
- Nazi architecture
