= Wilhelm Grebe =

German architect

Wilhelm Grebe (born 1903 in Uslar-Schönhagen, died 1944 in Berlin) was one of Adolf Hitler's was architectural theorists.

Grebe worked as a civil servant at Reich Ministry of Food and Agriculture and was responsible for rural architecture. He noted that there were at least seventy different types of indigenous architecture in Nazi Germany and argued that in the future standardization throughout Germany might be necessary. The project never went ahead. Grebe also argued that the ideal roof pitch should be increased from 45 to 48 degrees.

Wilhelm Grebe was Editor of "Handbuch für das Bauen auf dem Lande", Berlin 1943. It shows the opinion how the architecture should have to be developed to create better agricultural technique in Germany including Austria and the occupied countries after 1939.

== See also ==
- Nazi architecture
