= Ruin value =

Concept in architecture

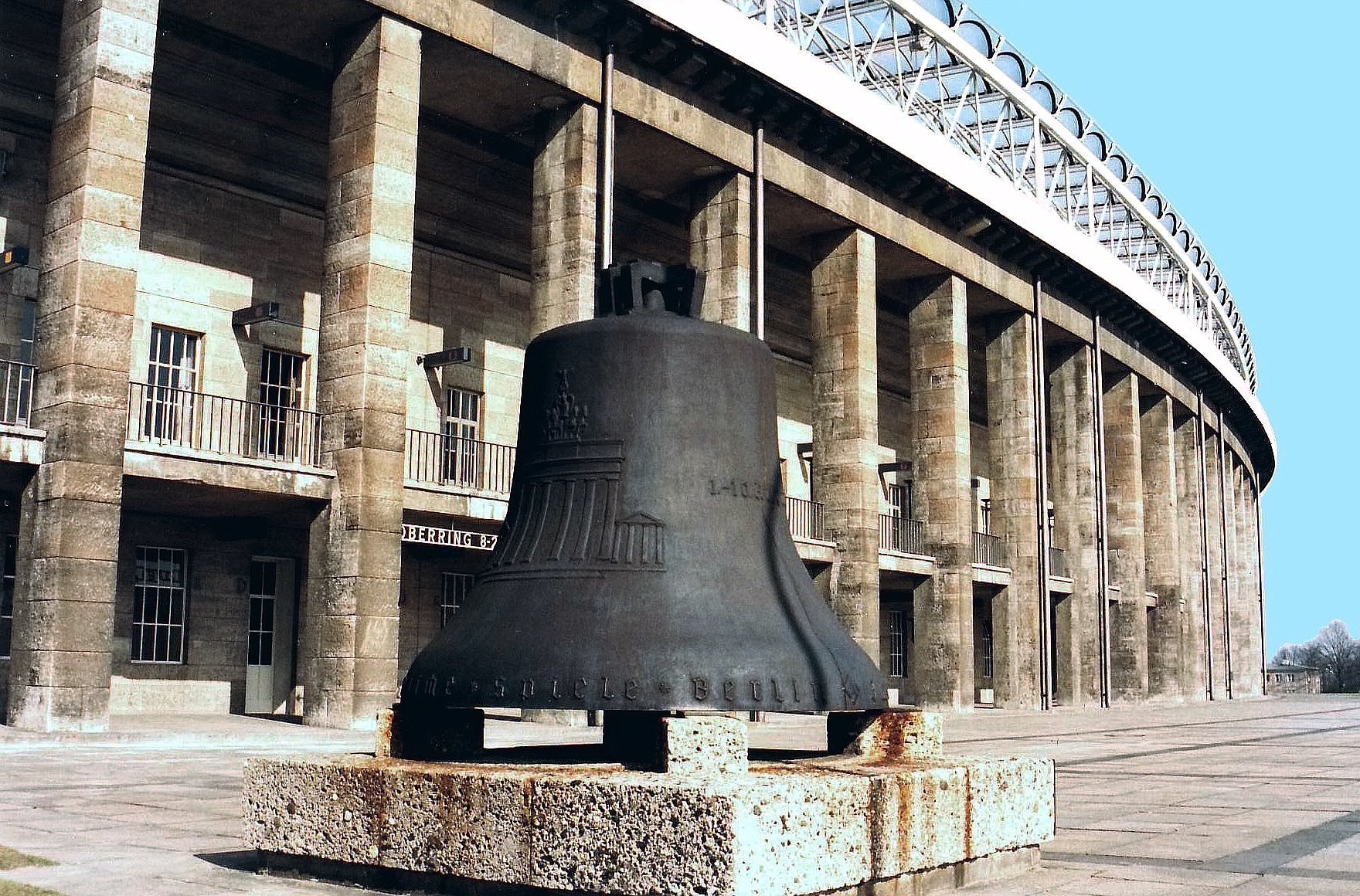
The 1936 Berlin Olympiastadion as it appeared in 1993

Ruin value (German: Ruinenwert) is the concept that a building be designed in such a way that if it eventually collapsed, it would leave behind aesthetically pleasing ruins that would last far longer without any maintenance at all. The idea was pioneered by German architect Albert Speer while planning for the 1936 Summer Olympics and published as "The Theory of Ruin Value" (Die Ruinenwerttheorie), although he was not its original inventor. The intention did not stretch only to the eventual collapse of the buildings, but rather assumed such buildings were inherently better designed and more imposing during their period of use.

The idea was supported by Adolf Hitler, who planned for such ruins to be a symbol of the greatness of the Third Reich, just as Ancient Greek and Roman ruins were symbolic of those civilisations.

== Albert Speer ==
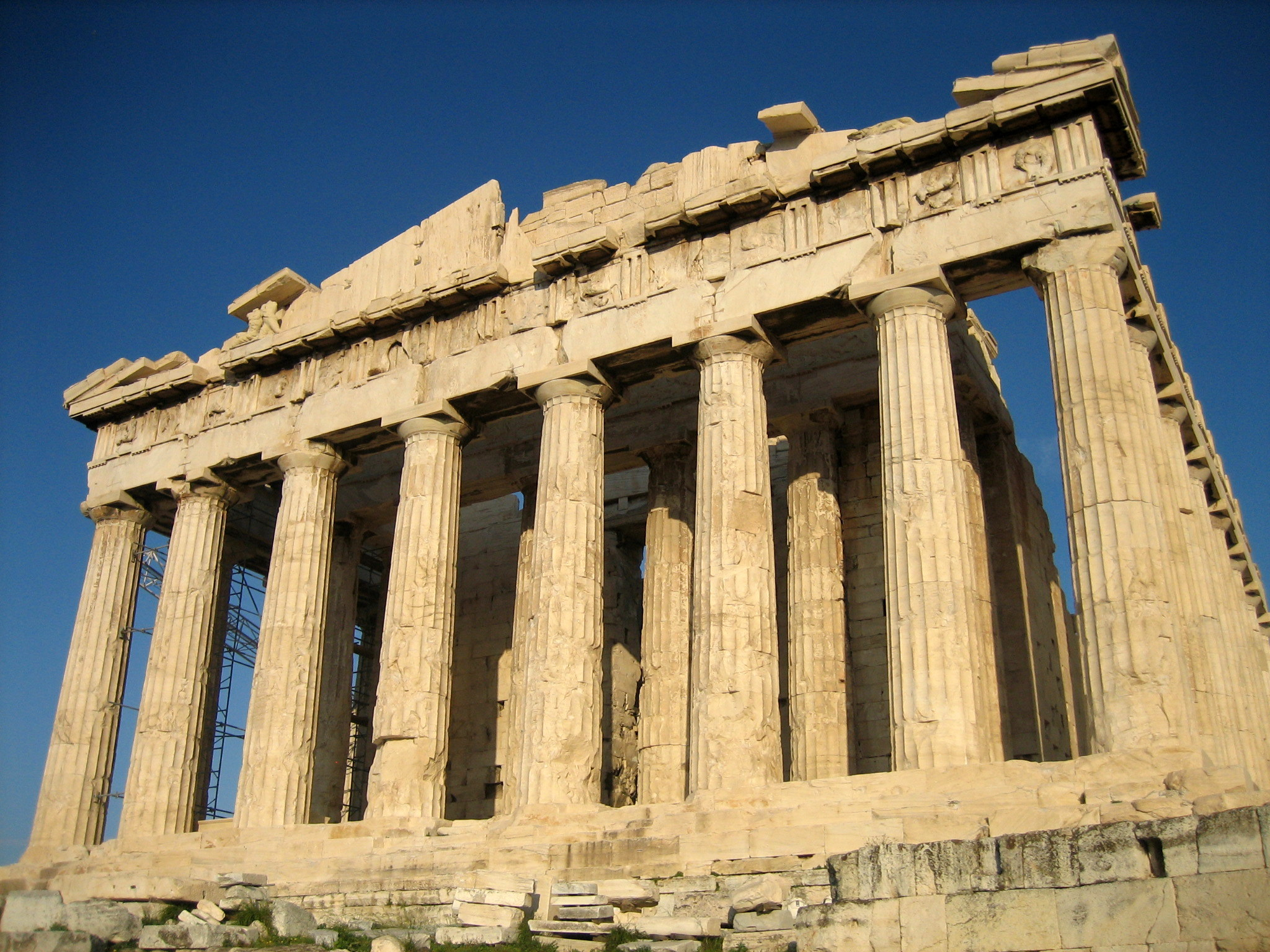
The Parthenon as an example of aesthetically pleasing ruins

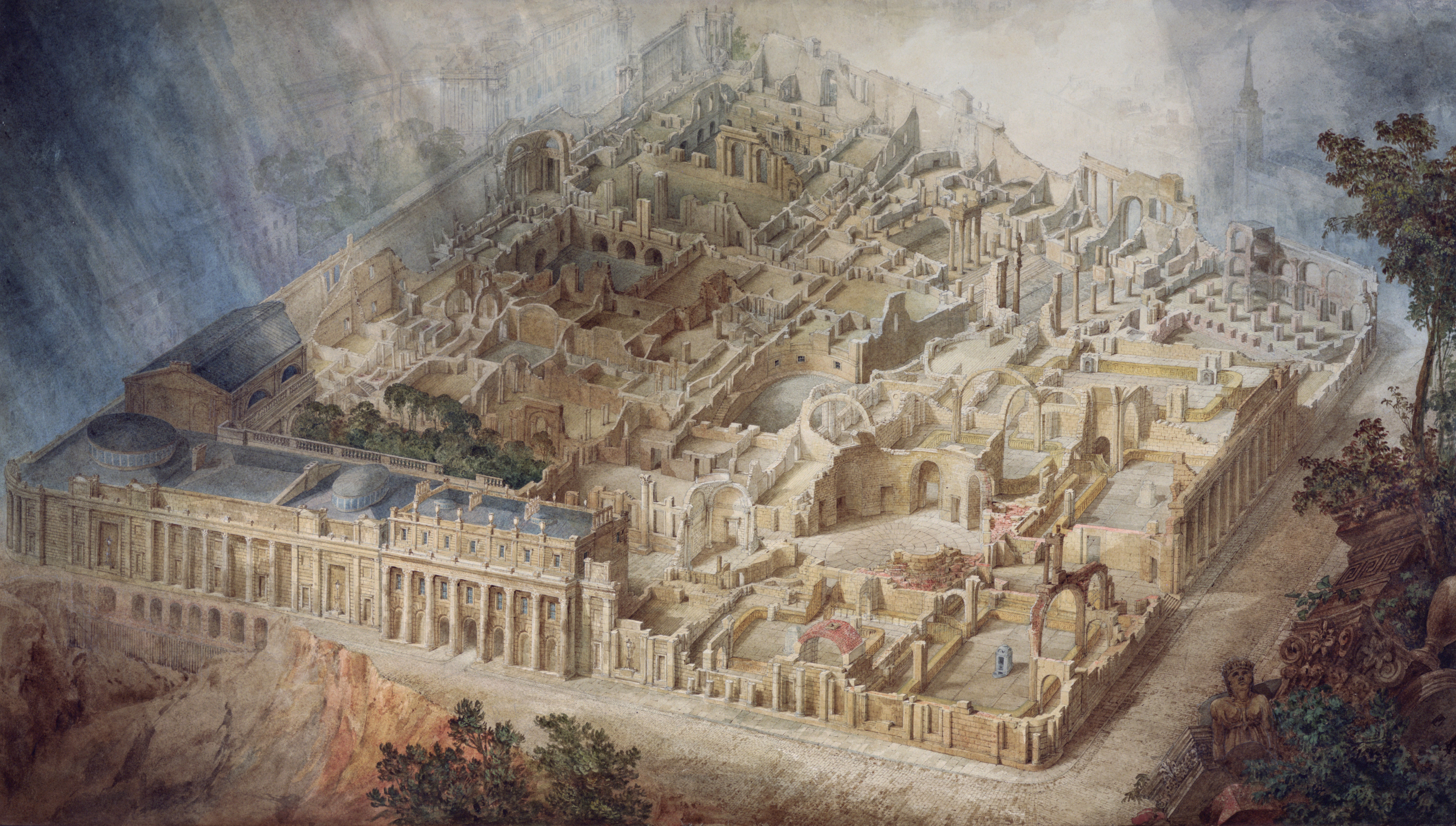
Aerial view of the imagined ruins of the Bank of England built by Sir John Soane (1830).

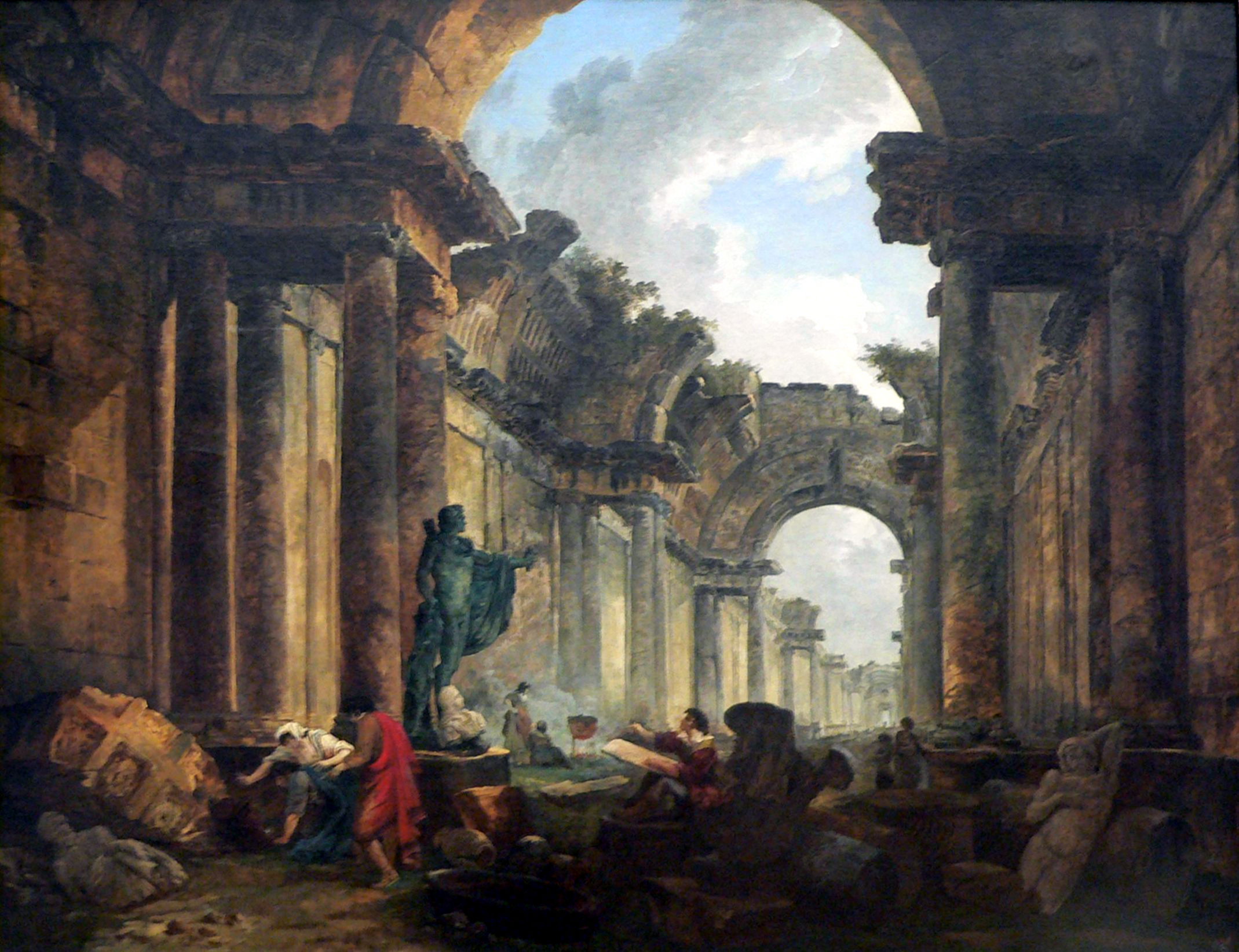
Imaginary View of the Grand Gallery of the Louvre in Ruins by Hubert Robert (1796).

In his memoirs, Albert Speer claimed to have invented the idea, which he referred to as the theory of Ruin Value (Gr. Ruinenwerttheorie). It was supposedly an extension of Gottfried Semper's views about using "natural" materials and the avoidance of iron girders. In reality it was a much older concept, even becoming a Europe-wide Romantic fascination at one point. Predecessors include a "new ruined castle" built by the Landgraf of Hesse-Kassel in the 18th century, and the designs for the Bank of England built in the 19th century produced by Sir John Soane. When he presented the bank's governors with three oil sketches of the planned building one of them depicted it when it would be new, another when it would be weathered, and a third what its ruins would look like a thousand years onward.

Speer's memoirs reveal Hitler's thoughts about Nazi state architecture in relation to Roman imperial architecture:

Hitler liked to say that the purpose of his building was to transmit his time and its spirit to posterity. Ultimately, all that remained to remind men of the great epochs of history was their monumental architecture, he remarked. What then remained of the emperors of the Roman Empire? What would still give evidence of them today, if not their buildings […] So, today the buildings of the Roman Empire could enable Mussolini to refer to the heroic spirit of Rome when he wanted to inspire his people with the idea of a modern imperium. Our buildings must also speak to the conscience of future generations of Germans. With this argument Hitler also underscored the value of a durable kind of construction.

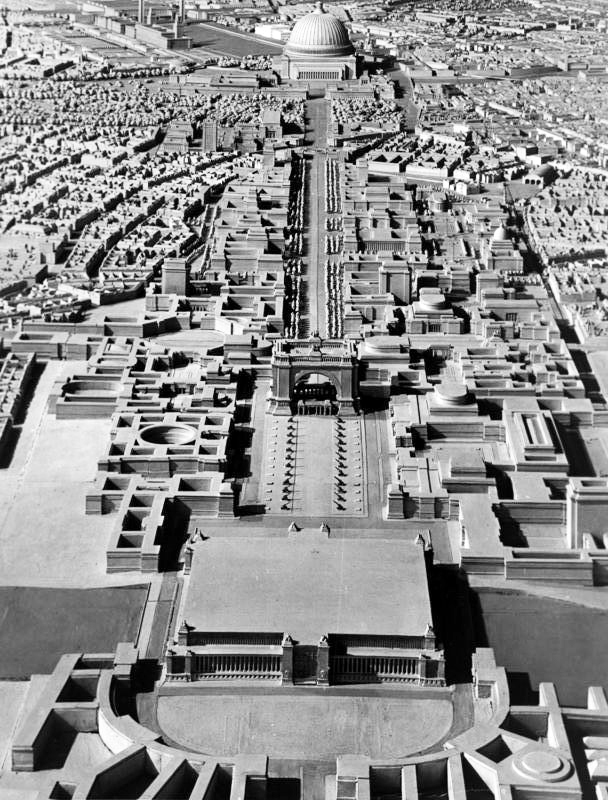
The model of reshaped Berlin.

Hitler accordingly approved Speer's recommendation that, in order to provide a "bridge to tradition" to future generations, modern "anonymous" materials such as steel girders and ferroconcrete should be avoided in the construction of monumental party buildings wherever possible, since such materials would not produce aesthetically acceptable ruins. Thus, the most politically significant buildings of the Reich were intended, to some extent, even after falling into ruins after thousands of years, to resemble their Roman models.

Speer expressed his views on the matter in the Four Year Plan of 1937 in his contribution Stone Not Iron in which he published a photograph of the Parthenon with the subscript: "The stone buildings of antiquity demonstrate in their condition today the permanence of natural building materials." Later, after saying modern buildings rarely last more than fifty years, he continues: "The ages-old stone buildings of the Egyptians and the Romans still stand today as powerful architectural proofs of the past of great nations, buildings which are often ruins only because man's lust for destruction has made them such." Hitler approved Speer's "Law of Ruin Value" (Gr. Ruinengesetz) after Speer had shown him a sketch of the Haupttribüne as an ivy-covered ruin. The drawing pleased Hitler but scandalised his entourage.

However, due to the onset of the Second World War, Nazi German architecture made extensive use of concrete.

== Modern planned ruins ==
A more modern example of intended ruins were the planned warning signs for the proposed nuclear waste repository at Yucca Mountain (see Human Interference Task Force), which were intended to endure for 10,000 years, and yet still convey an enduring (if negative) impression on future generations: "Keep out. Don't dig here."

Architect Charles Jencks mentions "Ruins in the Garden", a section of the Neue Staatsgalerie, as a postmodern subversion of ruin value.

== See also ==
- Fascist architecture
- Mausoleum
- Memorial
- Nazi architecture
- Time capsule
- Folly
