= Mausoleum in Wałbrzych =

Coordinates: 50°45′53″N 16°17′49″E

- Schlesier-Ehrenmal
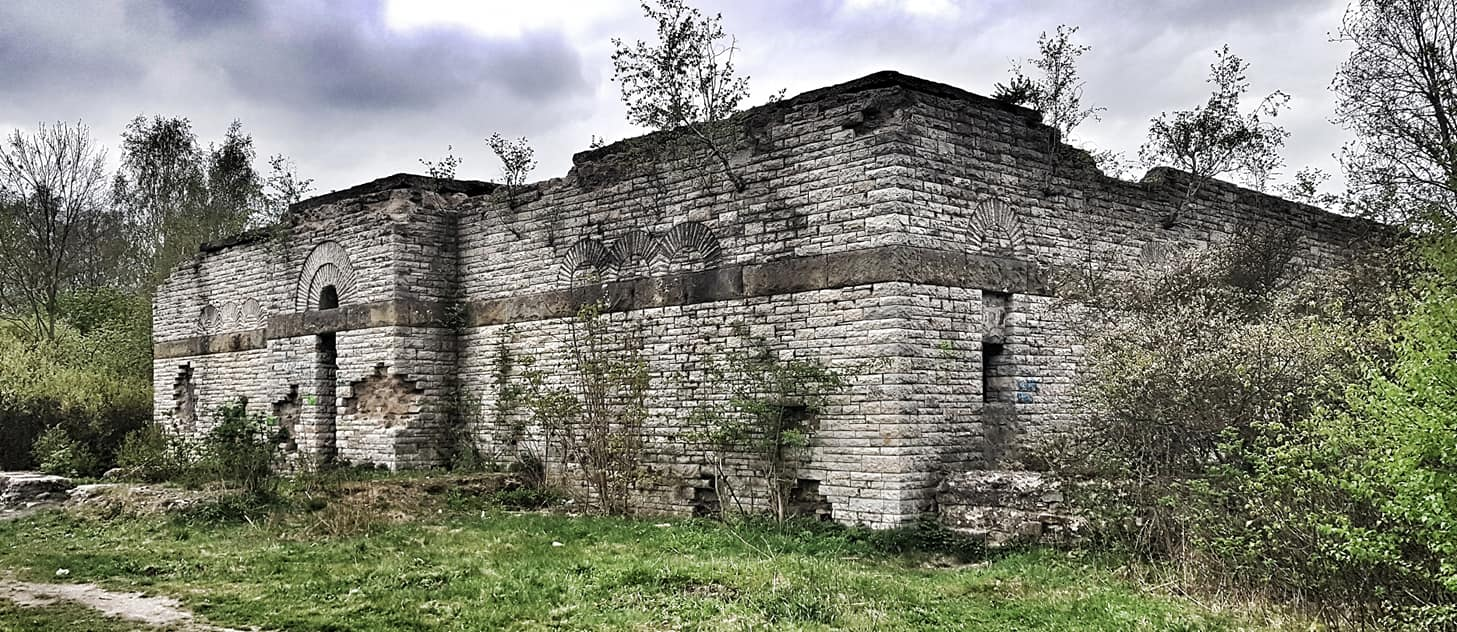
- Mausoleum in September 2019
- Interactive map of the Mausoleum in Wałbrzych area
- Alternative names: Totenburg (misnomer)

General information
- Type: Cenotaph
- Architectural style: Nazi architecture
- Location: Wałbrzych Poland
- Opened: 1938

Design and construction
- Architect: Robert Tischler
- Developer: Germany

The Mausoleum in Wałbrzych, Schlesier-Ehrenmal (Silesian Monument of Glory) is a cenotaph commemorating 170,000 Silesians who died during World War I, victims of accidents in mines, and 25 local fighters of the National Socialist movement. It represents the style of monuments commemorating the victims of the war, while being at the same time an example of a propaganda monument to glory, typical of the monumental architecture of the Third Reich.

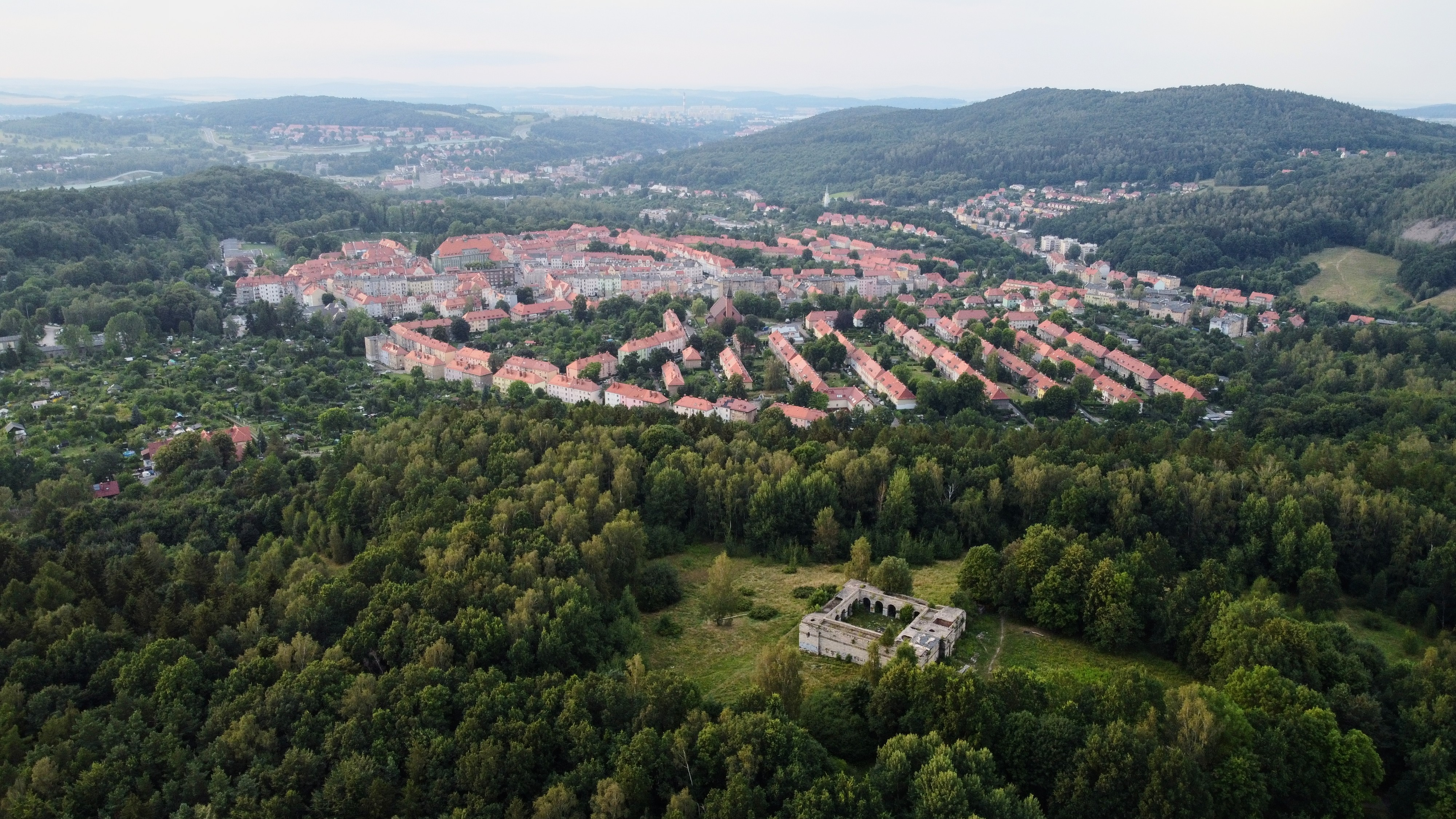
Mausoleum visible in the lower part of the photo

== Location ==
The building is located east of the center of Wałbrzych (Waldenburg), on the northern slope of Mount Niedźwiadki, commonly called the 5th Festival Hill, by the blue tourist trail and the red walking trail, at an elevation of approximately 510 to 530 m.

== History ==
The main idea was to be a monument commemorating the inhabitants of the region who died during World War I and victims of mining accidents, but because the Nazis had no social support in this area(cn) (The inhabitants of Waldenburg did not come in crowds during Hitler's visit in 1932, and therefore they brought supporters from other regions.) 25 NSDAP militants were added. This emphasized that the soldiers, working people and fighters of the Nazi movement had an equal share in shaping the Nazi state.

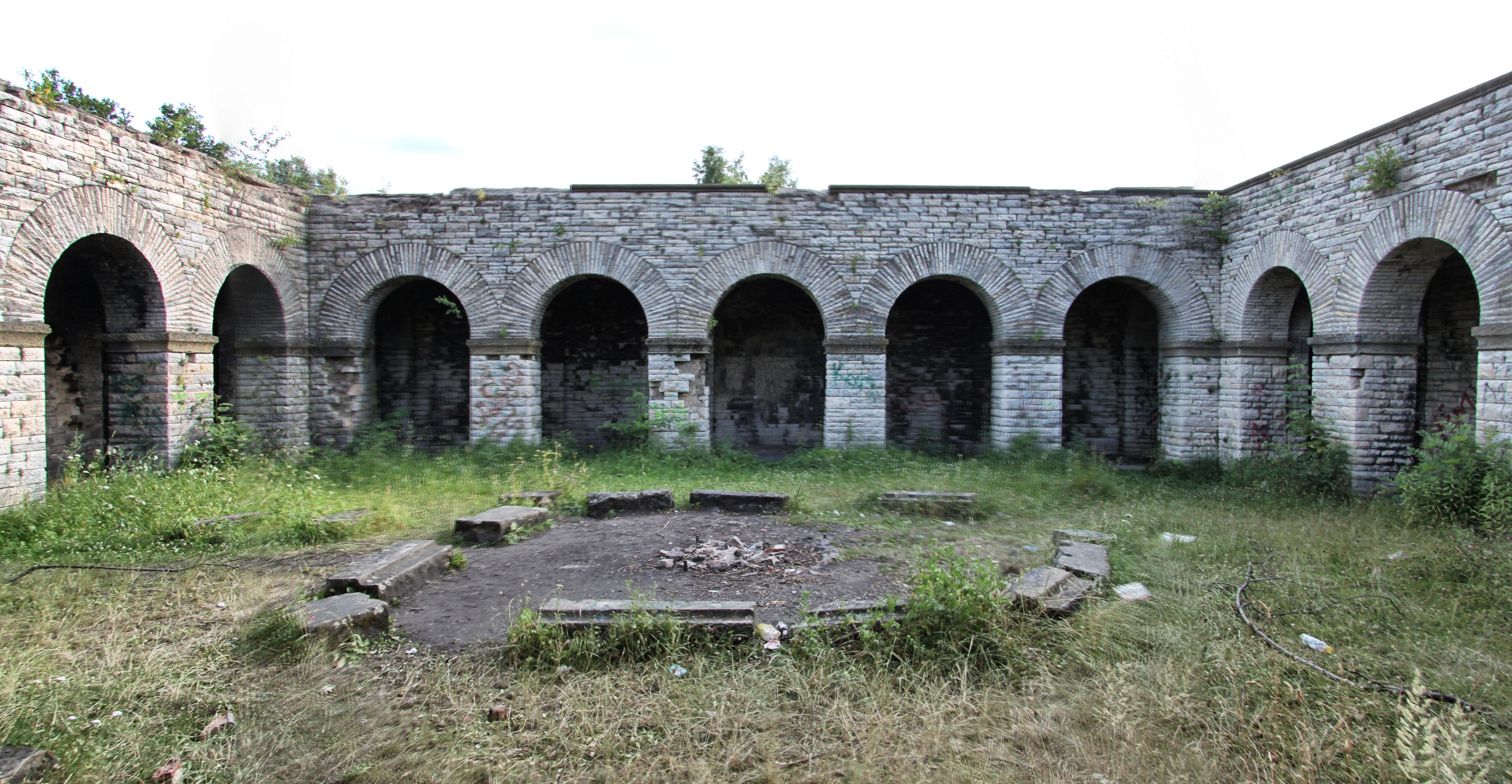
Courtyard of the Mausoleum

The mausoleum in Waldenburg was built from 1936 to 1938 based on a design by Robert Tischler at the initiative of the People's Union for the Protection of German War Graves (VDK). It was made by companies from Waldenburg and stonemasons, who also worked on the construction of the mausoleum at Mount Saint Anna.

== Architecture ==
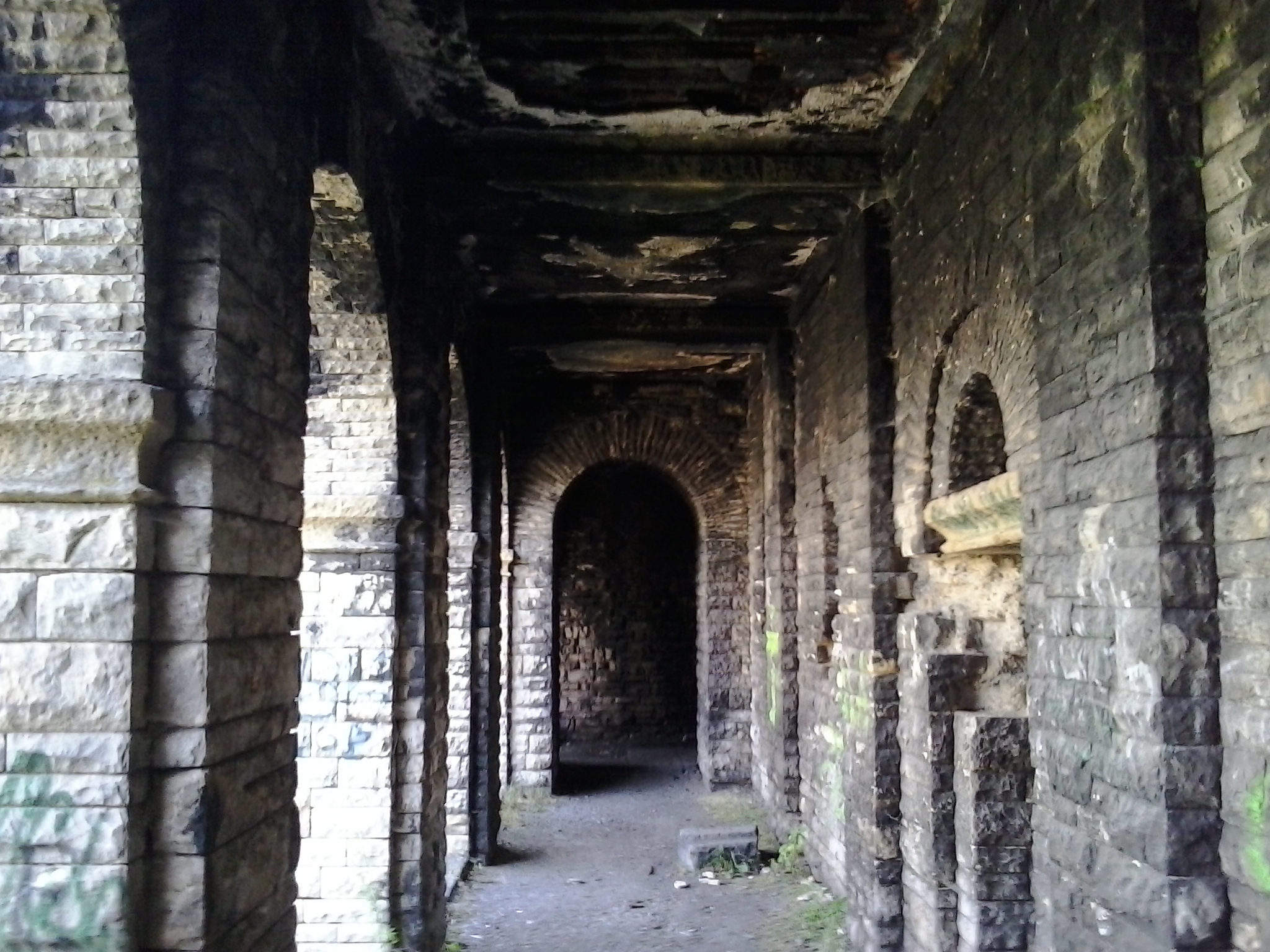
Cloisters of the mausoleum

The structure is in the shape of a quadratic fortalice with dimensions of 24 × 27 meters and 6 meters high. The massive structure resembles ancient Mesopotamian buildings. The portico and the cloisters had a basement. On the sides there are small square mastabas, topped with sculptures of eagles taking flight, resting on stone balls with swastikas. In the center of the courtyard there was a metal column with a torch designed by Ernst Geiger and cast in the Würtembergische Metallwarenfabrik Geislingen-Steige factory. On the pedestal there were four lions with their mouths open, inspired by the sculpture of the Brunswick Lion. The column was decorated with a net ornament and oak leaves, and the torch was supported by sculptures of three naked young men. In front of the mausoleum there was a parade ground with flagpoles.

== Bibliography ==
- Dorota Grygiel: Schlesier Ehrenmal – in memory of the Silesians in Wałbrzych (Digitalisat)
- Janusz L. Dobesz: Wrocławska architektura spod znaku swastyki na tle budownictwa III Rzeszy, Wrocław 1999
- Krzysztof Krzyżanowski, Tomasz Jurek, Wałbrzyskie Mauzoleum, "Odkrywca", 10/2019, str. 42-50.
