= Honorary city titles in Nazi Germany =

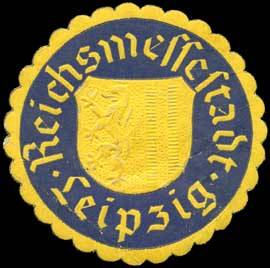
Sealing stamp of Reichsmessestadt - Leipzig

In Nazi Germany, the state gave a number of honorary titles to certain German cities. Not included in this list is the Polish city of Zamość, which, in 1942, was planned to be renamed Himmlerstadt, after Heinrich Himmler.

The following cities were given an honorary title during 1933–1939:

| City | Honorary title | In English | Since | Note |
|---|---|---|---|---|
| Berlin-Friedrichshain | Horst-Wessel-Stadt | "Horst Wessel City" | 1933 | |
| Braunschweig | Die deutsche Siedlungsstadt | "German Settlement City" | | Self-assigned title. Name refers to the 'model settlement' of the German Labour Front located in Mascherode. |
| Bremen | Stadt der Kolonien Hauptstadt der deutschen Schiffahrt | "City of the Colonies" "Capital of German Shipping" | 1933 | Shared with the city of Hamburg, see below. |
| Chemnitz | Hauptstadt der deutschen Industrie | "Capital of German Industry" | 1933 | Shared with the city of Essen, see below. |
| Coburg | Erste nationalsozialistische Stadt Deutschlands | "First National Socialist City of Germany" | 1939 | Coburg was the first German city in which the NSDAP won the absolute majority of the popular votes during municipal elections. |
| Cologne | Hauptstadt des deutschen Handels | "Capital of German Trade" | 1933 | Shared with the city of Leipzig, see below. |
| Essen | Hauptstadt der deutschen Industrie | "Capital of German Industry" | 1933 | Shared with the city of Chemnitz, see above. |
| Frankfurt am Main | Stadt des deutschen Handwerks | "City of German Crafts" | 1935 | See Friedrich Krebs (mayor) |
| Goslar | Reichsbauernstadt | "Reich Peasant City" | 1936 | Contained the headquarters of the Reichsnährstand, an organisation controlling German food production. |
| Graz | Stadt der Volkserhebung | "City of the Popular Uprising" | 25 July 1938 | Given because of pre-Anschluss pro-Nazi demonstrations. |
| Hamburg | Hauptstadt der deutschen Schiffahrt | "Capital of German Shipping" | 1933 | Shared with the city of Bremen, see above. |
| Innsbruck | Stadt der deutschen Bergsteiger | "City of the German Mountaineers" | | |
| Landsberg am Lech | Stadt der Jugend | "City of the Youth" | 1937 | Important in Nazi mythology as the site of Hitler's imprisonment in 1924. |
| Leipzig | Reichsmessestadt Hauptstadt des deutschen Handels | "Reich Fair City" "Capital of German Trade"" | 20 December 1937 1933 | Shared with the city of Cologne, see above. |
| Linz | First: Jugendstadt des Führers; Heimatstadt des Führers | First: "Youth City of the Führer" "Home City of the Führer" | | Adolf Hitler spent much of his youth in Linz, and continued to consider it his home town for the rest of his life. |
| Linz | Later: Gründungsstadt des Großdeutschen Reichs Patenstadt des Führers | Later: "City of the Founding of the Greater German Reich" "Patronage City of the Führer" | 1938 | The law which formally legalized the incorporation of Austria into the German Reich was signed in Linz on 13 March 1938 by Hitler and Arthur Seyss-Inquart, then-Chancellor of the Austrian Republic. |
| Munich | Hauptstadt der deutschen Kunst Hauptstadt der Bewegung Merged title: Hauptstadt der Bewegung und Hauptstadt der deutschen Kunst | "Capital of German Art" "Capital of the Movement" Merged title: "Capital of the Movement and Capital of German Art" | 1933 1935 1938 | "The Movement" meaning the Nazi Party, which was founded and headquartered in Munich. The dual titles were merged into one according to a May 1938 Hitler decree |
| Neumarkt in der Oberpfalz | Dietrich-Eckart-Stadt | "Dietrich Eckart City" | | Poet and founder of the DAP, predecessor of the Nazi Party. |
| Nuremberg | Stadt der Reichsparteitage | "City of the Reich Party Conventions" | 7 July 1936 | Center of the annual Nuremberg Rallies) |
| Salzgitter | Officially: Stadt der Hermann-Göring-Werke Informally: Hermann-Göring-Stadt | Officially: "City of the Hermann-Göring-Werke" Informally: "Hermann Göring City" | | |
| Soest | Stadt des deutschen Mittelalters | "City of the German Middle Ages" | | |
| Stuttgart | Stadt der Auslandsdeutschen | "City of the Germans Abroad" | 1936 | |
| Wels | Stadt der Bewegung Patenstadt von Hermann Göring | "City of the Movement" "Patronage City of Hermann Göring" | | |
| Wolfsburg | Stadt des KdF-Wagens | "City of the KdF Car" | 1938 | Unlike the other cities on this list which were merely assigned these honorary titles, Wolfsburg was actually founded under the name Stadt des KdF-Wagens bei Fallersleben, not acquiring its modern name until the post-war denazification process after the Third Reich's defeat in 1945. |

== See also ==
- German World War II strongholds, so-called Festung ("fortress") cities of Nazi Germany.
- Führerstadt
- List of streets named after Adolf Hitler
