= Urban planning in Nazi Germany =

Urban planning in Nazi Germany, the urban design and planning concepts used and promoted by the Third Reich (1933–1945), was heavily influenced by modernist planning and involved totalitarian methods to enforce Nazi ideology on its native and conquered populations.

== History ==
External videos
- Berlin 1936 (in color, OV with english subtitles)

The rise of the Nazi Party to power in 1933 brought about significant changes in the direction of architecture and urban planning in Germany. New political and administrative entities, formed to govern territories occupied between 1938 and 1942, had spatial and urban planning as core features. Albert Speer, Hitler's chief architect, applied his skills to design and construct buildings and cities in support of the Nazi ideology.

=== Generalsiedlungsplanung Ost ===
The Generalsiedlungsplanung Ost (General Settlement Plan East) formed part of the comprehensive Generalplan Ost (Masterplan East), intended to implement widespread genocide and replace non-German culture with Nazi ideology. The General Settlement Plan emerged to practically apply planning and architecture in support of the Masterplan's implementation. This involved using planning tools to apply the ideas advocated through Lebensraum policies to create 'living space' for the German nation.

== Purpose ==
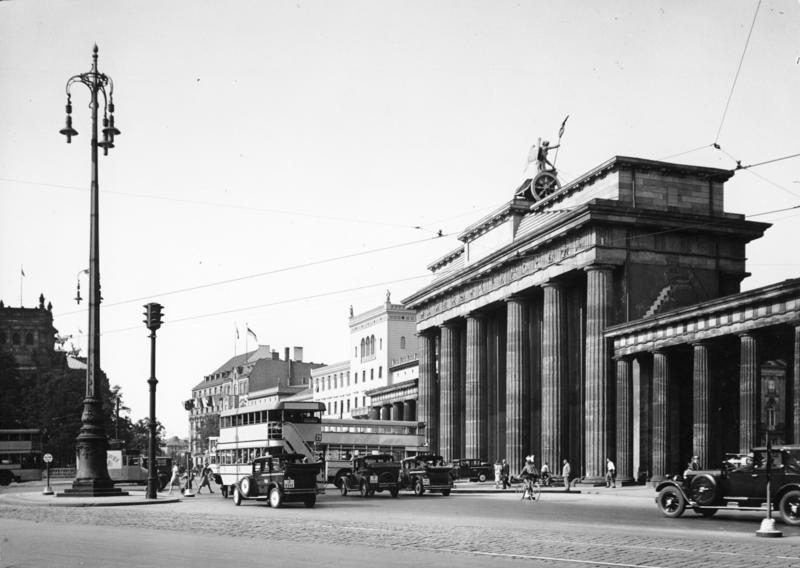
Bundesarchiv B 145 Bild-P014313, Berlin, Brandenburger Tor

=== Social control ===
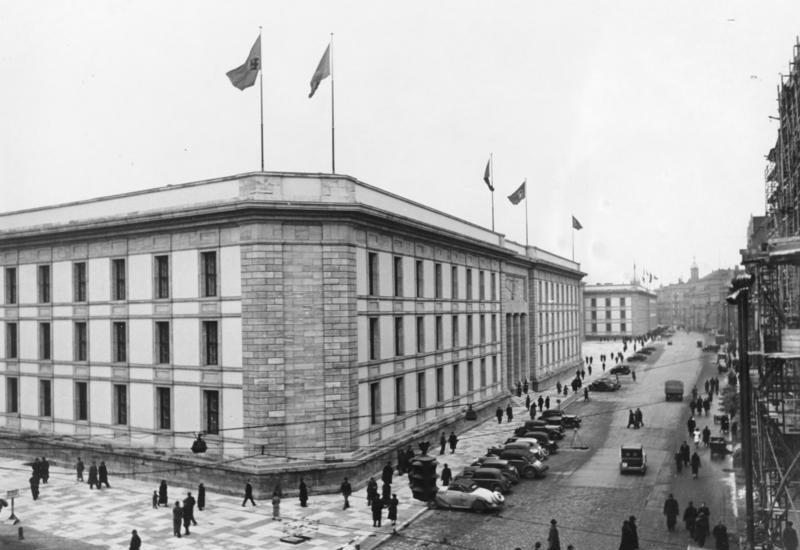
Bundesarchiv Bild 146-2005-0073, Berlin, Neue Reichskanzlei

The use of design to control populations was not a new concept. Soviet planning and architecture following the Russian Revolution in 1917 had already begun to influence the activities and thoughts of its citizens. This was achieved by introducing communist political ideas into the very nature of building and city design, such as through the construction of 'living cells' and collective farms. These activities were intended to force the people living in these areas to work and live in a way that aligned with the Marxist ideology of the government. Many similar examples may be found through history including in China and Cambodia.

For the Third Reich and other European dictatorships of this period, urban design and planning were vital to their ideological implementation on both their homelands and conquered territories to display power and authority. It was also important for enforcing their ideas of social behaviour and control. This manifested itself in many ways throughout Germany, including the replacement of slums with middle-class employment and alignment of huge monuments to be visible from the entire metropolitan area.

This application of spatial planning took a more sinister tone when Germany began conquering new territory, inhabited by people who they considered 'undesirables'. This mainly included Jews and Slavs. In these areas, urban design and planning formed part of a wide range of tools used by the Nazi Party to control and ultimately destroy these populations and their culture. They would be replaced by German settlers and culture through the wholesale destruction of existing cities and the building of new settlements in their place. These new towns would be planned in a way that would echo German cities and apply Nazi ideologies of how people should live.

=== Segregation ===
A key part of Nazi ideology was centred on ideas of racial and physical superiority to form the 'master race'. These racial and physical theories ranked different races and types of people on a scale of 'racial hygiene'.

Urban planning played a key role in the implementation of these ideas. In existing German cities, planners were instrumental in physically separating different populations through urban design, similar to the urban patterns of colonial planning. This included separate housing and designated areas in which non-Germans were prohibited. Occupied Eastern European territories were subject to more brutal and widespread urban segregation. Purpose-built ghettos in cities such as Warsaw and Lvov were deliberately created to separate Jews from the rest of the population and produce terrible living conditions. This was done by restricting the size of the areas to create extremely high densities and provide as few city services as possible. Tens of thousands died as a result.

== Places ==
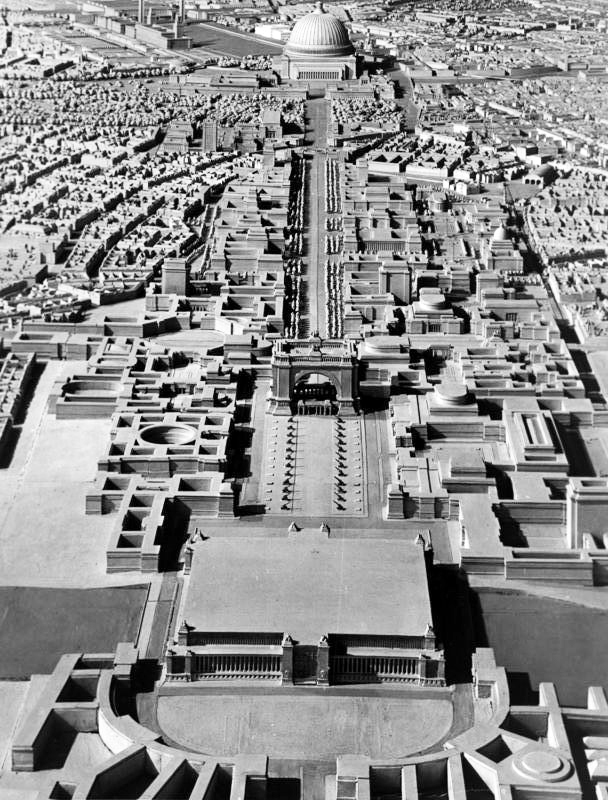
An original model for the proposed rebuilding of Berlin with the Volkshalle visible to the north

=== Germany ===
==== Berlin ====
One of the most ambitious plans of the Third Reich was the complete rebuilding of central Berlin under the new name of Germania. In the style of Haussmann's renovation of Paris in the late 19th and early 20th centuries, much of the inner city was to be demolished and replaced with grand public buildings, with wide boulevards and nationalistic monuments. This was to create a Welthauptstadt (world capital) of grand proportions for the Third Reich's conquests. Urban planning was to be used to design a city of monumental proportions showing the power of the country and the Party.

=== Poland ===
==== Warsaw ====
As one of the cities conquered by the Germans in 1939, Hitler decided to destroy Warsaw and its population, considered to be undesireable in Nazi eugenics. The city was to be replaced by a purely German town of around 130,000 people. The plan was proposed by Friedrich Pabst in 1939 under the Pabst Plan and adopted as official policy by the new German government in Poland.

The reasons for these radical changes fell well within the Nazi ideology implemented in many occupied territories. The destruction of the city was to be a symbolic show of power over the Poles by liquidating their centre of culture, history and politics. One of the first orders given to the new German mayor of Warsaw in 1939 from the German Government was "... to do everything possible to deprive Warsaw of its character as the main centre of the Polish Republic". The new town was to be built in the style of a typical German country town as a final demonstration of power over the conquered Polish people.

German planners also played a significant role in preparing the way for the implementation of the new city. This involved segregating populations into ghettos for easy control and extermination. The Warsaw Ghetto was created in 1940 and was limited by a series of walls and watchtowers. The boundaries were gradually reduced over time as conditions worsened for its 400,000 inhabitants. Similar scenarios of urban planning as a use for social control and racial segregation were to be repeated across Nazi-occupied territories, especially across Eastern Europe.

== Legacy ==
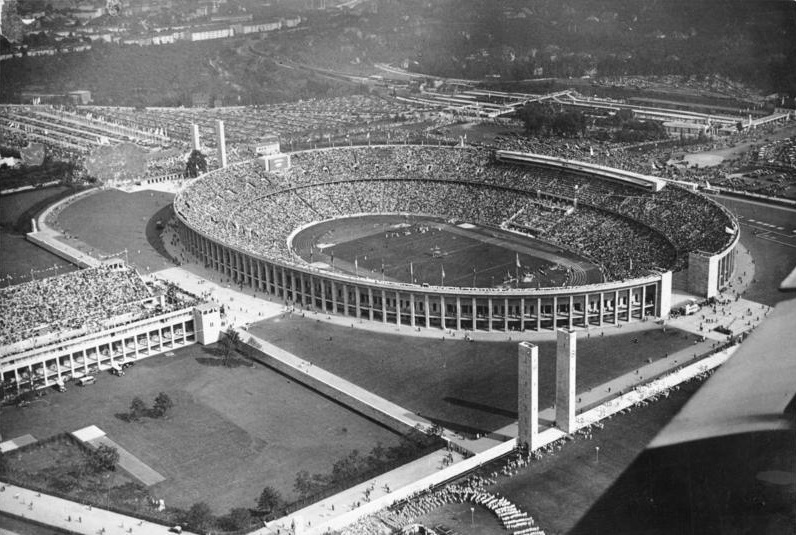
The Olympiastadion (Berlin) in 1936

Many remnants of Nazi influence on urban architecture still exist across Europe, particularly in Germany. Buildings such as the Olympiastadion, which was used for the 1936 Berlin Olympics, and the Schwerbelastungskörper, which was used to test ground conditions, are still present in Berlin. Another prominent example is the Nazi Party rally grounds in Nuremberg. However, planning didn't come close to having the lasting impact initially envisaged by Hitler and Speer. Some street layouts and other public buildings were also preserved.

80–90% of Warsaw was destroyed in combat or deliberately by the Germans seeking to implement their planned destruction. This resulted in a massive post-war rebuilding program from the 1950s to the early 1980s by the Polish communist government.

Some urban planners and designers who worked under the Nazi regime fled Germany post-war and brought their ideas and experiences with them. One prominent planner, Walter Christaller, assisted in the construction and design of settlements and regions in Israel. He brought his central place theory, developed during his work in Germany, to his designs of Israeli new towns and was instrumental in the settlement patterns of development through the 1950s to 1970s. One of his best-known examples is the city Kiryat Gat in Hevel Lakhish.

For many decades following the end of the Nazi regime, German cities were left with a stretched and spacious city design. The traffic was usually divided into individual roads separated by curbs, with one road serving each direction. Sidewalks were stretched out for pedestrian space. Car parking space was simplified and accessible with cars usually parked next to one another beside the roads facing the sidewalks. The only outcome noted by an urban planning historian was that, while the roads and sidewalks were spacious, there was much less traffic in proportion to the plentiful space, simply because car ownership was less common for its time.

== Gallery ==
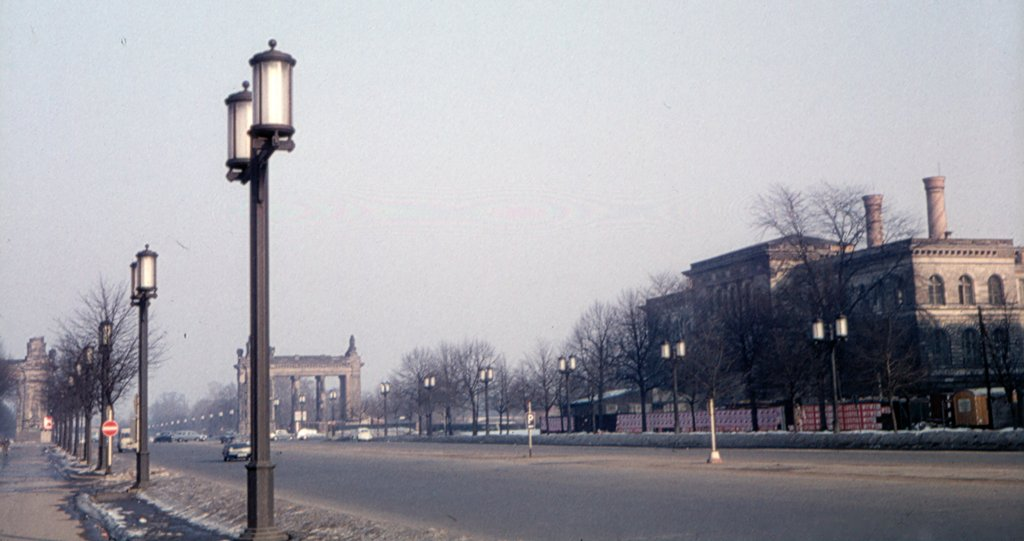
Berlin in 1965

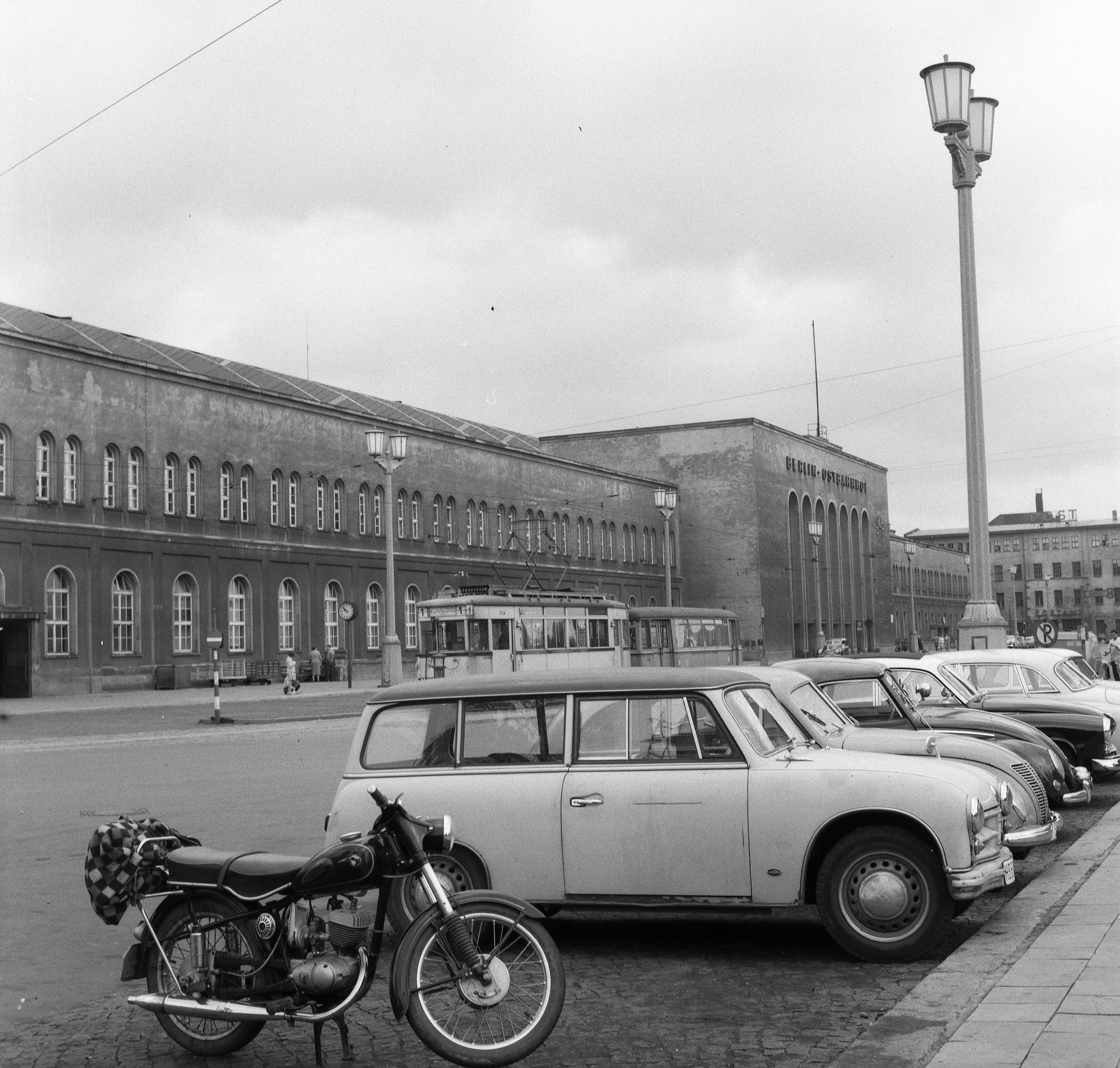
Berlin Ostbahnhof, 1962

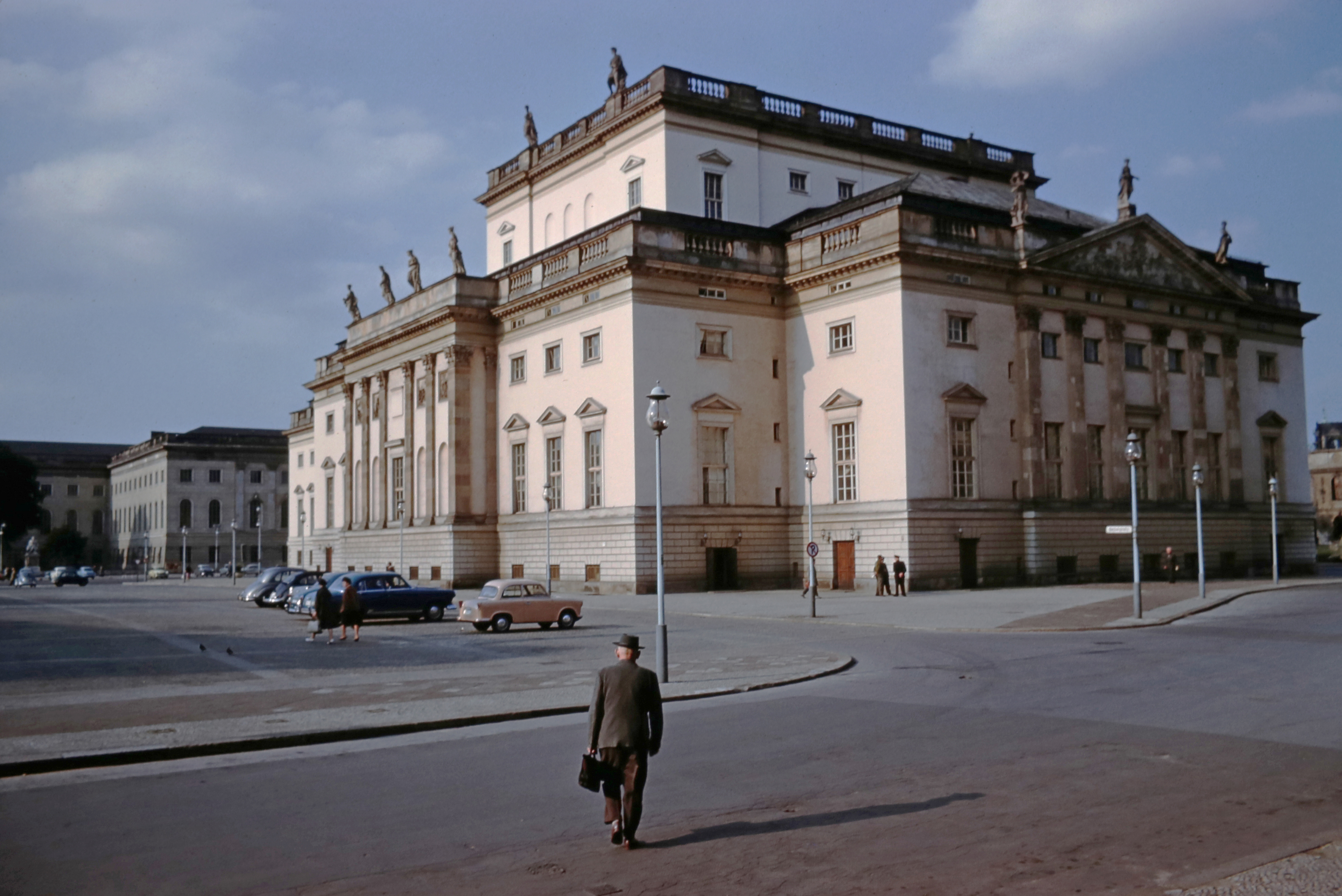
Berlin State Opera, 1961

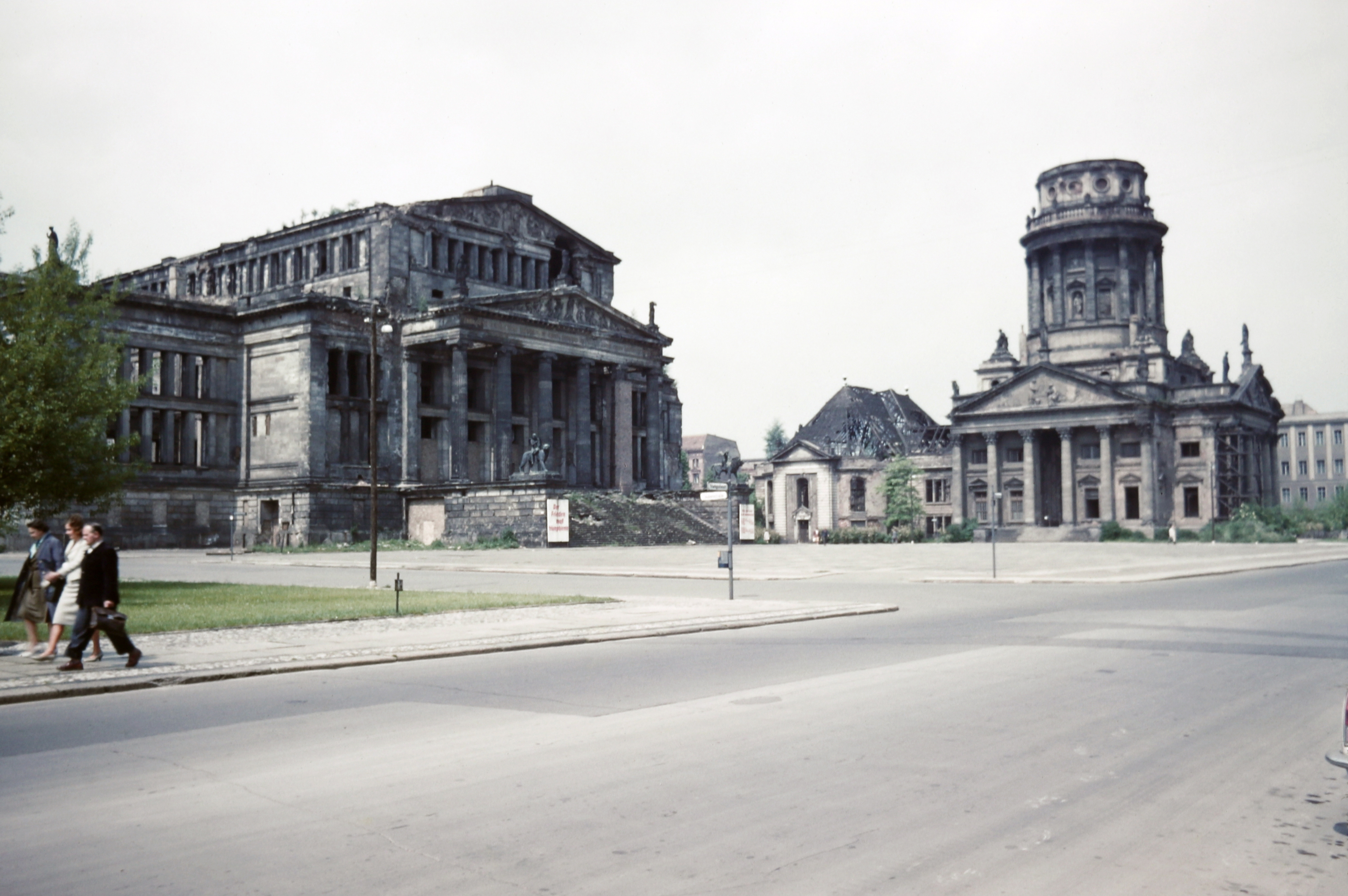
Berlin Gendarmenmarkt 1961

== See also ==
- Nazi architecture
- Index of urban planning articles
