= Nazi architecture =

Style promoted by the Nazis

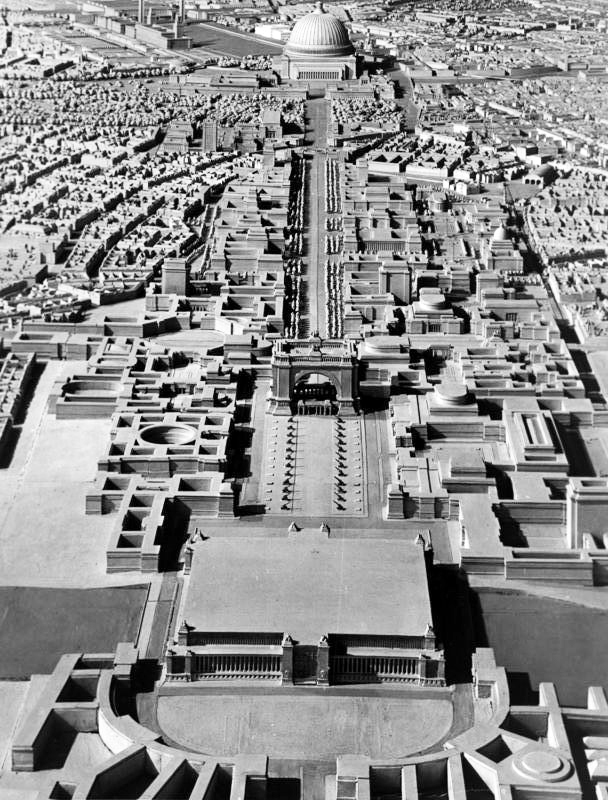
A model of Adolf Hitler's plan for Germania (Berlin) formulated under the direction of Albert Speer, looking north toward the Volkshalle at the top of the frame

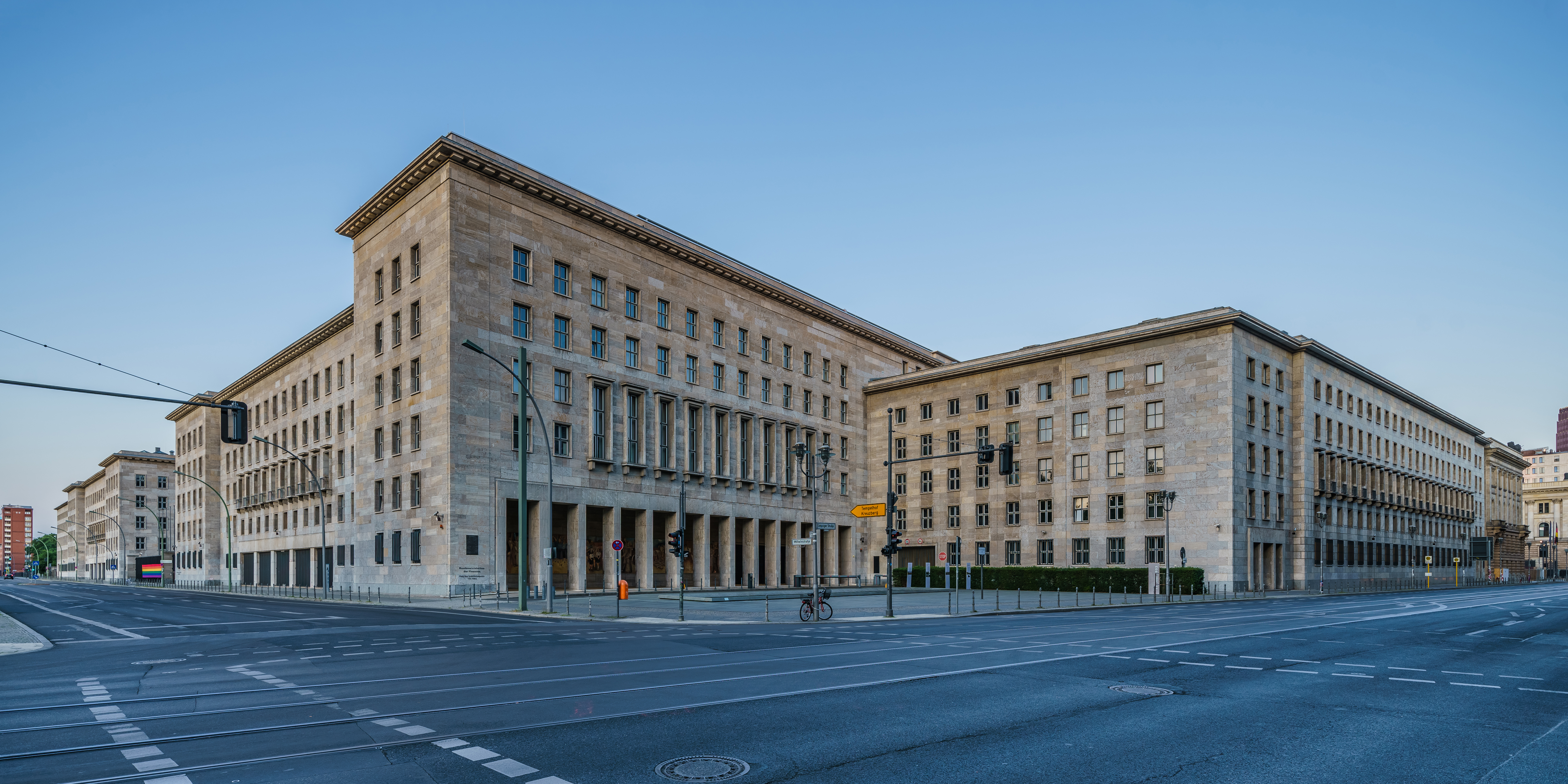
Former Ministry of Aviation in Berlin

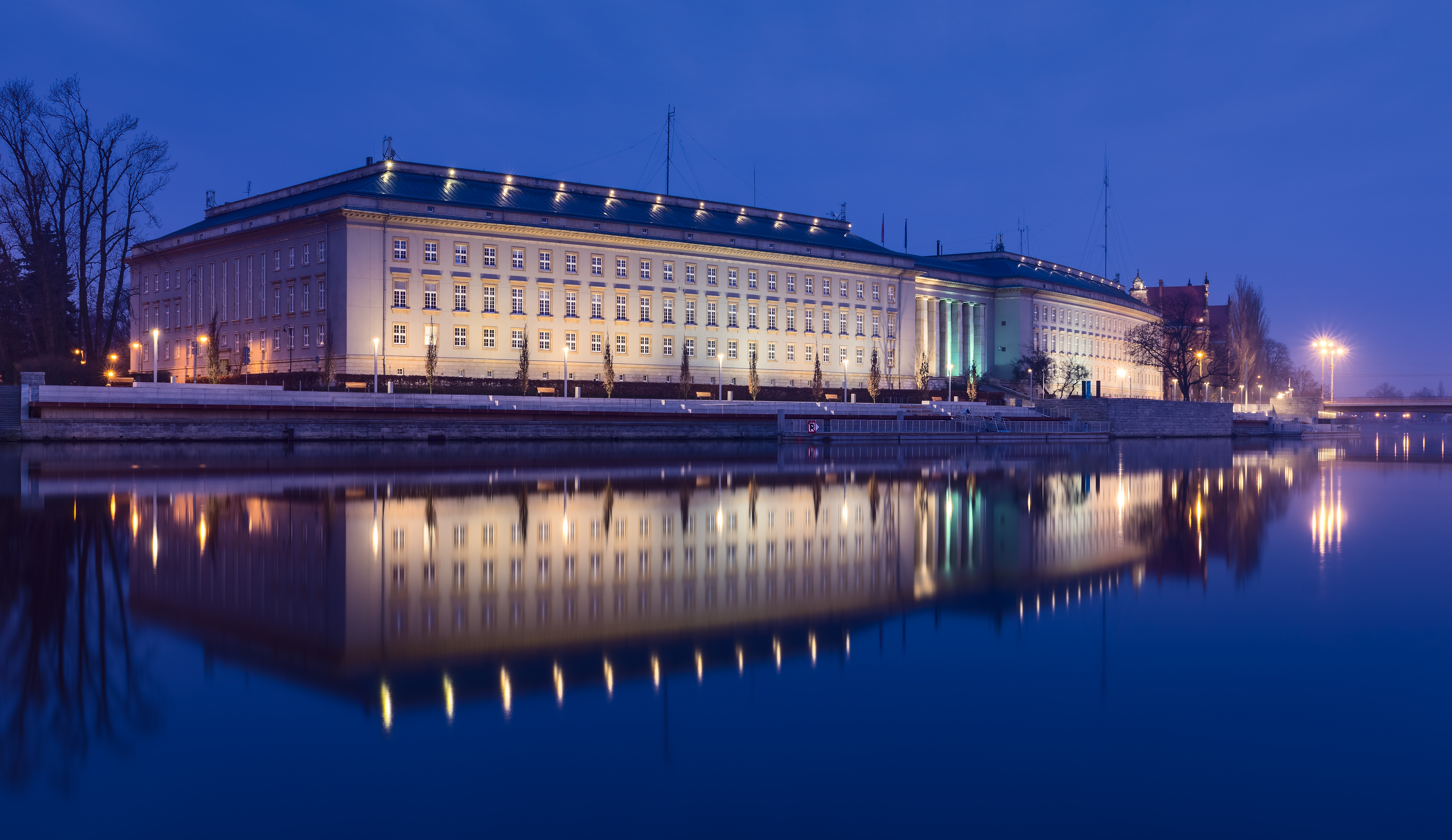
Lower Silesian Province Office in Wrocław (formerly Breslau)

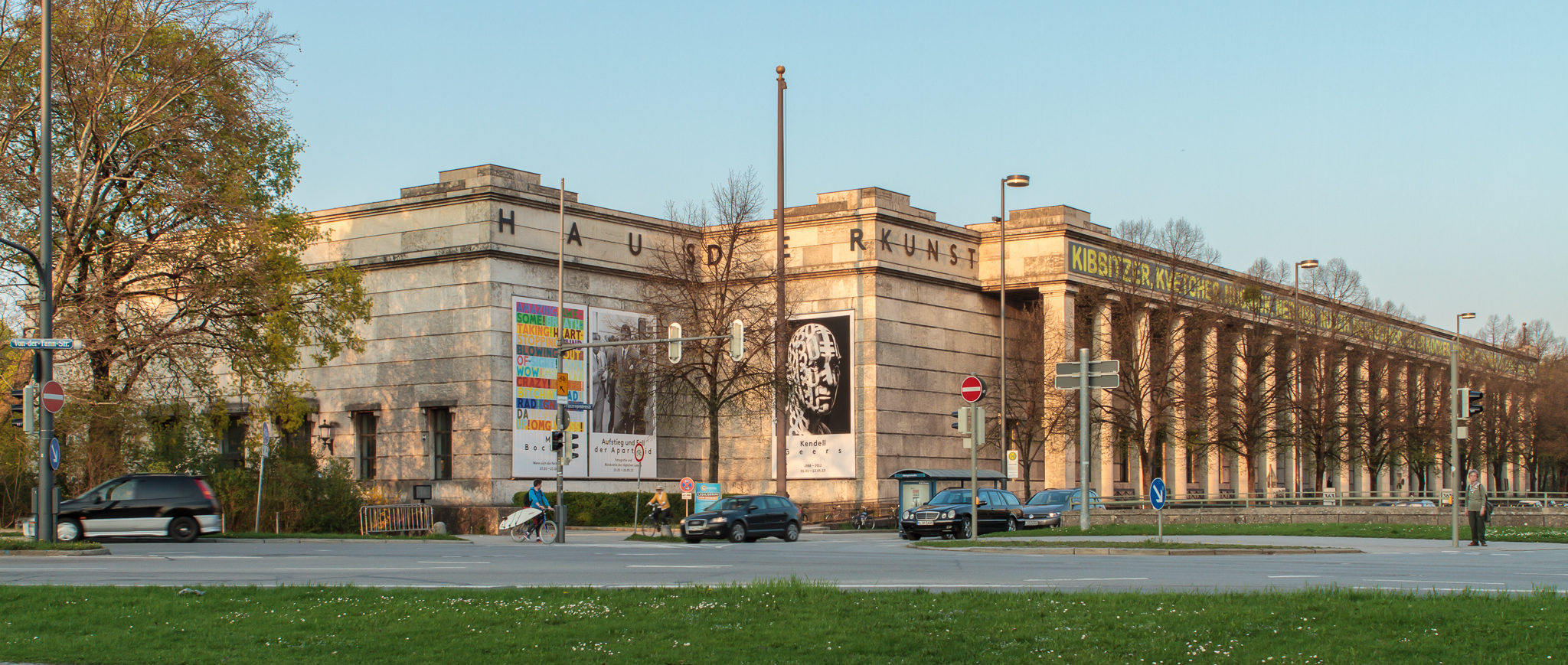
Haus der Kunst art museum in Munich

Nazi architecture is the architecture promoted by Adolf Hitler and the Nazi regime from 1933 until its fall in 1945, connected with urban planning in Nazi Germany. It is characterized by three forms: a stripped neoclassicism, typified by the designs of Albert Speer; a vernacular style that drew inspiration from traditional rural architecture, especially alpine; and a utilitarian style followed for major infrastructure projects and industrial or military complexes. Nazi ideology took a pluralist attitude to architecture; however, Hitler himself believed that form follows function and wrote against "stupid imitations of the past".

While similar to Classicism, the official Nazi style is distinguished by the impression it leaves on viewers. Architectural style was used by the Nazis to deliver and enforce their ideology. Formal elements like flat roofs, horizontal extension, uniformity, and the lack of décor created "an impression of simplicity, uniformity, monumentality, solidity and eternity," which is how the Nazi Party wanted to appear. Greek and Roman influence could also be seen in Nazi architecture and typography, as they drew inspiration from monumental architecture of ancient Rome and Greece to create a sense of power. The Nazis also shut down the Bauhaus movement, which emphasized functionalism and simplicity. The Nazi regime also staged several "Degenerate Art" exhibitions to condemn modern art as harmful to German culture. This led to the persecution of many artists and architects, including members of the Bauhaus movement.

The Volkswagen was also a product of Nazi architecture and industrial design. Hitler commissioned Ferdinand Porsche to design a "people's car" that was supposed to be affordable and accessible to all Germans, which resulted in the creation of the Volkswagen Beetle. Adlerhorst bunker complex looked like a collection of Fachwerk (half-timbered) cottages. Seven buildings in the style of Franconian half-timbered houses were constructed in Nuremberg in 1939 and 1940. German Jewish architects were banned, e.g. Erich Mendelsohn and Julius Posener emigrated in 1933.

== Forced labor ==
The construction of new buildings served other purposes beyond reaffirming Nazi ideology. In Flossenbürg and elsewhere, the Schutzstaffel built forced-labor camps where prisoners of the Third Reich were forced to mine stone and make bricks, much of which went directly to Albert Speer for use in his rebuilding of Berlin and other projects in Germany. These new buildings were also built by forced-laborers. Working conditions were harsh, and many laborers died. This process of mining and construction allowed Nazis to fulfill political and economic goals simultaneously while creating buildings that fulfilled ideological expression goals.

== Greek and Roman influence ==
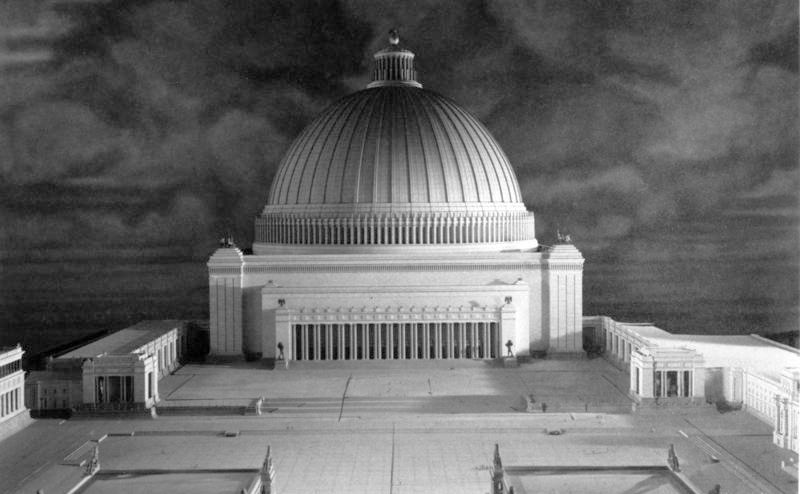
Unbuilt Volkshalle

Hitler was fascinated by the Roman empire and its architecture, which he imitated with a stripped-down style called "starved neo-Classicism." In 1934, he put Albert Speer in charge of building construction and began an ambitious program to create massive public buildings, including a Führermuseum in Linz, Austria. Hitler had a long-standing vision for a monumental Volkshalle or Grosse Halle, and Speer created a design for a building that would dwarf any structure in existence at the time, with a seating capacity of 180,000 and a dome 16 times larger than that of St. Peter's Basilica in Rome. The building was meant to inspire awe and emphasize the power of the Nazi state, rather than any spiritual or religious sentiment unlike Roman or Greek buildings.

=== Typography ===
The Nazis wanted to bring all aspects of society together under a process called Gleichschaltung. It began immediately after the Nazis came into power. They used propaganda, censorship, and mass rallies to enforce their message. The new typography was inspired by Classical Roman Imperial letterforms, which was Hitler's own preference.

== Welthauptstadt Germania ==
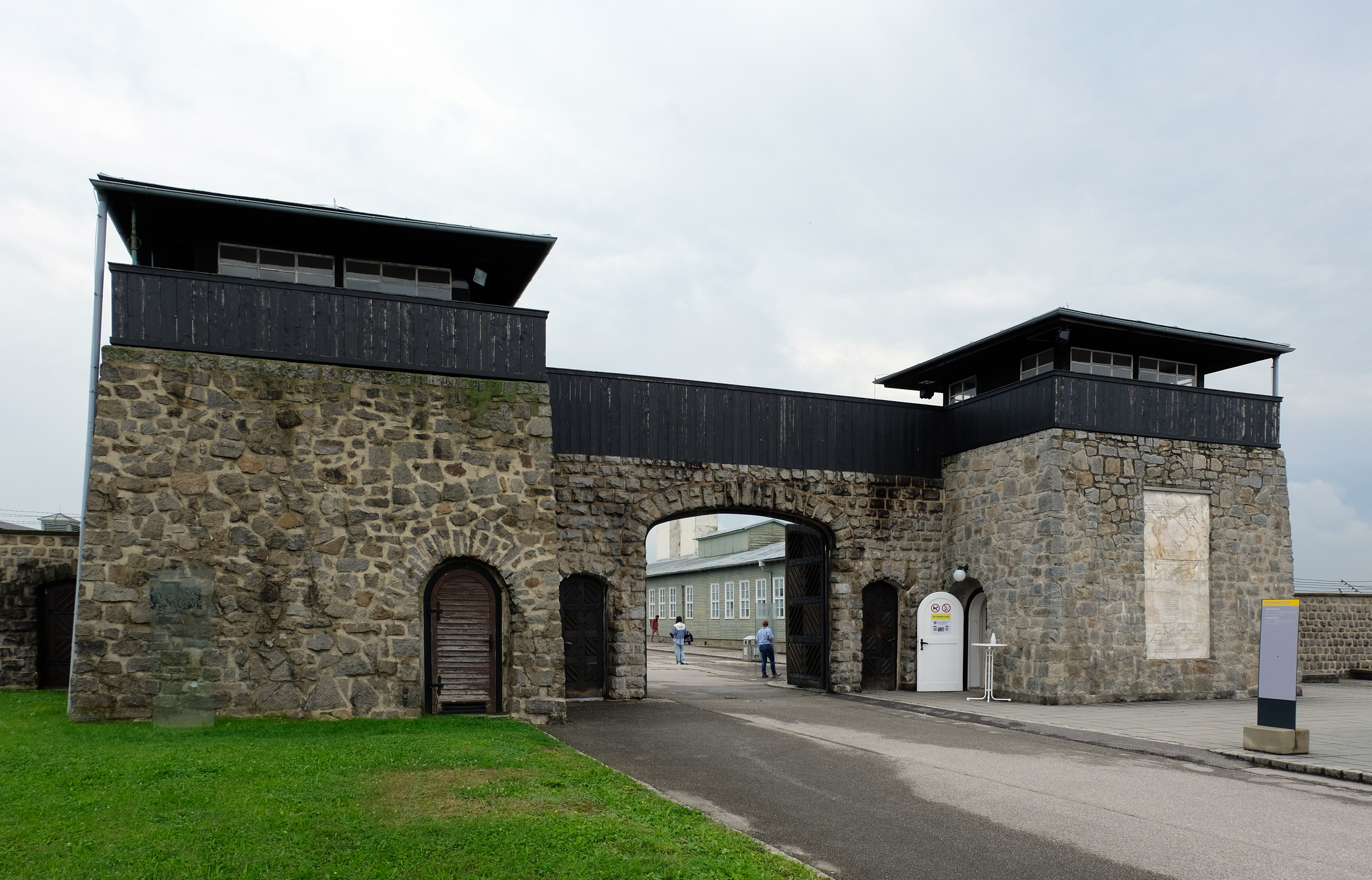
KZ Mauthausen gate

The crowning achievement of this movement was to be Welthauptstadt Germania, the projected renewal of the German capital Berlin following the Nazis' presumed victory of World War II. Speer, who oversaw the project, produced most of the plans for the new city. Only a small portion of the "World Capital" was ever built between 1937 and 1943. The plan's core features included the creation of a great neoclassical city based on an east–west axis with the Berlin Victory Column at its centre. Major Nazi buildings like the Reichstag or the Große Halle (never built) would adjoin wide boulevards. A great number of historic buildings in the city were demolished in the planned construction zones. However, with defeat of the Third Reich, the work was never started.

== Nazi Austria ==
=== Greater Vienna ===
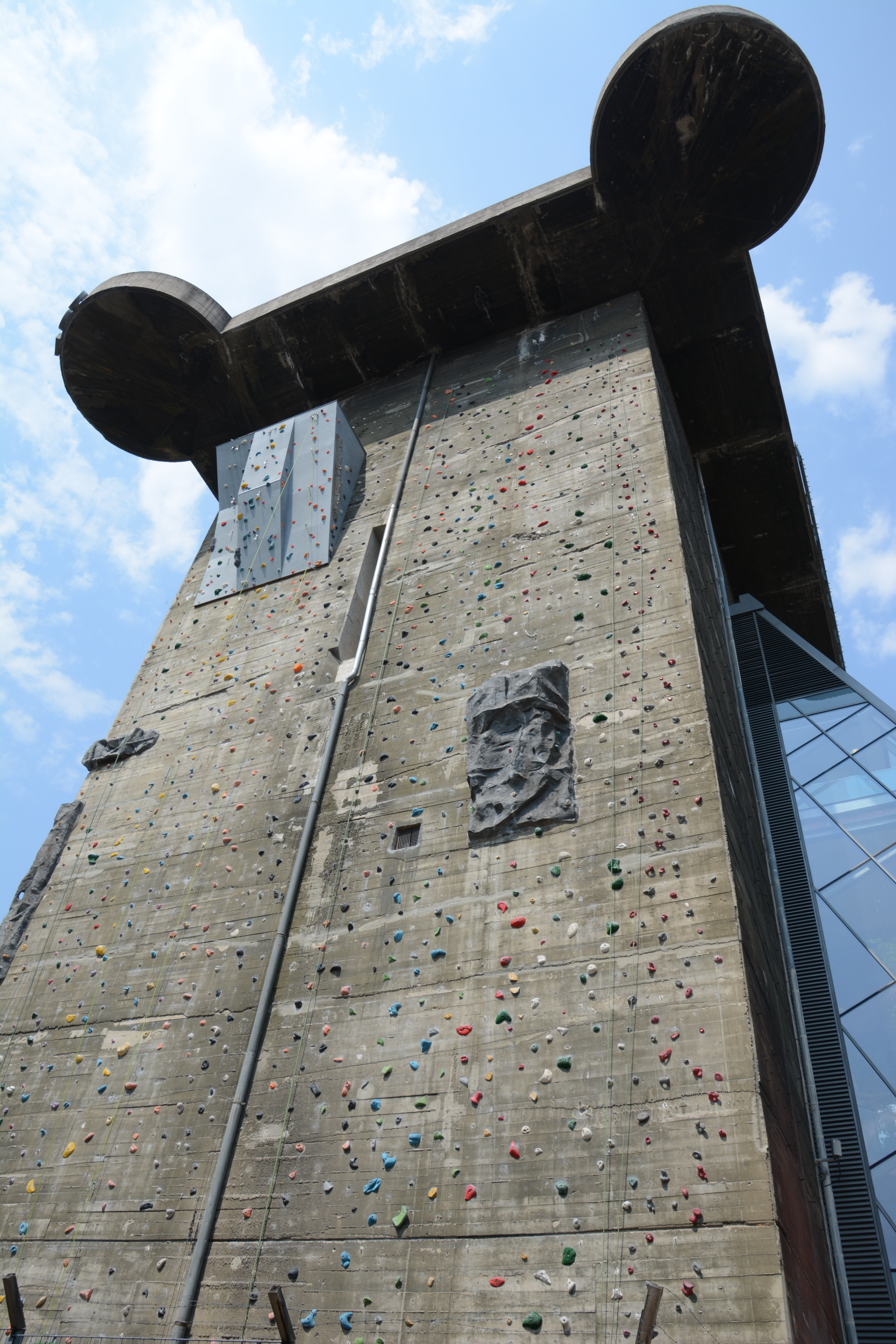
Haus des Meeres

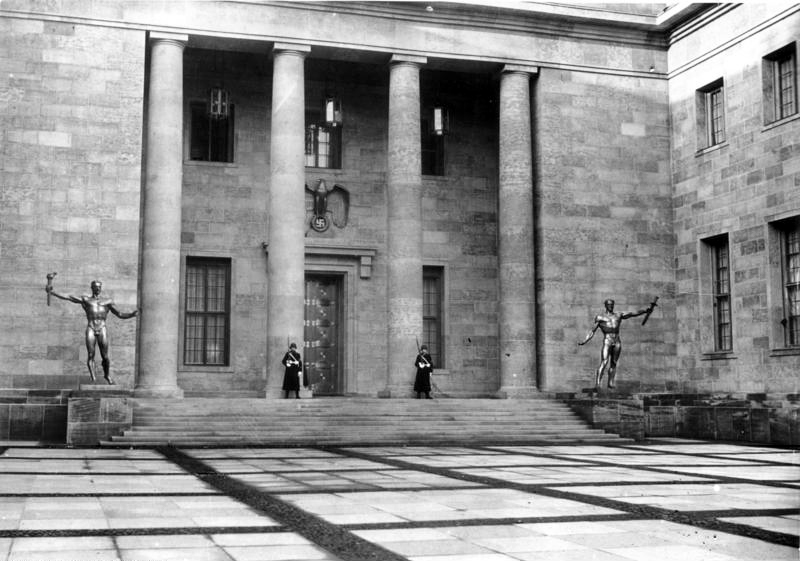
Albert Speer's New Reich Chancellery with Arno Breker's two statues, completed in 1939

Greater Vienna was the second-largest city of the Reich, three times greater than old Vienna. Three pairs of concrete flak towers were constructed between 1942 and 1944; one of them is known as Haus des Meeres, another one, Contemporary Art Depot (currently closed).

=== Linz ===
Linz was one of the Führer cities. Only Nibelungen Bridge was constructed.

== Housing construction ==
The Nazis constructed many apartments, 100,000 of them in Berlin alone, mostly as housing estates e.g. in Grüne Stadt (Green Town) in Prenzlauer Berg. Volkswagen's city Wolfsburg was originally constructed by the Nazis.

== Opposition to Bauhaus ==
The Bauhaus movement began in 1919, in Weimar, Germany. It was a school that brought together artists and craftspeople to pursue and master their crafts together in one place. The movement's aim was to create a utopian society for artists and designers. The first version of the school was under the leadership of Walter Gropius for nine years. The school then moved to Dessau in 1925, where Gropius designed the Bauhaus Building and several other buildings. The school moved to Berlin in 1932, but under constant harassment by the Nazis, it finally closed.

== Proponents of Nazi architecture ==
- Hermann Bartels
- Peter Behrens
- German Bestelmeyer
- Paul Bonatz
- Woldemar Brinkmann
- Walter Brugmann
- Richard Ermisch
- Gottfried Feder
- Roderich Fick
- Theodor Fischer
- Leonhard Gall
- Hermann Giesler
- Wilhelm Grebe
- Johann Friedrich Höger
- Eugen Hönig
- Clemens Klotz
- Wilhelm Kreis
- Werner March
- Konrad Nonn
- Ludwig Ruff
- Franz Ruff
- Ernst Sagebiel
- Paul Schmitthenner
- Julius Schulte-Frohlinde
- Paul Schultze-Naumburg
- Alexander von Senger
- Albert Speer
- Paul Troost
- Rudolf Wolters

== Surviving examples of Nazi architecture ==
- The Academy for Youth Leadership in Braunschweig
- The Berchtesgaden Chancellery Branch office in Bischofswiesen
- The new terminal building at Berlin Tempelhof Airport
- The widening of the Charlottenburger Chaussee in Berlin
- The former Reichsbank building in Berlin
- The Führerbau in Munich
- The Gauforum in Weimar
- The Haus der Kunst in Munich
- The Kehlsteinhaus in Berchtesgaden
- The Ministry of Aviation building in Berlin
- The Nazi party rally grounds in Nuremberg
- The Olympiastadion in Berlin
- The NS-Ordensburgen Krössinsee, Sonthofen and Vogelsang
- The Prora building complex in Rügen
- The Theater Saarbrücken in Saarbrücken
- The Mausoleum Schlesier-Ehrenmal in Wałbrzych, Poland
- The Lower Silesian Government Office Building in Wrocław, Poland.

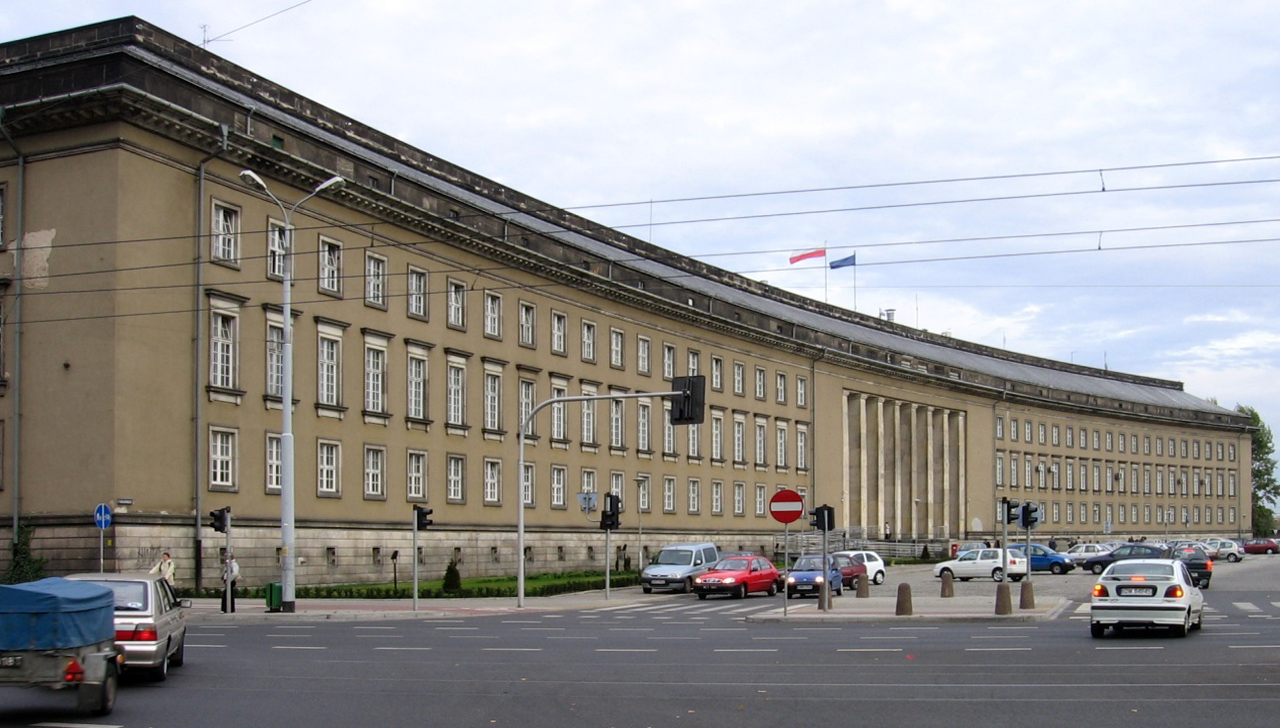
The Lower Silesian Government Office Building in Wrocław, Poland

== See also ==
- Ehrentempel
- Fascist architecture
- Führer Headquarters
- Führermuseum
- List of Nazi constructions
- Reactionary modernism
- Schwerbelastungskörper
- Stalinist architecture
- Totalitarian architecture
- Urban planning in Nazi Germany
- Völkisch movement
- Hitlerbauten
- Ruin value
- Degenerate Art
