= Roderich Fick =

German architect (1886–1955)

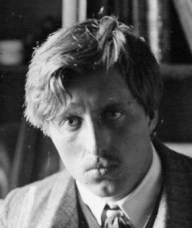
- Born: 16 November 1886; Würzburg, Germany
- Died: 13 July 1955 (aged 68); Munich, Germany
- Occupation: Architect

Roderich Fick (16 November 1886 – 13 July 1955) was a German architect most prominent during the Nazi regime.

Fick became a professor at the Munich Technical University in 1935, designed the Munich residence of Rudolf Hess in 1936, joined the NSDAP in 1937, and thereby secured Nazi projects such as various buildings at Adolf Hitler's Obersalzberg complex and such as SS barracks. Fick also was given the task of redesigning Linz. His work was part of the architecture event in the art competition at the 1936 Summer Olympics.

After the war, Fick was officially classified as a Mitläufer, a 'fellow traveller', a person passively complicit in Nazi crimes. Fick participated in the reconstruction of Linz, and retired to practice in Bavaria. His first wife died on 2 October 1938; in 1948, he married Catharina Büscher, 28 years his junior. His daughter, Friedrike, was born in 1950.

== See also ==
- Nazi architecture
