= Egotism =

Drive to maintain and enhance favorable views of oneself

Egotism is defined as the drive to maintain and enhance favorable views of oneself and generally features an inflated opinion of one's personal features and importance distinguished by a person's amplified vision of one's self and self-importance. It often includes intellectual, physical, social, and other overestimations. The egotist has an overwhelming sense of the centrality of the "me" regarding their personal qualities.

== Characteristics ==
Egotism is closely related to an egocentric love for one's imagined self or narcissism. Egotists have a strong tendency to talk about themselves in a self-promoting fashion, and they may well be arrogant and boastful with a grandiose sense of their own importance. Their inability to recognise the accomplishments of others leaves them profoundly self-promoting; while sensitivity to criticism may lead, on the egotist's part, to narcissistic rage at a sense of insult.

Egotism differs from both altruism – or behaviour motivated by the concern for others rather than for oneself – and from egoism, the constant pursuit of one's self-interest. Various forms of "empirical egoism" have been considered consistent with egotism, but do not – which is also the case with egoism in general – necessitate having an inflated sense of self.

== Development ==
In developmental terms, two different paths can be taken to reach egotism – one being individual, and the other being cultural.

With respect to the developing individual, a movement takes place from egocentricity to sociality during the process of growing up. It is normal for an infant to have an inflated sense of egotism. The over-evaluation of one's own ego regularly appears in childish forms of love.

Optimal development allows a gradual decrease into a more realistic view of one's own place in the world. A less optimal adjustment may later lead to what has been called defensive egotism, serving to overcompensate for a fragile concept of self. Robin Skynner however considered that in the main growing up leads to a state where "your ego is still there, but it's taking its proper limited place among all the other egos".

However, alongside such a positive trajectory of diminishing individual egotism, a rather different arc of development can be noted in cultural terms, linked to what has been seen as the increasing infantilism of post-modern society. Whereas in the nineteenth century egotism was still widely regarded as a traditional vice – for Nathaniel Hawthorne egotism was a sort of diseased self-contemplation – Romanticism had already set in motion a countervailing current, what Richard Eldridge described as a kind of "cultural egotism, substituting the individual imagination for vanishing social tradition". The romantic idea of the self-creating individual – of a self-authorizing, artistic egotism – then took on broader social dimensions in the following century. Keats might still attack Wordsworth for the regressive nature of his retreat into the egotistical sublime; but by the close of the twentieth century egotism had been naturalized much more widely by the Me generation into the Culture of Narcissism.

In the 21st century, romantic egotism has been seen as feeding into techno-capitalism in two complementary ways: on the one hand, through the self-centred consumer, focused on their own self-fashioning through brand 'identity'; on the other through the equally egotistical voices of 'authentic' protest, as they rage against the machine, only to produce new commodity forms that serve to fuel the system for further consumption.

== Sexuality ==
There is a question mark over the relationship between sexuality and egotism. Sigmund Freud popularly made the claim that intimacy can transform the egotist, giving a new sense of humility in relation to others.

At the same time, it is very apparent that egotism can readily show itself in sexual ways and indeed arguably one's whole sexuality may function in the service of egotistical needs.

== Social egotism ==
Leo Tolstoy used the term aduyevschina (after the protagonist Aduyev of Ivan Goncharov's first novel, A Common Story) to describe social egotism as the inability of some people to see beyond their immediate interests.

== Etymology ==
The term egotism is derived from the Greek ("εγώ") and subsequently its Latinised ego (ego), meaning "self" or "I," and -ism, used to denote a system of belief. As such, the term shares early etymology with egoism.

== Egotism vs. pride ==
Egotism differs from pride. Although they share the state of mind of an individual, ego is defined by a person's self-perception. That is how the particular individual thinks, feels and distinguishes him/herself from others. Pride may be equated to the feeling one experiences as the direct result of one's accomplishment or success.

== Cultural examples ==
- A. A. Milne has been praised for his clear-eyed vision of the ruthless, open, unashamed egotism of the young child.
- Ryan Holiday described our cultural values as dependent on validation, entitled, and ruled by our emotions, a form of egotism.

== See also ==
- Ahamkara
- Egocentrism
- Ego ideal
- Egomania
- Elitism
- Ethical egoism
- Grandiosity
- Hubris
- Implicit egotism
- Megalomania (disambiguation)
- Narcissistic elation
- Pride
- Psychological egoism
- Psychopathy
- Rational egoism
- Selfishness
- Solipsism
- Souvenirs d'égotisme
