= Gigantomania =

Production of superfluously large works

Gigantomania (from Ancient Greek γίγας gigas, "giant" and μανία mania, "madness") is the production of unusually and superfluously large works.

Gigantomania is in varying degrees a feature of the political and cultural lives of prehistoric and ancient civilizations (Megalithic cultures, Ancient Egypt, Ancient Rome, Ancient China, Aztec civilization), several totalitarian regimes (Stalin's USSR, Nazi Germany, Fascist Italy, Maoist China, Juche Korea), as well as of contemporary capitalist countries (notably for skyscrapers and shopping malls).

== By country ==
=== Soviet Union ===
The social engineering and modernization efforts in agriculture and industry of Soviet dictator Joseph Stalin have been described as gigantomaniac. The creation of extremely large industrial complexes, farms, engineering efforts, buildings and statues was to prove the superiority of the socialist system over capitalism. These projects also aimed for a mass transformation of the Russian peasant society into a proletarian one: massive construction sites, such as Magnitogorsk, also functioned as ideological education centers for the workers or Gulag inmates.

In addition to massive construction projects, Stalin's gigantomania can be seen in the ideologue of Stakhanovism, which emphasized constantly over-fulfilling production target quotas.

Soviet gigantomania continued, albeit with less popularity, after Stalin's death.

=== Nazi Germany ===
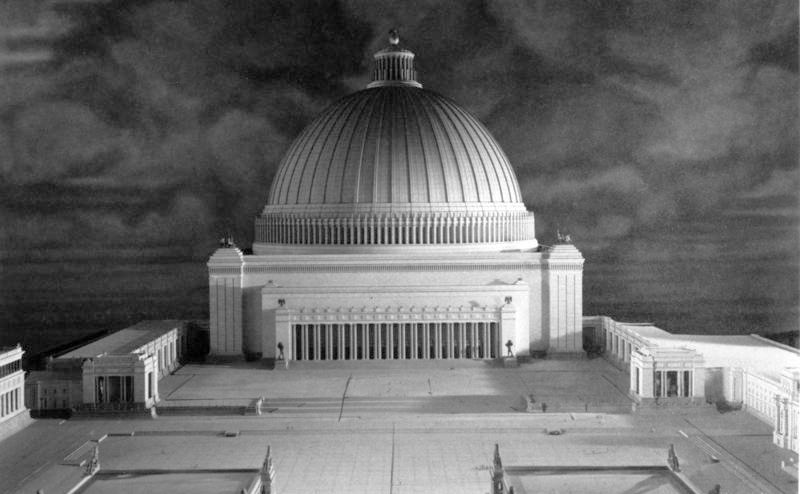
Volkshalle

German dictator Adolf Hitler was extremely interested in architecture, and desired works of monumental scale to be built to represent the values and achievements of the Nazi regime, and to impress foreigners and later generations. He stated that architecture was "the Word in stone" (i.e. it was inseparable from politics), which demonstrated if a civilization was in ascendancy or in decline. Colossal architecture was to render the individual impotent by its sheer scale, and then mold him according to the values of National Socialism.

Albert Speer reports in his memoirs that Hitler's irrational obsession for the gigantic was also demonstrated in his demand for super-heavy tanks, which had limited usability in the battlefield.

=== North Korea ===
Korean dictator Kim Il Sung endorsed a number of hydroelectric engineering projects with gigantic Stalinist scale. They were intended to represent man's ability to transform nature according to his will, which is one of the tenets of the Juche ideology. Massive urbanisation of the capital Pyongyang was also undertaken during Kim Il-Sung's rule. The high-rise suburbs are connected to downtown by huge thoroughfares – one even being 10 lanes wide. The building of superfluously sized monuments and buildings in order emphasize state power and Kim Il-Sung's cult of personality was continued even after the De-Stalinization process in the Soviet Union.

== See also ==
- Grandiose delusions
- List of largest buildings
- List of visionary tall buildings and structures
- Megalomania (disambiguation)
- Megalophobia
- Megaproject
- Megastructure
- Totalitarian architecture
