= Janine Chasseguet-Smirgel =

French psychologist & psychoanalyst

- Born: 1928; Paris
- Died: 5 March 2006 (aged 77–78)
- Occupations: Psychoanalyst; psychologist
- Organizations: Paris Psychoanalytic Society; International Psychoanalytical Association
- Spouse: Béla Grunberger
- Awards: Gay-Lussac Humboldt Prize; 1988

Academic work
- Institutions: University College London; University of Lille Nord de France
- Notable ideas: reworking of ego ideal theory

Janine Chasseguet-Smirgel (1928 – March 5, 2006) (whose surname is alternatively spelled Chasseguet-Smirguel, but generally not in English-language publications) was a leading French psychoanalyst, a training analyst, and past President of the Société psychanalytique de Paris in France. From 1983 to 1989, she was Vice President of the International Psychoanalytical Association. Chasseguet-Smirgel was Freud Professor at the University College, London, and Professor of Psychopathology at the Université Lille Nord de France. She is best known for her reworking of the Freudian theory of the ego ideal and its connection to primary narcissism, as well as for her extension of this theory to a critique of utopian ideology.

== Biography and career ==
Chasseguet-Smirgel was born in Paris in 1928; as a Jew of Central European ancestry, she lost many relatives in the Holocaust. She became a psychoanalyst, then carried out further studies in political science and eventually earned a doctorate in psychology. Like many other young French intellectuals, she broke with the Communist Party after the Soviet invasion of Hungary in 1956.

=== Psychoanalytical critic of the French students' rebellion in 1968 ===
By the time of the student rebellions of May 1968, she had become a political conservative. In their anonymous 1969 book L'univers contestationnaire (reworked and published in English in 1986 as Freud or Reich? Psychoanalysis and Illusion), Chasseguet-Smirgel and her husband and co-author Béla Grunberger argued that the utopian political ideology of the student demonstrators, as well as of their Freudo-Marxist avatars Herbert Marcuse and Gilles Deleuze, was fueled by primary narcissism, the desire to return to the maternal womb. Further, that the very term "Freudo-Marxism" was oxymoronic—one could not reconcile the reality principle with the Communist utopia. Chasseguet-Smirgel's analysis of the views of the Freudian dissident Wilhelm Reich, who attempted a systematization of the libido, posits an explanation of why his orgone theory collected followers despite its apparent pseudoscientific character.

As in many cases of paranoia, the coherent and systematic appearance of ideas is a symptom which allows the subject to function in an apparently normal way. The internal necessity that forces paranoiacs to persuade others as to the reality of their system of belief results in their 'recruiting' converts. These disciples will tend to be seduced by the paranoiac's ideas in so far as these deny reality and mobilize Illusion; an illusion which will be backed by manic rationalization. (Freud or Reich?, page 109)

Notably, Lacan mentioned this book with great disdain. While Grunberger and Chasseguet-Smirgel were still cloaked by the pseudonym, Lacan remarked that for sure none of the authors belonged to his school, as none would stoop to such a low drivel.

=== The ego ideal ===
Chasseguet-Smirgel's critique of the totalitaritan ideology was a contribution to psychohistory. In her 1973 study La maladie d'idéalité (The ego ideal : a psychoanalytic essay on the malady of the ideal), Chasseguet-Smirgel expanded upon her neo-Freudian reworking. Fantasy plays a vital role in the normative development of the individual—it "implies the idea of a project" (The ego ideal pp. 40–41). For example, a child who fantasizes that she has greater abilities than a star athlete or musician may well eventually realize these goals, if her fantasy includes daily practice. When one project is complete, the child will fantasize further, leading to further work and further development. Even if the child successfully imitates his model, however, the ego ideal will interpret this "success" as failure. For in its quest for omnipotence, the ego ideal "prefers absolute solutions" (The ego ideal pp. 40–41). The tension between the ego and its ideal is only lessened with maturity, when the adult, having reached Freud's "scientific" stage, acknowledges that omnipotence is unattainable by anyone (The ego ideal pp. 29–30).

Thus, Chasseguet-Smirgel postulates that the ego ideal, by "impl[ying] the promise of a return to that primitive state of fusion" (The ego ideal p. 43), effectively functions as a "maturation drive" (The ego ideal p. 44). Unfortunately, Chasseguet-Smirgel argues, environmental factors often interfere with the maturation drive. If the child's frustrations are too great, for example, reality-testing breaks down, and his "narcissism . . . remains split off from its instinctual life and cathects an exaggerated ego ideal" (The ego ideal p. 32)

[These frustrations] may cause a regression towards a more archaic form of 'narcissistic reinstatement,' or even towards psychotic megalomania in which the original lack of differentiation between internal and external perceptions recurs. (The ego ideal p.28)

Chasseguet-Smirgel argues for the ego ideal theory's relevance to the psychology of the group. She claims that the ego ideal "tends to reinstate Illusion," unlike the superego, which "[tends] to promote reality" (EI 76). Because of this fundamental opposition, the superego may be "swept away, as it were, by the sudden reactivation of the old wish for the union of ego and ideal." As Freud argued in Group Psychology and the Analysis of the Ego (Massenpsychologie und Ich-Analyse), the authority of the group can easily be substituted for the conscience of the individual, thus removing the superego's inhibitions and licensing forbidden pleasures (The ego ideal p. 78-79).

Taking the most notorious modern example of a group run amok, she argues that Hitler's function in Nazism was that of a "promoter of Illusion":

If one considers that [the leader's] promise [of the arrival of Illusion] stimulates the wish for the fusion of ego and ideal by way of regression and induces the ego to melt into the omnipotent primary object, to encompass the entire universe . . . one can understand, in a general way, that the propensity to a loss of the ego's boundaries makes the individual particularly liable to identify himself not only with each member of the group but with the group formation as a whole. His megalomania finds its expression in this, each person's ego being extended to the whole group. The members of the group lose their individuality and begin to resemble ants or termites. This loss of personal characteristics . . . thus allows each member to feel himself to be, not a minute, undifferentiated particle of a vast whole, but, on the contrary, identified with the totality of the group, thereby conferring on himself an omnipotent ego, a colossal body. (The ego ideal p.85)

While Chasseguet-Smirgel saw Jacques Lacan as a pseudoscientific fraud, one of her central arguments, that the formation of the ego ideal is the infant's response to the discovery that he is not omnipotent, recalls Lacan's famous mirror stage essay.

=== Controversies and polemics with the Lacanian school and others ===
Deleuze and Guattari, in their 1972 work Anti-Œdipus take the example of Chasseguet-Smirgel and Bela Grunberger, who wrote under the pseudonym André Stéphane, to argue that traditionally psychoanalysis enthusiastically embraces a police state:

As to those who refuse to be oedipalized in one form or another, at one end or the other in the treatment, the psychoanalyst is there to call the asylum or the police for help. The police on our side!—never did psychoanalysis better display its taste for supporting the movement of social repression, and for participating in it with enthusiasm. [...] notice of the dominant tone in the most respected associations: consider Dr. Mendel and the Drs Stéphane, the state of fury that is theirs, and their literally police-like appeal at the thought that someone might try to escape the Oedipal dragnet. Oedipus is one of those things that becomes all the more dangerous the less people believe in it; then the cops are there to replace the high priests.

In November 1968, Grunberger and Chasseguet-Smirgel, both members of the Paris section of the International Psychoanalytical Association (IPa), disguised themselves under the pseudonym André Stéphane and published L’univers Contestationnaire. In this book they assumed that the left-wing rioters of May 68 were totalitarian stalinists, and psychoanalyzed them saying that they were affected by a sordid infantilism caught up in an Oedipal revolt against the Father.

Notably Lacan, mentioned this book with great disdain. While Grunberger and Chasseguet-Smirgel were still disguised under the pseudonym, Lacan remarked that for sure none of the authors belonged to his school, as none would abase themselves to such low drivel. The two IPa analysts responded accusing the Lacan School of "intellectual terrorism".

Deleuze and Guattari also mention Grunberger and Chasseguet-Smirgel's book as an example of the cop-like tone of the psychoanalysts who want to impose the Oedipus model upon everyone; psychoanalysts like them consider those "who do not bow to the imperialism of Oedipus as dangerous deviants, leftists who ought to be handed over to social and police repression."

Chasseguet-Smirgel was referenced in American artist Mike Kelley catalogue for his exhibition, "Mike Kelley: The Uncanny" at Tate Liverpool. This exhibition featured Andy Warhol's Andy Warhol Robot.

== Bibliography ==
- Sexuality and mind : the role of the father and the mother in the psyche / Janine Chasseguet-Smirgel. New York: New York University Press, 1986. xi, 167 p.; 24 cm. ISBN 0-8147-1400-5
- Freud or Reich? : psychoanalysis and illusion / Janine Chasseguet-Smirgel and Béla Grunberger; translated by Claire Pajaczkowska. 1st U.S. ed. New Haven: Yale University Press, c1986. 252 p.; 23 cm. ISBN 0-300-03601-9
- Female sexuality; new psychoanalytic views / Janine Chasseguet-Smirgel, with C.-J. Luquet-Parat [and others] Foreword by Frederic Wyatt. (English version of Recherches psychanalytiques nouvelles sur la sexualité féminine. Ann Arbor, University of Michigan Press [1970] viii, 220 p. 24 cm. ISBN 0-472-21900-6
- Creativity and perversion / Janine Chasseguet-Smirgel; foreword by Otto Kernberg. 1st American ed. New York : W.W. Norton, 1984. ix, 172 p.; 22 cm. ISBN 0-393-01938-1
- The ego ideal: a psychoanalytic essay on the malady of the ideal / Janine Chasseguet-Smirgel; translated by Paul Barrows; introduction by Christopher Lasch. 1st American ed. (English version of Idéal du moi. New York : W.W. Norton, 1985, c1984. xvi, 271 p.; 23 cm. ISBN 0-393-01971-3
- La sexualité féminine, Payot Poche 1964, republished 2006, Payot-Rivages
- 'The Body as Mirror of the World', translated by Sophie Leighton. London: Free Association Books, 2005. ['Le corps comme miroir du monde' PUF, 2003].
- Pour une psychanalyse de l'art et de la créativité, Payot-Rivages, 1971
- Le cri des enfants sans voix: l'Holocauste et la deuxième génération, une perspective psychanalytique, 2001, Delachaux et Niestlé
- Ethique et esthétique de la perversion, republished 2006, Seyssel, Champ Vallon, ISBN 2-87673-446-X
- La maladie d'idéalité - Essai psychanalytique sur l'idéal du moi, Éd. L'Harmattan, Col. Emergences, 2000, ISBN 2-7384-8701-7
- Free Association Books have published English language translations of some titles.
- Bela Grunberger, Janine Chassegnet-Smirgel, l'univers contestataire, Paris: éditions in Press, 2004. [New edition of the 1969 print, with a new introduction.]

== See also ==
- Phallic monism
