= Idealization and devaluation =

Psychological defense mechanism

Psychoanalytic theory posits that an individual unable to integrate difficult feelings mobilizes specific defenses to overcome these feelings, which the individual perceives to be unbearable. The defense that effects (brings about) this process is called splitting. Splitting is the tendency to view events or people as either all bad or all good. When viewing people as all good, the individual is said to be using the defense mechanism idealization: a mental mechanism in which the person attributes exaggeratedly positive qualities to the self or others. When viewing people as all bad, the individual employs devaluation: attributing exaggeratedly negative qualities to the self or others.

In child development, idealization and devaluation are quite normal. During the childhood development stage, individuals become capable of perceiving others as complex structures, containing both good and bad components. If the development stage is interrupted (by early childhood trauma, for example), these defense mechanisms may persist into adulthood.

== Sigmund Freud ==
The term idealization first appeared in connection with Freud's definition of narcissism. Freud's vision was that all human infants pass through a phase of primary narcissism in which they assume they are the centre of their universe. To obtain the parents' love the child comes to do what they think the parents value. Internalizing these values the child forms an ego ideal. This ego ideal contains rules for good behaviour and standards of excellence toward which the ego has to strive. When the child cannot bear ambivalence between the real self and the ego ideal and defenses are used too often, it is called pathologic. Freud called this situation secondary narcissism, because the ego itself is idealized. Explanations of the idealization of others besides the self are sought in drive theory as well as in object relations theory. From the viewpoint of libidinal drives, idealization of other people is a "flowing-over" of narcissistic libido onto the object; from the viewpoint of self-object relations, the object representations (like that of the caregivers) were made more beautiful than they really were.

== Heinz Kohut ==
An extension of Freud's theory of narcissism came when Heinz Kohut presented the so-called "self-object transferences" of idealization and mirroring. To Kohut, idealization in childhood is a healthy mechanism. If the parents fail to provide appropriate opportunities for idealization (healthy narcissism) and mirroring (how to cope with reality), the child does not develop beyond a developmental stage in which they see themselves as grandiose but in which they also remain dependent on others to provide their self-esteem. Kohut stated that, with narcissistic patients, idealization of the self and the therapist should be allowed during therapy and then very gradually will diminish as a result of unavoidable optimal frustration.

== Otto Kernberg ==
Otto Kernberg has provided an extensive discussion of idealization, both in its defensive and adaptive aspects. He conceptualized idealization as involving a denial of unwanted characteristics of an object, then enhancing the object by projecting one's own libido or omnipotence on it. He proposed a developmental line with one end of the continuum being a normal form of idealization and the other end a pathological form. In the latter, the individual has a problem with object constancy and sees others as all good or all bad, thus bolstering idealization and devaluation. At this stage idealization is associated with borderline pathology. At the other end of the continuum, idealization is said to be a necessary precursor for feelings of mature love.

== See also ==
- Borderline personality disorder
- Cognitive dissonance
- Cycle of abuse
- Histrionic personality disorder
- Idolization
- Madonna–whore complex
- Minimisation (psychology)
- Narcissistic personality disorder
- Traumatic bonding
