= Drunk with power =

Drunk with power may refer to:

- "Drunk with Power", a song from the album Hear Nothing See Nothing Say Nothing by Discharge
- "Drunk with Power", a song from the album "V" Is for Vagina by Puscifer

== See also ==
- Megalomania (disambiguation)
