= Schwerbelastungskörper =

Hefty concrete cylinder in Germany

Coordinates: 52.4840°N 13.3716°E

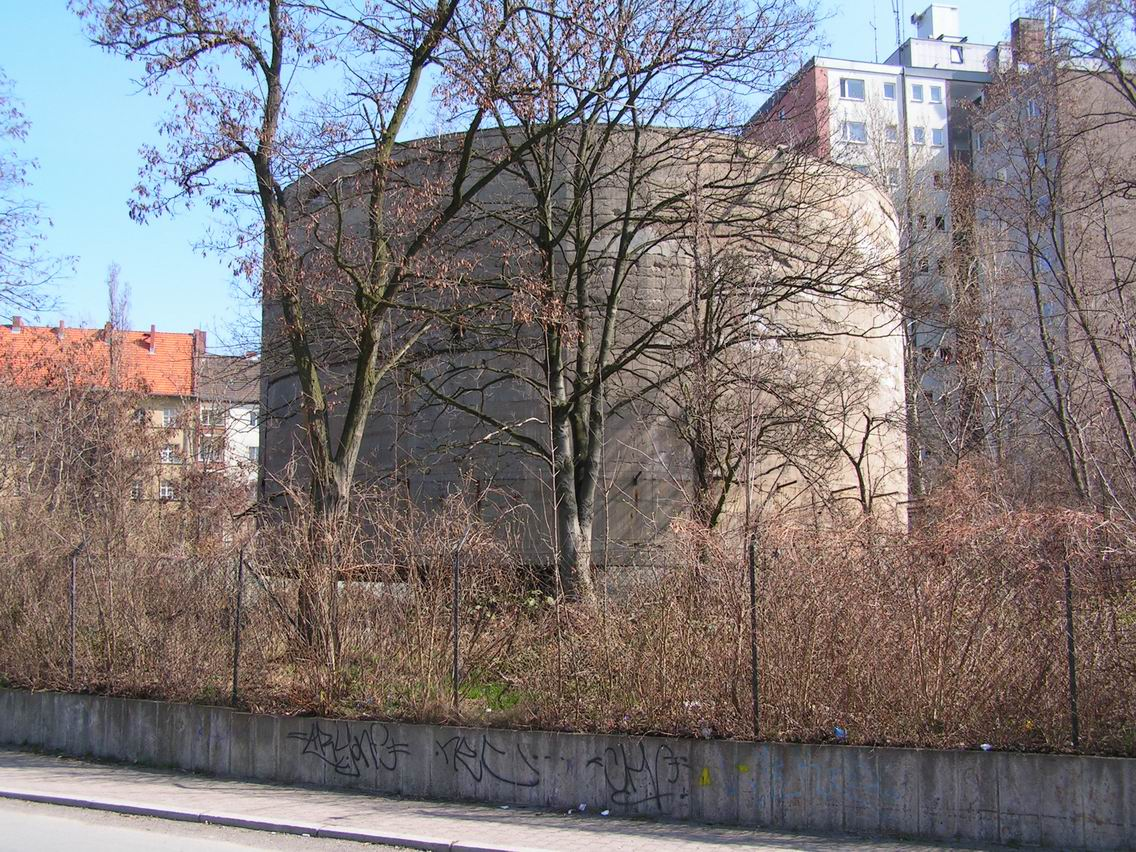
Schwerbelastungskörper

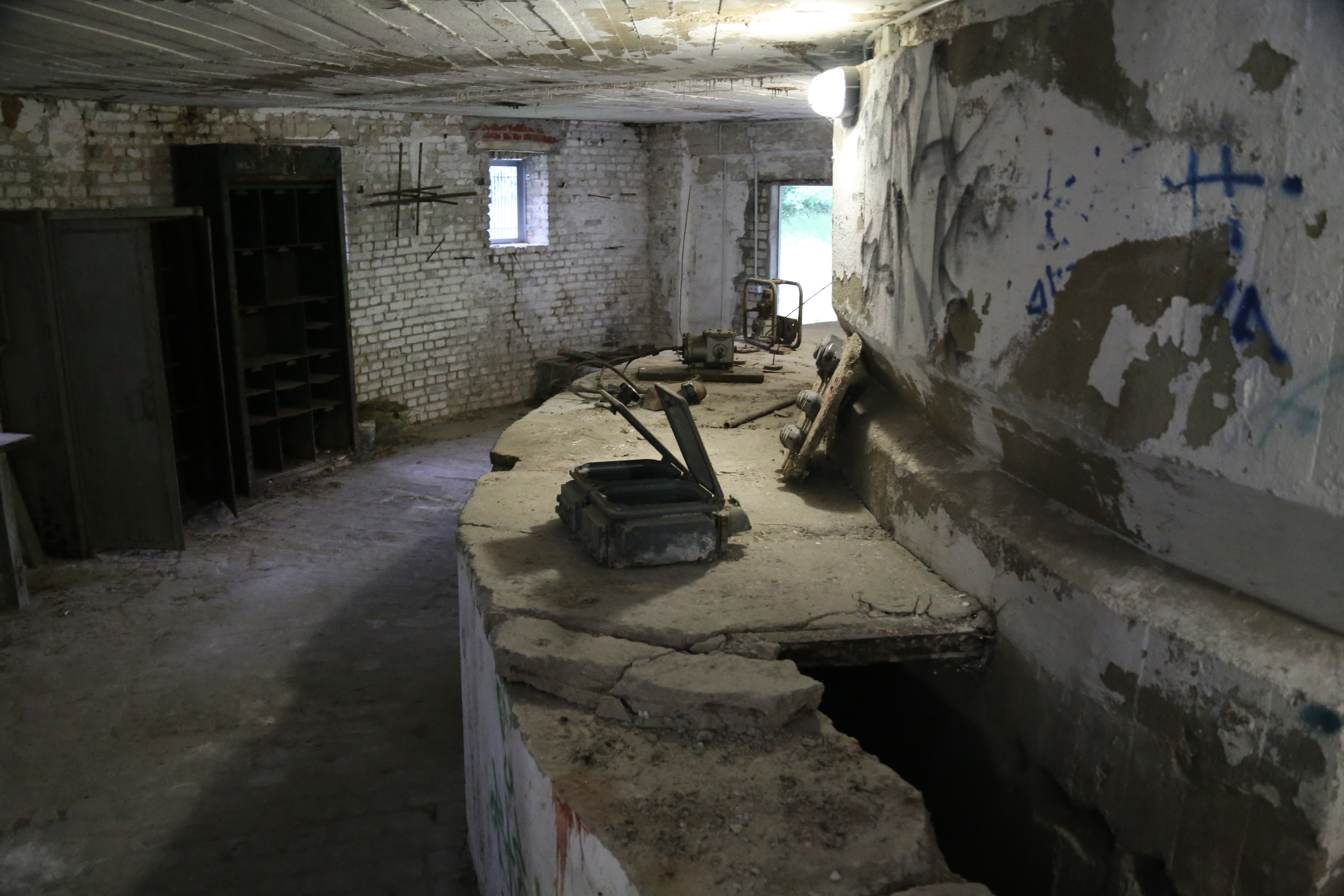
View of one of the unrestored instrument rooms inside the Schwerbelastungskörper

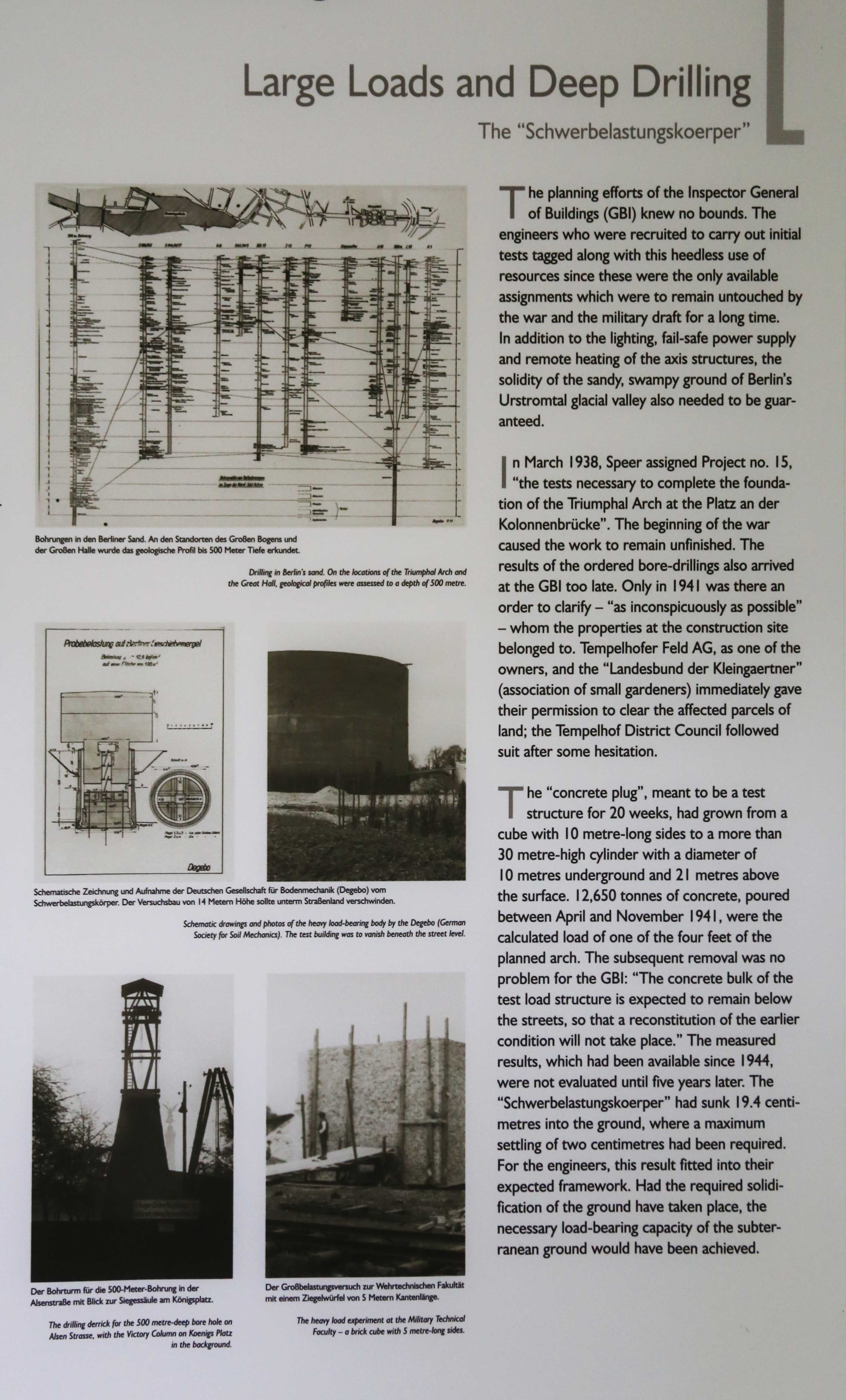
One of the posters at the site with information about Albert Speer's construction plans for the triumphal arch

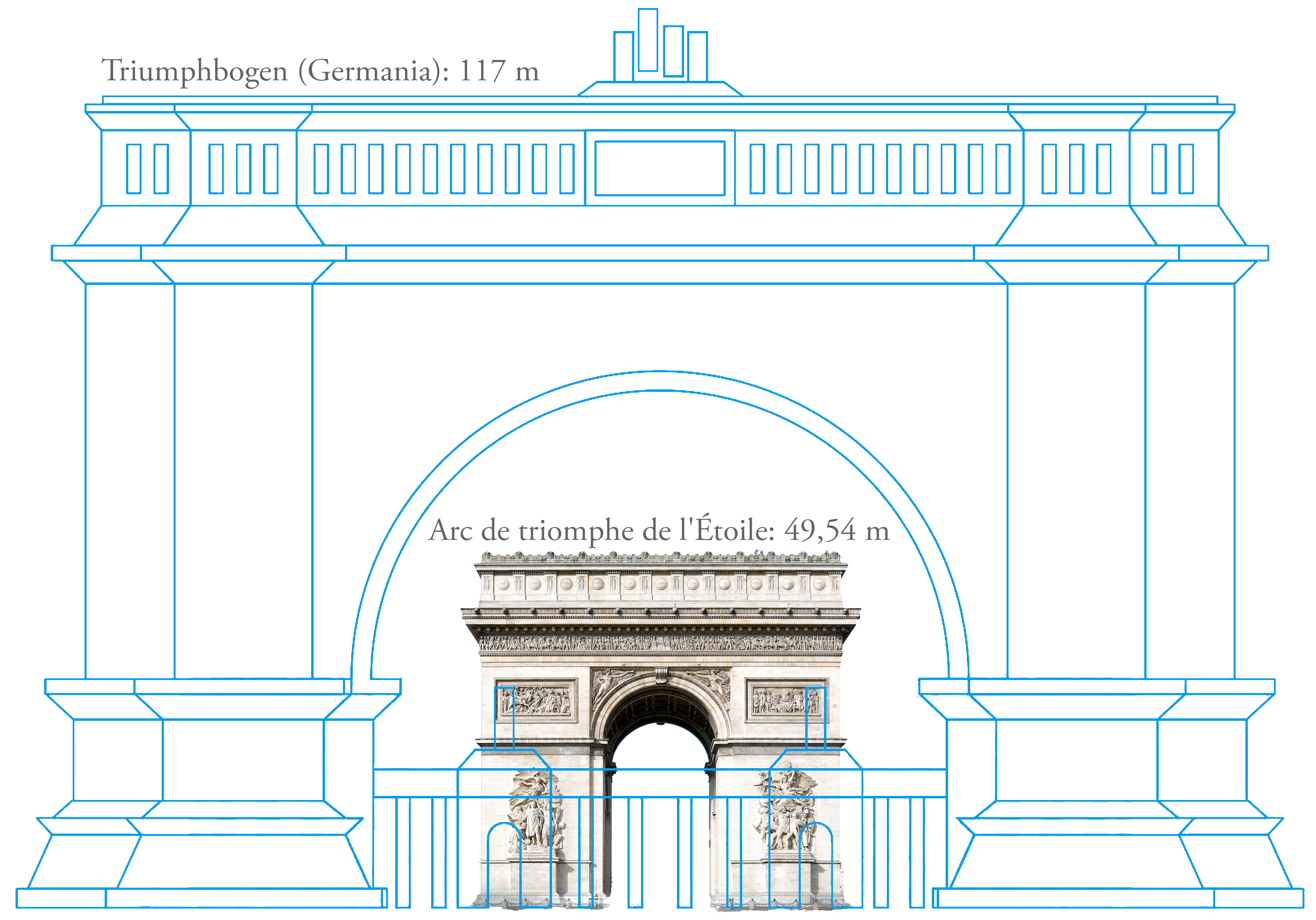
Height comparison between the triumphal arches of Germania and Paris

The Schwerbelastungskörper (German: "heavy load-exerting body") is a large concrete cylinder located at the intersection of Dudenstraße, General-Pape-Straße, and Loewenhardtdamm in the northwestern part of the borough of Tempelhof in Berlin, Germany. It was built by Adolf Hitler's chief architect Albert Speer to determine the feasibility of constructing large buildings on the area's marshy, sandy ground. Erected between 1941 and 1942 it was meant to test the ground for a massive triumphal arch on a nearby plot. The arch, in the style of the Nazi architectural movement, was to be more than twice as tall as the Arc de Triomphe in Paris, France. It was one component of a plan to redesign the center of Berlin as an imposing, monumental capital reflecting the spirit of Nazi Germany as envisioned by Hitler.

The Schwerbelastungskörper was built by Dyckerhoff & Widmann AG in 1941 at a cost of 400,000 Reichsmark (adjusted for purchasing power in today's currency around 1.69 million euros). It consists of a foundation with a diameter of 11 m (36 ft) that reaches 18.2 m (60 ft) into the ground and contains rooms which once housed instruments to measure ground subsidence caused by the weight of the cylinder, which was estimated as equivalent to the load calculated for one pillar of the intended arch. On this foundation a cylinder 14 m (46 ft) high and 21 m (69 ft) in diameter weighing 12,650 tonnes was erected at street level.

== Germania ==
The Schwerbelastungskörper is one of the few remaining vestiges of Adolf Hitler's plans to remake the city of Berlin. After being appointed chancellor in 1933, Hitler was committed to redesigning Berlin in a way that prominently displayed 'national emblems of racial community'. The reconstruction of Berlin was initiated alongside the idea that this rebuilding would create and represent an eternal marking of Hitler's legacy and power. Hitler was at the forefront of the decision-making when it came to what was being built, where something was being built, and determining whether or not the structure properly exemplified the ideals of National Socialist power. Hitler and his architect, Albert Speer, planned to make Berlin into a "Monumental World Capital" called Germania.

A defining feature of Hitler's plans to redesign Berlin was that everything must be on a massive scale. The buildings themselves needed to convey a strong sense of sturdiness and uniformity. These large-scale designs and lofty ambitions are represented in the Olympic Stadium intended to host the 1936 Olympics in Berlin. Hitler also planned for a massive Winter Stadium designed with the capacity to hold at least 250,000 German citizens. The size of the buildings is best exemplified in Hitler's plans for the Volkshalle. This unrealized dome designed by Hitler and Speer was intended to be an assembly hall standing at 290 m (950 ft) high and holding over 180,000 people. In 1945 when Speer discussed the designs for the Volkshalle with British and United States structural engineers, the engineers claimed the interior of the Volkshalle would have been so vast and grandiose that at full capacity, condensation from the breath of chanting soldiers would have formed clouds within the structure. The purpose of this hall was to create a permanent structure acting as the capital of the Third Reich, and the centerpiece of Germania that eternalized Hitler's strength, power, and influence.

With structures of such size being built on Berlin's soil for the first time, the ground needed to be tested. The Schwerbelastungskörper was built as a test for Hitler's Triumphal Arch. Speer was concerned that the ground would be too soft to hold something as dense and large as the Triumphal Arch, so the Schwerbelastungskörper was constructed to test the ground's capability to hold massive concrete structures. Hitler's architects and engineers planned to measure the depth that the Schwerbelastungskörper sank into the ground. Work on the new capital was soon discontinued due to the onset of World War II and measurements at the cylinder ceased in June 1944.

== Albert Speer ==
The Schwerbelastungskörper is one of the few structures that still stand today by Hitler's chief architect, Albert Speer. After he presented plans of the Triumphal Arch to Hitler, Speer quickly commissioned the construction of the Schwerbelastungskörper.

== Heavy load-exerting body ==
In 1941, construction for the Schwerbelastungskörper began for the purpose of testing the load-bearing capacity of the ground on the planned site of Hitler's Triumphal Arch. The Triumphal Arch was to be Hitler's focal point of Germania, therefore the Schwerbelastungskörper was a vital and necessary piece of construction. The Schwerbelastungskörper was constructed by the French prisoners of war in forced labor camps. If it were to sink less than 6 cm (2.4 in), the soil would be deemed sound enough for further construction without additional stabilization. An analysis of the meticulous measurements only took place in 1948, revealing that the cylinder had sunk some 19 cm (7.5 in) after two and a half years. The arch as conceived by Speer could only have been built after considerable prior stabilization of the ground.

The cylinder itself was never initially intended by Hitler or Speer to be destroyed, but to be subsequently buried under a new road. Interrupted by the war, these plans never came to fruition.

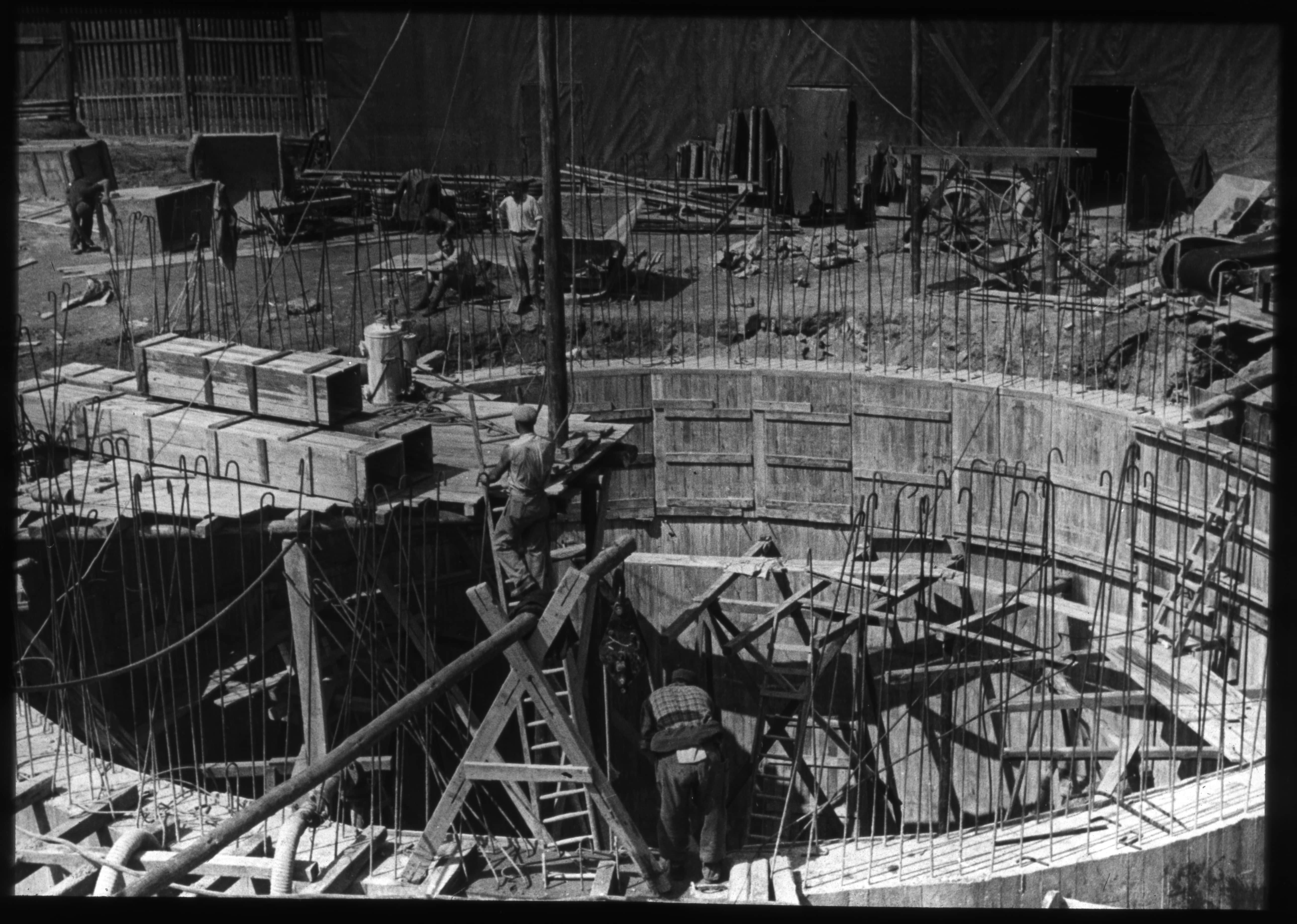
Construction in 1941

After the end of World War II, the Schwerbelastungskörper no longer served a practical purpose. Without any more plans for the Triumphal Arch, the Schwerbelastungskörper remained an immovable 12,650 tonne cylinder. The Schwerbelastungskörper was used under the auspices of Technische Universität Berlin as part of a project to compile data about the city's geologic foundation up until 1977.

== Public perception ==
Removal of the cylinder was considered after the war, but because of its mass as well as nearby train tracks and apartment buildings, the structure could not be safely demolished with explosives. Since 1995 the monumental cylinder has been protected as a historical monument representing the "only tangible relic of National Socialist urban planning". The Schwerbelastungskörper acts as a standing reminder of the basis of Hitler's and Speer's elaborate plans for Berlin. It is open to the public for viewing and guided tours.
