= Grandeur =

Grandeur may refer to:

- Grandiosity
- 70 mm Grandeur film
- Hyundai Grandeur, a car introduced in 1986
- Grandeur of the Seas, a cruise ship placed in service in 1996
- Seven Seas Grandeur, a cruise ship placed in service in 2023
- Grandeur Peak, a mountain in Utah, US
- Grandeur Terrace, a public housing estate in Tin Shui Wai, Hong Kong
- "Oh! The Grandeur", a 1999 indie rock album by Andrew Bird's Bowl of Fire

== See also ==
- Delusions of grandeur (disambiguation)
- Grand (disambiguation)
