= Andy Warhol Robot =

Self-portrait robot created by Andy Warhol

- Artist: Andy Warhol
- Year: c. 1981 - 1982, perhaps continuing until c. 1987
- Medium: Sculpture
- Subject: Andy Warhol

The Andy Warhol Robot is an animatronic robot created by Andy Warhol in 1981, as a self-portrait.

== History ==
Pop artist Andy Warhol had a fascination with Hollywood, television, and fame. His dream was to create his own stage production, Andy Warhol: A No Man Show, where a robotic life-size replica of himself with a "prosthetic resembling his face" could provide interviews and a performance to audiences across the world. Warhol claims his space despite being absent and the robot promoting his work without the need for his physical presence. Warhol pioneered the idea, so prevalent today, that "all publicity is good publicity". In 1981, Warhol worked with Peter Sellars and Lewis Allen to create his show as a traveling theater production that would read from Warhol's diaries and his books The Philosophy of Andy Warhol and Exposures. Inspired by a promotional automaton puppet of Muhammad Ali advertising a film in Penn Station, Allen proposed for the Andy Warhol Robot to act as human as possible to trick the public into believing it was Warhol himself. Warhol was quoted as saying, "I'd like to be a machine, wouldn't you?" Warhol's robotic double could be seen in philosopher Jean Baudrillard's terms as "the simulacra [sic] of Warhol replacing the artist himself." Bob Colacello, former Editor-in-Chief of Interview declared, "It really would have been the greatest thing that could have happened for Andy. It would have almost been like coming back from the dead. And he really loved the project. He sat for hours at some high-tech place in the San Fernando Valley where thy made a mold of his face and his hands… there's a whole photo session of it." Warhol's "relationship between man and machine, and in particular the increasing power and effects of media technologies, is perhaps the key problematic of Warhol’s work: in approaching the issues raised and in exploring how they resurface across his art in various media, the concept of telepresence proves particularly useful." The term comes from the work of cultural theorist Paul Virilio."

=== Pop culture ===
The Andy Warhol Robot was also featured in the Netflix show The Andy Warhol Diaries by Andrew Rossi. Rossi shared with Entertainment Weekly that Warhol cultivated his image in the 1960s during his time at The Factory as an "asexual robot." This led Rossi to create an AI voice for Warhol in the series from conversations between Warhol and his friend Pat Hackett, performed by actor Bill Irwin. Warhol was quoted as saying, "Machines have less problems," "‘I do have feelings, but I wish I didn’t," and, "the reason I’m painting this way is that I want to be a machine."

Pop star Beyoncé's Renaissance World Tour set was designed with Warhol's Factory and robot in mind including dancing robot arms "shot through with the silver-sequinned joy, liberty, and luminosity of LGBTQ+ ball culture."

=== Influence ===
Video and performance artist Nam June Paik, considered the "Father of Video Art" created his own Andy Warhol Robot (1994), it is currently in the collection of the Kunstmuseum Wolfsburg. Paik's robot however is not a recreation of Andy Warhol's physique, but an assemblage of television screens broadcasting images of Warhol's works and various components that exemplify Wahol's artistic oeuvre. Paik began making robots in 1963, and in 1982 for his retrospective at the Whitney Museum his first robot, Robot K-456, was displayed.

== Exhibitions ==
=== Mike Kelley: The Uncanny ===
The Andy Warhol Robot was featured in an exhibition, "Mike Kelley: The Uncanny", by American artist Mike Kelley at the Tate Liverpool and Mumok in 2004. Frieze (magazine) writes, "Taking its cue from the resurgence of figurative sculpture in the late 1980s and early 1990s, and Sigmund Freud's essay 'The Uncanny' (1919), the exhibition brings together mannequin-related artworks, mostly from the 1960s onwards," including from ancient Egypt to the early 2000s. In Freud's 'The Uncanny,' he writes, "It may be true that the uncanny is nothing else than a hidden, familiar thing that has undergone repression and then emerged from it." Kelley explores "memory, recollection, horror and anxiety through the juxtaposition of a highly personal collection of objects with realist figurative sculpture." Kelley remarks in his essay for the exhibition, "works develop a life of their own by virtue of their existence in the world outside of my control," and "I had intended to rework the original essay for 'The Uncanny,' "Playing with Dead Things," into dialogue form for a theater piece but never got around to it," akin to Warhol's urgings for his robot theater piece with Allen and Sellars. Kelley also makes reference to Jack Burnham who writes, "the liberalizing tendencies of modern art and the discoveries of archaeology finally compelled historians to consider the aesthetic merits of [substratum figures as a fine art] and an increasing range of other anthropomorphic forms," and Janine Chasseguet-Smirgel who shares, "lying between life and death, animated and mechanic, hybrid creatures and creatures to which hubris gave birth, they all may be liked to fetishes."

=== Exhibition history ===
- Mike Kelley: The Uncanny at Tate Liverpool, UK February 19 – May 3, 2004, Exhibition Catalog
- Mike Kelley: The Uncanny at Museum Moderner Kunst Stiftung Ludwig, Vienna, Austria July 15 – October 31, 2004
