= Germania (city) =

World capital city planned by Adolf Hitler

Coordinates: 52°31′00″N 13°23′20″E

Welthauptstadt Germania (pronounced [ˈvɛltˌhaʊ̯ptʃtat ɡɛʁˈmaːni̯a]; lit. 'World Capital Germania') was the projected renewal of the German capital Berlin during the Nazi period, as part of Adolf Hitler's vision for the future of Nazi Germany after the planned victory in World War II. It was to be the capital of his planned "Greater Germanic Reich". Albert Speer, the "first architect of the Third Reich", produced many of the plans for the rebuilt city in his capacity as overseer of the project, only a small portion of which was realised between 1938 and 1943.

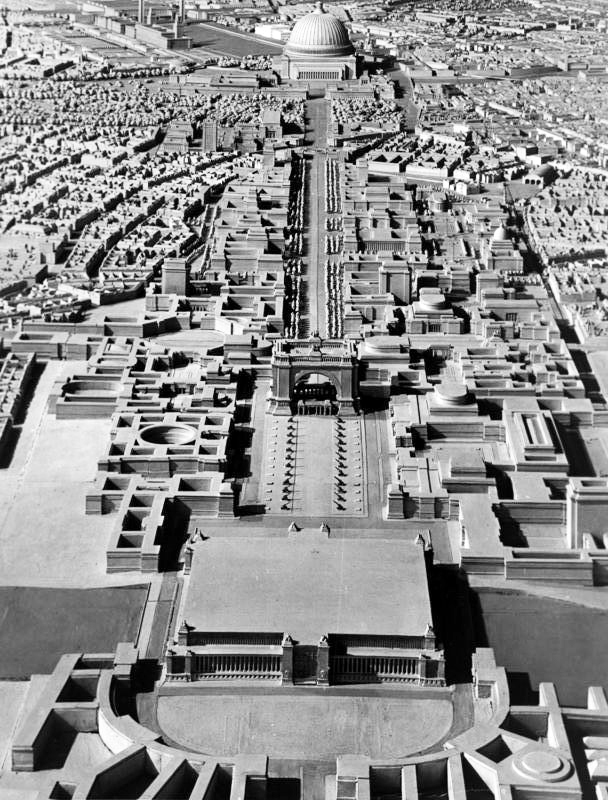
Model of Adolf Hitler's plan for Berlin formulated under the direction of Albert Speer, looking north toward the Volkshalle at the top of the frame

Some of the projects were completed, such as the creation of a great East–West city axis, which included broadening Charlottenburger Chaußee (today Straße des 17. Juni) and placing the Berlin Victory Column in the centre, far away from the Reichstag, where it originally stood. Other projects, however, such as the creation of the "People's Hall" (Volkshalle), had to be shelved due to the beginning of war, although a great number of the old buildings in many of the planned construction areas were already demolished before the war. The Second World War and Nazi Germany's defeat by the Allies ended development of the concept.

== Name ==
Hitler conceived of rebuilding Berlin to be the capital of the new world he would be instrumental in creating, and provided the name for it, 'Germania'. According to records of Hitler's "table talk" of 8 June 1942, Hitler's purpose in the renaming was to give a Greater Germanic world empire of the New Order a clear central point:

Just as the Bavarians and the Prussians had to be impressed by Bismarck of the German idea, so too must the Germanic peoples of Continental Europe be programmatically steered towards the Germanic concept. [Hitler] even considers it good that by renaming the Reich capital Berlin into 'Germania', we'll have given considerable driving force to this task. The name Germania for the Reich capital would be very appropriate, for in spite of how far removed those belonging to the Germanic racial core will be, this capital will instill a sense of unity.

Hitler described his vision for the city several months earlier:

As world capital Berlin will only be comparable with Ancient Egypt, Babylon, and Rome! What is London, what is Paris compared to that!

The official plan for rebuilding Berlin, with Albert Speer in charge, was called the "Comprehensive Construction Plan for the Reich Capital" (Gesamtbauplan für die Reichshauptstadt).

== Planning ==
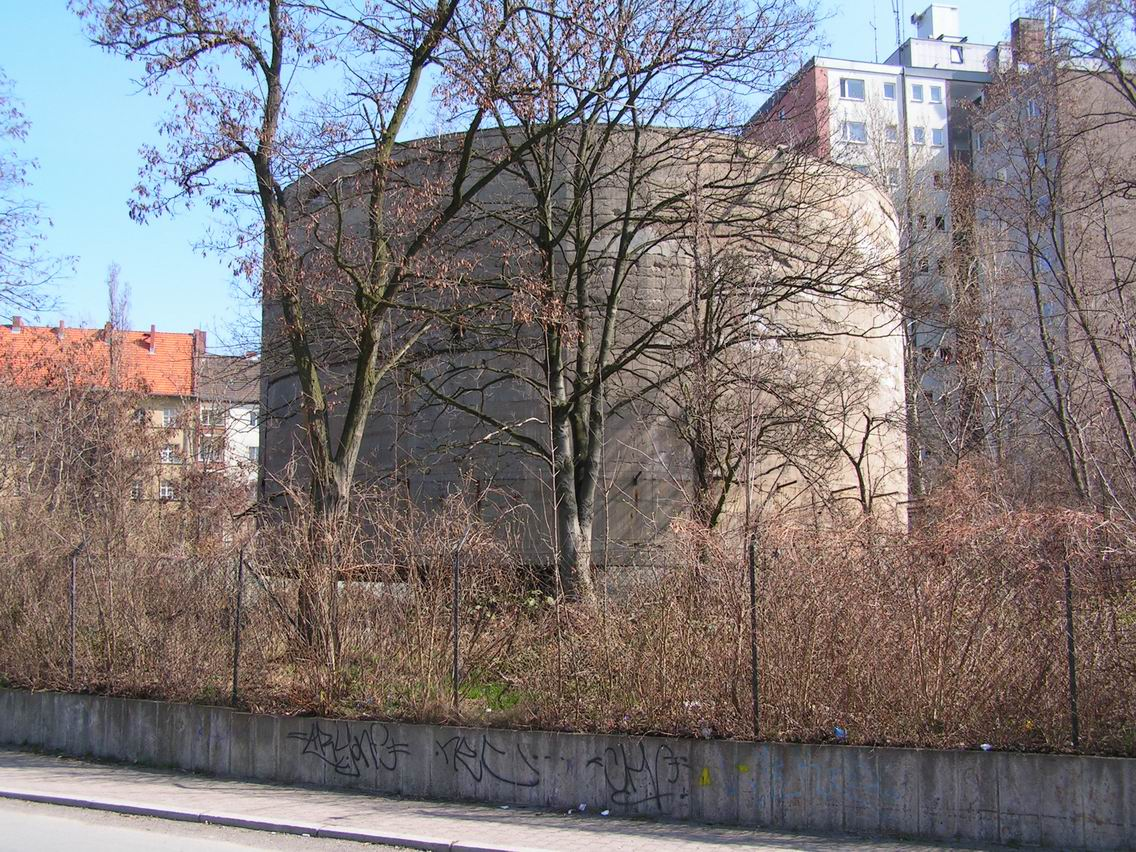
The Schwerbelastungskörper was built to determine if the unconsolidated ground could support the weight of the planned triumphal arch.

Doubts persisted at the time as to whether the marshy Berlin ground could have taken the immense weight of the proposed projects, leading to the construction of an exploration building (Schwerbelastungskörper, literal translation: heavy load-bearing body), which still exists near the site where the Arch of Triumph would have been built. The Schwerbelastungskörper is an extremely heavy block of concrete used by the architects to test how much weight the ground was able to carry. Instruments monitored how far the block sank into the ground. The Schwerbelastungskörper sank 18 cm (7 1/8 in) in the three years it was to be used for testing, compared to a maximum allowable settlement of 6 cm (2 3/8 in). Using the evidence gathered by these gargantuan devices, it is unlikely the soil could have supported such structures without further preparation. The plan was to cover the Schwerbelastungskörper by building a bridge over it. The arch would have been nearby, but problems with the axis running through infrastructure would have made it difficult to establish any convenient location.

Speer was rebuked by Martin Bormann when he contacted Protestant and Catholic authorities regarding churches in the new building districts. According to Bormann, they were not to be included.

== Demolition ==
The razing of old buildings to make way for the reconstruction of Berlin began in 1938 in various places around the city. This included the Alsen district, where the Great Hall would stand, and the Tiergarten district, where Speer planned to build the House for German Foreign Transport, and where the Kaiser-Wilhelm-Strasse would intersect with the great East-West Axis which was to be built. The East-West Axis was completed in time for Hitler's 50th birthday celebration a year later, in 1939, when Speer ceremoniously presented it to Hitler with the words "My Führer. I would like to report the completion of the east-west axis. May the work speak for itself."

== Construction and halt ==
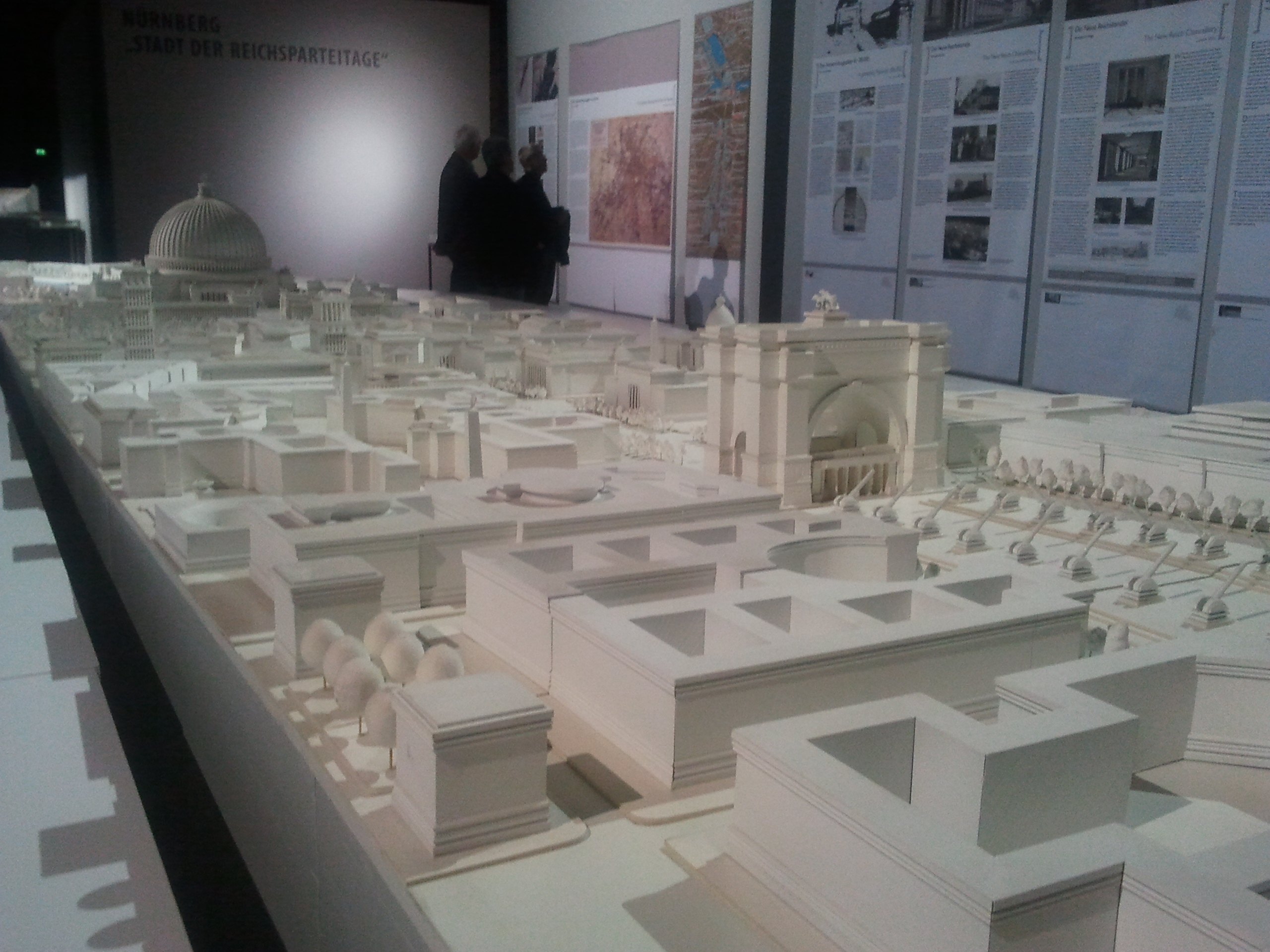
A model of Germania

Speer designed a new Chancellery, which included a vast hall designed to be twice as long as the Hall of Mirrors in the Palace of Versailles. Hitler wanted him to build a third, even larger Chancellery, although it was never begun. The second Chancellery was destroyed by the Red Army in 1945.

At the beginning of World War II, with the German invasion of Poland in 1939, construction was suspended, to be resumed after the "clear German victory". When France was defeated in 1940, Hitler visited Paris briefly with Speer and a few chosen others, the Führer's desire to "give Berlin a new face" was revitalised, and the work was redoubled at his command. At Speer's instigation, Hitler signed a decree which read:

In the shortest possible time Berlin must be redeveloped and acquire the form that is its due through the greatness of our victory as the capital of a powerful new empire. In the completion of what is now the country's most important architectural task I see the most significant contribution to our final victory. I expect that it will be completed by the year 1950. [emphasis in the original]

After serious setbacks in the German invasion of the Soviet Union, which Hitler had initially seen as another blitzkrieg ("lightning war"), construction on "Germania" was halted permanently in March 1943.

== Planned sites ==
=== Avenue of Splendors ===
Berlin was to be reorganised along a central 5-kilometre-long (3 mi) boulevard known as the Prachtallee ("Avenue/Boulevard of Splendor(s)"). This would run south from a crossroads with the East-West Axis close to the Brandenburg Gate, following the course of the old Siegesallee through the Tiergarten before continuing down to an area just west of Tempelhof Airport. This new North-South Axis would have served as a parade ground, and have been closed off to traffic. Vehicles would have instead been diverted into an underground highway running directly underneath the parade route; sections of this highway's tunnel structure were built, and still exist today. No work was ever begun above ground although Speer did relocate the Siegesallee to another part of the Tiergarten in 1938 in preparation for the avenue's construction.

The plan also called for the building of two new large railway stations as the planned North-South Axis would have severed the tracks leading to the old Anhalter and Potsdamer stations, forcing their closure. These new stations would be built on the city's main Hundekopf (dog's head) geography S-Bahn ring with the Nordbahnhof in Wedding and the larger Südbahnhof in Tempelhof-Schöneberg at the southern end of the avenue. The Anhalter Bahnhof, no longer used as a railway station, would have been turned into a swimming pool.

=== Großer Platz ===
At the northern end of the avenue on the site of the Königsplatz (now the Platz der Republik) there was to be a large open forum known as Großer Platz ("Grand Plaza") with an area of around 350,000 square metres (3,800,000 sq ft). This square was to be surrounded by the grandest buildings of all, with the Führer's palace on the west side on the site of the former Kroll Opera House, the 1894 Reichstag building on the east side, and the third Reich Chancellery and high command of the German Army on the south side (on either side of the square's entrance from the Avenue of Splendours). On the north side of the plaza, straddling the River Spree, Speer planned to build the centrepiece of the new Berlin, an enormous domed building, the Volkshalle (people's hall), designed by Hitler himself. Had it been built, the Volkshalle would have still been the largest enclosed space in the world today. Although war came before work could begin, all the necessary land was acquired and the engineering plans were worked out. The building would have been over 200 metres (660 ft) high and 250 metres (820 ft) in diameter, sixteen times larger than the dome of St. Peter's Basilica.

=== Triumphal Arch ===
Towards the southern end of the avenue would be a triumphal arch based on the Arc de Triomphe in Paris, but again, much larger; it would be almost one hundred metres (330 ft) high, and the Arc de Triomphe (at the time the largest triumphal arch in existence) could have fit inside its opening, evidently with the intention of replacing the rather long history associated with this Arch and in particular the unique ceremonies, with reference to the history of France, connected with it. As a result of the occupation of Berlin by Soviet troops in 1945, a memorial was constructed with two thousand of the Soviet dead buried there in line with this proposed 'Triumphal Arch'. It had been intended that inside this generously proportioned structure the names of the 1,800,000 German dead of the First World War should be carved.

== See also ==
- Fascist architecture
- Führer city – other cities in Germany and Austria planned for rebuilding
- EUR, Rome – District in Rome planned by Benito Mussolini to celebrate the twentieth anniversary of Fascism. It was designed to be the new city centre
- Global city
- Nazi architecture
- Nordstern (city)
- Speer und Er
- Totalitarian architecture
- Der Untergang
- Volkshalle – the Great Hall
