= History of narcissism =

The concept of excessive selfishness has been recognized throughout history. The term "narcissism" is derived from the Greek mythology of Narcissus, but was only coined at the close of the nineteenth century.

Since then, narcissism has become a household word; in analytic literature, given the great preoccupation with the subject, the term is used more than almost any other'.

The meaning of narcissism has changed over time. Today narcissism "refers to an interest in or concern with the self along a broad continuum, from healthy to pathological ... including such concepts as self-esteem, self-system, and self-representation, and true or false self".

== Before Freud ==
In Greek mythology, Narcissus was a handsome youth who rejected the desperate advances of the nymph Echo. As punishment, he was doomed to fall in love with his own reflection in a pool of water. Unable to consummate his love, Narcissus 'lay gazing enraptured into the pool, hour after hour', and finally pined away, changing into a flower that bears his name, the narcissus.

The story was retold in Latin by Ovid in his Metamorphoses, in which form it would have great influence on medieval and Renaissance culture. 'Ovid's tale of Echo and Narcissus...weaves in and out of most of the English examples of the Ovidian narrative poem'; and 'allusions to the story of Narcissus...play a large part in the poetics of the Sonnets' of Shakespeare. Here the term used was 'self-love...Feed'st thy light's flame with self-substantial fuel'. Francis Bacon used the same term: 'it is the nature of extreme self-lovers, as they will set a house on fire, and it were but to roast their eggs...those that (as Cicero says of Pompey) are sui amantes sine rivali...lovers of themselves without rivals'.

At the start of the nineteenth century Byron used the same term, describing how, "Self-love for ever creeps out, like a snake, to sting anything which happens...to stumble on it." while Baudelaire wrote of 'as vigorous a growth in the heart of natural man as self-love', as well as of those who 'like Narcissuses of fat-headedness...are contemplating the crowd, as though it were a river, offering them their own image'.

By mid-century, however, egotism was perhaps an equally common expression for self-absorption: 'egotists...made acutely conscious of a self, by the torture in which it dwells'—though still with 'curious suggestions of the Narcissus legend' in the background.

At the century's close, the term as we now know it finally emerged, with Havelock Ellis, the English sexologist, writing a short paper in 1927 on its coining, in which he 'argued that the priority should in fact be divided between himself and Paul Näcke, explaining that the term "narcissus-like" had been used by him in 1898 as a description of a psychological attitude, and that Näcke in 1899 had introduced the term Narcismus to describe a sexual perversion'.

In 1911 Otto Rank published the first psychoanalytical paper specifically concerned with narcissism, linking it to vanity and self-admiration.

== Freud ==
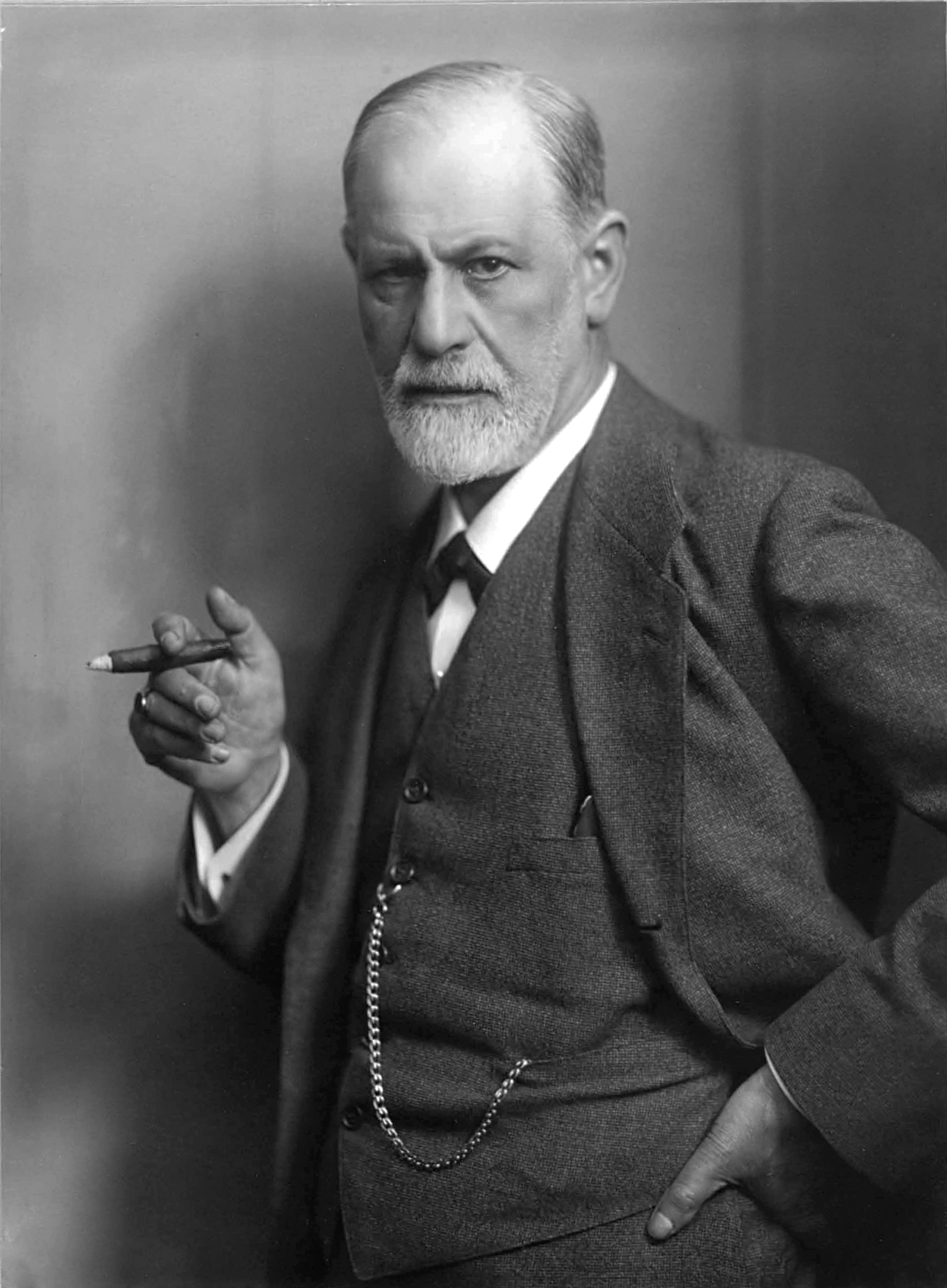
Sigmund Freud, by Max Halberstadt, 1914

According to Ernest Jones, in 1909 Freud declared that "narcissism was a necessary intermediate stage between auto-erotism and object-love". The following year in his "Leonardo" he described publicly for the first time how "the growing youngster...finds his love objects on the path of narcissism, since Greek myths call a youth Narcissus, whom nothing pleased so much as his own mirror image". Although Freud only published a single paper exclusively devoted to narcissism, called On Narcissism: An Introduction (1914), the concept took on an increasingly central place in his thinking.

=== Primary narcissism ===
Freud suggested that exclusive self-love might not be as abnormal as previously thought and might even be a common component in the human psyche. He argued that narcissism "is the libidinal complement to the egoism of the instinct of self-preservation." He referred to this as primary narcissism.

According to Freud, people are born without a sense of themselves as individuals, or ego. The ego develops during infancy and the early part of childhood, when the outside world, usually in the form of parental communications, definitions and expectations, intrudes upon primary narcissism, teaching the individual about the nature of his or her social environment, from which the ego ideal, an image of the perfect self towards which the ego should aspire, can be formed. "As it evolved, the ego distanced itself from primary narcissism, formed an ego-ideal, and proceeded to cathect objects".

Freud regarded all libidinous drives as fundamentally sexual and suggested that ego libido (libido directed inwards to the self) cannot always be clearly distinguished from object-libido (libido directed to persons or objects outside oneself).

=== Secondary narcissism ===
According to Freud, secondary narcissism occurs when libido is withdrawn from objects outside the self, above all the mother, producing a relationship to social reality that includes the potential for megalomania. "This megalomania has no doubt come into being at the expense of object-libido....This leads us to look upon the narcissism which arises through the drawing on of object-cathexes as a secondary one, superimposed upon a primary narcissism". For Freud, while both primary and secondary narcissism emerge in normal human development, problems in the transition from one to the other can lead to pathological narcissistic disorders in adulthood.

"This state of secondary narcissism constituted object relations of the narcissistic type", according to Freud. He went on to explore this further in Mourning and Melancholia—considered one of Freud's most profound contributions to object relations theory, elucidating the overall principles of object relations and narcissism as concepts.

=== Narcissism, relationships and self-worth ===
According to Freud, to care for someone is to convert ego-libido into object-libido by giving some self-love to another person, which leaves less ego-libido available for primary narcissism and protecting and nurturing the self. When that affection is returned so is the libido, thus restoring primary narcissism and self-worth. Any failure to achieve, or disruption of, this balance causes psychological disturbances. In such a case, primary narcissism can be restored only by withdrawing object-libido (also called object-love) to replenish ego-libido.

== Later psychoanalysts ==
=== Karen Horney ===
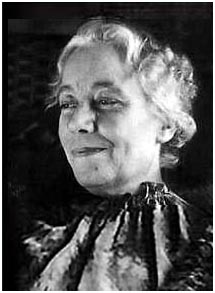
Karen Horney

Karen Horney saw narcissism quite differently from Freud, Kohut and other mainstream psychoanalytic theorists in that she did not posit a primary narcissism but saw the narcissistic personality as the product of a certain kind of early environment acting on a certain kind of temperament. For her, narcissistic needs and tendencies are not inherent in human nature.

Narcissism is different from Horney's other major defensive strategies or solutions in that it is not compensatory. Self-idealization is compensatory in her theory, but it differs from narcissism. All the defensive strategies involve self-idealization, but in the narcissistic solution it tends to be the product of indulgence rather than of deprivation. The narcissist's self-esteem is not strong, however, because it is not based on genuine accomplishments.

=== Heinz Kohut ===
Heinz Kohut explored further the implications of Freud's perception of narcissism. He maintained that a child will tend to fantasize about having a grandiose self and ideal parents. He claimed that deep down, all people retain a belief in their own perfection and the perfection of anything they are part of. As a person matures, grandiosity gives way to self-esteem, and the idealization of the parent becomes the framework for core values. It is when psychological trauma disrupts this process that the most primitive and narcissistic version of the self remains unchanged. Kohut called such conditions narcissistic personality disorder, 'in which the merging with and detaching from an archaic self-object play the central role...narcissistic union with the idealized self-object'.

Kohut suggested narcissism as part of a stage in normal development, in which caregivers provide a strong and protective presence with which the child can identify that reinforces the child's growing sense of self by mirroring his good qualities. If the caregivers fail to provide adequately for their child, the child grows up with a brittle and flawed sense of self. 'Kohut's innovative pronouncement...became a veritable manifesto in the United States....The age of "normal narcissism" had arrived'

Kohut also saw beyond the negative and pathological aspects of narcissism, believing it is a component in the development of resilience, ideals and ambition once it has been transformed by life experiences or analysis—though critics objected that his theory of how 'we become attached to ideals and values, instead of to our own archaic selves...fits the individual who escapes from bad inner negativity into idealized objects outside'.

=== Otto Kernberg ===
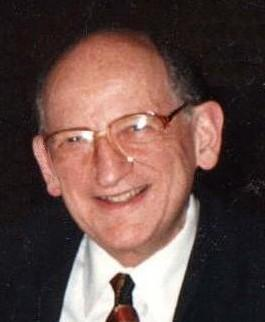
Otto F. Kernberg

Otto Kernberg uses the term narcissism to refer to the role of self in the regulation of self-esteem.

He believed normal, infantile narcissism depends on the affirmation of others and the acquisition of desirable and appealing objects, which should later develop into healthy, mature self-esteem. This healthy narcissism depends upon an integrated sense of self that incorporates images of the internalized affirmation of those close to the person and is regulated by the super ego and ego ideal, internal mental structures that assure the person of his worth and that he deserves his own respect.

The failure of infantile narcissism to develop in this healthy adult form becomes a pathology.

=== Object relations theory ===
'Melanie Klein's...descriptions of infantile omnipotence and megalomania provided important insights for the clinical understanding of narcissistic states. In 1963, writing on the psychopathology of narcissism, Herbert Rosenfeld was especially concerned to arrive at a better definition of object-relationships and their attendant defense mechanisms in narcissism'.

D. W. Winnicott's 'brilliant observations of the mother-child couple [also] throw considerable light on primary narcissism, which in the young child can be viewed as the extension of the mother's narcissism.

=== Jacques Lacan ===
Lacan—building on Freud's dictum that "all narcissistic impulses operate from the ego and have their permanent seat in the ego"—used his own concept of the mirror stage to explore the narcissistic ego in terms of "the essential structure it derives from its reference to the specular image...narcissism".

'Béla Grunberger drew attention to a double orientation of narcissism—as both a need for self-affirmation and a tendency to restore permanent dependency. The active presence of narcissism throughout life led Grunberger to suggest treating it as an autonomous factor (1971)'.

'Under the evocative title Life Narcissism, Death Narcissism (1983), André Green clarified the conflict surrounding the object of narcissism (whether a fantasy object or a real object) in its relationship to the ego. For Green, it was because narcissism affords the ego a certain degree of independence...that a lethal kind of narcissism must be considered, for the object is destroyed at the beginning of this process'; while in a further analysis, 'Green evokes physical narcissism, intellectual narcissism, and moral narcissism'—a set of divisions sometimes simplified into that between 'somatic narcissists who are obsessed with the body...[&] cerebral narcissists—people who build up their sense of magnificence out of an innate feeling of intellectual superiority'.

== Psychiatry ==
=== Diagnosis ===
Narcissistic personality disorder is a condition defined in DSM-5, made by the American Psychiatric Association.

The International Statistical Classification of Diseases and Related Health Problems, 10th Edition (ICD-10), of the World Health Organization (WHO), lists narcissistic personality disorder (NPD) under the category of "Other specific personality disorders". The ICD-11, due to be adopted on 1 January 2022, will merge all personality disorders into one, which can be coded as "Mild", "Moderate" or "Severe".

== Online usage ==
The success of the term narcissism has led to something of an "inflation of meanings....Some in fact exploited it as a handy term of abuse for modern culture or as a loose synonym for bloated self-esteem."

== See also ==
- Malignant narcissism
- Narcissism of small differences
- Narcissistic parents
- Narcissistic rage and narcissistic injury
- Narcissistic supply
