= Michael Kinsey =

American clinical psychologist, psychotherapist and author

Michael Kinsey PhD
- Education: The New School for Social Research (MA, PhD); Northwestern University (BA)
- Notable work: Deconstructing Narcissism: A Model of the Emotional Dynamics of the Narcissistic Personality; Transcendent Parenting: A Workbook for Parent's Sharing Children with Narcissists
- Awards: American Psychological Association Excellence in Psychology Award (2010)
- Website: https://mindsplain.com

Michael Kinsey is an American clinical psychologist, psychotherapist and author. He is known for his work with parent-child attachment, personality psychology, and abusive power and control in interpersonal relationships. He is also the founder and publisher of the psychology blog Mindsplain.

== Biography ==
=== Early life and education ===
He received his doctoral degree in clinical psychology from The New School for Social Research, where he was editor of The New School Psychology Bulletin from 2012 to 2013. He was a postdoctoral fellow at Lenox Hill Hospital and Williamsburg Therapy Group in Brooklyn.

He also trained in the World Trade Center Mental Health Program at Mount Sinai School of Medicine, The Bronx Lebanon Hospital Center, and the Baruch College Counseling Center.

== Career ==
From 2013 to 2017, he taught several undergraduate and graduate psychology courses at The New School, including fundamentals in personality psychology, diagnostic assessment, and abnormal psychology.

Kinsey is in private practice and is a staff psychologist at the Williamsburg Therapy Group.

In 2021, Dr. Kinsey held a workshop on the topic of The Dynamics of the Narcissistic Personality in the Context of Coercive Control at America's Conference To End Coercive Control. The workshop was based on his Model of the Emotional Dynamics of the Narcissistic Personality.

== Theory ==
=== Emotional dynamics of pathological narcissism ===
In Kinsey's model, narcissism is a personality trait that exists on a continuum and does not manifest uniformly. In its most extreme form, it may manifest as narcissistic personality disorder.

=== Healthy narcissism ===
Kinsey postulates that healthy narcissism is the ability to invest love in oneself and other people. It is neither exploitative nor harmful to self or others, whereas with narcissistic personality disorder love is self-directed only.

He explains:

We’re not all narcissistic in the same way, or to the same degree, but we do all have narcissistic tendencies. Not only is self-absorption universal, it's also a vital aspect of health.

Kinsey identifies the main attributes of healthy narcissism as:

1. Being able to admire others and accept admiration.
2. Believing in the importance of your contributions.
3. Feeling gratitude and appreciation not guilt.
4. Empathizing with others but prioritize self.
5. Embodying self-efficacy, persistence and resilience.
6. Respecting the self in health habits and boundaries.
7. Being confident in being seen.
8. Tolerating other's disapproval.
9. Creating goals and pursue them with desire.
10. Being attentive to the external world.
11. Being aware of emotions.

== Works ==
Kinsey is the author of Transcendent Parenting: A Workbook for Parents Sharing Children with Narcissists and a children's book called Dreams of Zugunruhe.

=== Articles ===
In 2021, his article What are Attachment Styles and How Do They Influence Adult Behavior appeared in Choosing Therapy.

== See also ==
- Attachment theory
- Child development
- Culture of Narcissism
- Healthy narcissism
- Narcissism
