= On Narcissism =

1914 essay by Sigmund Freud

- The German edition
- Author: Sigmund Freud
- Original title: Zur Einführung des Narzißmus
- Language: German

On Narcissism (German: Zur Einführung des Narzißmus) is a 1914 essay by Sigmund Freud, the founder of psychoanalysis.

In the paper, Freud sums up his earlier discussions on the subject of narcissism, considers its place in sexual development, and looks at the deeper problems of the relation between the ego and external objects, reconsidering the libido theory to draw a new distinction between 'ego-libido' and 'object-libido'. The essay is notable for its introduction of the idea of the 'ego ideal', and the self-observing agency related to it, which would later be developed as the concept of the superego.

Freud also looks at the concept in relation to his disputes with the theories of Carl Jung and Alfred Adler. One of his motives for writing the essay was probably to propose the concept of narcissism as an alternative to Jung's non-sexual 'libido' and Adler's 'masculine protest'.

== Primary and secondary narcissism ==
Freud postulates a universal "primary narcissism" that is a phase of sexual development in early infancy (described in an earlier work as a necessary intermediate stage between auto-eroticism and object-love, love for others). Portions of this 'self-love' or ego-libido are, at later stages of development, expressed outwardly, or "given off" toward others.

Largely as a result of his observation of the peculiar nature of the schizophrenic's relation to themselves and the world, he also postulates a "secondary narcissism". Observing that the two fundamental qualities of such patients were megalomania and withdrawal of interest from the real world of people and things, he suggests that: "the libido that has been withdrawn from the external world has been directed to the ego, and thus gives rise to an attitude which may be called narcissism." It is a secondary narcissism because it is not a new creation but a magnification of an already existing condition (primary narcissism).

== Ego-libido and object-libido ==
Prior to this essay, the libido theory focused on 'object-cathexes' - the emanations and withdrawals of libido relative to objects and others. Here Freud focuses for the first time on the antithesis between ego-libido and object-libido, noting that "the more one is employed, the more the other is depleted". The most extreme form of object-libido is the state of being in love: at the opposing end of the scale is paranoic fantasy. During the state of primary narcissism, the two forms of psychical energy are yet to be distinguished. It is only when there is object-cathexis that it becomes possible to "discriminate a sexual energy—the libido—from the energy of the ego-instincts".

== See also ==
- Egosyntonic and egodystonic
- History of narcissism
- Narcissistic withdrawal
