= Group Psychology and the Analysis of the Ego =

1921 book by Sigmund Freud

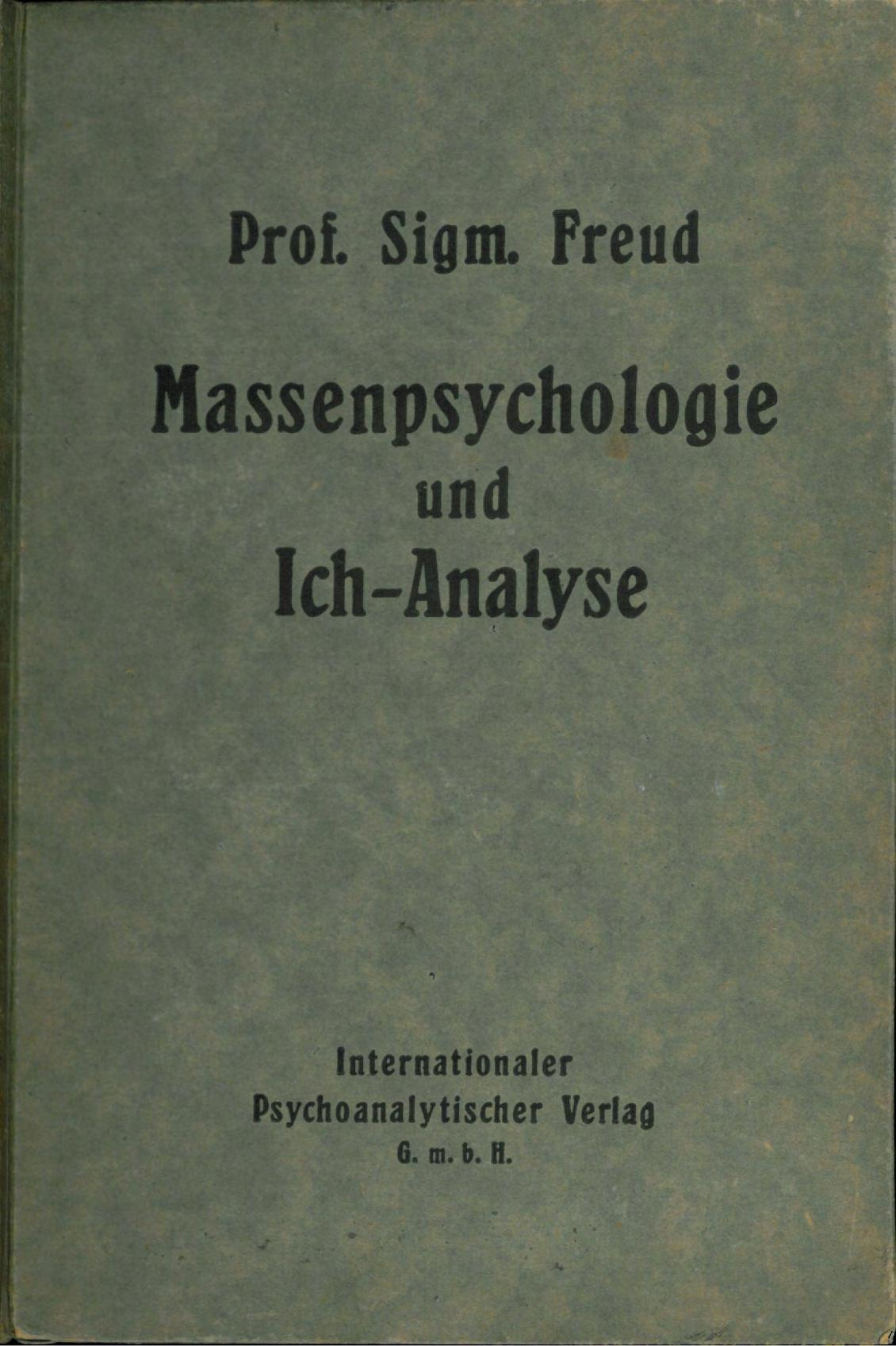
- Cover of the first edition of Massenpsychologie und Ich-Analyse
- Author: Sigmund Freud
- Language: German
- Subject: Psychoanalysis
- Published: 1921, by Internationaler Psychoanalytischer Verlag ("International Psychoanalytic Publishing House"), Vienna
- Publication place: Austria
- Pages: 140

Group Psychology and the Analysis of the Ego (German: Massenpsychologie und Ich-Analyse) is a 1921 book by Sigmund Freud, the founder of psychoanalysis.

In this monograph, Freud describes psychological mechanisms at work within mass movements. A mass, according to Freud, is a "temporary entity, consisting of heterogeneous elements that have joined together for a moment." He refers heavily to the writings of sociologist and psychologist Gustave Le Bon (1841–1931), summarizing his work at the beginning of the book in the chapter Le Bons Schilderung der Massenseele ("Le Bon's description of the group mind"). Like Le Bon, Freud says that as part of the mass, the individual acquires a sense of infinite power allowing him to act on impulses that he would otherwise have to curb as an isolated individual. These feelings of power and security allow the individual not only to act as part of the mass, but also to feel safety in numbers. This is accompanied, however, by a loss of conscious personality and a tendency of the individual to be infected by any emotion within the mass, and to amplify the emotion, in turn, by "mutual induction". Overall, the mass is "impulsive, changeable, and irritable. It is controlled almost exclusively by the unconscious."

Freud extensively quotes Le Bon, who explains that the state of the individual in the crowd is "hypnotic", with which Freud agrees. He adds that the contagion and the higher suggestibility are different kinds of change of the individual in de mass.

Freud distinguishes between two types of masses. One is the short-lived kind, characterized by a rapidly transient interest, such as a trend or fad. The other kind consists of more permanent and enduring masses, which are highly organized, such as a religion or the military. "The masses of the former type, so to speak, ride on the latter, like the short but high waves on the long swell of the sea." However, the same basic mental processes operate in both kinds of masses.

Freud refers back to his theory of instincts and believes that masses are held together by libidinal bonds. Each individual in the mass acts on impulses of love that are diverted from their original objectives. They pursue no direct sexual goal, but "do not therefore work less vigorously".

Freud initially called the (largely unconscious) identification with the other individuals of the mass, all of whom are drawn in the same way to the leader, a binding element. The ego perceives a significant similarity with others in the group and identifies with them. In addition, admiration and idealization of the leader of the group takes place through the process of idealization. The narcissistic libido is displaced to the object which is "loved because of its perfection which the individual has sought for his own ego". Also, a process of identification with the aggressor can take place, for example, as happens in regression.

Thus, Freud came to the conclusion: "A primary mass is a number of individuals who have put one and the same object in place of their ego ideal and consequently identify with each other."

== See also ==
- Philosophical anthropology
- Völkerpsychologie
