= Healthy narcissism =

Positive sense of self

Healthy narcissism is a positive sense of self that is in alignment with the greater good. The concept of healthy narcissism was coined by Paul Federn and gained prominence in the 1970s through the research of Heinz Kohut and Otto Kernberg. It developed slowly out of the psychoanalytic tradition, and became popular in the late twentieth century.

The concept of healthy narcissism is used in clinical psychology and popular psychology as an aid to self-assertion and success. It has indeed been suggested that it is useful to think of a continuum of narcissism, ranging from deficient to healthy to pathological, with stable narcissism and destructive narcissism as stopping-points in between. Recent scientific work suggests that healthy narcissism reflects an abundance of agentic/self-enhancing features and a relative absence of antagonistic/other-derogating elements.

== Modern research ==
=== Narcissistic Admiration and Rivalry Concept (NARC) ===
Narcissism, more specifically grandiose narcissism, has been variously described as a "double-edged sword" and a "mixed blessing" in that it has both adaptive (high self-esteem, assertiveness, popularity) and maladaptive correlates (violence, antisocial behavior, risk-taking). This contradictory assortment of correlates led psychologist Mitja D. Back and colleagues to devise the Narcissistic Admiration and Rivalry Concept (NARC), a model based on normative self-regulation theories. Such theories suggest that individuals regulate their self-esteem through two strategies: self-enhancement (advancing oneself or promoting positive self-views) and self-protection (fending off negative views of the self). Back et al. reason that because narcissistic self-views are inflated, so too must be the processes of self-regulation. The NARC suggests that grandiose narcissism is composed of two distinct dimensions, each with a cognitive, affective-motivational, and behavioral aspect:

The Two Faces of Narcissism
	Narcissistic Admiration	Narcissistic Rivalry
Cognitive	Grandiosity	Devaluation
Affective-Motivational	Striving for Uniqueness	Striving for Supremacy
Behavioural	Charmingness	Aggressiveness

- Narcissistic admiration (ADM): an exaggerated style of self-enhancement defined by grandiose thoughts and fantasies (cognitive), optimistic striving for personal uniqueness, and an assertive, self-assured and charming interpersonal style (behavioral) conducive to social admiration and status acquisition, especially prestige-/competence-based status. ADM is thought of a self-regulation strategy that functions as a loop which maintains the grandiose self: grandiose self-related thoughts (e.g. "I am great", "I am a genius") are believed to strong feelings of uniqueness, specialness and superiority, which promote the desire to pursue and demonstrate the alleged grandiose qualities, which in turn result in their attempted demonstration in a charismatic and confident manner which results in praise and ego boosts, which re-trigger the grandiose thoughts and the cycle continues.
- Narcissistic rivalry (RIV): an exaggerated form of self-protection defined by devaluation of others (cognitive), striving for relative supremacy over others (affective-motivational), and an insensitive, hostile, and aggressive interpersonal style (behavioral) conducive to social conflict and status loss or challenge, especially dominance-/intimidation-based status. RIV also functions cyclically, with denigrating cognitions (e.g., "most people are idiots") resulting in a desire obtain relative status over others by 'putting them down' (i.e. perceiving and attempting to show that others are inferior or inadequate). When these efforts fail (either by success of the "rival" or exposure of one's antagonism), hostility and rage follow, conferring aggressive and demeaning behavior which confer conflict and ostracism, whereafter the individual denigrates others protect own ego, beginning the cycle anew.

In this sense specifically suggest that ADM is healthy narcissism, while RIV is associated with more destructive features. To test their hypotheses, they developed the 18-item Narcissistic Admiration and Rivalry Questionnaire (NARQ) and a 6-item short version (NARQ-S) which assess the two faces of narcissism and their cognitive, affective-motivational and behavioral facets.

All major aspects of the NARC have been empirically validated, with ADM showing consistently strong associations with high self-esteem, agentic extraversion, openness to experience, positive emotionality, and status, while RIV relates to unstable self-esteem, vulnerable narcissism, neuroticism, anger, psychopathy, and Machiavellianism. This pattern of results is consistent with the suggestion ADM, the self-aggrandizing and charismatic facet, is a healthy form of narcissism.

Even stronger evidence for ADM as healthy narcissism comes from suppressor effects and latent profile analyses. Specifically, when ADM and RIV are entered into regression models as predictors and their covariance is controlled for, ADM begins to show small-to-medium sized positive correlations with empathy, trust, forgiveness, gratitude and agreeableness, and shows inverse associations with narcissistic vulnerability and aggression (though it retains positive associations with entitlement and manipulativeness). Latent profile analysis, which allows for the detection specific groups or clusters of individuals based on their score across psychometric instruments, has found that individuals who score high on ADM but low on RIV show the highest self-esteem, empathy, and lowest psychopathy and impulsivity, even more so than individuals with low scores on both dimensions. A second group with moderate elevation on both facets showed the most maladaptive traits, while a fourth grouped yielded some evidence that very high levels of ADM may neutralize some of the destructive qualities of RIV.

== Historical and theoretical views ==
=== Freud on normal narcissism ===
Freud considered narcissism a natural part of the human makeup that, taken to extremes, prevents people from having meaningful relationships. He distinguished narcissism as "the libidinal complement to the egoism of the instinct of self-preservation". This self-preservation or desire and energy that drives one’s instinct to survive he referred to as a healthy trait termed primary narcissism.

=== Paul Federn ===
Paul Federn, an Austrian physician and psychoanalyst, and acolyte of Sigmund Freud introduced the concept of healthy narcissism in the 1930s. In 1928, he published "Narcissism in the Structure of the Ego," and in 1929 "The Ego as Subject and Object in Narcissism" (Das Ich als Subjekt und Objekt im Narzissmus). It was in these works that Federn introduced the concept of healthy narcissism to describe an adequate sense of self-love.

=== Heinz Kohut on healthy narcissism ===
Healthy narcissism was first conceptualized by Heinz Kohut, who used the descriptor "normal narcissism" and "normal narcissistic entitlement" to describe children's psychological development. Kohut's research showed that if early narcissistic needs could be adequately met, the individual would move on to what he called a "mature form of positive self-esteem; self-confidence" or healthy narcissism.

In Kohut's tradition, the features of healthy narcissism are:

1. Strong self-regard.
2. Empathy for others and recognition of their needs.
3. Authentic self-concept.
4. Self-respect and self-love.
5. Courage to abide criticism from others while maintaining positive self-regard.
6. Confidence to set and pursue goals and realize one's hopes and dreams.
7. Emotional resilience.
8. Healthy pride in self and one's accomplishments.
9. The ability to admire and be admired.

Neville Symington challenged Kohut's belief in positive narcissism, arguing that "we do not get positive narcissism without self-hatred or negative narcissism." Symington held that "it is meaningless to talk about healthy self-centeredness" – that being the core of narcissism.

=== Ernest Becker ===
In his 1974 Pulitzer Prize-winning book, The Denial of Death, anthropologist Ernest Becker held that "a working level of narcissism is inseparable from self-esteem, from a basic sense of self-worth".

According to Becker:

The child who is well nourished and loved develops, as we said, a sense of magical omnipotence, a sense of his own indestructibility, a feeling of proven power, and secure support. He can imagine himself, deep down, to be eternal. We might say that his repression of the idea of his own death is made easy for him because he is fortified against it in his very narcissistic vitality."

Furthermore, he described healthy narcissism as:

All too absorbing and relentless to be an aberration; it expresses the heart of the creature: the desire to stand out, to be the one in creation. When you combine natural narcissism with the basic need for self-esteem, you create a creature who has to feel himself an object of primary value: first in the universe, representing in himself all of life.

=== Ronnie Solan ===
Ronnie Solan uses the metaphor of narcissism as an emotional-immune system for safeguarding the familiarity and the well-being of the individual against invasion by foreign sensations (1998) and small differences (Freud 1929–1930).

The innate immunization vacillates between well-being, in the presence of the familiar, and alertness as well as vulnerability, facing the stranger. In childhood, the familiar is tempting, and the strangeness is intolerable from within (illness) or from outside (otherness). Hence, narcissistic immunization might be compared to the activity of the biological immunological system that identifies the familiar protein of the cell and rejects the foreign protein (bacteria, virus).

Thus, from infancy to adulthood, getting hurt emotionally is inevitable because the other, even if he or she is a familiar person and dear to us, is still a separate individual that asserts his otherness. The healthy narcissist succeeds in updating narcissistic data (such as acquaintance with the unfamiliar) and in enabling the recovery of self-familiarity from injury and psychic pains. Healthy narcissism activates immunologic process of restoring the stabilization of cohesiveness, integrity and vigorousness of the self and the restoration of the relationship with the other, despite its otherness.

Impaired functioning of narcissism fails to activate these narcissistic processes and arouses destructive reactions. Thus, the individual steadfastly maintains his anger toward the other that offended him, and might sever contact with him, even to the extent of exacting violent revenge, although this other might be dear to him, possibly leading through impaired narcissism to fragility and vulnerability of the self, to immature individuation, narcissistic disorders and pathological phenomena.

The healthy narcissism contributes to improving emotional intelligence as part of the process of adapting to changes; to intensifying curiosity and investigating the environment; to relating to otherness, and for enhancing joie de vivre.

=== Craig Malkin ===
Craig Malkin, a lecturer in psychology at Harvard Medical School, wrote about healthy narcissism in his book 'Rethinking Narcissism'. According to Malkin,

There is, in fact, such a thing as healthy narcissism. Over a quarter century of research shows cross-culturally that the vast majority of people around the world feel a little bit special. They see themselves through slightly rose colored glasses. To quote one researcher, "they feel exceptional or unique". When we look at the research, we're asked how we compare to others in terms of what’s intelligence, things like that, we tend to think that we are more attractive, more compassionate. We even think we are more human than the average person. When people feel that way, they feel more resilient, according to research, they feel more optimistic, they feel more able in our research to give and receive in relationships than people who don't have those rose colored glasses. That's healthy narcissism.

Narcissism exists on a spectrum and unhealthy narcissism occurs when there is a deficiency of narcissism, also known as Echoism, or when people become addicted to feeling special as in narcissistic personality disorder.

=== Michael Kinsey ===
In clinical psychologist Michael Kinsey's model, narcissism exists on a continuum as with other personality traits. The essence of healthy narcissism is the ability to invest love in oneself and other people. Thus it is devoid of the drive to exploit and cause harm to others as seen in narcissistic personality disorder, in which love is self-directed only.

He distinguishes trait narcissism as separate from pathological narcissism. He explains that subclinical narcissism does not manifest uniformly:

We’re not all narcissistic in the same way, or to the same degree, but we do all have narcissistic tendencies. Not only is self-absorption universal, it’s also a vital aspect of health.

Kinsey identifies the main attributes of healthy narcissism as:

1. Being able to admire others and accept admiration.
2. Believe in the importance of your contributions.
3. Feel gratitude and appreciation not guilt.
4. Empathize with others but prioritize self.
5. Embody self-efficacy, persistence and resilience.
6. Respect the self in health habits and boundaries.
7. Be confident in being seen.
8. Tolerate other's disapproval.
9. Create goals and pursue them with desire.
10. Be attentive to the external world.
11. Be aware of emotions.

== Impact of healthy v. destructive narcissistic managers ==
Lubit compared healthily narcissistic managers versus destructively narcissistic managers for their long-term impact on organizations.

In a separate but related distinction, American psychoanalyst and anthropologist Michael Maccoby makes the case for “productive narcissists.” Maccoby posits that productive narcissists are ideal leaders in moments of socio-economic upheaval. He credits them with an innate skill set he calls "strategic intelligence," which includes foresight, systems thinking, visioning, motivating, and partnering. Maccoby is clear that narcissistic leadership doesn’t necessarily lead to success, as narcissists who lack strategic intelligence ultimately fail.

Characteristic	Healthy Narcissism	Destructive Narcissism
Self-confidence	High outward self-confidence in line with reality	Grandiose
Desire for power, wealth and admiration	May enjoy power	Pursues power at all costs, lacks normal inhibitions in its pursuit
Relationships	Real concern for others and their ideas; does not exploit or devalue others	Concerns limited to expressing socially appropriate response when convenient; devalues and exploits others without remorse
Ability to follow a consistent path	Has values; follows through on plans	Lacks values; easily bored; often changes course
Foundation	Healthy childhood with support for self-esteem and appropriate limits on behaviour towards others	Traumatic childhood undercutting true sense of self-esteem and/or learning that they don't need to be considerate of others

== See also ==
- Culture of Narcissism
- Narcissistic rage
- Narcissism of small differences
- Narcissistic withdrawal
- Primary narcissism
- Vulnerable/Grandiose narcissism
