= Megalophobia =

Fear of massive objects

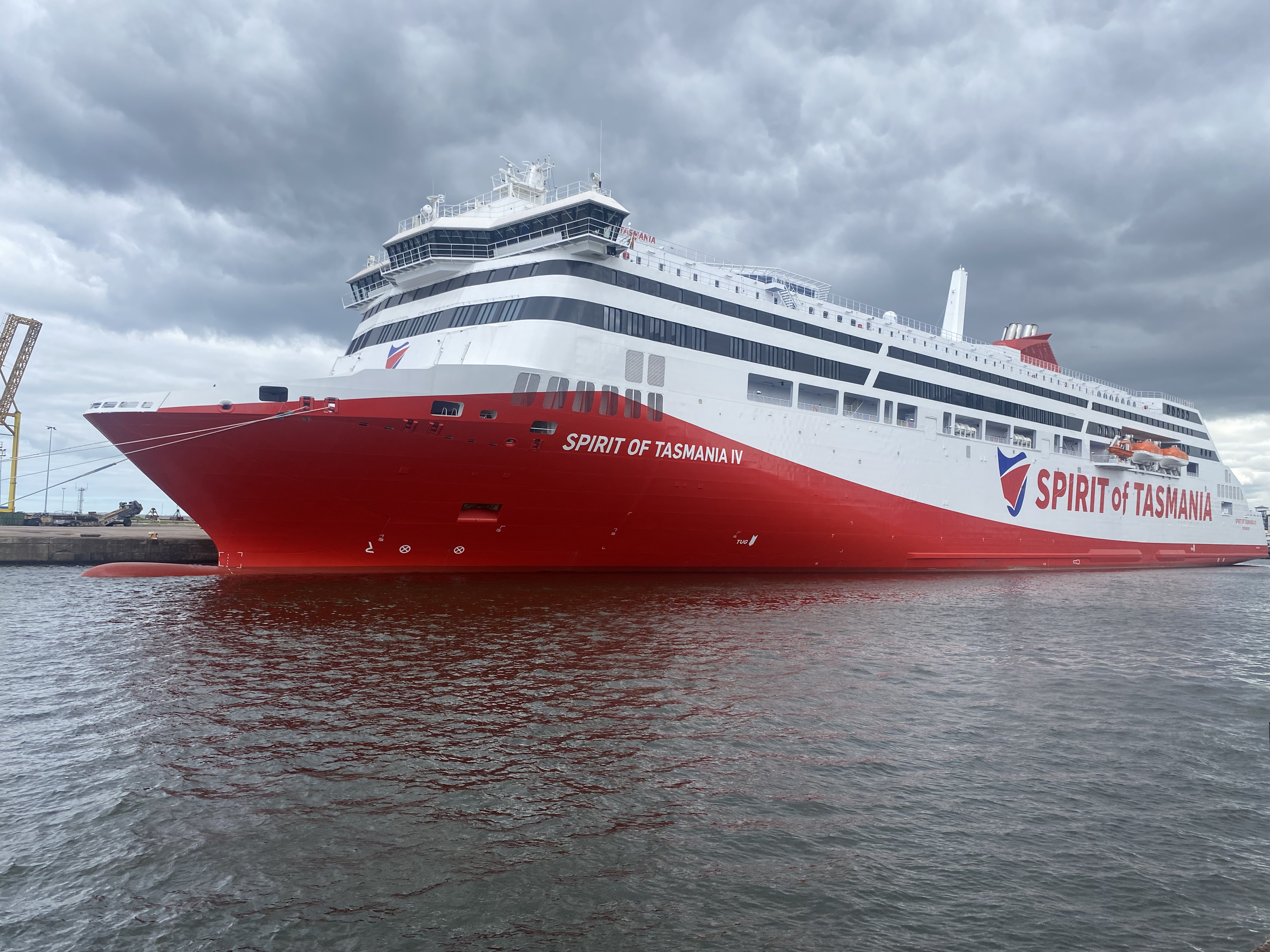
- Boats like the Spirit of Tasmania can trigger megalophobia due to how massive it is
- Specialty: Psychology

Megalophobia is the fear of large objects which triggers anxiety disorders and panic attacks. People with megalophobia will feel uneasy around huge objects. Some people with megalophobia will avoid going into cities due to the presence of skyscrapers and other massive structures and objects.

Megalophobia falls under the specific phobia category due to people with the fear will feel uneasy, shakiness around large objects and buildings.

Megalophobia is also a term to describe a feeling when looking at massive structures and objects.

== See also ==
- Gigantomania
- List of phobias
