= Béla Grunberger =

Béla Grunberger (22 February 1903 – 25 February 2005) was a Hungaro-French psychoanalyst and an authority on narcissism.

== May 68 ==
His 1969 work L'univers contestationnaire, written with fellow IPA member Janine Chasseguet-Smirgel under the joint pseudonym 'André Stéphane', postulated that the left-wing rioters of May 68 were totalitarian Stalinists, and proffered the hypothesis that they were "affected by a sordid infantilism caught up in an Oedipal revolt against the father".

Notably, Lacan mentioned this book with great disdain. While Grunberger and Chasseguet-Smirgel were still cloaked by the pseudonym, Lacan remarked that for sure none of the authors belonged to his school, as none of his disciples would stoop to such a low drivel. The authors in turn accused the Lacan School of "intellectual terrorism".
