= Narcissistic elation =

Term to describe narcissism

Narcissistic elation or narcissistic coenaesthetic (cenesthetic) expansion were terms used by Hungarian born psychoanalyst Béla Grunberger to highlight 'the narcissistic situation of the primal self in narcissistic union with the mother'.

Narcissistic elation has also been used more widely to describe a variety of conditions, including states of being in love, of triumph, and of obtaining self-understanding.

== Grunberger's definition ==
The term was coined to describe the state of prenatal beatitude, which according to him characterizes the life of the fetus: a state of megalomaniacal happiness amounting to a perfect homeostasis, devoid of needs or desires. The ideal here is bliss experienced in absolute withdrawal from the object and from the outside world.

Narcissistic elation is at once the memory of this unique and privileged state of elation; a sense of well-being of completeness and omnipotence linked to that memory, and pride in having experienced this state, pride in its (illusory) oneness. Narcissistic elation is characteristic of an object relationship that is played out, in its negative version, as a state of splendid isolation, and, in its positive version, as a desperate quest for fusion with the other, for a mirror-image relationship. It involves a return to paradise lost and all that is attached to this idea: fusion, self-love, megalomania, omnipotence, immortality, and invulnerability.

After birth, the infant continues to enjoy the protonarcissistic existence as before, and this is reinforced by the fact that people around it, in particular the mother, meet all its needs and wishes. This state of illusion is soon compromised, however, as inevitable frustrations begin to occur. The traces of this state of elation and megalomania, based on the notions of harmony and omnipotence, nevertheless provide a source of psychic energy that will remain active throughout life. The child, and later the adult, will seek to preserve and return to this narcissistic mode of being, notably through music, passionate love, or mystical ecstasy.

Perhaps, after all, what fascinated Narcissus was the sight—beyond his own reflection—of the amniotic water, and the deep, regressive promise of happiness that it held out. Following an initial period of elation known as the "honeymoon", psychoanalytic treatment must succeed in bringing together the narcissistic elements of the self by integrating them into interpretations of reality: ego-libido and object-libido must arrive at a satisfactory compromise.

== Oceanic origins ==
Freud had used the term oceanic feeling to describe 'an early phase of ego-feeling...the oceanic feeling, which might seek something like the restoration of limitless narcissism'. Freud stated, however, that he hadn't experienced this oceanic feeling (Civilization and Its Discontents).

Grunberger and André Green have subsequently 'traced narcissism to pre-natal states of elation, making it biological and drive-driven'. Building on 'the state of prenatal beatitude, which according to him characterizes the life of the fetus', Grunberger therefore considered that 'narcissistic elation is at once the memory of this unique and privileged state of elation; a sense of well-being of completeness and omnipotence linked to that memory, and pride in having experienced this state, pride in its (illusory) oneness'.

== Ego ideal ==
Freud also explored how 'in cases of mania the ego and ego ideal have fused together...in a mood of triumph and self-satisfaction'. Grunberger considered such states as reaching back to the primal narcissistic elation, and as drawing on 'traces of this state of elation and megalomania, based on the notions of harmony and omnipotence'.

Building on his work, Janine Chasseguet-Smirgel claims that 'it is indeed therefore narcissistic elation, the meeting of ego and ideal, that dissolves the superego'. One may consider in general that 'the feeling of triumph...brings with it "oceanic" feelings, because it represents reunion with the omnipotent one'.

== Toddling ==
With respect to a slightly later phase of early development, Margaret Mahler 'describes the practising junior toddler's omnipotent exhilaration (excitement) and narcissistic elation (joy)' at learning to walk—the 'tremendously exhilarating, truly dramatic effect that upright locomotion had'—noting however that 'it is precisely at the point where the child is at the peak of his delusion of omnipotence...that his narcissism is particularly vulnerable to deflation'.

In the wake of the toddler's new achievement, 'from dawn to dusk he marches around in an ecstatic, drunken dance...quite in love with himself for being so clever'.

== Self-understanding ==
Narcissistic elation may subsequently be reactivated within a therapeutic context. Edmund Bergler wrote of 'the narcissistic elation that comes from self-understanding'; while Herbert Rosenfeld described what he called the re-emergence of '"narcissistic omnipotent object relations"...in the clinical situation'.

Somewhat similarly, Lacan spoke of 'the megalomaniac ebriety which...[i]s the index of the termination of the analysis in present practice'.

== Love ==
In later life, the adult may seek to 'return to this narcissistic mode of being, notably through music, passionate love, or mystical ecstasy'. For some, the whole 'purpose of love...[is] equal exchange in an atmosphere of shared narcissistic elation'.

Others may consider as ultimately futile this 'search for a pure narcissistic exaltation, the elation procured by the imaginary contemplation of the object'; and yet still recognise the power of 'the enchantment of love...as the exaltation of the other...this breathlessness which, with the other, has created the most false of demands, that of narcissistic satisfaction'.

== Cultural examples ==
In A Portrait of the Artist as a Young Man, a 'cold intellectual arrogance and narcissistic elation' have been identified in 'the highly ambitious speculations attributed to Stephen—the central protagonist—with respect to aesthetics.

== See also ==
- Grandiosity
- Narcissistic rage and narcissistic injury
- Otto Kernberg
- Put on airs
- Self psychology
