= Richard Eldridge =

American philosopher

- Born: September 14, 1953 (age 73)

Education
- Education: University of Chicago (PhD), Middlebury College (AB)
- Thesis: In Pursuit of Self-Reconciliation and Community: Wittgenstein and the Role of Criticism in Philosophy (1981)
- Doctoral advisor: Ted Cohen, Alan Donagan, M. Thompson

Philosophical work
- Era: 21st-century philosophy
- Region: Western philosophy
- Institutions: Swarthmore College
- Main interests: philosophy of art

Richard Eldridge (born September 14, 1953) is an American philosopher and current Lecturer at the University of Tennessee. He was previously the Charles and Harriett Cox McDowell Professor Emeritus of Philosophy at Swarthmore College. He is known for his works on philosophy of art.

== Books ==
- Werner Herzog––Filmmaker and Philosopher, Bloomsbury, 2019
- Images of History: Kant, Benjamin, Freedom, and the Human Subject, Oxford University Press, 2016
- Stanley Cavell and Literary Studies: Consequences of Skepticism, Richard Eldridge and Bernard Rhie (eds.), Continuum, 2011
- The Oxford Handbook of Philosophy and Literature (ed.), Oxford University Press, 2009
- Literature, Life, and Modernity Columbia University Press, 2008
- An Introduction to the Philosophy of Art, Cambridge University Press, 2003
- Stanley Cavell (ed.), Cambridge University Press, 2003
- Persistence of Romanticism: Essays in The Philosophy and Literature, Cambridge University Press, 2001
- Leading a Human Life: Wittgenstein, Intentionality, and Romanticism, University of Chicago Press, 1997
- Beyond Representation: Philosophy and Poetic Imagination (ed.), Cambridge University Press, 1996
- On Moral Personhood: Philosophy, Literature, Criticism, and Self-Understanding, University of Chicago Press, 1989
