= Delusions of grandeur (disambiguation) =

Delusions of grandeur may refer to:

- Grandiose delusions
- Delusions of Grandeur (Fleming and John album)
- Delusions of Grandeur (novel)
- Delusions of Grandeur (Circle II Circle album), 2008
- Delusions of Grandeur (film), a 1971 French film
- Delusions of Grandeur (Sahg album), fourth studio album by the Norwegian band Sahg.
- Delusions of Grandeur (Gucci Mane album), fourteenth studio album by American rapper Gucci Mane.

== See also ==
- Grandeur (disambiguation)
