= Megalomania =

Megalomania or megalomaniac may refer to:

== Psychology ==
- Grandiose delusions, a type of delusion characterized by the belief that one is famous, all powerful, or wealthy
- Narcissistic personality disorder
- Omnipotence (psychoanalysis), a stage of child development

== Albums ==
- Megalomania (Aqua album), 2011
- Mania velichia or Megalomania, by Aria, 1985
- Megalomania (Enslavement of Beauty album), 2001
- Megalomania, by Kissin' Dynamite, 2014

== Songs ==
- "Megalomaniac" (Incubus song), 2004
- "Megalomaniac" (KMFDM song), 1997
- "Megalomania", by Swedish stoner rock band Truckfighters and the band Firestone, from Fuzzsplit of the Century, 2003
- "Megalomaniac", by indietronica band +/- from You Are Here, 2003
- "Megalomania", by Skyhooks from Guilty Until Proven Insane, 1978
- "Megalomania", by Black Sabbath from Sabotage, 1975
- "Megalomania", by English punk band the Blood from False Gestures for a Devious Public, 1983
- "Megalomania", by Therion from Of Darkness..., 1991
- "Megalomania", by English indie rock band Pele from Fireworks, 1992
- "Megalomania", the boss music from the video game Live A Live, 1994
- "Megalomania", by English rock band Muse from Origin of Symmetry, 2001

== Other ==
- Mega-Lo-Mania, a 1991 real-time strategy game by Sensible Software

== See also ==
- "Megalovania", a 2008 song by Toby Fox used in several video games
- Delusions of grandeur (disambiguation)
- Megalolamna, an extinct genus of shark
