= Volkshalle =

Formerly planned building for Berlin, Germany

Coordinates: 52°31′14″N 13°22′19″E

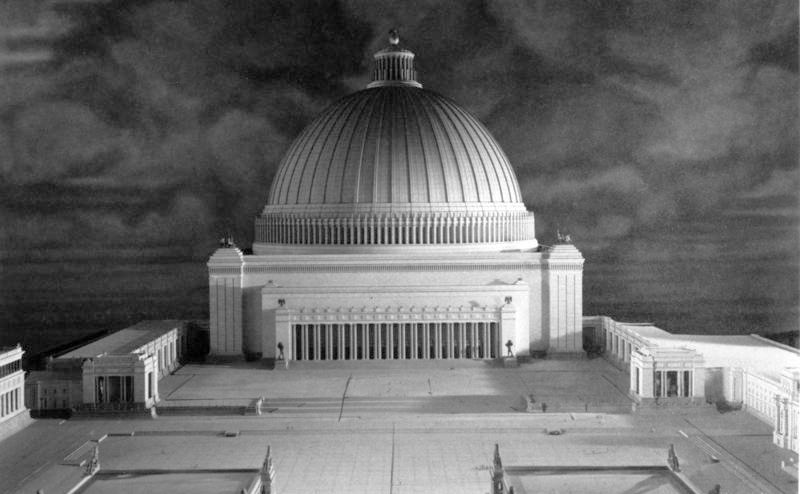
Model of the Große Halle

The Volkshalle (German pronunciation: [ˈfɔlksˌhalə], "People's Hall"), also called Große Halle ([ˌɡʁoːsə ˈhalə], "Great Hall") or Ruhmeshalle ([ˈʁuːməsˌhalə], "Hall of Glory"), was a proposal for a monumental, domed building to be built in a reconstituted Berlin (renamed as Germania) in Nazi Germany. The project was conceived by Adolf Hitler and designed by his architect Albert Speer. No part of the building was ever constructed.

The word Volk had a particular resonance in Nazi thinking. The term völkisch movement, which can be translated to English as "the people's movement" or "the folkish movement", derives from Volk but also implies a particularly racial undertone. Before the First World War, völkisch thought had developed an attitude to the arts as the German Volk; that is, from an organically linked Aryan or Nordic community (Volksgemeinschaft), racially unpolluted and with its roots in the German soil of the Heimat (homeland).

== Hitler and Hadrian's Pantheon ==
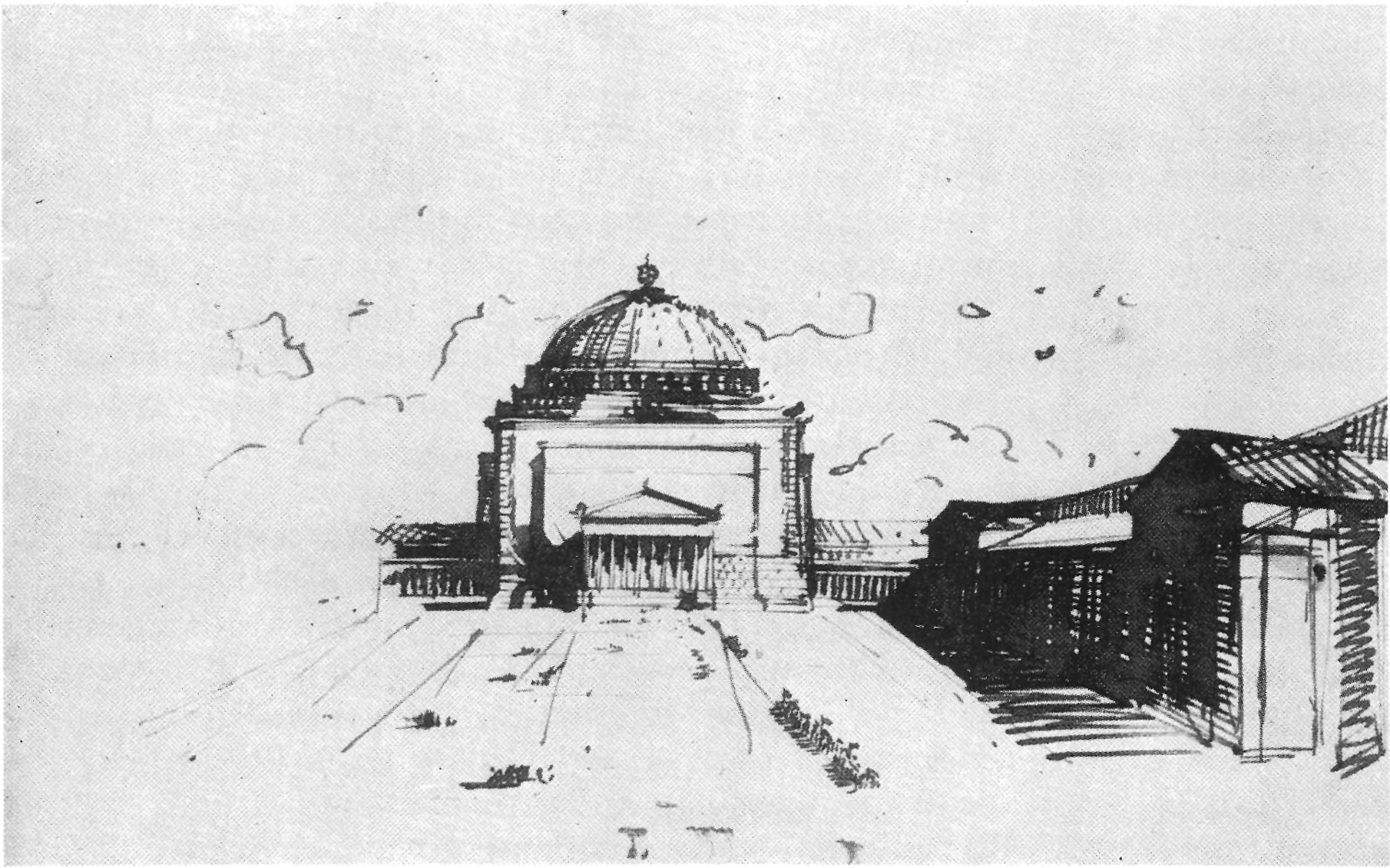
Drawing of the Große Halle by Hitler, 1925

Just as Augustus's Domus on the Palatine was connected to the Temple of Apollo Palatinus, Hitler's palace was to have been connected by a cryptoporticus to the Volkshalle, which filled the entire north side of the forum. This truly enormous building was, according to Speer, inspired by Hadrian's Pantheon, which Hitler visited privately on May 7, 1938. But Hitler's interest in and admiration for the Pantheon predated this visit, since his sketch of the Volkshalle dates from about 1925. Hermann Giesler records a conversation he had with Hitler in the winter of 1939–40, when Hitler was recalling his “Roman Impressions” (Römische Impressionen):

From. the time I experienced this building – no description, picture or photograph did it justice – I became interested in its history […] For a short while I stood in this space (the rotunda) – what majesty! I gazed at the large open oculus and saw the universe and sensed what had given this space the name Pantheon – God and the world are one.

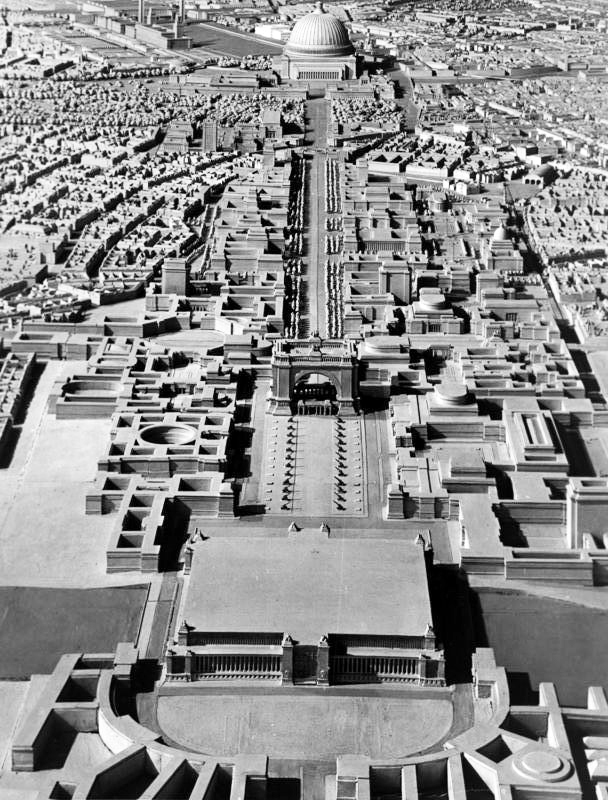
The Volkshalle's Great Dome can be seen at the top of this model of Hitler's plan for Berlin. For a location comparison, the Brandenburg Gate would have been located right on the street in front of the Volkshalle.

Hitler's impressions of the Roman Pantheon were revived when on June 24, 1940, he made a tour of selected buildings in Paris, with German architects Speer and Giesler and sculptor Arno Breker, including the Paris Panthéon, which seems to have disappointed him, independently recorded by Giesler and Breker.

The sketch of the Volkshalle given by Hitler to Speer shows a traditional gabled pronaos supported by ten columns, a shallow rectangular intermediate block and behind it the domed main building. Giesler notes that the pronaos of the temple in Hitler's sketch is reminiscent of Hadrian's Pantheon and of the style of Friedrich Gilly or Karl Friedrich Schinkel. However, there was little about Speer's elaboration of the sketch that might be termed Doric, except perhaps for the triglyphs in the entablature, supported by the geminated red granite columns with their Egyptian palm-leaf capitals, previously employed by Speer in the portico outside Hitler's study on the garden side of the new Chancellery.

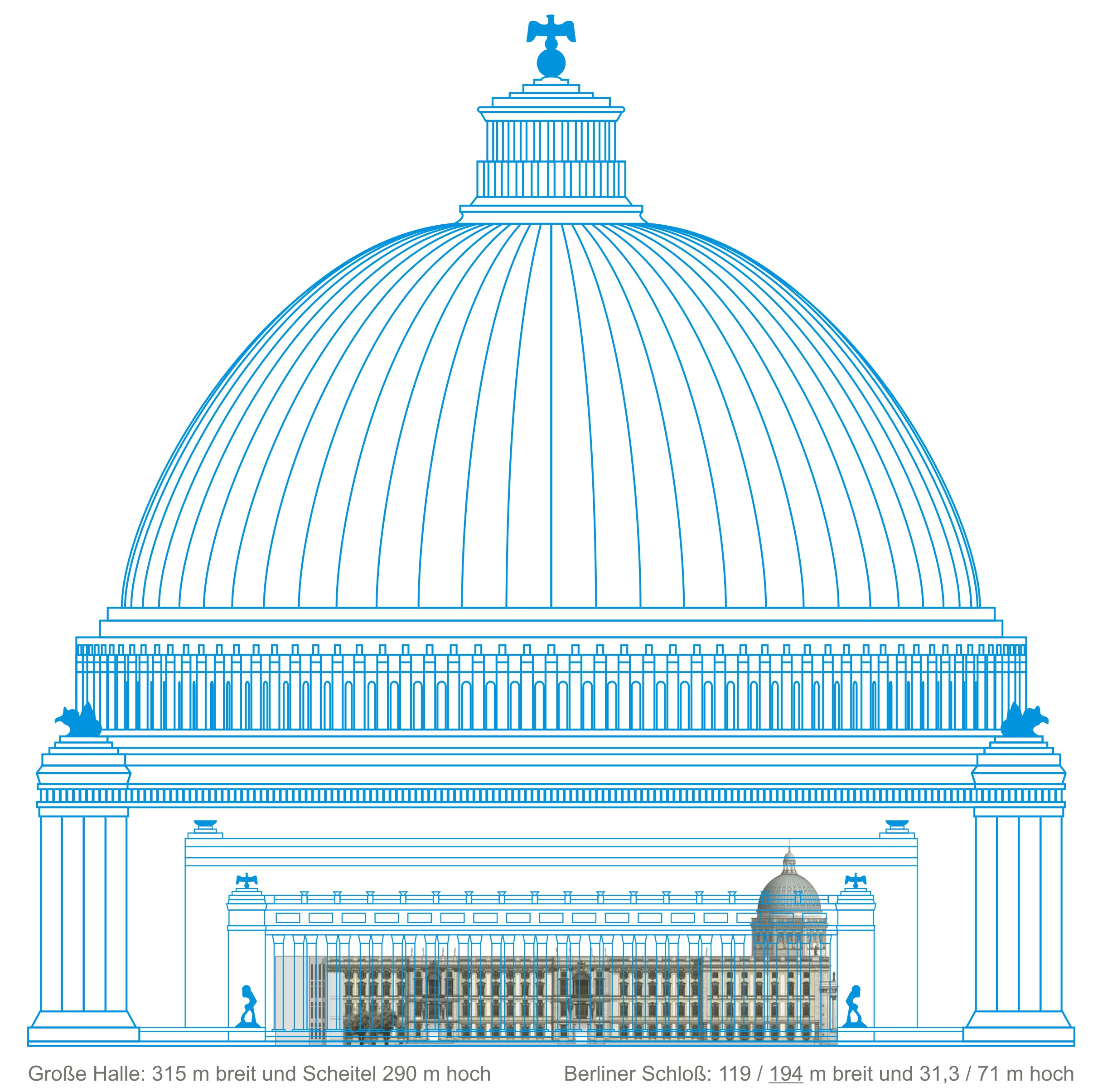
Size comparison: Volkshalle and Berlin Palace

Speer's Monster-Building (German: Monsterbau) was to be the capital's most important and impressive building in terms of its size and symbolism. Visually it was to have been the architectural centrepiece of Berlin as the world capital (Welthauptstadt). Its dimensions were so large that it would have dwarfed every other structure in Berlin, including those on the north-south axis itself. The oculus of the building's dome, 46 metres (151 ft) in diameter, would have accommodated the entire rotunda of Hadrian's Pantheon and the dome of St. Peter's Basilica. The dome of the Volkshalle was to rise from a massive granite podium 315 by 315 metres (1,033 ft × 1,033 ft) and 74 metres (243 ft) tall, to a total inclusive height of 290 metres (950 ft). The diameter of the dome, 250 metres (820 ft), was to be exceeded, much to Speer's annoyance, by the diameter of Giesler's new domed railway station at the east end of Munich's east–west axis. It was to be 15 metres (49 ft) greater in diameter than Speer's Volkshalle.

The resemblance of the Volkshalle to the Pantheon is far more obvious when their interiors are compared. The large niche 50 by 28 metres (164 ft × 92 ft) at the north end of the Volkshalle was to be surfaced with gold mosaic and to enclose an eagle 24 metres (79 ft) tall, beneath which was situated Hitler's tribunal. From here he would address 180,000 listeners, some standing in the central round arena, others seated in three concentric tiers of seats crowned by one hundred marble pillars, 24 metres (79 ft) tall, which rose to meet the base of the coffered ceiling suspended from steel girders sheathed on the exterior with copper.

The three concentric tiers of seats enclosing a circular arena 140 metres (460 ft) in diameter owe nothing to the Pantheon but resemble the seating arrangements in Ludwig Ruff's Congress Hall at Nuremberg, which was modeled on the Colosseum. Other features of the Volkshalle's interior are clearly indebted to Hadrian's Pantheon: the coffered dome, the pillared zone, which here is continuous, except where it flanks the huge niche on the north side. The second zone in the Pantheon, consisting of blind windows with intervening pilasters, is represented in Speer's building by a zone above the pillars consisting of uniform, oblong shallow recesses. The coffered dome rests on this zone. The design and size of the external decoration of this Volkshalle, are all exceptional and call for explanations that do not apply to community halls planned for Nazi fora in other German cities.

The temple-like nature of the domed building was noted by Speer, who surmised that the building was ultimately intended for public worship of Hitler, his successors and the German Reich, that is, it was to be a dynastic temple/palace complex of the kind Augustus built on the Palatine, where his modest house was connected to the temple of Apollo.

Hitler's aspirations to hegemony over Europe and the establishment of the New Order, already evident from architectural and decorative features of the new Chancellery, are even more clearly expressed here. External symbols suggest that the domed hall was where Hitler as cosmocrat (Herr der Welt) would appear before his Herrenvolk: On top of the dome's lantern was the German heraldic eagle clutching the globe of the Earth (Erdball). This symbolism was well known in imperial Roman iconography, for example, the restored statue of Claudius holding a ball and eagle in his right hand. The vast dome, on which it rested, as with Hadrian's Pantheon, symbolically represented the vault of the sky spanning Germany's empire. The globe on the dome's lantern was enhanced and emphasised by two monumental sculptures by Breker, each 15 metres tall, which flanked the north façade of the building: at its west end Atlas supporting the heavens, at its east end Tellus supporting the Earth. Both mythological figures were chosen by Hitler himself. Giesler says that Speer was wrong to represent the Volkshalle as a symbol of World Domination (Weltherrschaft). Speer in his 1971 Playboy magazine interview states:

Hitler believed that as centuries passed, his huge domed assembly hall would acquire great holy significance and become a hallowed shrine as important to National Socialism as St. Peters in Rome is to Roman Catholicism. Such cultism was at the root of the entire plan.

Nevertheless, Giesler remarked that Hitler never made plans for world domination and that to suggest as much is not only nonsense (Unsinn) but 'Speer Rubbish' (Speerlicher Quatsch).

== In fiction ==
Robert Harris's 1992 novel Fatherland takes place in an alternate history in which Nazi Germany won World War II and in which the Volkshalle was actually built. Several of the book's scenes take place in and around it. Harris carefully used Speer's plans, with the building being depicted as being 300 m (1,000 ft) tall. As depicted in the book, the building would indeed have had its own "weather", with the breathing and perspiration of 150,000 occupants precipitating in the high dome; but rather than considering this a problem, Nazi propaganda would boast of it. In a real-world corollary to the fiction concerning the Volkshalle, morning fog can roll into the Kennedy Space Center's immense Vehicle Assembly Building, leading to "clouds" being observed inside the building.

The Volkshalle appears in the alternate history novel In the Presence of Mine Enemies by Harry Turtledove, being used for the lying in state for the deceased Führer, Kurt Haldweim.

The Volkshalle's image appears in the video game Wolfenstein: The New Order, in an alternate 1960s in which (like the Fatherland novel) Nazi Germany won World War II.

Computer-generated imagery is used to depict the Volkshalle in an alternate history Berlin in the TV production of The Man in the High Castle. Multiple scenes in seasons two to four take place inside various parts of the Volkshalle. Unlike most other depictions of the Volkshalle, it was shown to have housed the Führer's Office and residence.

In the final scene of the video work Malka Germania by Yael Bartana, a computer generated model of the Volkshalle emerges from Lake Wannsee.

== See also ==
- Nazi architecture – Style promoted by the Nazis
- Palace of the Soviets – Unrealised Soviet project during Stalin's rule
- Reichstag building – Seat of the federal parliament of Germany
- Symbolism of domes
