= Stratification =

Stratification may refer to:

== Mathematics ==
- Stratification (mathematics), any consistent assignment of numbers to predicate symbols
- Data stratification in statistics

== Earth sciences ==
- Stable and unstable stratification
- Stratification, or stratum, the layering of rocks
- Stratification (archeology), the formation of layers (strata) in which objects are found
- Stratification (water), the formation of water layers based on temperature (and salinity, in oceans)
  - Ocean stratification
  - Lake stratification
- Atmospheric stratification, the dividing of the Earth's atmosphere into strata
- Inversion (meteorology)

== Social sciences ==
- Social stratification, the dividing of a society into levels based on power or socioeconomic status

== Biology ==
- Stratification (seeds), where seeds are treated to simulate winter conditions so that germination may occur
- Stratification (clinical trials), partitioning of subjects by a factors other than the intervention
- Stratification (vegetation), the vertical layering of vegetation e.g. within a forest
- Population stratification, the stratification of a genetic population based on allele frequencies

== Linguistics ==
- Stratification (linguistics), the idea that language is organized in hierarchically ordered strata (such as phonology, morphology, syntax, and semantics).

== See also ==
- Destratification (disambiguation)
- Fuel stratified injection
- Layer (disambiguation)
- Partition (disambiguation)
- Strata (disambiguation)
- Stratified epithelial lining (disambiguation)
- Stratified sampling
- Stratigraphy
- Stratum (disambiguation)
