= Coniophora gelatinosa =

Scientific classification
- Domain: Eukaryota
- Kingdom: Fungi
- Division: Basidiomycota
- Class: Agaricomycetes
- Order: Boletales
- Family: Coniophoraceae
- Genus: Coniophora
- Species: C. gelatinosa

Binomial name
- Coniophora gelatinosa Smith (1908)

Synonyms
- Aldridgea gelatinosa

Species of fungi

Coniophora gelatinosa is a species of fungus belonging to the Coniophora genus. It was first documented in 1892 by English mycologist George Edward Massee under the name Aldridgea gelatinosa, and belonged to the Aldridgea genus. In 1908 it was renamed to Coniophora gelatinosa by English mycologist Worthington George Smith.
