= Khen Shish =

Israeli painter and installation artist (born 1970)

- חן שיש
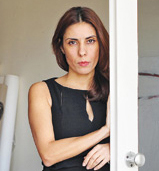
- Born: 1970 (age 55–56); Safed, Israel
- Website: www.khenshish.com

Khen Shish (Hebrew: חן שיש; born 1970) is an Israeli painter and installation artist.

== Biography ==
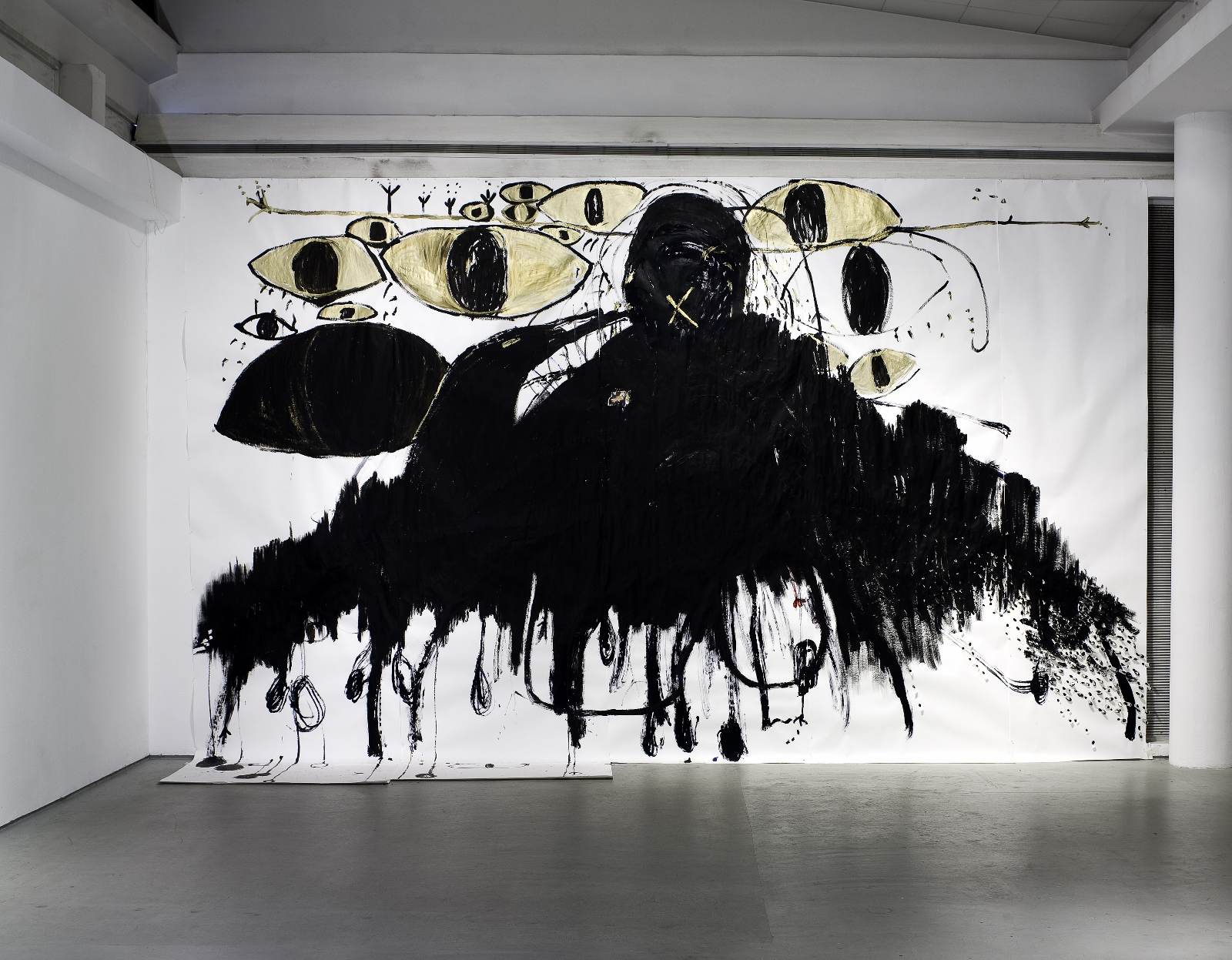
Raven and the Maiden, 2007, acrylic on paper, 550x700

Khen Shish was born in Safed to parents of Tunisian-Jewish origin. She studied art at the Art Institute, Oranim Academic College, Tivon, receiving a BFA in 1995. After graduation, she spent several years in Europe, living in Paris, London, Rome, and Berlin. In 1998, she returned to Israel, and completed an MFA at the Bezalel Academy of Arts and Design and the Hebrew University, Jerusalem (1997–1999). Shish is also a graduate of the New Seminar for Visual Culture, Criticism, and Theory, Camera Obscura School of Art, Tel Aviv (2000–2001).

== Art career ==
Shish works in a wide range of techniques. Her oeuvre includes paintings, drawings, collage, works executed on television screens, large-scale wall paintings, and installations. Her works introduce expressive sites oscillating between chaos and horror, nature and culture, refinement and excess, frugal and Baroque. Her works have been exhibited in leading museums and galleries in Israel and abroad. Shish currently resides in Tel Aviv with her daughter Tamar-Louise.

== Influences ==
Shish's work reveals diverse influences and sources of inspiration, including popular culture: cultural heroes such as Bruce Lee, Egyptian cinema stars, horror movies, handicrafts, round the world travel, outsider art, Arabian Nights, Zen chants, and ancient synagogues. Other influences originate in theoretical texts and prose: Julia Kristeva's Black Sun and Powers of Horror; Joseph Conrad's The Nigger of the "Narcissus", The Mirror of the Sea, and Heart of Darkness; Jorge Luis Borges's Seven Nights and The Craft of Verse.

== Motifs ==
"During the acquaintance phase with Shish's artistic world," curator Ruth Direktor wrote, "one ought to linger on the image most present in her works – present, metamorphosed, reemerging in the form of another image: The eye. Eyes. Countless eyes. The eye sometimes appears as a leaf; it may, all of a sudden, float on its own on a large pink canvas. At times it is torn from a self-portrait photograph or crossed out with aggressive masking-tape strips. It incarnates into the image of a light bulb. It can be identified in the hangman's noose, while at other times it is a flower. It is at once poetic and violent. The violence is directed primarily toward itself: a plucked, torn, absent, covered eye. At the same time, the empty gaze directed at the viewer from the works is startling and deterring. Inevitably, the viewer becomes a part of the reign of terror of what Bataille calls 'the gelded eye'."

== Khen | Djamila project ==
The Khen | Djamila project was installed as part of the exhibition "Mother Tongue" at the Museum of Art, Ein Harod (curator: Tal Ben Zvi) and at Wigmore Fine Arts, London. In the catalogue text, Ben Zvi wrote: "The project began in 1999 with a journey to London, where Shish moved into a primarily Arab immigrant neighborhood, presented herself as 'Djamila from Tunis,' and collected fragments of random encounters with second-generation Arab exiles. Some fell in love with her, gave her photographs, and wrote her letters. In 2002, she traveled to London once again, as well as to Paris, this time documenting the journey. She declared Djamila dead 'in the Twins' (9/11), but was forced to contend with her Arab persona when people spoke to her in Arabic. Shish assembled her identity—born of these journeys and the gaps between them—into an installation. Postcards, objects, papers, collages, and stickers tell the story of the deconstruction and reconstruction of an identity. Together, they form a powerful Mizrahi female 'Self.' Postcards of Arab movie stars bought at the Arab World Institute in Paris were cut up and reassembled. In one collage, Muhammad Abdel Wahab can be made out sitting on the legs of a Moroccan woman whose feet are decorated with Henna. Other works are based on papers photocopied at the Pompidou Center in Paris. Shish photocopied pages out of art books, and scribbled on them in Hebrew: 'Kusit from Tunis' and in English 'Tunisian' and 'Tunis.' The photocopied images have no accompanying text that might attest to their origins, nor do they bear any explanatory captions or artists' signatures. Thus, Shish appropriates art history in the service of her personal narrative."

== Painting, drawing, black ==
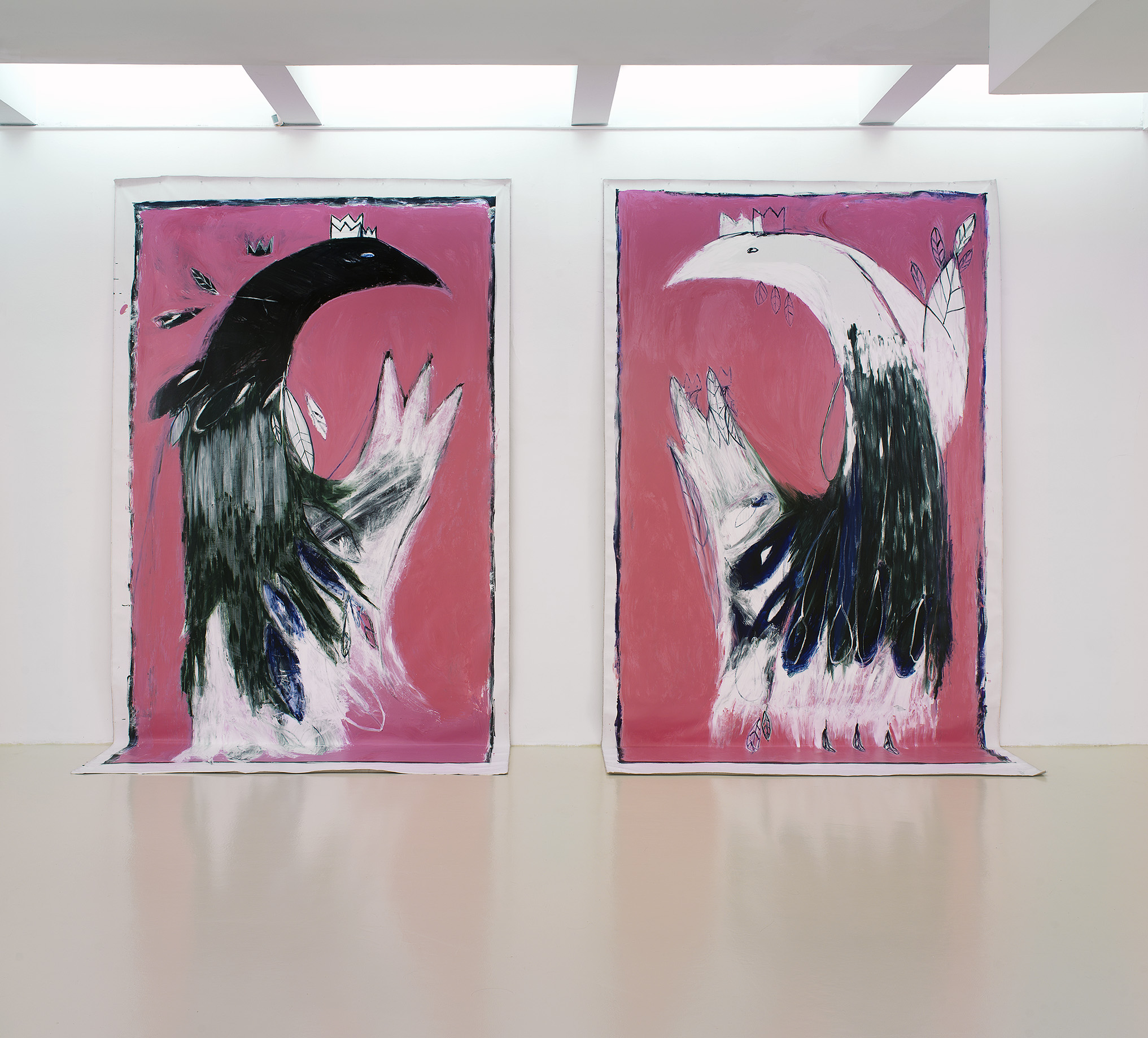
The Eagles, 2010, acrylic on canvas, 370x210 cm, collection of the Tel Aviv Museum of Art

Shish's oeuvre includes a series of large-scale paintings, over twenty meters wide, marked by their black color. These works have been described as monumental tributes to Expressionist art. Some of them overflow onto the museum floor, ostensibly attesting to their infinite quality, reflecting a daring practice, rare in the art world. The color black, which plays a major role here, offers a key through which to observe these works, be lured by them and even sucked in. In her catalogue essay for Shish's exhibition "In the Black Distance" (with Lea Nikel), curator Naomi Aviv wrote: "In Khen Shish’s work, black is a default choice, a given. Like using a pen for writing. Through the years, black has come to be identified with her painting, sometimes turning into dim pink underlying spontaneous images in black. Even when she recently started using deep, dark green, blue or purple, they have been seen as an extension of the black family – engendering also her wide use of gold, which often replaces the surface's white."

== Collage ==
Shish uses collage to construct an autobiographical archaeology. Her collages are made of cardboard, newsprint, stickers, stamps, double-sided adhesive tape, gold leaf, pictures of cultural heroes, photographs of volcanoes or erupting lava extracted from National Geographic, and mundane materials. One of them features an eye being plucked out, against the backdrop of photocopies of the artist's self-portrait. The black and white Xeroxed portraits are attached to television screens with masking tape, their pupils torn out. The television operates in its basic mode: a flickering blue screen devoid of any image. With the eyes torn out, the blue of the screen bursts forth through them. It is sky-blue, the glowing blue of Gothic stained glass windows, and at the same time, it is also the most synthetic, technological blue, the alienated and impersonal blue of staring. The silence of the television complements the eyes' castration and the hollow blinding of the blue screen.

== Nerves Sing ==
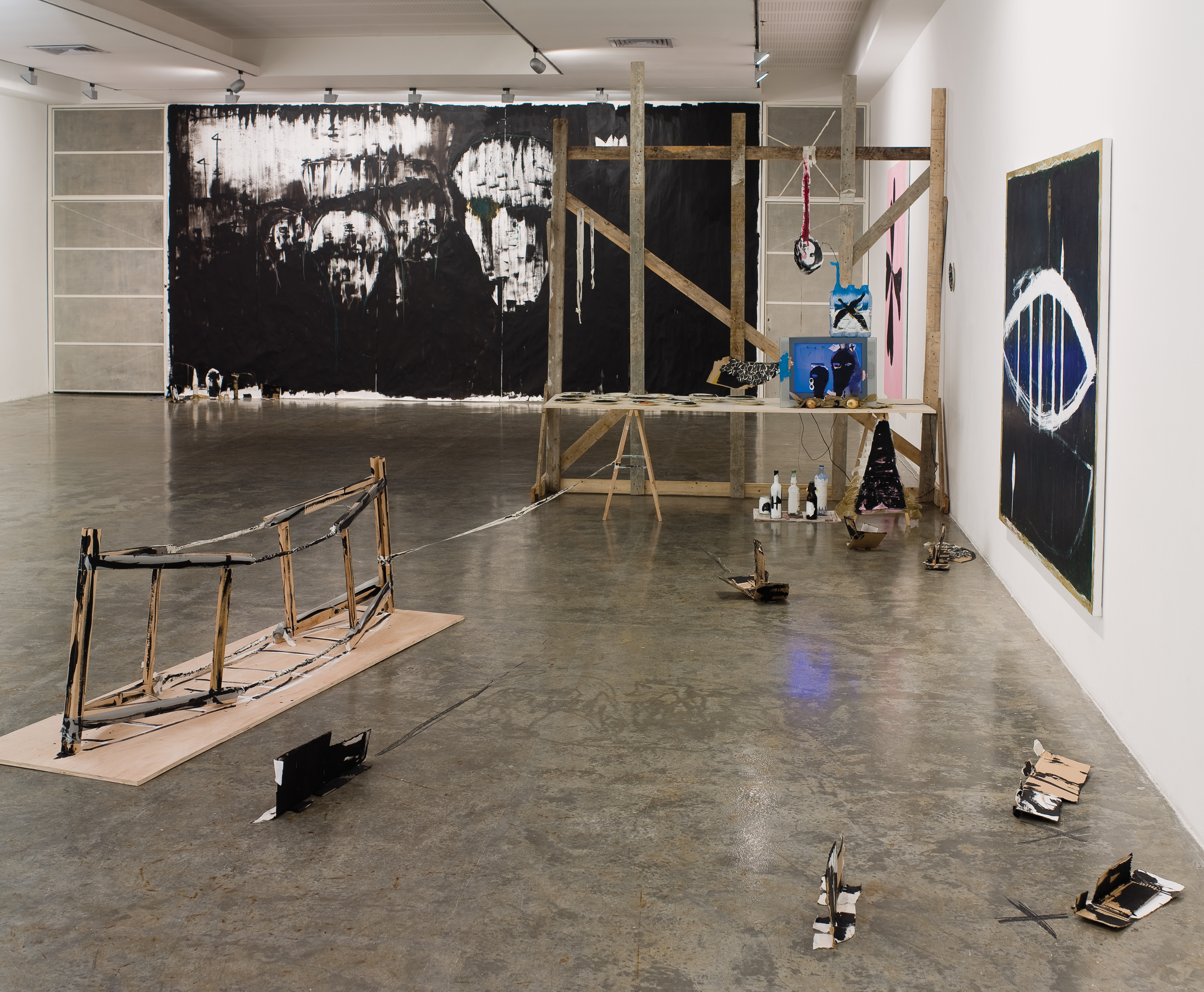
General view, "Nerves Sing", 2008, Alon Segev Gallery, Tel Aviv

Nerves Sing was an installation staged at Alon Segev Gallery, Tel Aviv in 2008. In the catalogue text, curator Ktzia Alon, Ph.D., wrote: "Khen Shish cuts the gallery space with large-scale paintings, a partition made of construction planks, and flattened cardboard boxes in an installation consisting of a work table and a 'boat' which is, in fact, an upside-down table. […] The painted portraits transform into a sculptural figure made of onions, newsprint, and empty bottles, in an architecture of teardrops and masking tape, […] Shish's familiar symbolism, a poetical dictionary of painting-drawing, constantly attempting to shield exposed nerves. […] With "piercing" aesthetics, Shish presents agitated performances of the 'Theater of Cruelty.' Her face is mutilated, her eyes are gouged out; her body becomes skeletal [...] the plates are painted black, the boats sink, nooses dangle about, and only wings are left of the angels. [...] The overt cover offered by the exhibition is but a part of a mutilated objecthood, introduced to be charged with a range of new meanings."

== A Tunisian Bride, a Sea of Tears, or: A Bride Aflame ==
Discussing Khen Shish's 2015 exhibition "Tunisian Bride" at Gordon Gallery, Tel Aviv, Tali Tamir wrote: "The Tunisian bride starring in Khen Shish's pink-black-gold paintings, representing the artist herself, is washed away by an ocean of tears, goes up in flame like a martyr, while growing to monumental dimensions, bedecked like a Byzantine queen, sporting scorpion pincers or peacock wings. Shish, however, shuns gracefulness: the figure of the bride has become a ritual hybrid comprised of human and beast, a bride and a bird of prey that (possibly) pecks at her groom's liver." The French word "Tunisien" is written at the heart of Shish's cycle of paintings. The use of French in this series highlights the language's affinities with violence and colonialism. According to scholar Ella Shohat in her book Taboo Memories, Diasporic Voices (Duke UP, 2006), while the writing of words in French indicates cultural blending, a type of syncretism, it cannot be separated from the past in which that language was forced by the French conqueror. The immigration experience of the artist's parents, who hailed from a former French colony (Tunisia), is a significant component of her identity as well as her artistic practice.

== See also ==
- Visual arts in Israel
- Women of Israel
