= List of people from Safed =

This is a list of notable people from Safed.

== Born in Safed ==
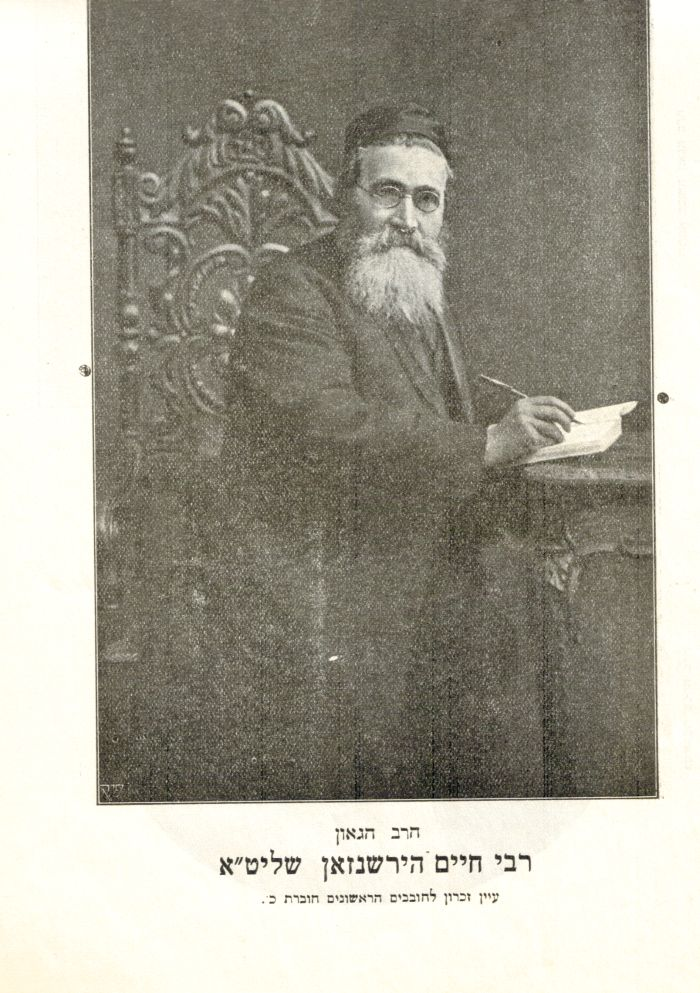
Rabbi Chaim Hirschensohn

- Mahmoud Abbas (born 1935), Palestinian president since 2005
- Jussuf Abbo (1890–1953), Jewish sculptor and printmaker who was successful in Germany in the 1920s
- Modi Alon (1921–1948), Israeli fighter pilot
- Moshe Amar (1922–2015), politician who served as a member of Knesset between 1977 and 1981
- Elazar ben Moshe Azikri (1533–1600), kabbalist and poet
- Yehoshua Bar-Yosef (1912–1992), writer
- Giovanni Giuda Giona Battista (1588–1668), rabbi who converted to Catholicism
- Fazil Bey (1789–1810), author of Zenanname (The Book of Women)
- Yehuda Cohen (1914–2009), Israeli Supreme Court justice
- Yaakov Shaul Elyashar (1817–1906), Sephardi Chief Rabbi
- Wadie Haddad (1927–1978), also known as Abu Hani, the Palestinian leader of the Popular Front for the Liberation of Palestine's armed wing
- Chaim Hirschensohn (1857–1935), rabbi
- Salma Jayyusi (1925–2023), Palestinian-Jordanian poet and translator
- Subhi al-Khadra (1895–1954), Palestinian Arab politician, lawyer, and newspaper columnist
- Baruch Maman (born 1955), Israeli footballer
- Meir Meivar (1918–2000), the Haganah commander of Safed during 1948 and mayor of Safed between 1965 and 1966
- Chava Mond (born 1984), Israeli model
- Israel ben Moses Najara (c. 1555–c. 1625), Jewish poet
- Shalom Moskovitz (c. 1887–1980), painter and artist
- Itay Ne'eman, UCLA mathematics professor and logician
- Abi Ofarim (1937–2018)), musician and dancer
- Esther Ofarim (born 1941), folk singer
- Yogev Ohayon (born 1987), basketball player
- Samir al-Rifai (1901–1965), politician who served six times as Jordanian prime minister
- Moshe Roas (born 1981), artist
- Nabil Shaath (born 1938), negotiator for the Palestinian National Authority and its first foreign minister
- Khalīl b. Aybak al-Ṣafadī (1296–1363), author and historian
- Al-Khalidi al-Safadi (died 1625), Ottoman historian and the Hanafi mufti of Safed
- Arad Sawat (born 1975), set and production designer
- The Shadow (born 1977), rapper
- Moshe Shamir (1921–2004), author
- Khen Shish (born 1970), painter and installation artist
- Ilan Shohat (born 1974), mayor of Safed from 2008 to 2018
- Hayyim ben Joseph Vital (1542–1620), Jewish rabbi and disciple of Isaac Luria

== Notable residents of Safed ==
- Shlomo Halevi Alkabetz (c. 1500–1576), rabbi, kabbalist and poet perhaps best known for his composition of the song "Lecha Dodi"
- Moshe Alshich (1508–1593), rabbi, preacher, and biblical commentator
- Jacob Alyashar (1730–c. 1790), Talmudist and emissary
- Jacob Berab (1474–1546), rabbi and talmudist best known for his attempt to reintroduce rabbinic ordination
- Moses ben Jacob Cordovero (1522–1570), leader of mystical school
- Shmuel Eliyahu (born 1956), Chief Rabbi of Safed
- Yitzhak Frenkel Frenel (1899–1981), father of Israeli modern art. Important Jewish artist of the Ecole de Paris, influenced and taught many notable artists. Amongst the founders of the Artists Colony/Quarter of Tzfat and amongst the first artists to settle in Safed.
- Mohamed Anwar Hadid (born 1948), American real estate developer and Olympic speed skier. Remains the only person to have represented Jordan in the Winter Olympics. Known for being the father of Gigi and Bella Hadid, American models and television personalities.
- Shimshon Holzman (1907–1986), artist
- Joseph Karo (1488–1575), rabbi and author of the great codification of Jewish law, the Shulchan Aruch
- Lior Lubin (1979–2024), basketball player and coach
- Isaac Luria (1534–1572), rabbi and Jewish mystic, considered the father of contemporary Kabbalah.
- Miriam Mehadipur (born 1960), Dutch-born artist, resident of Safed since 1999, owner of Mehadipur + Collection
- Moshe of Trani (1500–1580), rabbi of Safed from 1525 until 1535
- Possibly the Biblical Woman with seven sons whose tomb is often said to be an ancient tomb discovered in the old cemetery of the city
