= Strata (disambiguation) =

Strata is the plural of stratum (the geological formation); for uses in the singular, see Stratum (disambiguation).

Strata may also refer to:

== Media ==
=== Music ===
- Strata (band), a Northern California band
- Strata (Matthew Shipp album), 1998
- Strata (Robert Rich and Steve Roach album), 1990
- Strata (Strata album), 2004
- Strata Records, a record label
- Strata-East Records, a record label

=== Other media ===
- Strata (comics), a superhero in the DC Universe
- Strata (novel), a science fiction novel by Terry Pratchett
- Strata (film), a 1983 New Zealand film

== Software ==
- Kirix Strata, a web browser
- Strata (company), a software company
- Strata 3D, a 3D software
- Strata (video game), a 2013 puzzle game
- Strata, an IT certification from CompTIA

== Other uses ==
- Strata (food), a family of layered casseroles
- Strata (linguistics)
- Strata roller coaster, a height classification, of roller coaster
- Strata SE1, a building in London, England
- Strata title, a form of ownership devised for multi-level apartment blocks
- Strata Tower, building in Abu Dhabi
- Strata, a homogeneous subgroups of members in Stratified sampling population

== See also ==
- Stratum (disambiguation)
- Substrata (disambiguation)
