= Substrata =

Substrata, plural of substratum, may refer to:

- Earth's substrata, the geologic layering of the Earth
- Hypokeimenon, sometimes translated as substratum, a concept in metaphysics
- Substrata (album), a 1997 ambient music album by Biosphere
  - Substrata 2, a 2001 double album by Biosphere, including a remaster of the 1997 album
- Substrata (gardening), another term for subsoil
- Substrata (geology), layers of rock or sediment
- Substrata (linguistics), languages which influence another through linguistic contact

== See also ==
- Substratum in Vedic Sanskrit
- Stratum (disambiguation)
- Strata (disambiguation)
- Substrate (disambiguation)
