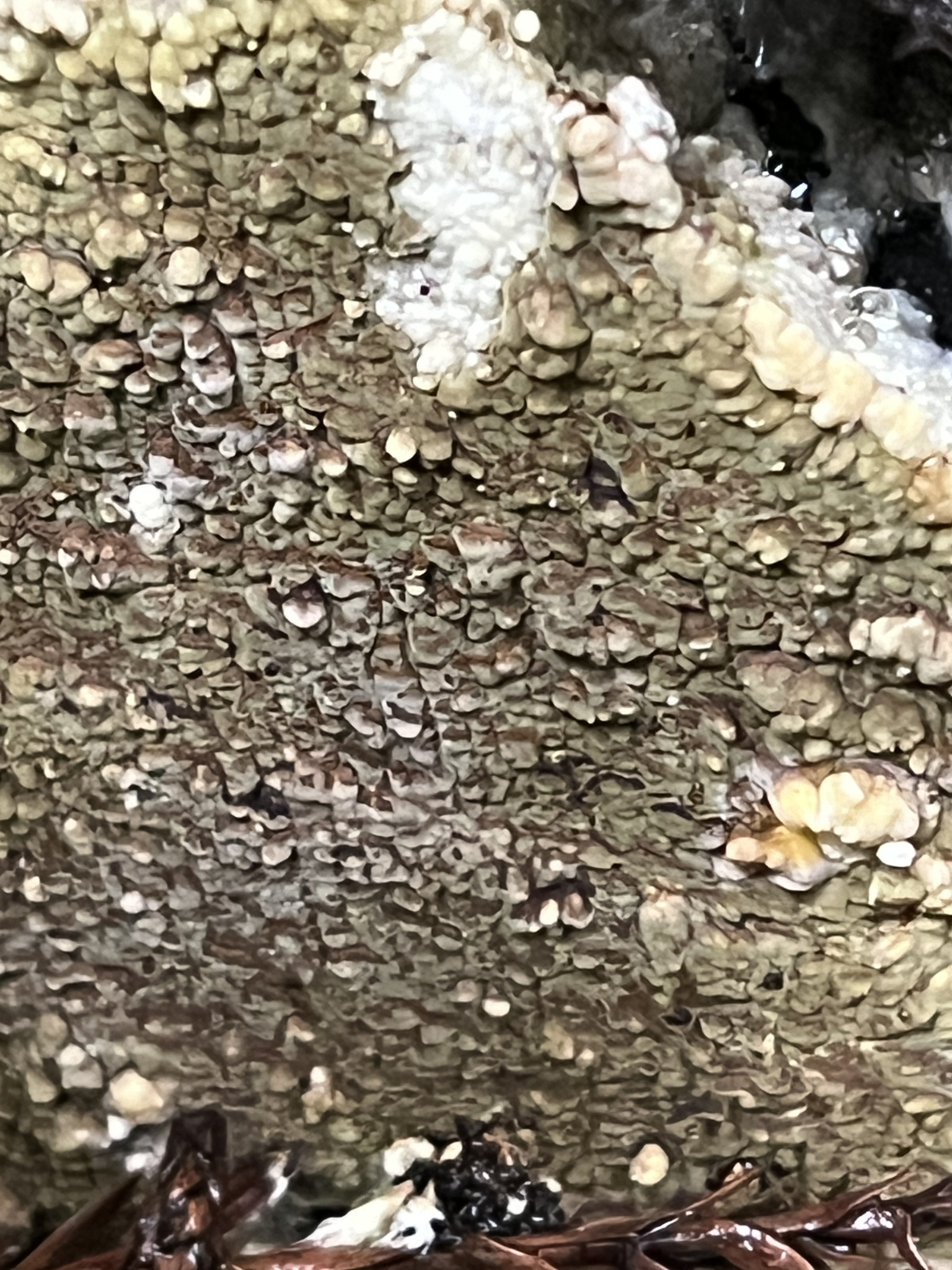

Scientific classification
- Kingdom: Fungi
- Division: Basidiomycota
- Class: Agaricomycetes
- Order: Boletales
- Family: Coniophoraceae
- Genus: Coniophora
- Species: C. olivacea

Binomial name
- Coniophora olivacea (Fr.) P. Karst.

= Coniophora olivacea =

Species of fungus

Coniophora olivacea, also known as olive duster, is a species of corticoid fungus in the family Coniophoraceae, first described by Elias Magnus Fries and given its current name by Petter Adolf Karsten.

== Distribution and habitat ==
It appears in all continents except Antarctic, most often in Europe. It usually grows on conipher wood (e.g. Picea abies, Pinus sylvestris), but sometimes also on hardwood.
