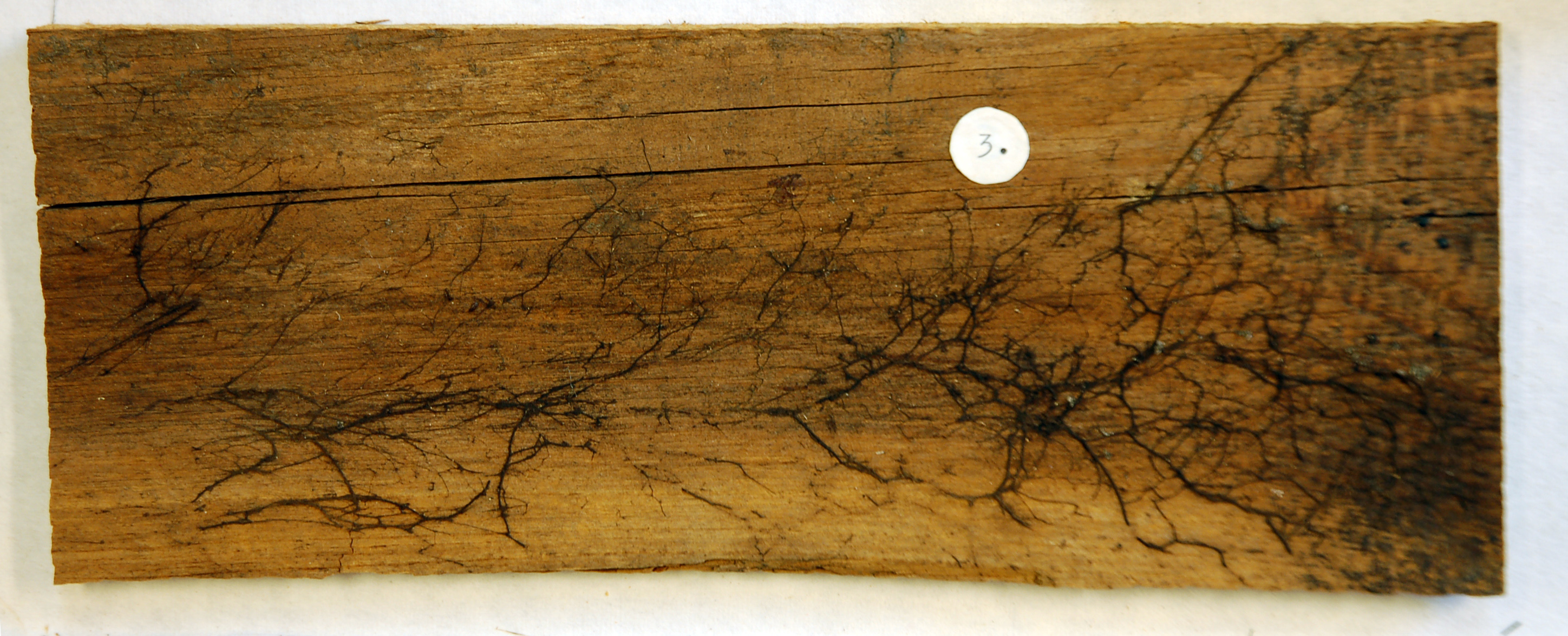

Scientific classification
- Kingdom: Fungi
- Division: Basidiomycota
- Class: Agaricomycetes
- Order: Boletales
- Family: Coniophoraceae
- Genus: Coniophora
- Species: C. puteana

Binomial name
- Coniophora puteana (Schumach.) P.Karst. (1865)

Synonyms
- Thelephora puteana Schumach. (1803)

= Coniophora puteana =

Species of fungus

Coniophora puteana (commonly known as a cellar fungus) is a wet rot (specifically brown rot fungus belonging to the division Basidiomycota. It has the appearance of large brown patches surrounded by white edges typically found in humid areas on pine as well as hardwood.

The mycelium of C. puteana is not always present and often leaves a very thin layer of healthy wood making the fungus very difficult to detect before the structure becomes instable. Contrary to most brown rot fungi C. puteana behaves more like a white-rot fungi in the way it decays, such as the thinning of the cell walls and leaving cavities within the substrate. Unlike other common wet rot fungi, C. puteana is a fungus that requires high humidity averaging around 50-60%. Because of this C. puteana can be found in wood near water leakage or naturally humid areas not limiting it to the common areas such as cellars.

Coniophora puteana has a very widespread distribution being found on most continents including North America, South America, Europe, India, Africa, Australia, and Asia. C. puteana is most predominantly found in eastern North America as well as western Europe. C. puteana is most commonly found during autumn in the month of October.

== Damage ==
Coniophora puteana unlike other brown-rot fungi can completely degrade the secondary cell wall of its substrate through the 2 types of hyphae that it possesses. While one type of hyphae can completely degrade the entire cell wall the other can only modify the lignin within. Given the vast ability to degrade the entire cell wall C. puteana can cause immense damage to the substrate leading to structural instability especially in old buildings that are made mostly out of wood. Given the difficulty of detecting C. puteana it can lead to severe instability before being noticed. The lack of visible mycelium can actually make C. puteana easier to identify if noticed before it widely spreads. The high humidity requirement for growth makes C. puteana grow predominantly near water leaks or areas with high humidity or high precipitation. Due to the unique requirements for growth C. puteana rarely grows in nature but rather under the circumstances of man made buildings making it an issue for many people around the globe.
