= Coniophora elegans =

Scientific classification
- Domain: Eukaryota
- Kingdom: Fungi
- Division: Basidiomycota
- Class: Agaricomycetes
- Order: Boletales
- Family: Coniophoraceae
- Genus: Coniophora
- Species: C. elegans

Binomial name
- Coniophora elegans Höhn., 1919

Synonyms
- Physospora elegans Morgan 1895

Species of fungus

Coniophora elegans is a species of fungus within the family Coniophoraceae.
