= Stratum (disambiguation) =

A stratum in geology is a layer of sedimentary rock or sediment. In archaeology, it is a layer of man-produced sediment of a certain age.

Stratum may also refer to:

== Science and technology ==
- Layer or stratum (archaeology): see Stratigraphy (archaeology)
- Stratum (linguistics), a language influencing or influenced through language contact
- Stratum (statistics), in stratified sampling, a homogeneous subgroup of members in the population
- Stratum, an element of a topologically stratified space
- Clock stratum, in a clock network, a hierarchical level reflecting the quality of a clock
- Stratum corneum, the outermost layer of the skin
- Stratum membranosum, the membranous layer

== Other uses ==
- Stratum, Netherlands, a city district of Eindhoven
- Stratum (album), a 2012 album by Drottnar
- Stratum (sculpture), a series of sculptures by Mikyoung Kim in Portland, Oregon, US

== See also ==
- Strata (disambiguation)
- Stratification (disambiguation)
- Stratus (disambiguation)
- Substrate (disambiguation)
- Superstrate
