= Anamorph (disambiguation) =

Anamorph and its derivates may refer to:

== Biology ==
- Anamorph, a part of the life cycle of fungi in the phyla Ascomycota and Basidiomycota
- Anamorphosis (biology), a type of metamorphosis in which an arthropod adds body segments while retaining general form and habits

== Art and film ==
=== Technologies ===
- Anamorphosis or anamorphic image, where the viewer must use special devices or be in a specific place to see an undistorted image
- Anamorphic format, in cinematography, stretching a widescreen picture to fit on 35 mm film
- Anamorphic widescreen, in DVD manufacture, horizontally squeezing a widescreen image so it can be stored in a DVD image frame

=== Titled works ===
- Anamorph (film), a 2007 film by Henry S. Miller
- Anamorphosis (EP), by the Norwegian band Drottnar

== Other uses ==
- Anamorphism, a concept in computer science

== See also ==
- Animorphs, a book series by K. A. Applegate
  - Animorphs (TV series), a 1999 television series based on the books
  - Animorphs (video game), a 2000 video game based on the series
