= Substrate =

Substrate may refer to:

== Physical layers ==
- Substrate (biology), the natural environment in which an organism lives, or the surface or medium on which an organism grows or is attached
  - Substrate (vivarium), the material used in the bottom of a vivarium or terrarium
  - Substrate (aquarium), the material used in the bottom of an aquarium
- Substrate (building), natural stone, masonry surface, ceramic and porcelain tiles
- Substrate (chemistry), the reactant which is consumed during a catalytic or enzymatic reaction
- Substrate (materials science), the material on which a process is conducted
- Substrate (printing), the base material that images will be printed onto
- Printed circuit board (PCB), or more specifically, the electrically insulating portion of a PCB structure, such as fiberglass bound together with epoxy cement
- Substrate (geology), a stratum on which another geologic stratum lies
- Wafer (electronics), sometimes called a substrate for deposition or growth processes

== Other uses ==
- Substratum (linguistics), in linguistics, a language that influences but is supplanted by a second language
- Neural substrate, in neuroscience, the set of brain structures that underlies a specific behavior or psychological state
- Substrate (blockchain framework) is a framework for developing blockchains on the Polkadot network

== See also ==
- Substrata (disambiguation)
- Monism, for the concept of the universal substrate in philosophy
- Reagent
- Reactant
- Subjectile
- Superstrate
