= Aldridgea ignatiana =

Scientific classification
- Kingdom: Fungi
- Division: Basidiomycota
- Class: Agaricomycetes
- Genus: Aldridgea
- Species: A. ignatiana

Binomial name
- Aldridgea ignatiana Rick (1959)

Species of fungus

Aldridgea ignatiana is the lone species of fungi belonging to the Aldridgea genus. It was documented in 1959 by Brazilian mycologist Johannes (João Evangelista) Rick.
