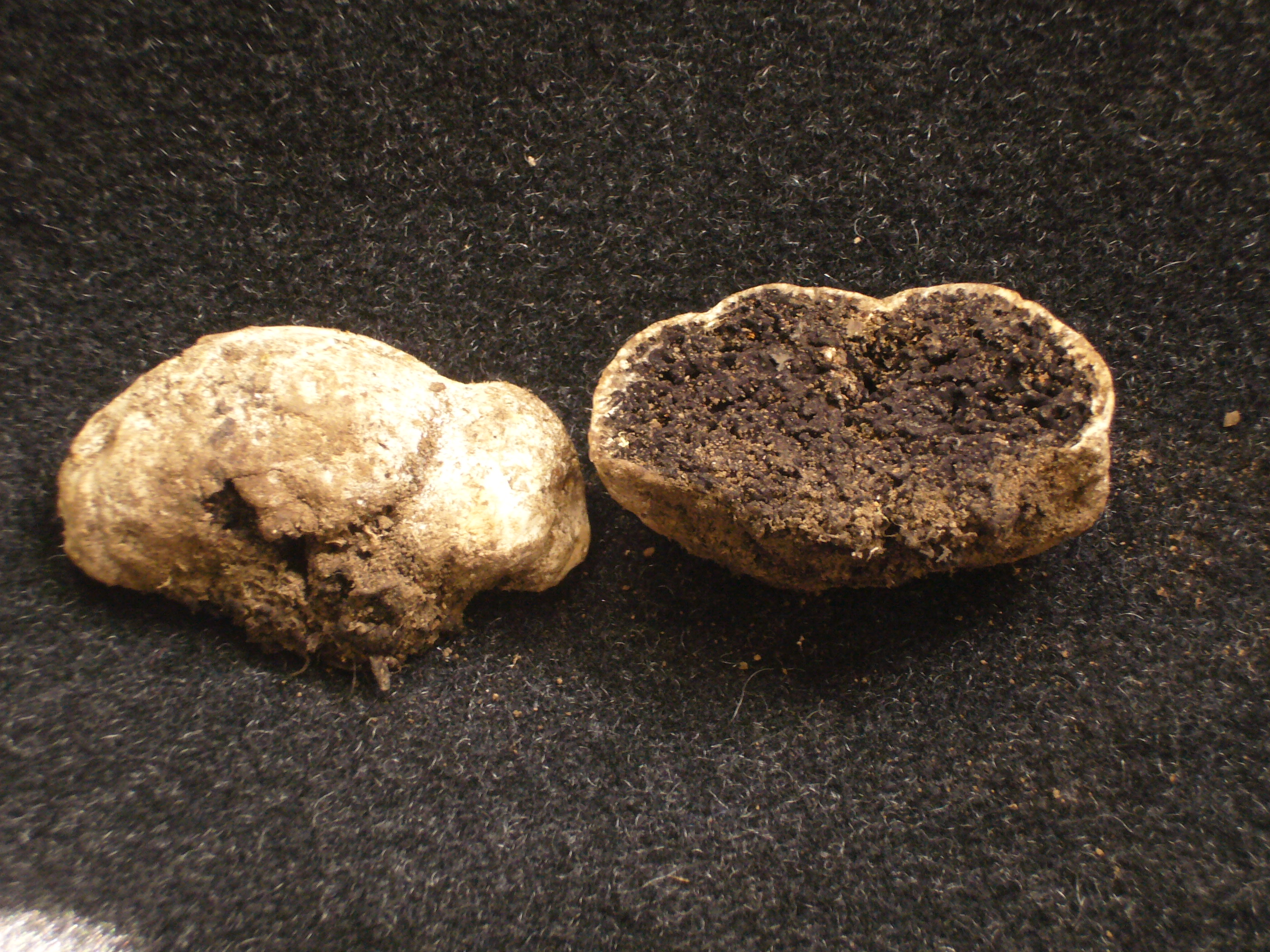

Conservation status
- Vulnerable (NatureServe)

Scientific classification
- Kingdom: Fungi
- Division: Basidiomycota
- Class: Agaricomycetes
- Order: Boletales
- Family: Coniophoraceae
- Genus: Sedecula; Zeller
- Species: S. pulvinata

Binomial name
- Sedecula pulvinata Zeller

= Sedecula =

Genus of fungi

Sedecula is a genus of fungi in the order Boletales. The genus is monotypic, containing the single species Sedecula pulvinata, found in the United States, and first described by American mycologist Sanford Myron Zeller in 1941. In 2024 it was announced that the mushroom had been found in the Czech Republic in the area of South Moravia in 2011.
