= Coniophoropsis =

Scientific classification
- Kingdom: Fungi
- Division: Basidiomycota
- Class: Agaricomycetes
- Order: Boletales
- Family: Coniophoraceae
- Genus: Coniophoropsis; Hjortstam & Ryvarden (1986)

Type species
- Coniophoropsis obscura Hjortstam & Ryvarden (1986)

Genus of fungi

Coniophoropsis is a fungal genus in the family Coniophoraceae. It is a monotypic genus, containing the single species Coniophoropsis obscura, found in Argentina. Both the genus and the species were described in 1986 by mycologists Kurt Hjorstam and Leif Ryvarden.
