= Capacity to be alone =

Acquired ability

Capacity to be alone is a developmentally acquired ability, considered by object relations theory to be a key to creative living.

Julia Kristeva sees it as central to an authentic inner life, as well as to creative sublimations in life and art.

== Conceptual development ==
D. W. Winnicott in his article of that name (1958/64) highlighted the importance of the capacity to be alone, distinguishing it from both withdrawal and loneliness, and seeing it as derived from an internalisation of the non-intrusive background presence of a mothering figure. Winnicott in his writings always stressed the importance of the baby being allowed "just to lie back and float", and of the "opportunity that the baby has to experience separation without separation". Out of those early experiences emerges the capacity to be alone in (or out of) the presence of others - something which might have to be re-acquired later in life through psychotherapy.

A later strand of analysis, drawing on the work on listening of Theodore Reik, has emphasised the importance of the analyst's capacity to be alone in the analytic situation - to remain centred in themselves in the face of the projections and resistances of the patient.

== Creative adaptations ==
André Green saw the fertile interaction of reading/writing as rooted in the capacity to be alone.

== See also ==
- Asociality
- Existentialism
- Good enough parent
- Negative capability
- Pascal
- Samuel Beckett
- Transitional object
