= Stratum (album) =

Studio album by Drottnar
- Released: October 13, 2012
- Recorded: 2009–2012, Norway
- Genre: Christian metal, extreme metal
- Length: 38:26
- Label: Endtime
- Producer: Drottnar

Drottnar chronology
Welterwerk (2006)	Stratum (2012)

Singles from Stratum
- 1. "Lucid Stratum" Released: November 8, 2011

Stratum is the second full-length studio album by the Norwegian Christian extreme metal band Drottnar, initially released on October 13, 2012 through Endtime Productions. A single was released for the album, "Lucid Stratum", on November 8, 2011, and the band went on a four-stop tour with Deuteronomium and Pantokrator in Finland from May 2–5, 2013. The album features a highly technical and complex form of extreme metal, and met with a positive reception from critics.

== Background and recording ==
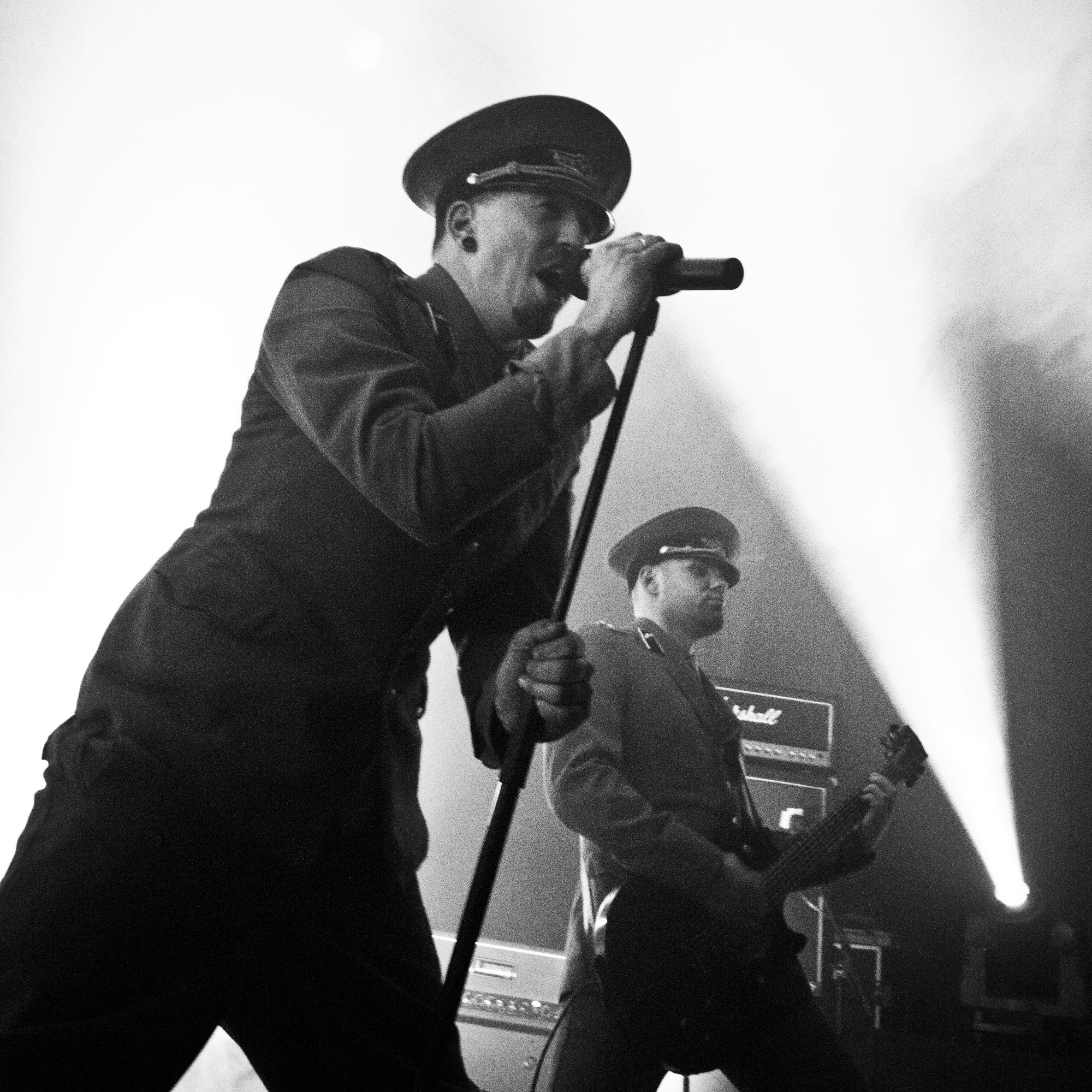
Sven-Erik Lind performing at Elements of Rock in Uster, Switzerland, 2013, wearing early-20th century military regalia

Drottnar formed in Fredrikstad, Norway, in 1996. The band recorded and released two demos, Doom of the Antichrist and A White Realm, both of which were re-mastered and re-released as a compilation, Spiritual Warfare, in 2000. The compilation was described as death/doom and Viking metal. In 2003, the group released an EP, Anamorphosis, and adopted a more minimalist black metal style. A studio album, Welterwerk, followed in 2006, and featured a technical and chaotic sound. Around the time of Welterwerk's release, the band members started wearing early 20th century military regalia in mockery of Nazi and Communist regimes.

Recording for Stratum began in 2009, which the band announced on Facebook on February 1 of that year. The next day, Drottnar announced the departure of guitarist Bengt Olsson. However, later that year, on August 12, the band announced that Olsson had rejoined Drottnar. Recording continued for the next few years. The album was mastered at Strype Audio by Tom Kvålsvoll.

== Promotion and release ==
A single from the album, "Lucid Stratum", was released on November 8, 2011. On October 13, 2012, the band released Stratum in digital format, as well as a music video for the song "We March". Drottnar held a release party on March 16, 2013 at Elements of Rock in Uster, Switzerland, and announced on March 19 that a few physical copies of Stratum were available before they hit stores. On February 14, 2014, Drottnar released a lyric video for "Cul-De-Sac".

== Musical style ==
Reviewers described the music on Stratum as a highly complex and technical form of extreme metal. HM's Michael Larson noted that on Stratum, Drottnar continued with the technical playing of the past, and perhaps even became more technical, but balanced this with a "subdued grind and some atonal chord work". André Gabriel of Metal.de described the music as "extreme", melding black metal with a "weird", progressive style, and noted the many tempo changes and intricate song structures. Radio show MLWZ wrote that on the album, Drottnar brings together "elements of technical, black, death, industrial, avant-garde and just about every form of extreme metal one can think of".

== Touring ==
On December 1, 2012, Drottnar performed at Metal Night at Fabriken in Alingsås, Sweden. On May 2–5, 2013, Drottnar went on the 20 Years of Holy Metal tour in Finland with Deuteronomium and Pantokrator. The tour made four stops: Tampere, Kuopio, Lahti, and Helsinki.

== Critical reception ==
Professional ratings
Review scores
Source	Rating
HM	4/5 stars
Metal.de	6/10

Stratum met with a positive reception from critics. Michael Larson of HM rated the album four out of five stars, remarking that "Drottnar sure takes their sweet time putting out albums, with 6 or 7 years between full-length releases. This time, it was definitely worth the wait." Larson opined that he liked the band's first release, 2000's Spiritual Battle, but disliked the band's previous album, 2006's Welterwerk, as was "too chaotic". However, in Larson's opinion, "Stratum seems to have taken the best of both those releases and melded them together into a furious sonic fury." He felt that while the band kept its technical playing style, it avoided getting too "chaotic and noisy". He also praised the production quality of the release, dubbing it "stellar". André Gabriel of Metal.de rated the album six out of ten, calling the album intelligently designed and well-played, but not outstanding. Kev Rowland, writing for the Polish radio show MLWZ, stated that he was "incredibly impressed" by the album. He lavished praise on the album's production, describing the sound quality as "incredible, large, loud and incredibly clear and concise so that one can hear just how much the bass is adding in terms of nuance". He concluded that Stratum

is frightening; it is compelling, schizophrenic and all encompassing. This is not music for everyone, as its very nature will push many away, but if you want your music to be extreme yet always maintain a sensibility and power then look no further. The very first time I played this I was incredibly impressed, and repeated plays have only cemented that opinion. This could well be the extreme metal album of the year...

== Track listing ==
No.	Title	Length
1.	"We March"	3:24
2.	"Slave"	5:07
3.	"Cul-De-Sac"	3:21
4.	"Soul Suburbia"	7:14
5.	"Seven Suns Shining"	3:21
6.	"Lucid Stratum"	4:23
7.	"Ersatz"	5:53
8.	"Wolves and Lambs"	5:41

== Release history ==
Region	Date	Label	Format
Worldwide	October 13, 2012	Endtime Productions	Digital download
Worldwide	March 19, 2013	Endtime Productions	CD, vinyl
