= Strata Presents The End of the World =

Studio album by Strata
- Released: July 17, 2007
- Recorded: 2007
- Genres: Post-hardcore, progressive rock, alternative rock, experimental rock, post-punk
- Label: Wind-up
- Producer: Gregg Wattenberg

Strata chronology
Strata (2004)	Strata Presents The End of the World (2007)

Singles from Strata Presents The End of the World
- 1. "Cocaine" Released: March 27, 2007; 2. "Stay Young" Released: October 2, 2007

Professional ratings
Review scores
Source	Rating
AbsolutePunk.net	(78%)
Allmusic	3.5/5 stars
Headline Planet	B−
Rawkfist Music	9.5/10 stars

Strata Presents The End of the World is Strata's second full-length album and was released on July 17, 2007.

== Track listing ==
No.	Title	Length
1.	"Night Falls (The Weight of It)"	3:21
2.	"Hot/Cold (Darling, Don't)"	4:12
3.	"The Dotted Line..."	3:32
4.	"Cocaine (We're All Going to Hell)"	3:47
5.	"Coma Therapy"	3:29
6.	"Poughkeepsie, NY"	3:49
7.	"Stay Young"	4:12
8.	"The Brothers"	1:05
9.	"Love Is Life"	4:53
10.	"The New National Anthem"	4:53
11.	"Natoma Alley"	0:54
12.	"Daylight in the City"	4:10
