= Khôra =

Concept in continental philosophy

In semiotics, khôra (also chora; Ancient Greek: χώρα) is the space that gives a place for being. The term has been used in philosophy by Plato to designate a receptacle (as a "third kind" [triton genos]; Timaeus 48e4), a space, a material substratum, or an interval. In Plato's account, khôra is described as a formless interval, alike to a non-being, in between which the "Forms" were received from the intelligible realm (where they were originally held) and were "copied", shaping into the transitory forms of the sensible realm; it "gives space" and has maternal overtones (a womb, matrix):

“Moreover, a third kind is that of the Khôra (χώρας), everlasting, not admitting destruction, granting an abode to all things having generation, itself to be apprehended with nonsensation, by a sort of bastard reckoning, hardly trustworthy; and looking toward which we dream and affirm that it is necessary that all that is be somewhere in some place and occupy some khôra; and that that which is neither on earth nor anywhere in the heaven is nothing."

— Plato, Timaeus, 52a–b

"So likewise it is right that the substance which is to be fitted to receive frequently over its whole extent the copies of all things intelligible and eternal should itself, of its own nature, be void of all the forms. Wherefore, let us not speak of her that is the Mother and Receptacle of this generated world, which is perceptible by sight and all the senses, by the name of earth or air or fire or water, or any aggregates or constituents thereof: rather, if we describe her as a Kind invisible and unshaped, all-receptive, and in some most perplexing and most baffling partaking of the intelligible, we shall describe her truly."

— Plato, Timaeus, 51a

== Etymology ==
In Ancient Greek: χώρα, romanized: khṓrā is the space where something is, or any generic place.

== History ==
Aristotle merged his teacher's concept with his definitions of prima materia (hylé), place (topos) and substratum (hypokeimenon), in the book 4 of Physics: "This is why Plato says in the Timaeus that matter and the khôra are the same; for the receptive and the khôra are one and the same. Although the manner in which he speaks about the receptive in the Timaeus differs from that in the so-called unwritten teachings, nevertheless he declares that place and the khôra are the same".

Key authors addressing khôra include Martin Heidegger, who refers to a "clearing" in which being happens or takes place. Kitaro Nishida stated that he based his concept of basho, Place, on the abyssal nothing mu inspired by his reading of Plato's notion of khôra.

Jacques Derrida has written a short text with the title Khôra. Jacques Derrida uses khôra to name a radical otherness that "gives place" for being, characterizing khôra as a formless interval, alike to a non-being, in between which the "Forms" were received from the intelligible realm (where they were originally held) and were "copied", shaping into the transitory forms of the sensible realm; it "gives space" and has maternal overtones (a womb, matrix):. For Derrida, khôra defies attempts at naming or either/or logic, which he "deconstructs". The project proposed the construction of a garden in the Parc de la Villette in Paris, which included a sieve, or harp-like structure that Derrida envisaged as a physical metaphor for the receptacle-like properties of the khôra. Derrida argues that the subjectile is the space between the sensible and the intelligible, through which everything passes, but in which nothing remains. For example, an image needs to be held by something, just as a mirror will hold a reflection.

Following Derrida, John Caputo describes khôra as:

neither present nor absent, active or passive, the good nor evil, living nor nonliving - but rather atheological and nonhuman - khôra is not even a receptacle. Khôra has no meaning or essence, no identity to fall back upon. She/it receives all without becoming anything, which is why she/it can become the subject of neither a philosopheme nor mytheme. In short, the khôra is tout autre [fully other], very.

If, as one contributor concludes, "khôra" means "space", it is an interesting space that "at times appears to be neither this nor that, at times both this and that," wavering "between the logic of exclusion and that of participation." (Derrida, The Name, 89).

Julia Kristeva deploys the "khora" as part of her analysis of the difference between the semiotic and symbolic realms, as the emancipatory employment of semiotic activity as a way of evading the allegedly phallocentric character of symbolic activity (signification through language), which, following Jacques Lacan, is regarded as an inherently limiting and oppressive form of praxis. Kristeva articulates the khôra in terms of a presignifying state: "Although the khôra can be designated and regulated, it can never be definitively posited: as a result, one can situate the khôra and, if necessary, lend it a topology, but one can never give it axiomatic form."
