= Destratification =

Destratification may refer to:

- Thermal destratification, mixing air to reduce stratified layers of heat that become trapped near the ceiling in buildings
- Lake stratification, mixing water to eliminate stratified layers of temperature, plant, or animal life
