= Drottnar =

Norwegian extreme metal band

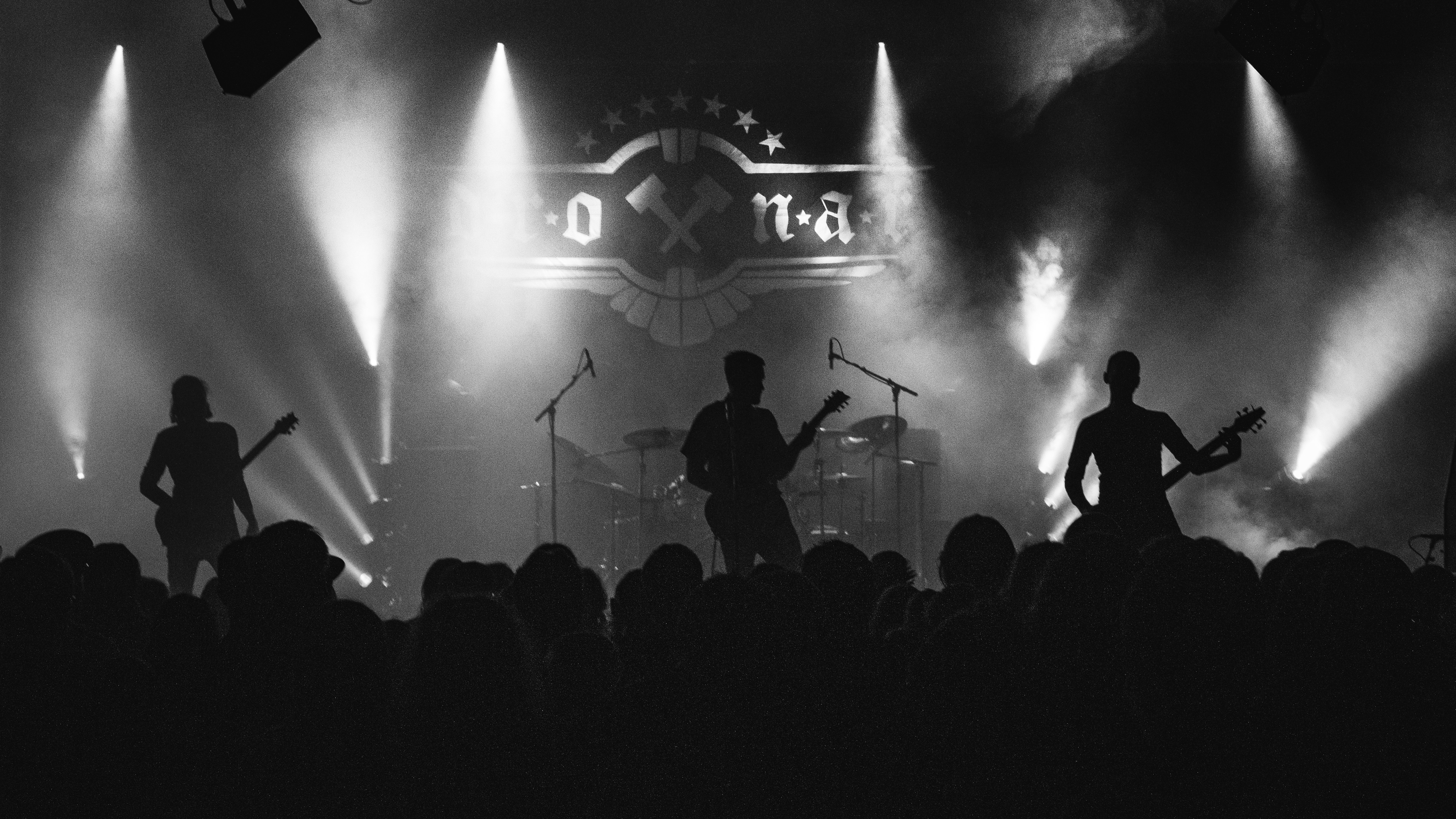
- Drottnar live at Elements of Rock 2013 in Switzerland.

Background information
- Also known as: Vitality
- Origin: Fredrikstad, Norway
- Genres: Folk metal, black metal, death-doom, avant-garde death metal, viking metal, mathcore
- Years active: 1996–present
- Labels: Endtime (2006–present); Momentum Scandinavia (2003); Plankton (2000)
- Members: Karl Fredrik Lind; Håvar Wormdahl; Glenn-David Lind
- Past members: Bengt Olsson; Sven-Erik Lind; Bjarne Peder Lind
- Website: drottnar.com

Drottnar is an extreme metal band from Fredrikstad, Norway. Formed in 1996, the band has released four albums, Spiritual Battle (2000), Welterwerk (2006), Stratum (2012) and Monolith (2019), and the EP Anamorphosis (2003). The first album was released on UK label Plankton Records. They are signed to Endtime Productions (Extol, Antestor, Crimson Moonlight).

Drottnar is the plural (sing. Drottinn, Norwegian "Drott") of the Icelandic word for master, ruler, or king. Originally adopting a Viking image, the band is known for their thematics and live shows, where they wear Soviet-style military uniforms.

== History ==
The four Lind siblings, vocalist Sven-Erik Lind, guitarist-keyboardist Karl Fredrik Lind, drummer Glenn-David Lind, and bassist Bjarne Peder Lind formed the band as Vitality in 1996. They recorded their first two demos at X-Ray Studios. The first one, Doom of Antichrist, was released in May 1996.

In 1998, they renamed to Drottnar and recorded the demo A White Realm in September.

In 2000, the band released their demos together as Spiritual Battle. It was published by UK based label Plankton Records. The demos were remastered for the album. Spiritual Battle was well received by Cross Rhythms Magazine.

A year later, Drottnar entered the studio of Black Woods Productions and recorded the song "Trellebaand Maa Briste" for Swedish label Endtime Productions' compilation album In the Shadow of Death.

The band changed its image and used elements, such as gas masks, in their live shows. In 2003, Drottnar recorded the EP Anamorphosis on Momentum Scandinavia. The EP was limited to 850 copies, and contains an intro and three songs with violins on the intro and other parts. Bass player Bjarne Peder Lind left the band before the album was recorded. Guitarist Bengt Olsson and bassist Håvar Wormdahl joined Drottnar.

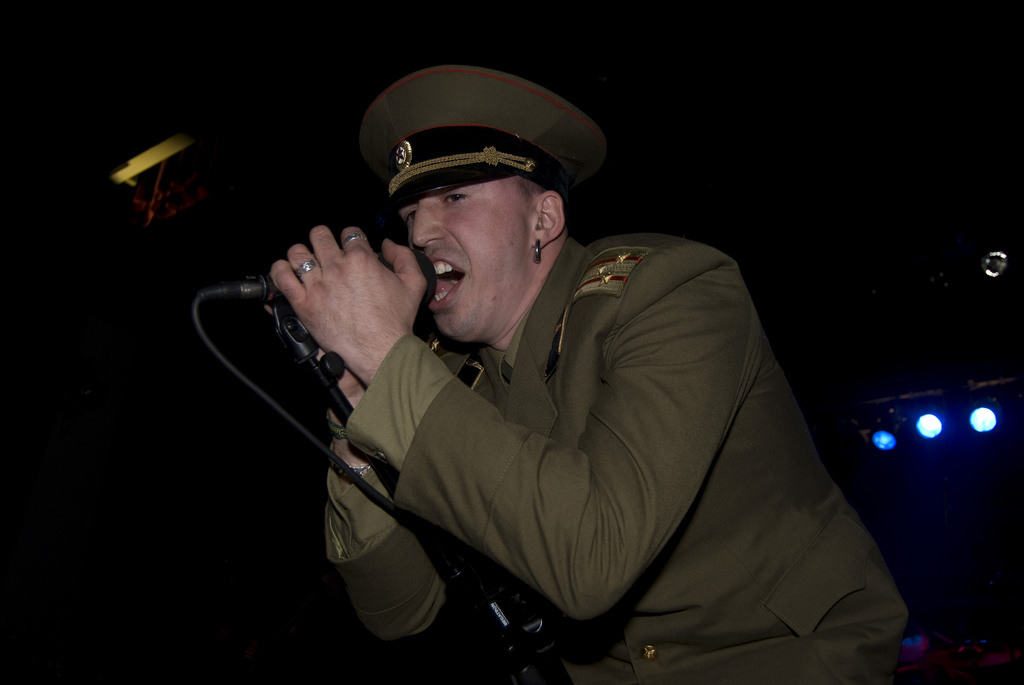
Vocalist Sven-Erik Lind wearing a military uniform.

In 2005, the band signed to Endtime Productions and entered Subsonic Studios to record new material. Some elements, such as a trumpet, were recorded in Ostrava, Czech Republic by Jan-Espen S. Schildmann. In April 2006, the band released Welterwerk. The promotional 7-inch vinyl single Ad Hoc Revolt was released. Around the album's release, the band began wearing early-20th century military regalia.

Drottnar has performed with bands such as Grimfist and Extol. The band played a short tour in the U.S. in summer 2008, performing at the Cornerstone Festival.

On 1 February 2009, the band announced that it was recording an album. The next day, Drottnar announced the departure of guitarist Bengt Olsson. Later that year, on 12 August, the band announced that Olsson had rejoined Drottnar. Recording continued for the next few years. The single "Lucid Stratum" was released on 8 November 2011. On 13 October 2012, the band released Stratum in digital format, as well as a video for the song "We March". In 2017, the band released the EP Monolith I, followed by Monolith II and Monolith III, in 2018. All three met praise from fans, showcasing an experimental sound.

=== Festival performances ===
Drottnar has played at notable festivals such as Sweden's Endtime Fest, Norway's Nordic Fest, Netherlands' Brainstorm Fest, Switzerland's Elements of Rock, and Finland's Immortal Metal Fest.

== Lyrics and themes ==
In the beginning the band's lyrics dealt with Christianity with a brutal and extreme approach; the lyrics on the album Spiritual Battle were inspired by the Book of Revelation and dealt mostly with the battle ravaging the spiritual world. The band members have said "The Norwegian black metal scene does not influence our lyrics, but the lyrics are still written in a black metal way, fitting our music well."

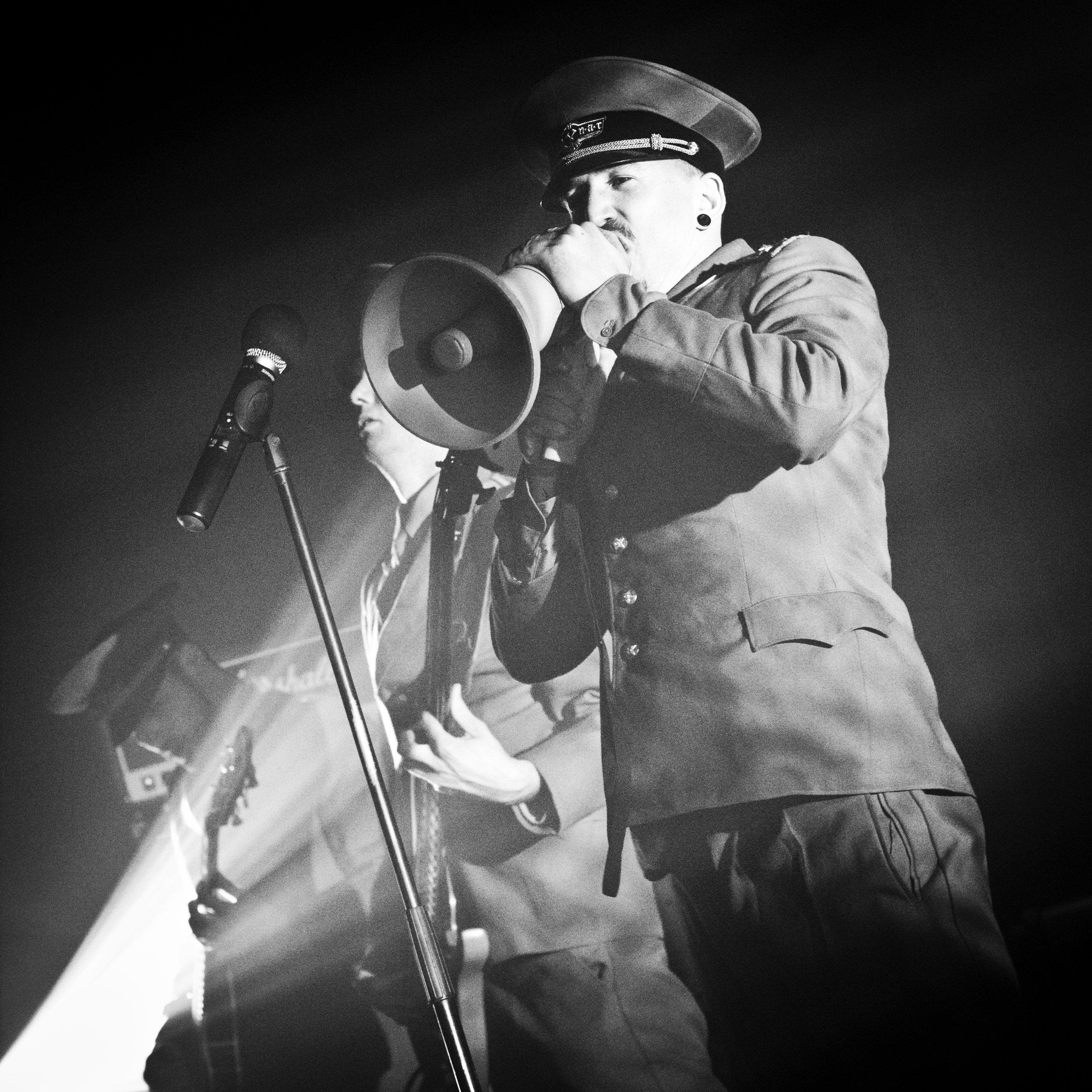
Megaphones are a recognizable element of Drottnar's live shows.

Currently Drottnar has had a special feature for several years, the use of Czech or "Soviet" style elements: the song titles and lyrics contain Soviet-sounding words and metaphors, some songs contain samples of radio play or radio communication elements involved in the 20th century, and at concerts all band members used Soviet uniforms,. The vocalist Sven-Erik Lind typically uses effects such as megaphones to create a military atmosphere.

=== Musical style ===
Drottnar's general style has been described as black metal, death/doom, and Folk metal. On Spiritual Battle, the band was compared to Groms, Extol, and Antestor, and Sven-Erik used a vocal style ranging from growling to a more high-pitched style. With the release of Welterwerk, Drottnar broadened their style, "aiming somewhere between Atheist, Extol, and the most complex Mayhem material and almost hitting the mark."

== Discography ==
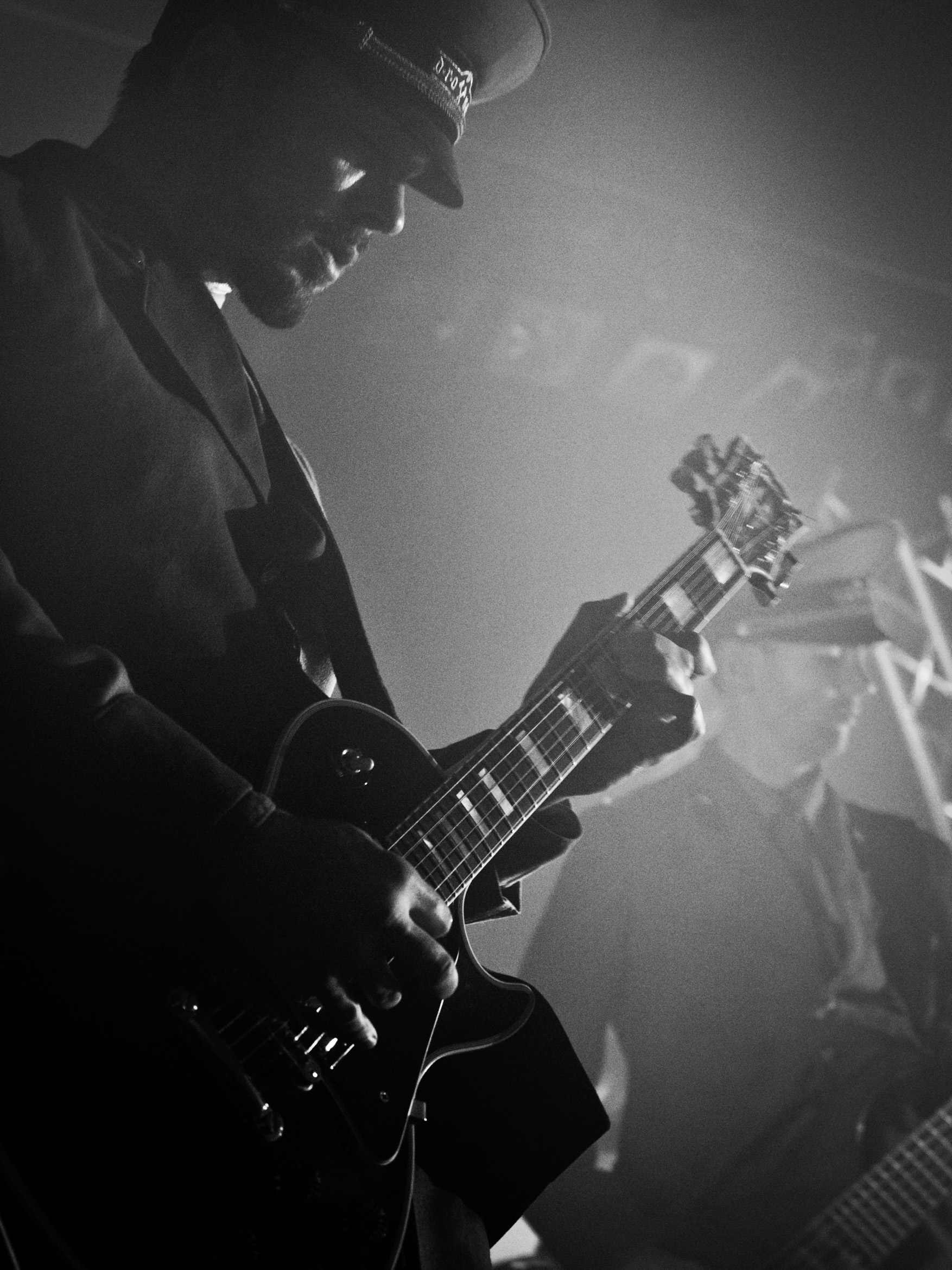
Drottnar live in 2013.

Albums

- Welterwerk (2006, Endtime Productions)
- Stratum (2012, Endtime Productions)
- Monolith (2019, Endtime Productions)

Singles

- "Lucid Stratum" Single (2011, Endtime Productions)
- "Wolves and Lambs' Single (2016, Endtime Productions)

Extended Plays

- Anamorphosis EP (2003, Momentum Scandinavia)
- Ad Hoc Revolt 7-inch EP (2006, Endtime Productions)
- Monolith I EP (2017, Endtime Productions)
- Monolith II EP (2018, Endtime Productions)
- Monolith III EP (2018, Endtime Productions)

Demo

- Doom of Antichrist (Demo, 1997) as Vitality
- Demo 96/97 (Demo, 1997) as Vitality
- A White Realm (Demo, 1998)

Compilation

- Spiritual Battle (Compilation, 2000,

Plankton Records)

== Members ==
Current lineup

- Karl Fredrik Lind – guitar (1996–present), Vocals (2013-present)
- Håvar Wormdahl – bass guitar (2003–present)
- Glenn-David Lind – drums (1996–present)

Former members

- Sven-Erik Lind – vocals (1996-2013)
- Bengt Olsson – guitar (1996-2013)
- Bjarne Peder Lind – bass guitar (1996-2003)

Timeline

== Notes ==
=== References ===
- Sharpe-Young, Garry (2001). Rockdetector: A-Z of Black Metal (First printing ed.). London, Great Britain: Cherry Red Books. ISBN 1-901447308.
- Wagner, Jeff; Wilson, Steven (2010). Mean Deviation: Four Decades of Progressive Heavy Metal. Bazillion Points Books. ISBN 978-0-9796163-3-4.
