= Chrysoconia =

Scientific classification
- Kingdom: Fungi
- Division: Basidiomycota
- Class: Agaricomycetes
- Order: Boletales
- Family: Coniophoraceae
- Genus: Chrysoconia; McCabe & G.A. Escobar

Type species
- Chrysoconia orthospora McCabe & G.A. Escobar

Genus of fungi

Chrysoconia is a genus of fungi within the Coniophoraceae family. This is a monotypic genus, containing the single species Chrysoconia orthospora, found in Lake Union, Washington.
