= Subjectile =

The subjectile is the theoretical base or material foregrounding of an artistic painting. Famously, the word was used by Jacques Derrida to describe the work of Antonin Artaud. The subjectile is seen as a concept, and not necessarily as the actual frame, canvas, or base layer of material used in a given work of art. The subjectile is a tool that can be employed to analyze art-objects in order to generate hypotheses concerning the relationship between subject and object in art.

Derrida mentions that the word subjectile appears in an essay on Pierre Bonnard, published in 1921. The subjectile refers to Bonnard's use of cardboard for painting. The Concise French dictionary translates subjectile as "Art: support (beneath paint, etc.)". Without a support and ground, the subject of a painting could not exist, as it would fall away. Derrida argues that Artaud's subjectile is both ground and a support. It is stretched out, extended, beyond, through and behind the subject, it is not alien to the subject, yet ‘It has two situations’. Derrida holds that the subjectile functions as a hypothesis, and is a subjectile itself. ‘Subjectile, the word or the thing, can take the place of the subject or of the object – being neither one nor the other.’

Artaud mentions the subjectile three times in his writing. Derrida, in his essay "To Unsense the Subjectile", states ‘All three times, he is speaking of his own drawings, in 1932, 1946, and 1947’. The first time Artaud used the word was in a letter to André Rolland de Renéville, ‘Herewith a bad drawing in which what is called the subjectile betrayed me.’ In 1946, ‘This drawing is a grave attempt to give life and existence to what until today had never been accepted in art, the botching of the subjectile, the piteous awkwardness of forms crumbling around an idea after having for so many eternities labored to join it. The page is soiled and spoiled, the paper crumpled, the people drawn with the consciousness of a child.’ Finally in February 1947, ‘The figures on the inert page said nothing under my hand. They offered themselves to me like millstones which would not inspire the drawing, and which I could cut. Scrap, file, sew, unsew, slash, and stitch without the subjectile ever complaining through father or through mother.’

Derrida's essay was first published in French titled Forcener le Subjectile in 1986 by Gallimard and in an abridged English translation was published later (in 1998 by MIT press). For copyright reasons the images published in the Gallimard book were excluded from the later English translation, which contains instead photographs of Artaud taken by Georges Pastier in 1947, the year before Artaud died.

The subjectile is also commented on by Susan Sontag in her introduction to the edited translation of Artaud's works. and further in The Antonin Artaud Critical Reader, which includes texts by Gilles Deleuze, Derrida, and Sontag.

== See also ==
Listen to Antonin Artaud's radio play, To Have Done with the Judgement of God, originally banned from broadcast in 1947.

- Khôra
