= Strata (Strata album) =

Studio album by Strata
- Released: July 27, 2004
- Recorded: Final Mix, Campbell, CA; Klown, Santa Monica, CA; Westlake Audio, Hollywood, CA; SF Soundworks, San Francisco, CA.
- Genre: Alternative metal; alternative rock; post-hardcore; nu metal
- Length: 44:05
- Label: Wind-up
- Producer: Strata; Dan Certa; Steve Bruno

Strata chronology
Now the Industry... (2003)	Strata (2004)	Strata Presents The End of the World (2007)

Singles from Strata
- 1. "The Panic" Released: June 8, 2004; 2. "Never There" Released: January 25, 2005

Professional ratings
Review scores
Source	Rating
Allmusic	2.5/5 stars

Strata is the debut album by the American rock band Strata. The album was released on July 27, 2004 via Wind-up Records. The songs "Never There (She Stabs)" and "The Panic" were released as singles, both having music videos. "The Panic" was also featured on the soundtrack to the 2005 video game WWE WrestleMania 21.The song "Piece by Piece" was featured on the soundtrack to the 2004 movie The Punisher and the video game Madden NFL 2005. The album is largely a re-recorded version of their second independent album, When It's All Burning.

== Track listing ==
=== Original version ===
All tracks are written by Hrag Chanchanian, Eric Victoria, Adrian Robison, and Ryan Hernandez.

No.	Title	Length
1.	"Piece by Piece"	3:36
2.	"I Will Breathe Fire"	4:05
3.	"The Panic"	3:54
4.	"When It's All Burning"	4:44
5.	"Just Like Silk"	3:56
6.	"We've Changed"	4:02
7.	"Never There (She Stabs)"	3:43
8.	"Today"	3:42
9.	"Trustkilltrust"	1:52
10.	"Waiting"	2:52
11.	"You Are Eternal"	3:34
12.	"In a Sweet Dream"	4:05

=== "When It's All Burning" version ===
No.	Title	Length
1.	"In/evolve"	0:12
2.	"When It's All Burning"	4:35
3.	"You Are Eternal"	3:37
4.	"White Hot Light"	3:00
5.	"I Will Breathe Fire"	4:12
6.	"Piece By Piece"	3:39
7.	"Trust Kill Trust"	1:53
8.	"The Panic"	3:46
9.	"Waiting"	3:06
10.	"Never There"	3:40
11.	"Just Like Silk"	3:55
12.	"We've Changed"	4:05
13.	"In A Sweet Dream"	3:58
14.	"Out/slow To Home"	1:27

== Personnel ==
Strata

- Eric Victorino – Lead vocals, guitar on "Trust Kill Trust"
- Ryan Hernandez – Guitar, backing vocals, keyboards, piano, cello on "Today", additional vocals on "Just Like Silk" bass and programming on "Trust Kill Trust"
- Hrag Chanchanian – Bass guitar, backing whisper vocals on "Just Like Silk"
- Adrian Robison – Drums, percussion, breathing vocals on "Just Like Silk"

Additional musicians

- Gavin Hayes – Slide guitar on "When Its All Burning"

Management

- John Boyle – Management for Sanctuary Artist Management
- Doug LeDuc & Davud Weise – Business Management for Gleiberman, Weise, & Associates
- Jeffrey Light – Legal for Myman, Abell, Fineman, Greenspan, & Light, Los Angeles, CA
- Diana Meltzer – A&R
- Gregg Wattenberg – A&R/Wind-Up Records Production Supervisor
- Chipper – A&R Administration
- Philippa Murphy – A&R Coordination

Artwork

- Ed Sherman, Strata – Art Direction
- Aaron Marsh, Strata – Cover concept
- Tucker "Lumberg" Harrison – Cover star
- Sara Collins – Band photography
- Creatas/Dynamic Graphics – Crow photo
- Frank Veronsky – Additional photography

Production

- Produced & engineered by Strata
- Dan Certa – Additional production on tracks: 2,3, & 7, additional engineering on tracks: 2,7 & 10, mixing on track: 10
- Stevo Bruno – Additional production on tracks: 5 & 11. Additional engineering on tracks: 5,11, & 12
- Jay Baumgardner – Mixing, additional production track 6
- Mark Kiczula & Sergio Chavez – Assistant engineers
- Lior Goldenberg – Additional mixing engineering
- Don Budd – Additional engineering on tracks: 1,2,3,4,5,6,8,10 & 11
- Ted Jensen – Mastering
- Gregg Wattenberg – Additional engineering on track 8
