= Julia Kristeva =

Bulgarian philosopher (born 1941)

- Юлия Кръстева
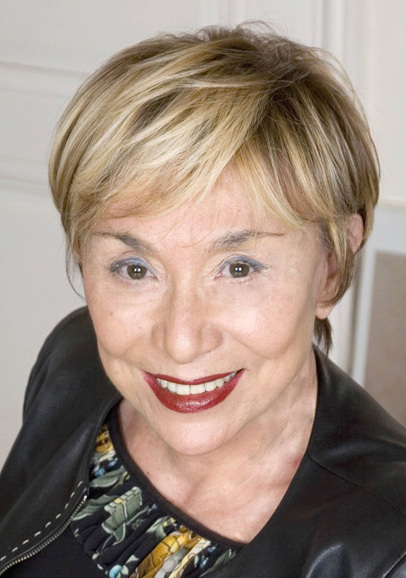
- Kristeva in 2008
- Born: Yuliya Stoyanova Krasteva; 24 June 1941 (age 85); Sliven, Kingdom of Bulgaria
- Spouse: Philippe Sollers (m. 1967)
- Awards: Holberg International Memorial Prize; Hannah Arendt Award for Political Thought; VIZE 97 Prize

Education
- Education: University of Sofia; EPHE
- Doctoral advisor: Lucien Goldmann
- Other advisor: Roland Barthes

Philosophical work
- Era: Contemporary philosophy
- Region: Western philosophy
- School: Continental philosophy; Psychoanalysis; Structuralism; Post-structural feminism; French feminism
- Institutions: University of Paris VII
- Main interests: Philosophy of language; Semiotics; Literary criticism; Philosophy of literature; Psychoanalysis; Feminism
- Website: kristeva.fr

Julia Kristeva (/ˈkrɪstəvə/; French: [kʁisteva]; born Yuliya Stoyanova Krasteva, Bulgarian: Юлия Стоянова Кръстева [ˈkrɤstɛvɐ]; on 24 June 1941) is a Bulgarian-French philosopher, literary critic, semiotician, psychoanalyst, feminist, and novelist who has lived in France since the mid-1960s. She has taught at Columbia University, and is now a professor emerita at Université Paris Cité. The author of more than 30 books, including Powers of Horror, Tales of Love, Black Sun: Depression and Melancholia, Proust and the Sense of Time, and the trilogy Female Genius, she has been awarded Commander of the Legion of Honor, Commander of the Order of Merit, the Holberg International Memorial Prize, the Hannah Arendt Prize, and the Vision 97 Foundation Prize, awarded by the Havel Foundation.

Kristeva became influential in international critical analysis, cultural studies and feminism after publishing her first book, Semeiotikè, in 1969. Her sizeable body of work includes books and essays that address intertextuality, the semiotic, and abjection, in the fields of linguistics, literary theory and criticism, psychoanalysis, biography and autobiography, political and cultural analysis, art and art history. She is prominent in structuralist and poststructuralist thought.

Kristeva is also the founder of the Simone de Beauvoir Prize committee.

== Life ==
Born in Sliven, Bulgaria to Christian parents, Kristeva is the daughter of a church accountant. On her mother's side, she has distant Jewish ancestry. Kristeva and her sister attended a Francophone school run by Dominican nuns. Kristeva became acquainted with the work of Mikhail Bakhtin at this time in Bulgaria. Kristeva went on to study at the University of Sofia, and while a postgraduate there obtained a research fellowship that enabled her to move to France in December 1965, when she was 24. She continued her education at EPHE, studying under Lucien Goldmann and Roland Barthes, among other scholars. On August 2, 1967, Kristeva married the novelist Philippe Sollers, born Philippe Joyaux.

Kristeva taught at Columbia University in the early 1970s, and remains a visiting professor. She has also published under the married name Julia Joyaux.

== Work ==
After joining the 'Tel Quel group' founded by Sollers, Kristeva focused on the politics of language and became an active member of the group. She trained in psychoanalysis, and earned her degree in 1979. In some ways, her work can be seen as trying to adapt a psychoanalytic approach to the poststructuralist criticism. For example, her view of the subject, and its construction, shares similarities with Sigmund Freud and Jacques Lacan. However, Kristeva rejects any understanding of the subject in a structuralist sense; instead, she favors a subject always "in process" or "on trial". In this way, she contributes to the poststructuralist critique of essentialized structures, whilst preserving the teachings of psychoanalysis. She travelled to China in the 1970s and later wrote About Chinese Women (1977).

=== The "semiotic" and the "symbolic" ===
One of Kristeva's most important contributions is that signification is composed of two elements, the symbolic and the semiotic, the latter being distinct from the discipline of semiotics founded by Ferdinand de Saussure. As explained by Augustine Perumalil, Kristeva's "semiotic is closely related to the infantile pre-Oedipal referred to in the works of Freud, Otto Rank, Melanie Klein, British Object Relation psychoanalysis, and Lacan's pre-mirror stage. It is an emotional field, tied to the instincts, which dwells in the fissures and prosody of language rather than in the denotative meanings of words." Furthermore, according to Birgit Schippers, the semiotic is a realm associated with the musical, the poetic, the rhythmic, and that which lacks structure and meaning. It is closely tied to the "feminine", and represents the undifferentiated state of the pre-Mirror Stage infant.

Upon entering the Mirror Stage, the child learns to distinguish between self and other, and enters the realm of shared cultural meaning, known as the symbolic. In Desire in Language (1980), Kristeva describes the symbolic as the space in which the development of language allows the child to become a "speaking subject," and to develop a sense of identity separate from the mother. This process of separation is known as abjection, whereby the child must reject and move away from the mother in order to enter into the world of language, culture, meaning, and the social. This realm of language is called the symbolic and is contrasted with the semiotic in that it is associated with the masculine, the law, and structure. Kristeva departs from Lacan in the idea that even after entering the symbolic, the subject continues to oscillate between the semiotic and the symbolic. Therefore, rather than arriving at a fixed identity, the subject is permanently "in process". Because female children continue to identify to some degree with the mother figure, they are especially likely to retain a close connection to the semiotic. This continued identification with the mother may result in what Kristeva refers to in Black Sun (1989) as melancholia (depression), given that female children simultaneously reject and identify with the mother figure.

It has also been suggested (e.g., Creed, 1993) that the degradation of women and women's bodies in popular culture (and particularly, for example, in slasher films) emerges because of the threat to identity that the mother's body poses: it is a reminder of time spent in the undifferentiated state of the semiotic, where one has no concept of self or identity. After abjecting the mother, subjects retain an unconscious fascination with the semiotic, desiring to reunite with the mother, while at the same time fearing the loss of identity that accompanies it. Slasher films thus provide a way for audience members to safely reenact the process of abjection by vicariously expelling and destroying the mother figure.

Kristeva is also known for her adoption of Plato’s idea of the chora, meaning "a nourishing maternal space" (Schippers, 2011). Kristeva's idea of the chora has been interpreted in several ways: as a reference to the uterus, as a metaphor for the relationship between the mother and child, and as the temporal period preceding the Mirror Stage. In her essay Motherhood According to Giovanni Bellini from Desire in Language (1980), Kristeva refers to the chora as a "non-expressive totality formed by drives and their stases in a motility that is as full of movement as it is regulated." She goes on to suggest that it is the mother's body that mediates between the chora and the symbolic realm: the mother has access to culture and meaning, yet also forms a totalizing bond with the child.

Kristeva is also noted for her work on the concept of intertextuality.

=== Anthropology and psychology ===
Kristeva argues that anthropology and psychology, or the connection between the social and the subject, do not represent each other, but rather follow the same logic: the survival of the group and the subject. Furthermore, in her analysis of Oedipus, she claims that the speaking subject cannot exist on his/her own, but that he/she "stands on the fragile threshold as if stranded on account of an impossible demarcation" (Powers of Horror, p. 85).

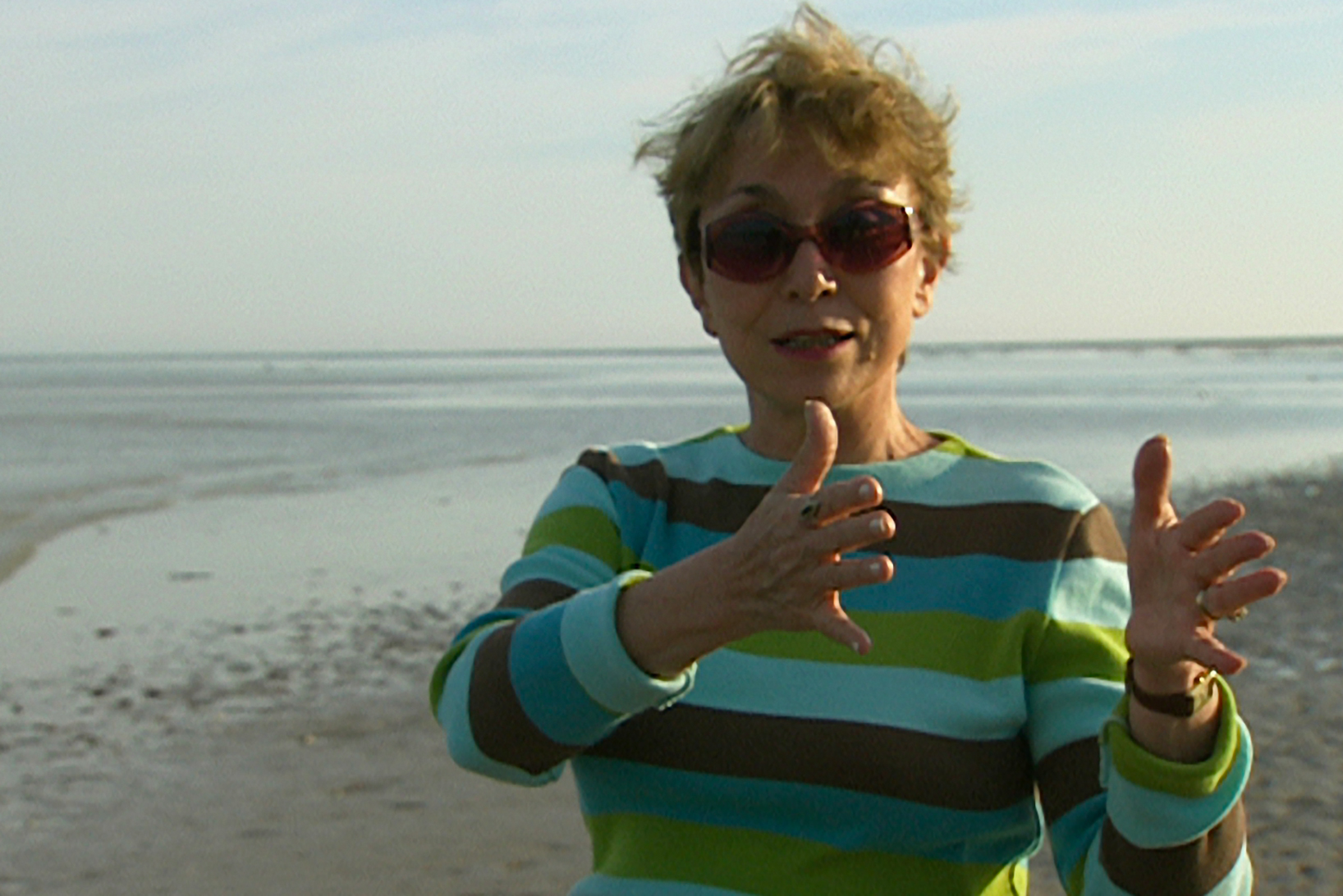
Julia Kristeva in 2005

In her comparison between the two disciplines, Kristeva claims that the way in which an individual excludes the abject mother as a means of forming an identity, is the same way in which societies are constructed. On a broader scale, cultures exclude the maternal and the feminine, and by this come into being.

== Feminism ==
Kristeva has been regarded as a key proponent of French feminism together with Simone de Beauvoir, Hélène Cixous, and Luce Irigaray. Kristeva has had a remarkable influence on feminism and feminist literary studies in the US and the UK, as well as on readings into contemporary art although her relation to feminist circles and movements in France has been quite controversial. Kristeva made a famous disambiguation of three types of feminism in "Women's Time" in New Maladies of the Soul (1993); while rejecting the first two types, including that of Beauvoir, her stance is sometimes taken to amount to a rejection of feminism altogether. Kristeva proposed the idea of multiple sexual identities against the joined code of "unified feminine language".

=== Denunciation of identity politics ===
Kristeva argues that her writings have been misunderstood by American feminist academics in the identity politics tradition. In Kristeva's view, it was not enough simply to dissect the structure of language in order to find its hidden meaning. Language should also be viewed through the prisms of history and of individual psychic and sexual experiences. This post-structuralist approach enabled specific social groups to trace the source of their oppression to the very language they used. However, Kristeva believes that it is harmful to posit collective identity above individual identity, and that this political assertion of sexual, ethnic, and religious identities is ultimately totalitarian.

== Novelist ==
Kristeva has written a number of novels that resemble detective stories. While the books maintain narrative suspense and develop a stylized surface, her readers also encounter ideas intrinsic to her theoretical projects. Her characters reveal themselves mainly through psychological devices, making her type of fiction mostly resemble the later work of Dostoevsky. Her fictional oeuvre, which includes The Old Man and the Wolves, Murder in Byzantium, and Possessions, while often allegorical, also approaches the autobiographical in some passages, especially with one of the protagonists of Possessions, Stephanie Delacour—a French journalist—who can be seen as Kristeva's alter ego. Murder in Byzantium deals with themes from orthodox Christianity and politics; she referred to it as "a kind of anti-Da Vinci Code".

== Honors ==
For her "innovative explorations of questions on the intersection of language, culture and literature", Kristeva was awarded the Holberg International Memorial Prize in 2004.

She won the 2006 Hannah Arendt Prize for Political Thought.

She was awarded Commander of the Legion of Honor in 2014, the Commander of the Order of Merit in 2011, and the Vaclav Havel Prize in 2008.

On October 10, 2019, she received an honoris causa doctorate from Universidade Católica Portuguesa.

In 2021, she was awarded the Prix de la Principauté by Les Rencontres Philosophiques de Monaco and the Prince Pierre Foundation.

== Scholarly reception ==
Roman Jakobson said that "Both readers and listeners, whether agreeing or in stubborn disagreement with Julia Kristeva, feel indeed attracted to her contagious voice and to her genuine gift of questioning generally adopted 'axioms,' and her contrary gift of releasing various 'damned questions' from their traditional question marks."

Roland Barthes comments that "Julia Kristeva changes the place of things: she always destroys the last prejudice, the one you thought you could be reassured by, could be take [sic] pride in; what she displaces is the already-said, the déja-dit, i.e., the instance of the signified, i.e., stupidity; what she subverts is authority—the authority of monologic science, of filiation."

Ian Almond criticizes Kristeva's ethnocentrism. He cites Gayatri Spivak's conclusion that Kristeva's book About Chinese Women "belongs to that very eighteenth century [that] Kristeva scorns" after pinpointing "the brief, expansive, often completely ungrounded way in which she writes about two thousand years of a culture she is unfamiliar with". Almond notes the absence of sophistication in Kristeva's remarks concerning the Muslim world and the dismissive terminology she uses to describe its culture and believers. He criticizes Kristeva's opposition which juxtaposes "Islamic societies" against "democracies where life is still fairly pleasant" by pointing out that Kristeva displays no awareness of the complex and nuanced debate ongoing among women theorists in the Muslim world, and that she does not refer to anything other than the Rushdie fatwa in dismissing the entire Muslim faith as "reactionary and persecutory".

In Impostures intellectuelles (1997), physics professors Alan Sokal and Jean Bricmont devote a chapter to Kristeva's use of mathematics in her early writings. They argue that Kristeva fails to show the relevance of the mathematical concepts she discusses to linguistics and the other fields she studies, and that no such relevance exists.

== Alleged collaboration with the Communist Regime in Bulgaria ==
In 2018, Bulgaria's state Dossier Commission announced that Kristeva had been an agent for the Committee for State Security under the code name "Sabina". She was supposedly recruited in June 1971, six years after she left Bulgaria to study in France. Under the People's Republic of Bulgaria, any Bulgarian who wanted to travel abroad had to apply for an exit visa and get an approval from the Ministry of Interior. The process was long and difficult because anyone who made it to the west could declare political asylum. Kristeva has called the allegations "grotesque and false". On 30 March, the state Dossier Commission began publishing online the entire set of documents reflecting Kristeva's activity as an informant of the former Committee for State Security. She vigorously denies the charges.

Neal Ascherson wrote, "the recent fuss about Julia Kristeva boils down to nothing much, although it has suited some to inflate it into a fearful scandal... But the reality shown in her files is trivial. After settling in Paris in 1965, she was cornered by Bulgarian spooks who pointed out to her that she still had a vulnerable family in the home country. So she agreed to regular meetings over many years, in the course of which she seems to have told her handlers nothing more than gossip about Aragon, Bataille & Co. from the Left Bank cafés – stuff they could have read in Le Canard enchaîné... the combined intelligence value of its product and her reports was almost zero. The Bulgarian security men seem to have known they were being played. But never mind: they could impress their boss by showing him a real international celeb on their books."

== Selected writings ==
=== Linguistic and literature ===
- Séméiôtiké: recherches pour une sémanalyse, Paris, Seuil, 1969 (trans. in Desire in Language: A Semiotic Approach to Literature and Art, New York, Columbia University Press, Blackwell, London, 1980)
- Le langage, cet inconnu: Une initiation à la linguistique, S.G.P.P., 1969; new ed., coll. Points, Seuil, 1981 (trans. in 1981 as Language. The Unknown: an Initiation into Linguistics, Columbia University Press, Harvester Wheatsheaf, London, 1989)
- La révolution du langage poétique: L'avant-garde à la fin du 19e siècle: Lautréamont et Mallarmé, Seuil, Paris, 1974 (abridged trans. containing only the first third of the original French edition, Revolution in Poetic Language, Columbia University Press, New York, 1984)
- Polylogue, Seuil, Paris, 1977 (trans. in Desire in Language: A Semiotic Approach to Literature and Art, New York, Columbia University Press, Blackwell, London, 1980)
- Histoires d’amour, Denoël, Paris, 1983 (trans. Tales of Love, Columbia University Press, New York, 1987)
- Le temps sensible. Proust et l’expérience littéraire, Gallimard, Paris, 1994 (trans. Time and Sense: Proust and the experience of literature, Columbia University Press, New York, 1996)
- Dostoïevski, Buchet-Chastel, Paris, 2020

=== Psychoanalysis and philosophy ===
- Pouvoirs de l’horreur. Essai sur l’abjection (trans. Powers of Horror: An Essay on Abjection, Columbia University Press, New York, 1982)
- Au commencement était l’amour. Psychanalyse et foi, Hachette, Paris, 1985 (trans. In the Beginning Was Love. Psychoanalysis and Faith, Columbia University Press, New York, 1987)
- Soleil Noir. Dépression et mélancolie, Gallimard, Paris, 1987 (trans. The Black Sun: Depression and Melancholia, Columbia University Press, New York, 1989)
- Etrangers à nous-mêmes, Fayard, Paris, 1988 (Strangers to Ourselves, Columbia University Press, New York, 1991)
- Lettre ouverte à Harlem Désir, Rivages, Paris, 1990, (trans. Nations without Nationalism. Columbia University Press, New York, 1993
- Les Nouvelles maladies de l’âme, Fayard, Paris, 1993 (trans. New Maladies of the Soul. Columbia University Press, New York, 1995)
- Sens et non sens de la révolte, Fayard, Paris, 1996 (trans. The Sense of Revolt, Columbia University Press, 2000)
- La Révolte intime, Fayard, 1997 (trans. Intimate Revolt, Columbia University Press, 2002)
- Le Génie féminin: la vie, la folie, les mots, Fayard, Paris, 1999–2002 (trans. Female Genius: Life, Madness, Words, Columbia University Press, New York, 2001–2004):
  - 1. Hannah Arendt ou l’action comme naissance et comme étrangeté, vol. 1, Fayard, Paris, 1999
  - 2. Melanie Klein ou le matricide comme douleur et comme créativité: la folie, vol. 2, Fayard, Paris, 2000
  - 3. Colette ou la chair du monde, vol. 3, Fayard, Paris, 2002
- Vision capitales, Réunion des musées nationaux, 1998 (trans. The Severed Head: capital visions, Columbia University Press, New York, 2012)
- L'érotisme maternel et son sens aujourd'hui. Les Rencontres Philosophiques de Monaco, 2017. Preface by Charlotte Casiraghi.

=== Autobiographical essays ===
- Des Chinoises, édition des Femmes, Paris, 1974 (About Chinese Women, Marion Boyars, London, 1977
- Du mariage considéré comme un des Beaux-Arts, Fayard, Paris, 2015 (Marriage as a Fine Art (with Philippe Sollers) Columbia University Press, New York 2016
- Je me voyage. Mémoires. Entretien avec Samuel Dock, Fayard, Paris, 2016 (A Journey Across Borders and Through Identities. Conversations with Samuel Dock, in The Philosophy of Julia Kristeva, ed. Sara Beardsworth, The Library of Living Philosophers, vo. 36, Open Cort, Chicago, 2020)

=== Collection of essays ===
- The Kristeva Reader, ed. Toril Moi, Columbia University Press, New York, 1986
- The Portable Kristeva, ed. Kelly Oliver, Columbia University Press, New York, 1997
- Crisis of the European Subject, Other Press, New York, 2000
- La Haine et le pardon, ed. with a foreword by Pierre-Louis Fort, Fayard, Paris, 2005 (trans. Hatred and forgiveness, Columbia University Press, New York, 2010)
- Pulsions du temps, foreword, edition and notes by David Uhrig, Fayard, Paris, 2013 (trans. Passions of Our Time, ed. with a foreword by Lawrence D. Kritzman, Columbia University Press, New York, 2019)
- "Epistolary Encounters." Collection of letters exchanged with Charlotte Casiraghi for a workshop series, Les Rencontres Philosophiques de Monaco. Air France Magazine. May 2016.
- Révolte et reliance. Collection: Cerisy - Colloques de Cerisy. Under the direction of Sarah-Anaïs Crevier Goulet, Beatriz Santos, Keren Mock, Nicolas Rabain. Essay "Souffrances inconnues" by Charlotte Casiraghi. Éditions Hermann, 2024. ISBN 9791037022820.

=== Novels ===
- Les Samouraïs, Fayard, Paris, 1990. Trans. The Samurai: A Novel, Columbia University Press, New York, 1992). ISBN 9780231075428. The ebook of the translation by Barbara Bray was released in 2025: ISBN 9780231563444.
- Le Vieil homme et les loups, Fayard, Paris, 1991. Trans. The Old Man and the Wolves, Columbia University Press, New York, 1994. ISBN 9780231220873. The ebook of the translation by Bray was released in 2025. ISBN 9780231563420.
- Possessions, Fayard, Paris, 1996 (trans. Possessions: A Novel, Columbia University Press, New York, 1998. Paperback: ISBN 9780231220880. Ebook: ISBN 9780231563437.
- Meurtre à Byzance, Fayard, Paris, 2004. Trans. Murder in Byzantium, Columbia University Press, New York, 2006.
- Thérèse mon amour : récit. Sainte Thérèse d’Avila, Fayard, 2008. Trans. Teresa, my love. An Imagined Life of the Saint of Avila, Columbia University Press, New York, 2014. ISBN 9780231520461.
- L’Horloge enchantée, Fayard, Paris, 2015. Trans. The Enchanted Clock, Columbia University Press, 2017.

== See also ==
- Capacity to be alone
- Écriture féminine
- Khôra
- List of thinkers influenced by deconstruction
