= Thermal destratification =

Method of stirring a confined fluid to achieve equal temperatures

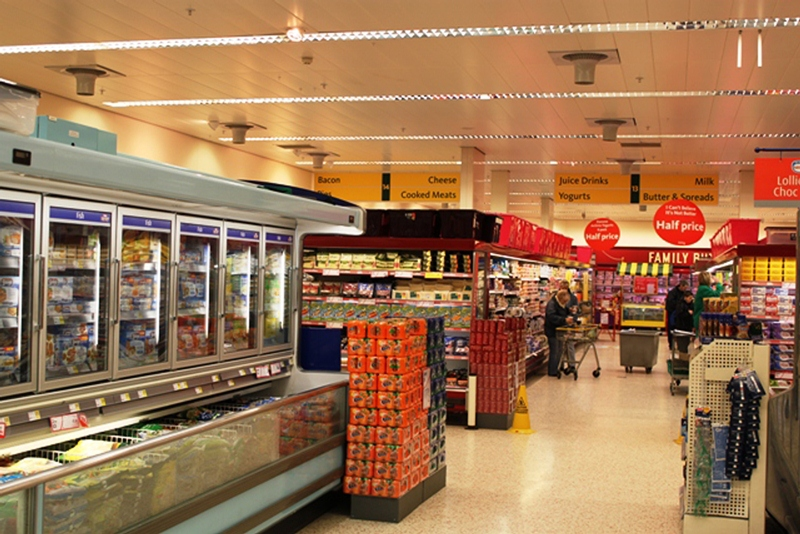
Destratification fans installed in UK Supermarket

Thermal destratification is the process of mixing the internal air in a building to eliminate stratified layers and achieve temperature equalization throughout the building envelope.

== Thermal stratification in buildings ==
Destratification is the reverse of the natural process of thermal stratification, which is the layering of differing (typically increasing) air temperatures from floor to ceiling. Stratification is caused by hot air rising up to the ceiling or roof space because it is lighter than the surrounding cooler air. Conversely, cool air falls to the floor as it is heavier than the surrounding warmer air.

In a stratified building, temperature differentials of up to 1.5°C per vertical foot is common, and the higher a building's ceiling, the more extreme this temperature differential can be. In extreme cases, temperature differentials of 10°C have been found over a height of 1 meter. Other variables that influence the level of thermal stratification include heat generated by people and processes present in the building, insulation of the space from outside weather conditions, solar gain, specification of the HVAC system, location of supply and return ducts, and vertical air movement inside the space, usually supplied by destratification fans. Computational fluid dynamics can be used to predict the level of stratification in a space.

=== Effects of thermal stratification ===
In a study conducted by the Building Scientific Research Information Association, the wasted energy due to stratification increased consistently based on temperature differential from floor to ceiling (ΔT). The study indicates that stratified buildings tend to overheat or overcool based on the temperature at the thermostat, which tends to be lower than the overall heat energy present in the room. The study also showed that energy waste due to stratification was present at ceiling heights ranging from 20 ft. to 40 ft, and higher ceilings caused higher energy waste, even at the same ΔT. Since ΔT tends to be higher in taller ceilings, the effect of stratification is compounded, causing substantial energy waste in high-ceiling buildings.

=== Definition of destratification ===
Since stratification and the costs associated with it are linear, the definition of destratification will differ based on opinion and use case. Full destratification, or a 0° ΔT from floor to ceiling, is unlikely to occur in any building. Since the costs of stratification decrease linearly as ΔT approaches 5.4°F, and no study has yet looked at the effects of stratification below 5.4°F, it is common to consider any space with a ΔT below 5°F to be destratified. In the United States, ASHRAE Standard 55 prescribes 3°C as the limit for the vertical air temperature difference between head and ankle levels, but has no standard recommending an ideal ΔT between floor and ceiling.

== Destratification technologies ==
Reducing thermal stratification can be accomplished by controlling the variables that are associated with increased stratification. Since many of the variables, including ceiling height, people and processes, solar gain, and outside weather conditions cannot be controlled, the most common technologies used are related to the building's HVAC (heating, ventilation, and air conditioning) system. One of the cheapest, most effective, and easiest to install technologies are destratification fans, including both axial destratification fans and HVLS (high-volume low-speed) fans.

=== Axial destratification fans ===
Axial destratification fans are self-contained units that are installed in an array at the ceiling with the goal of blowing conditioned air in the ceiling down to the floor, where people live and work. Because axial fans are designed to blow air straight down at the floor, they can be used in ceiling and roof structures over 100 ft. tall. Because axial destratification fans can achieve destratification with low CFMs, it is imperative that the air leaving the nozzle achieve an air speed at the floor of between 0.2 and 0.5 m/s. The result of this level of air movement is the integration of conditioned air from the ceiling with air at the floor level. Failing to impact the floor will result in destratification of medial layers of air but not achieve destratification at the floor. Since the area around the thermostat will not be destratified in this instance, it is hypothesized that there will be little or no cost savings, as the thermostat will continue to overheat or overcool the room.

An experiment in a room with a 21 ft. ceiling yielded a savings of 23.5% with the use of axial destratification fans.

=== High-volume low-speed (HVLS) fans ===
Because of their size, HVLS fans are normally installed in new construction, rather than retrofits, as the roof structure may have to be redesigned to accommodate the increased weight and size. It's not uncommon to require the relocation of lights, due to strobing as large fan blades pass under them, and sprinkler systems, which typically require unobstructed access to the floor to meet fire code. When used in the summer to encourage evaporative cooling, HVLS fans are run forward, blowing air at the floor. When used for destratification in the winter, the fans are run in reverse, blowing air towards ceiling which then circulates around the room. The height at which HVLS fans can be effective is limited compared to axial destratification fans.

== Benefits of destratification ==
This method has the most benefits through its application in the heating, ventilation, and air conditioning (HVAC) industry and in heating and cooling for buildings and it has been found that "stratification is the single biggest waste of energy in buildings today."

=== For reducing energy consumption ===
By incorporating thermal destratification technology into buildings, energy requirements are reduced as heating systems are no longer over-delivering in order to constantly replace the heat that rises away from the floor area, by redistributing the already heated air from the unoccupied ceiling space back down to floor level, until temperature equalisation is achieved. With regards to cooling destratification systems ensure the cooled air supplied is circulated fully and distributed evenly throughout internal environments, eliminating hot and cold spots and satisfying thermostats for longer periods of time. As a result, destratification technology has great potential for carbon emission reductions due to the reduced energy requirement, and is in turn capable of cutting costs for businesses, sometimes by up to 50%. This is supported by The Carbon Trust which recommends destratification in buildings as one of its top three methods to reduce carbon dioxide emissions.

=== For comfort ===
Destratification naturally increases air movement at the floor, reducing "hot spots" and "cold spots" in a room. It can be used in typically cold areas, like grocery store freezer cases, to warm patrons shopping nearby. In addition, air movement from destratification fans can be used to help meet ASHRAE Standard 62.1 by increasing the amount of air movement at the floor.
