= Spiritual Battle =

Studio album by Drottnar
- Released: 2000
- Recorded: May 1997, September 1998
- Genre: Death-doom, black metal
- Length: 39:16
- Label: Plankton (UK)

Drottnar chronology
A White Realm (1998)	Spiritual Battle (2000)	Anamorphosis (2003)

Professional ratings
Review scores
Source	Rating
Cross Rhythms	8/10 stars

Spiritual Battle is the first album by the Norwegian band Drottnar, released in 2000 on the British label Plankton Records. Spiritual Battle is a compilation album of the band's first two demos, both of which were recorded at X-Ray Studios.

== Music and lyrics ==
The songs "Away from the Destruction", "Doom of Antichrist", "Missing Souls" and "Frykt Ikke" are taken from the demo Doom of Antichrist, which was recorded in May 1997 when the group was known as Vitality. Musically, these songs focus on death/doom, and the vocals are deep, guttural death growls.

The songs "A White Realm", "Natten på Harmageddon" and "Spiritual Battle" were recorded in September 1998 when the group changed its name to Drottnar. Originally made for promotional purposes only, the CD was entitled A White Realm. Musically it emphasizes on folk-influenced black metal. The songs are minimalistic and focus on groovy rhythms.

The lyrics on the album deal with warfare in the spiritual realm. Spiritual Battle received positive reviews among critics; for example, Cross Rhythms gave it 8/10. The album also brought the band a following in the underground metal scene. During its release, the Info-Black.com - The Ultimate Black Metal Informative Site webzine claimed that Drottnar belonged to the elite of Scandinavian underground.

== Track listing ==
1. "A White Realm" (6:30)
2. "Natten på Harmageddon" (4:40) .mp3
3. "Spiritual Battle" (4:44) .mp3
4. "Away from the Destruction" (7:12)
5. "Doom of Antichrist" (5:39)
6. "Missing Souls" (4:08)
7. "Frykt Ikke" (6:21)
8. "Untitled" (0:47)

Track 8 is hidden.

== Personnel ==
- Sven-Erik Lind – vocals
- Karl Fredrik Lind – guitar
- Bjarne Peder Lind – bass
- Glenn-David Lind – drums
