= Stratified epithelial lining =

Stratified epithelial lining can refer to:

- Stratified squamous epithelium
- Stratified columnar epithelium
- Stratified cuboidal epithelium
