= Anamorphosis (EP) =

EP by Drottnar
- Released: 2003
- Recorded: 2003
- Genre: Technical black metal
- Length: 20:54
- Label: Momentum Scandinavia

Drottnar chronology
| Spiritual Battle (2000) | Anamorphosis (2003) | Welterwerk (2006) |

Anamorphosis is the first EP by Norwegian black metal band Drottnar. This EP was limited to 850 copies and was released in 2003 on Momentum Scandinavia label. The packaging contains a black matte cardboard slipcase with black print and an embossed Drottnar logo.

== Recording ==
The original bassist Bjarne Peder Lind left Drottnar before recording this EP, and he was replaced by Håvar Wormdahl. Also, a second guitarist, Bengt Olsson, joined the band for this EP's release. The release saw Drottnar abandoning their folk-influenced Viking black metal style for a more modern and highly technical black metal. Anamorphosis includes the intro "Morphosis" and three actual songs. Both the intro and "Sin Climax" contain violins.

Anamorphosis received mixed reviews. The EP was criticized for unbalanced soundscapes, dry and minimalistic drum sounds and lack of hooks.

== Track listing ==
1. "Morphosis" – 2:57
2. "The Individual Complex" – 5:56
3. "Sin Climax" – 6:58
4. "Concord" – 5:03

== Personnel ==
- Sven-Erik Lind – vocals
- Karl Fredrik Lind – guitar
- Bengt Olsson – guitar
- Håvar Wormdahl – bass
- Glenn-David Lind – drums
