= Powers of Horror =

1980 book by Julia Kristeva

Powers of Horror: An Essay on Abjection
- Author: Julia Kristeva
- Original title: Pouvoirs de l'horreur. Essai sur l'abjection
- Translator: Leon S. Roudiez
- Language: French
- Series: European perspectives
- Subject: Abjection
- Published: 1980 (Le Seuil, in French); 1982 (Columbia University Press, in English)
- Publication place: France
- Media type: Print
- Pages: 219 pp.
- ISBN: 0231053460
- OCLC: 8430152

Powers of Horror: An Essay on Abjection (French: Pouvoirs de l'horreur. Essai sur l'abjection) is a 1980 book by Julia Kristeva. The work is an extensive treatise on the subject of abjection, in which Kristeva draws on the theories of Sigmund Freud and Jacques Lacan to examine horror, marginalization, castration, the phallic signifier, the "I/Not I" dichotomy, the Oedipal complex, exile, and other concepts appropriate to feminist criticism and queer theory.

According to Kristeva, the abject marks a "primal order" that escapes signification in the symbolic order; the term is used to refer to the human reaction (horror, vomit) to a threatened breakdown in meaning caused by the loss of the distinction between subject and object, or between the self and the other.

== Compared to Lacan ==
Kristeva's understanding of the "abject" provides a helpful term to contrast to Lacan's objet petit a (or the "object - cause of desire"). Whereas the objet petit a allows a subject to coordinate his or her desires, thus allowing the symbolic order of meaning and intersubjective community to persist, the abject "is radically excluded and," as Kristeva explains, "draws me toward the place where meaning collapses". It is neither object nor subject; the abject is situated, rather, at a place before we entered into the symbolic order. (On the symbolic order, see, in particular, the Lacan module on psychosexual development.) As Kristeva puts it, "Abjection preserves what existed in the archaism of pre-objectal relationship, in the immemorial violence with which a body becomes separated from another body in order to be". The abject marks what Kristeva terms a "primal repression," one that precedes the establishment of the subject's relation to its objects of desire and of representation, before even the establishment of the opposition between consciousness and the unconscious.

Kristeva refers, instead, to the moment in our psychosexual development when we established a border or separation between human and animal, between culture and that which preceded it. On the level of archaic memory, Kristeva refers to the primitive effort to separate ourselves from the animal: "by way of abjection, primitive societies have marked out a precise area of their culture in order to remove it from the threatening world of animals or animalism, which were imagined as representatives of sex and murder". On the level of our individual psychosexual development, the abject marks the moment when we separated ourselves from the mother, when we began to recognize a boundary between "me" and other, between "me" and "(m)other." (See the Kristeva Module on Psychosexual Development.) The abject is "a precondition of narcissism". which is to say, a precondition for the narcissism of the mirror stage, which occurs after we establish these primal distinctions. The abject thus at once represents the threat that meaning is breaking down and constitutes our reaction to such a breakdown: a reestablishment of our "primal repression." The abject has to do with "what disturbs identity, system, order. What does not respect borders, positions, rules".and, so, can also include crimes like Auschwitz. Such crimes are abject precisely because they draw attention to the "fragility of the law".

== Eruption of the Real ==
More specifically, Kristeva associates the abject with the eruption of the Real into our lives. In particular, she associates such a response with our rejection of death's insistent materiality. Our reaction to such abject material recharges what is essentially a pre-lingual response. Kristeva, therefore, is quite careful to differentiate knowledge of death or the meaning of death (both of which can exist within the symbolic order) from the traumatic experience of being actually confronted with the sort of materiality that traumatically shows one's own death:

"A wound with blood and pus, or the sickly, acrid smell of sweat, of decay, does not signify death. In the presence of signified death—a flat encephalograph, for instance—I would understand, react, or accept. No, as in true theater, without makeup or masks, refuse and corpses show me what I permanently thrust aside in order to live. These body fluids, this defilement, this shit are what life withstands, hardly and with difficulty, on the part of death. There, I am at the border of my condition as a living being."

The corpse especially exemplifies Kristeva's concept since it literalizes the breakdown of the distinction between subject and object that is crucial for the establishment of identity and for our entrance into the symbolic order. What we are confronted with when we experience the trauma of seeing a human corpse (particularly the corpse of a friend or family member) is our own eventual death made palpably real. As Kristeva puts it, "The corpse, seen without God and outside of science, is the utmost of abjection. It is death infecting life. Abject".

== Comparison with desire ==
The abject must also be distinguished from desire (which is tied up with the meaning-structures of the symbolic order). It is associated, rather, with both fear and jouissance. In phobia, Kristeva reads the trace of a pre-linguistic confrontation with the abject, a moment that precedes the recognition of any actual object of fear: "The phobic object shows up at the place of non-objectal states of drive and assumes all the mishaps of drive as disappointed desires or as desires diverted from their objects". The object of fear is, in other words, a substitute formation for the subject's abject relation to drive. The fear of, say, heights really stands in the place of a much more primal fear: the fear caused by the breakdown of any distinction between subject and object, of any distinction between ourselves and the world of dead material objects (reference page?).

Kristeva also associates the abject with jouissance: "One does not know it, one does not desire it, one joys in it [on en jouit]. Violently and painfully. A passion". This statement appears paradoxical, but what Kristeva means by such statements is that we are, despite everything, continually and repetitively drawn to the abject (much as we are repeatedly drawn to trauma in Freud's understanding of repetition compulsion). To experience the abject in literature carries with it a certain pleasure but one that is quite different from the dynamics of desire. Kristeva associates this aesthetic experience of the abject, rather, with poetic catharsis: "an impure process that protects from the abject only by dint of being immersed in it".

== Purifying the abject ==
The abject for Kristeva is, therefore, closely tied both to religion and to art, which she sees as two ways of purifying the abject: "The various means of purifying the abject—the various catharses—make up the history of religions, and end up with that catharsis par excellence called art, both on the far and near side of religion". According to Kristeva, the best modern literature (Fyodor Dostoyevsky, Marcel Proust, Jorge Luis Borges, Antonin Artaud, Louis-Ferdinand Céline, Franz Kafka, etc.) explores the place of the abject, a place where boundaries begin to break down, where people are confronted with an archaic space before such linguistic binaries as self/other or subject/object.

The transcendent or sublime, for Kristeva, is really our effort to cover over the breakdowns (and subsequent reassertion of boundaries) associated with the abject; and literature is the privileged space for both the sublime and abject: "On close inspection, all literature is probably a version of the apocalypse that seems to me rooted, no matter what its sociohistorical conditions might be, on the fragile border (borderline cases) where identities (subject/object, etc.) do not exist or only barely so—double, fuzzy, heterogeneous, animal, metamorphosed, altered, abject". According to Kristeva, literature explores the way that language is structured over a lack, a want. She privileges poetry, in particular, because of poetry's willingness to play with grammar, metaphor and meaning, thus laying bare the fact that language is at once arbitrary and limned with the abject fear of loss: "Not a language of the desiring exchange of messages or objects that are transmitted in a social contract of communication and desire beyond want, but a language of want, of the fear that edges up to it and runs along its edges".
