= Black Sun (Kristeva book) =

Book by Julia Kristeva

Black Sun: Depression and Melancholia
- Author: Julia Kristeva
- Translator: Leon S. Roudiez
- Language: French
- Publication date: 1989

Black Sun: Depression and Melancholia is a book by Julia Kristeva, published in 1989. It was translated from French to English by Leon S. Roudiez.

In his review in The New York Times, Perry Meisel called the book "an absorbing meditation on depression and melancholia".
