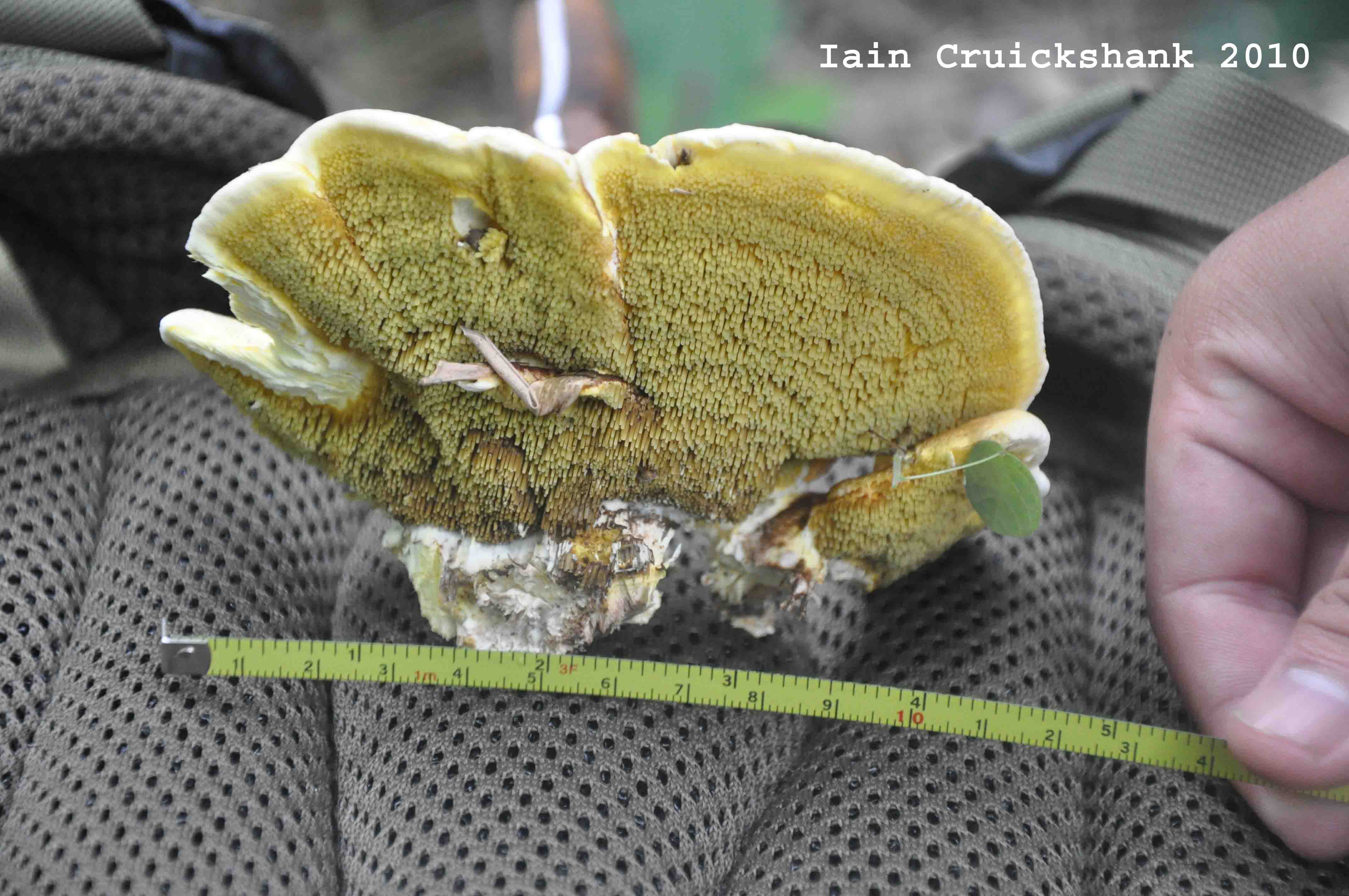
- Gyrodontium sacchari in Hua Hin, Thailand

Scientific classification
- Kingdom: Fungi
- Division: Basidiomycota
- Class: Agaricomycetes
- Order: Boletales
- Family: Boletaceae
- Genus: Gyrodontium; Pat.

Type species
- Gyrodontium sacchari (Spreng.) Hjortstam

Species
- G. boveanum G. sacchari G. versicolor

= Gyrodontium =

Genus of fungi

Gyrodontium is a genus of fungi in the family Boletaceae. There are three species in the genus, which have a widespread distribution.
