= Miriam Mehadipur =

Israeli artist (born 1960)

- מרים מהדיפור
- Born: May 25, 1960 (age 66) 's-Hertogenbosch, the Netherlands
- Website: mehadipurandcollection.com

Miriam Mehadipur (Hebrew: מרים מהדיפור; born May 25, 1960) is an Israeli Dutch artist. Born in 's-Hertogenbosch, Netherlands, she moved to Israel in 1999 with her Persian-Jewish husband, Menachem Mehadipur.

Mehadipur often explores different aspects of women in her paintings. She has painted female figures from the Bible and strives to portray their serenity and calmness in order to allow the viewer a glimpse at her vision of their inner beauty and strength.

A number of Miriam's paintings are framed by her husband, Menachem, who designs and carves the wooden frames.
