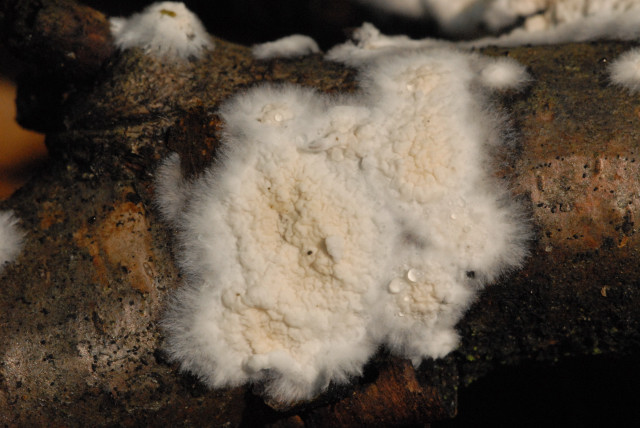
- Coniophora puteana

Scientific classification
- Kingdom: Fungi
- Division: Basidiomycota
- Class: Agaricomycetes
- Order: Boletales
- Family: Coniophoraceae; Ulbr.

Type genus
- Coniophora DC.

Genera
- Chrysoconia McCabe & G.A.Escobar; Coniophora DC.; Coniophorella; Coniophoropsis Hjortstam & Ryvarden; Gyrodontium Pat.; Penttilamyces Zmitr., Kalinovskaya & Myasnikov; Sedecula Zeller

Synonyms
- Chrysoconiaceae Jülich

= Coniophoraceae =

Family of fungi

The Coniophoraceae are a family of fungi in the Aphyllophorales order. The family contains 6 genera and 28 species.
