= Substrate (building) =

The word substrate comes from the Latin sub - stratum meaning 'the level below' and refers to any material existing or extracted from beneath the topsoil, including sand, chalk and clay. The term is also used for materials used in building foundations or else incorporated into plaster, brick, ceramic and concrete components, which are sometimes called 'filler' products.

== See also ==
- Firestop
- Sealant
- Caulking
- Paint
