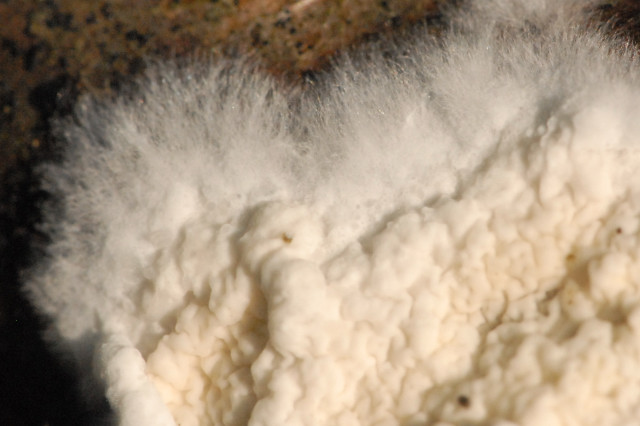
- Coniophora puteana

Scientific classification
- Kingdom: Fungi
- Division: Basidiomycota
- Class: Agaricomycetes
- Order: Boletales
- Family: Coniophoraceae
- Genus: Coniophora; DC. (1815)

Type species
- Coniophora membranacea DC. (1815)

Synonyms
- Aldridgea Massee (1892); Coniophorella P. Karst. (1889)

= Coniophora =

Genus of fungi

Coniophora is a genus of fungi within the order Boletales. Basidiocarps (fruit bodies) are corticioid (patch-forming). There are 20 species in the genus, which has a widespread distribution. One notable member is the cellar fungus (C. puteana), which causes wet rot in wood. Molecular analysis has revealed that there are cryptic species in the fungal lineages Coniophora olivacea, C. arida, and C. puteana.

== Species ==
- C. arida (Fr.) P.Karst.
- C. capnoides Ellis & Everh.
- C. dimitica G. Cunn.
- C. elegans Höhn.
- C. eremophila Lindsey & Gilb.
- C. flava Burt
- C. fuscata Bres. & Torrend
- C. fusispora (Cooke & Ellis) Cooke
- C. hanoiensis Pat.
- C. harperi Burt
- C. ladoi Tellería
- C. lichenoides Massee
- C. marmorata Desm.
- C. matzuzawae Yasuda
- C. media Bourdot & Galzin
- C. merulioides Falck
- C. minor G.Cunn.
- C. mollis Ginns
- C. olivacea (Fr.) P.Karst.
- C. opuntiae Tellería
- C. prasinoides (Bourdot & Galzin) Bourdot & Galzin
- C. puteana (Shum.: Fr.) P.Karst
- C. submembranacea (Berk. & Broome) Cooke
