= Charles Rycroft =

British psychiatrist (1914–1998)

Charles Frederick Rycroft
- Born: September 9, 1914
- Died: May 24, 1998
- Education: Trinity College, Cambridge; University College London
- Known for: A Critical Dictionary of Psychoanalysis
- Scientific career
- Fields: Psychiatry, Psychoanalysis
- Institutions: Maudsley Hospital; Tavistock Clinic

Charles Frederick Rycroft (/ˈraɪkrɒft/; 9 September 1914 – 24 May 1998) was a British psychiatrist and psychoanalyst. He studied medicine at University College London, and worked briefly as a psychiatrist for the Maudsley Hospital. For most of his career he had a private psychiatric practice in London. He was the author of a number of notable books, including A Critical Dictionary of Psychoanalysis (1968), The Innocence of Dreams (1979) and Psychoanalysis and Beyond (1985).

== Background ==
=== Early life ===
Rycroft was the second eldest son of Sir Richard Rycroft 5th Baronet (1859–1925) (see Rycroft Baronets) and Emily Mary Lowry-Corry ( see 2nd Earl Belmore). He grew up in Dummer, Hampshire, where his family owned most of the village and his father was "the local representative of both Church and State". He had one elder brother, Henry Richard Rycroft DSC OBE RN (1911–1985), and two younger sisters: Alice Juliana Rosamond Rycroft (1915–2006) and Eleanor Mary Rycroft (1918–2000). He also had two elder half-brothers, Nelson and Richard Michael, and a third, Veloyne, who died in infancy.

=== Education ===
He was educated at Wellington College and then studied economics and history at Trinity College, Cambridge. He became interested in psychoanalysis and on applying to Ernest Jones was encouraged to study medicine. He studied at University College London and training at the Maudsley Hospital. He underwent analysis firstly with Ella Freeman Sharpe and after her death with Sylvia Payne (inspiring a joke about the "sharps" and "pains" of analytic training).

== Career ==
Rycroft practised as a psychoanalyst from 1947 but became disillusioned because of the rivalry between the Kleinian and Freudian factions. He was influenced by W. R. D. Fairbairn and D. W. Winnicott from the Middle Group in developing his own views.

He was a critic of contemporary psychoanalysis, believing it to be rigid and formulaic. He believed that the ideal of rationality proposed by modern psychiatry alienated the adult from his or her creative inner processes. His work with dream analysis stressed the positive aspects of imagination, and thought imagination could be beneficial to psychic development. In 1968 he resigned from the British Psychoanalytical Society, feeling that "the real power in the Society belonged to people of whose values I did not approve...their ways of conducting business and engaging in controversy were entirely alien to me".

Rycroft was a consultant psychoanalyst at the Tavistock Clinic from 1956 until 1968, and for a period of time was an assistant editor of the International Journal of Psychoanalysis and a training analyst with Scottish psychologist R.D. Laing. He was elected a Fellow of the Royal College of Psychiatrists in 1973.

Rycroft wrote a number of works, of which the best known book is A Critical Dictionary of Psychoanalysis. He wrote extensively in a wide range of magazines, including The Observer and The New York Review of Books.

== Publications ==
- Critical Dictionary of Psychoanalysis (1968)
- Imagination and Reality
- Anxiety and Neurosis
- Reich (Fontana Modern Masters, 1971)
- The Innocence of Dreams (1979)
- Psychoanalysis and Beyond (1985)
- Viewpoints
