= Margaret Little =

British psychoanalyst (1901–1994)

Margaret Isabel Little
- Born: 21 May 1901; Bedford, Bedfordshire, England
- Died: 27 November 1994 (aged 93); Tunbridge Wells, Kent, England

Margaret I. Little (21 May 1901 – 27 November 1994) was a British psychoanalyst of the British Middle Group, and an influential figure in the creation of object relations theory, particularly as an early proponent of the utility of countertransference in the analytic process.

== Training and contributions ==
Little's second analysis was with Ella Freeman Sharpe, and her third with D. W. Winnicott; and it was out of her experiences as analysand that she wrote her seminal article of 1951 on 'Counter-transference and the patient's response to it'. There she insisted on the element of reality in the patient's perception of the analyst, and the way it could serve as a mirror for the analyst in illuminating the countertransference. She continued her exploration of the total quality of the analyst's response to the patient in later writings.

She also took issue with what she saw as the coercive side of free association, maintaining that "We no longer 'require' our patients to tell us everything that is in their minds. On the contrary, we give them permission to do so".

== Selected writings ==
- '"R" - The Analyst's Total Response to His Patient's Needs', International Journal of Psycho-Analysis 38 (1957) 240-54
- 'On the value of regression to dependence', Free Associations (1987) 10:7-22
- Transference Neurosis and Transference Psychosis (1981)

== See also ==
- Body-centred countertransference
- Paula Heimann
- Robert Langs
