= Neville Symington =

British psychoanalyst

Neville Symington (3 July 1937 – 3 December 2019) was a member of the Middle Group of British Psychoanalysts which argues that the primary motivation of the child is object-seeking rather than drive gratification. He published a number of books on psychoanalytic topics, and was President of the Australian Psychoanalytical Society from 1999 to 2002.

== Life and career ==
Neville Symington was born in Portugal, and was a Catholic priest before becoming a psychoanalyst. He worked in England at the Tavistock Clinic, and the British Institute of Psycho-Analysis, before emigrating to Australia in 1986.

== On narcissism ==
Symington was perhaps best known for his work on narcissism, which he considered to be the central psychopathology underlying all others. Symington introduced the concept of the 'lifegiver' as a kind of transitional object made up from the healthy part of the self combined with aspects of the motherer, and considered that narcissism emerged from the rejection of that object, and with it a sense of an authentically lived existence.

The result of that refusal is that, in Polly Young-Eisendrath's terms, "in place of autonomy, the adult...would come to obey an internal source that the psychoanalyst Neville Symington calls the 'discordant source'".

== Religion and psychoanalysis ==
The origins of his book on narcissism came about, in Symington's words, when "I started to work on the subject of Psychoanalysis and Religion, and it came to me quite early in that research that the connecting link between the two disciples was narcissism". Both subjects were very close to Symington's central concerns. A former priest, Symington in his later writings returned to an exploration of religion alongside that of the mystical elements in psychology.

Symington declared that "[Psychoanalysis] is a natural religion but not a revealed one", its goal of arriving at the depressive position being an inherently moral one. His distinction has been followed up by many analysts who take a positive view of religion in a Winnicottian tradition.

=== Criticism ===
Others, however, consider that Symington's search for a positive interrelationship between psychoanalysis and religion leads inevitably to a certain moralism – psychoanalysis being what Adam Phillips called "a moral enterprise...that has to work hard not to become a moralistic one'.

Robert M. Young took specific exception to what he saw as a pontifical element in Symington's study of W. R. Bion, considering that it could be attributed to the religious subtext in Symington's recent writings.

== Training, spontaneity and truth ==
Nina Coltart, in expressing some of her own doubts about psychoanalytic training, noted that "Neville Symington...is of the opinion that a long personal analysis, which we all have as part of our training, leaves the narcissism stronger, and the ego weaker, than they were at the beginning".

Symington had from early on emphasised the importance of the analyst's spontaneity – what he called "the analyst's act of freedom as agent of therapeutic change" – something which may be linked to his existential viewpoint on narcissism.

Symington maintained that "truth in psychoanalysis emerges between the analyst and the patient and...demands that a preconception is abandoned in both".

== On emotions ==
Neville Symington regards the emotional life of individual woman and man as central for its well-being and relation to others. He sees that when we are not able of having an inner emotional life we are in a tragic situation. Through emotions we communicate with each other.

"The conclusion we came up with was that emotions are the elements inside us that are the units of communication." p. 46

Symington believes that for experiencing joy one must also be able to feel sadness.

Symington believes that envy, greed and jealousy are problematic when not accepted within the person, because they tend to create a toxic inner and outer situation, when not embraced inside oneself. According to Symington envy, greed and jealousy:"... act in concert."

A personal inner creative act of acceptance of the three emotions is Symington's solution.

== Cultural offshoots ==
Jeanette Winterson found the plainness and straightforwardness of Symington's writing style offered something of a framework for her mid-life journey through madness.

Winterson states: "Symington talks about how the mad part will try to wreck the mind. That had been my experience".

== Acclamations ==
In 2013 Neville Symington was awarded with The Sigourney Award: "Mr. Symington’s work features independent thinking that offers a counterpoint to various schools of established thought regarding narcissism and the source of mental illness."

Dr. Peter March: "Symington´s answer rests upon Einstein´s insight: some relations are of the essence of the things related. Symington´s relational account of persons challenges our conventional understanding to the breaking point: by reconceptualizing emotions, persons and human relations, we break through to a brilliant new way of understanding the work of psychiatrist and psychotherapists. One must expect that Symington´s relational account of persons will affect our psychiatry as deeply as Einsteins work our physics."

== Death ==
Symington died in Sydney, Australia, on 3 December 2019, at the age of 82.

== Publications ==
- The Analytic Experience (1986) - Free Association Books. ISBN 978-0-946960-30-9
- Narcissism: A New Theory (London 1993) Karnac (Books). ISBN 978-1-85575-047-0
- Emotion and Spirit (London 1994) – Routledge. ISBN 978-1-85575-203-0
- Co-authored: Joan and Neville Symington, The Clinical Thinking of Wilfred Bion (East Sussex and New York 1996) Routledge. ISBN 978-0-415-09353-8
- The Making of a Psychotherapist (1997) Routledge. ISBN 978-1-85575-139-2
- The Spirit of Sanity (London 2001) – Religion and Psychoanalysis. Karnac (Books). ISBN 978-1-85575-265-8
- A Pattern of Madness (London 2002) Karna Books. ISBN 978-1-85575-279-5
- The Blind Man Sees (London 2004) – Essays. Karnac Books. ISBN 978-1-85575-984-8
- A Priest's Affair (Free Association Books, 2004) ISBN 978-1-85343-764-9
- A Healing Conversation - How Healing Happens (London 2006) - Karnac (Books). ISBN 978-1-85575-359-4
- Symington, Neville (2007). Becoming a Person through Psychoanalysis. London: Karnac Books. ISBN 9781855755406.
- In-gratitude and Other Poems (2010) Karnac Books. ISBN 978-1-85575-823-0
- The Psychology of The Person (London 2012) Karnac Books. ISBN 978-1-78049-069-4
- A Different Path - An Emotional Autobiography (2018) Sphinx Books. ISBN 978-1-912573-57-8
- The Growth of Mind (Oxon and New York 2019) Routledge. ISBN 978-1-138-32783-2

== Articles ==
- "The response aroused by the psychopath", International Review of Psycho-Analysis 7 (1980)
- "The analyst's act of freedom as agent of therapeutic change" Int Rev of P-A 10 (1983)

== See also ==
- Joseph J. Sandler
- Melanie Klein
- Self psychology
- True self and false self § Symington
- D. W. Winnicott
