= British Independent Group (psychoanalysis) =

Formative British psychoanalysis group

The Independent or Middle Group of British analysts represents one of the three distinct sub-schools of the British Psychoanalytical Society, and 'developed what is known as the British independent perspective, which argued that the primary motivation of the child is object-seeking rather than drive gratification'. The 'Independent group...is strongly associated with the concept of countertransference as well as with a seemingly pragmatic, anti-theoretical attitude to psychoanalysis'.

== Origins ==
In the wake of the wartime Controversial Discussions, 'the British Psycho-Analytical Society divided into several sets of followers – eventually three sets in one'. On the one side, were the followers of Melanie Klein, on the other those of Anna Freud, and 'in between, as a kind of buffer zone, were the British group who came to be known as "Independents" – Sylvia Payne, Marjorie Brierley, Ronald Fairbairn and Ella Freeman Sharpe, and eventually Donald Winnicott and Paula Heimann, who moved away from the Kleinian group'. Subsequently, 'some new refugees, notably Michael Balint and Michael Foulkes, became prominent Independents'.

== Development ==
From that beginning, 'the buffer group of Independents, notably Donald Winnicott, began to make original contributions of their own and to mark a distinctive character for the group'. Alongside the Kleinians the "Middle Group" represented 'the other division of psychoanalysts who use "object-relations" theory', and for some 'has formed the central core of the British Psychoanalytical Society...interprets in terms of either the Oedipal or the pre-Oedipal relationship'. D. W. Winnicott was arguably 'for many years the most prominent member of the Independent Group in the British Psycho-Analytical Society, and as such in complete opposition to both classical analysis and Kleinian theory...but he consistently denied that he was its leader'. Certainly, among the Independents, 'the four British psychoanalysts who by their writing and teaching have had the biggest influence on psychoanalysis...are Ronald Fairbairn, Michael Balint, John Bowlby, and Donald Winnicott....Related ideas have been developed and applied by such writers as Marion Milner and Charles Rycroft'.

'Contemporary publications for the Independent Group include those of Christopher Bollas, Patrick Casement, Eric Rayner and Harold Stewart'. Others known through their writings include 'Nina Coltart, Neville Symington...Gregorio Kohon, Roger Kennedy, [&] Rob Hale'.

For Eric Rayner, 'what characterises the British Independents' – 'there are about 130 paid up members now; some are explicitly close to the Kleinians, others incline to the Contemporary Freudians' – is that 'most owe ideas to both sides; and probably all follow approaches from their forebears in the original British Society, not to mention other theorists as well...The Independents have many differences of opinion about theory and technique, but they share a basic attitude in common. This is to evaluate and respect ideas for their use and truth value – no matter from whence they come'.

== Influence of the British independents ==
The influence of the British object relations school has been widespread and increasing in the psychoanalytic world. Initially, it might prove more attractive to the analytic maverick. Thus for example Eric Berne for his part considered that 'Fairbairn is one of the best heuristic bridges between transactional analysis and psychoanalysis'. Similarly Lacan paid tribute to 'the notion of transitional object, introduced by D. W. Winnicott, which is a key-point for the explanation of the genesis of fetishism'; and his followers argued that the Middle Group's object relations led directly to Lacan: 'Winnicott glimpsed the transitional object. That is what Lacan sums up, condenses, justifies and constructs with object a'.

Gradually, however, their influence entered the mainstream. 'British object relations theory influenced North American psychoanalysis over the last thirty years' of the twentieth century to an ever-increasing degree, beginning with figures like Arnold Modell, Heinz Kohut and Otto Kernberg. 'The English object-relations people (D. W. Winnicott, W. R. D. Fairbairn, Michael Balint, Harry Guntrip, and others) who predate and foreshadow the Kohut and the Kernberg groups' were a major influence upon them, (openly acknowledged or not), so that for example arguably 'Kohut offers essentially the same program...[as] Winnicott and Balint'.

Thereafter the late twentieth century saw a 'remarkable confluence of...ego psychology and object relations..."a certain kind of rapprochement of the two traditions" in which object relations had certainly the greater part to play, (despite the Lacanian grumble that 'crossing one with the other in varying quantities...is no substitute for Lacan's "return to Freud"'). As a result, it is at least arguable that 'Object relations theory...has become the organising set of ideas in modern psychoanalysis worldwide'.

== Criticism ==
Because of their theoretical open-mindedness, 'one of the criticisms levelled at the independent psychoanalysts in the British Society is that they are said to be "woolly minded"'. Alternatively, because 'Independents do not offer a general explanatory scheme...they have been called "terminally open-minded"'. There is, however, growing recognition in psychodynamic psychotherapy of the benefits of 'draw[ing] on several theoretical models, reflecting the pluralism in the field today', as well as of the way 'the therapist's personality places a personal stamp on the therapy conducted' – thereby strengthening the Independent Group's awareness that the therapist, 'to encompass the diversity of clinical phenomena that will be encountered...cannot afford to be too monogamously wedded to one particular theory'.

== See also ==
- Good enough parent
