= Melitta Schmideberg =

Slovak-born British-American psychoanalyst

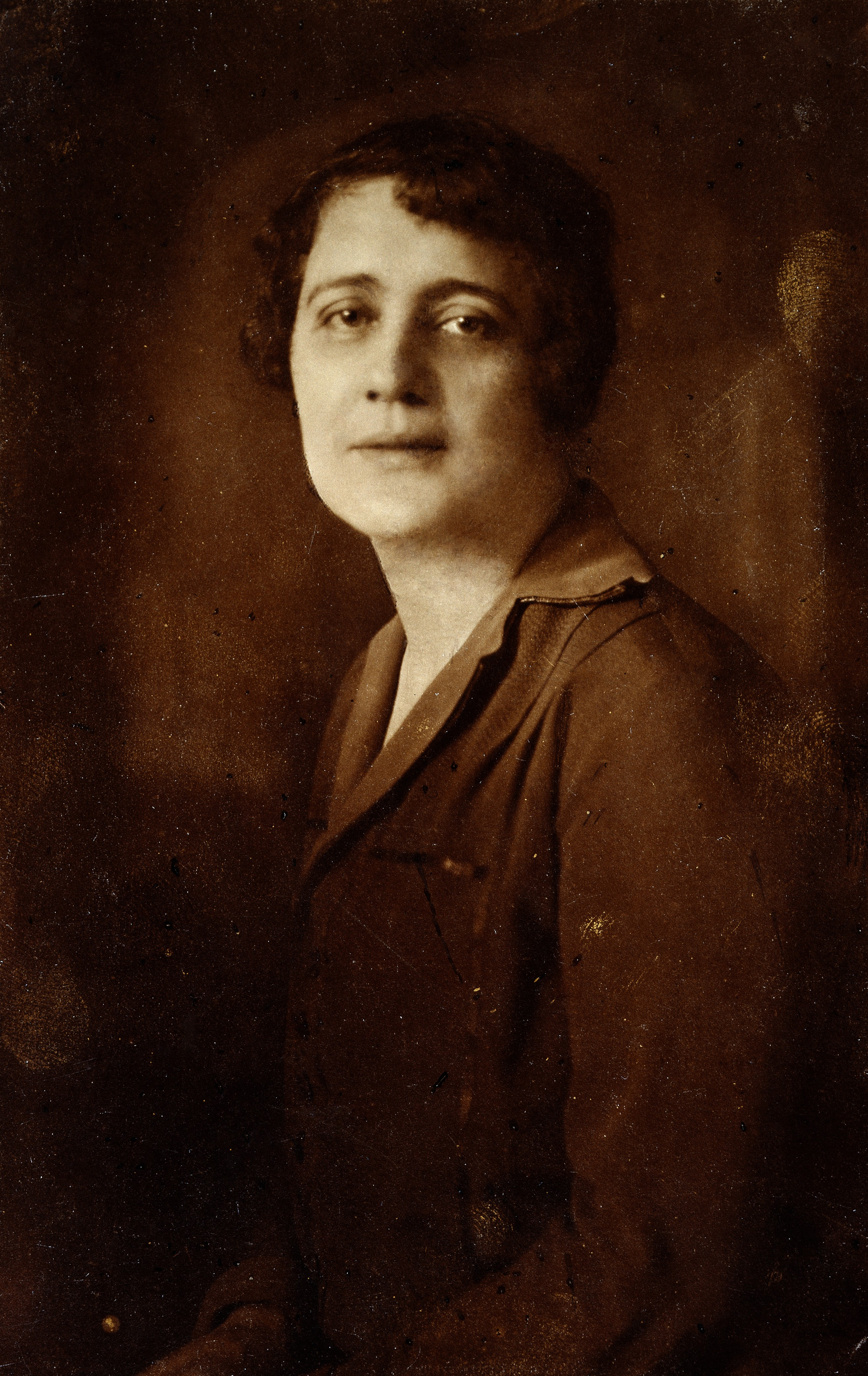
- Schmideberg c. 1925
- Born: Melitta Rene Klein; 17 January 1904; Ružomberok, Austria-Hungary
- Died: 10 February 1983 (aged 79); London, England
- Education: Berlin Psychoanalytic Institute; Friedrich-Wilhelms-Universität
- Occupations: Physician; psychoanalyst
- Relatives: Melanie Klein (mother)
- Medical career
- Institutions: British Psychoanalytical Society

Melitta Rene Schmideberg-Klein (née Klein; 17 January 1904 – 10 February 1983) was a Slovak-born British-American physician, psychiatrist and psychoanalyst.

== Biography ==
Schmideberg was born in Ružomberok, Austria-Hungary (now Slovakia) into a Jewish family, the only daughter and eldest child of Arthur Klein and psychoanalyst Melanie Klein (née Reizes). She had a brother, Hans, who was born in 1907. Prior to the First World War, the family moved to Budapest. Following the war, her father moved to Sweden and Melitta and her mother returned to Ružomberok, where Melitta graduated from high school in 1921. She moved to Berlin to study medicine and thus to prepare to become an analyst. She regularly attended events with her mother at the Berlin Psychoanalytic Institute, where she met Austrian psychoanalyst Walter Schmideberg, a friend of Freud, whom she married in 1924.

In 1927, Schmideberg earned her M.D. from Friedrich-Wilhelms-Universität in Berlin. That same year, her mother moved to London. Scmideberg, who by then had a Swedish passport, followed in 1928 to work on a thesis, living with her mother and traveling back and forth until her husband joined her in London in 1932. She began analytic training with Max Eitingon and Karen Horney in 1929, where she also underwent analysis with Hanns Sachs, and became an associate member of the Society in 1931. She was elected an associate member of the British Psychoanalytical Society in 1932, becoming a full member in 1933.

She began analysis with Edward Glover in 1933 or 1934 and stated that she did so in order to individuate herself from her mother. Schmideberg also believed her mother's grief in response to her brother Hans' death in a 1934 climbing accident—Klein was reportedly "too distraught to go to her son's funeral"—was inadequate, another source of resentment; she blamed Klein for what she believed was Hans' suicide.

Schmideberg and Glover became vocal opponents of her mother. During the controversial discussions, she compared her mother and the Kleinians to Goebbels, alleging that they relied on slogans instead of "scientific standards."

She resigned from the Society in 1944 to concentrate on her work with juvenile delinquency. She moved to New York City in 1945 and helped found the Association for the Psychiatric Treatment of Offenders (APTO) in New York. She became a U.S. citizen in 1959, when she was living at 444 Central Park West.

After her mother's death in 1960, she returned to London, where she died in 1983. She is sometimes seen as an extreme example of the bitterness that can be instilled by having an analytic parent.

== Career ==
From 1933 to 1945, she worked for Glover's Institute for the Scientific Treatment of Delinquency.

In New York, Schmideberg treated offenders privately and for free, but after she had to turn down a desperate mother seeking help for a son who would soon be re-entering society, she and Jack Sokol organized APTO as a referral network in 1950, building an organization with a volunteer clinical team that treated patients in their private offices. A second element was an education offering for involved professionals; the two also established a public arm of the organization for "enlightened laymen." While they originally planned to name the organization the "institute for Psychotherapy of Criminals and Delinquents," negative reaction, mostly from people claiming to speak on behalf of offenders, led them to choose the more anodyne APTO.

Patient treatment, both group and individual, was free, but APTO also insisted clients have something like wraparound support, which she called "group therapy in reverse": a model to "‘utilize the impact of as many therapeutically oriented persons as possible" through a supportive network of helping professionals and friends, which might include probation officers, social workers, teachers, priests or pastors, employers, family, and other social relationships.

In 1958, Schmidebeg and Sokol launched The APTO Journal, which became the International Journal of Offender Therapy and Comparative Criminology.

== Publications ==
=== Early articles ===
In the 1930s, Schmideberg published a series of articles in the International Journal of Psychoanalysis, on subjects ranging from the asocial child to intellectual inhibitions.

=== Blitz studies ===
During The Blitz, Schmideberg published a set of observations on reactions to the air-raids in London, noting increases in localism, in drinking and (especially in women) sexual desire.

=== Books ===
- Children in Need. Allen and Unwin. 1948.
- Short Analytic Therapy. Child Care Pub. 1950.
- Schmideberg, Melitta (1955). Principles of Treating Borderline Cases.
- Schmideberg, Melitta (1956). Multiple Origins and Functions of Guilt.
- My Experience of Psychotherapy. American Psychological Association. 1974.
- Probation and allied services: criminology in action - Volume 1. International Journal of Offender Therapy. 1971. with Gerhard O. W. Mueller, Irving Barnett.

== See also ==
- Barbara Low (psychoanalyst)
- Kate Friedlander
