= Patrick Casement =

British psychoanalyst and author

Patrick Casement (born 1935) is a British psychoanalyst and author of multiple books and journal articles on contemporary psychoanalytic technique. He has been described as a pioneer in the relational approaches to psychoanalysis and psychotherapy by Andrew Samuels, Professor of Analytical Psychology. His book Learning from Our Mistakes received a Gradiva award for its contribution to psychoanalysis, and his book Learning Along the Way: Further Reflections on Psychoanalysis and Psychotherapy was listed in the top 100 psychotherapy books of all time by BookAuthority.

Casement is best known for his Learning from... series. His works have been translated into 21 languages and utilised by psychoanalysts and professionals from other related disciplines. Burton highlights how Casement identified learning from his patients in the analytic encounter as being of central value in his work as it allows for continuous discovery and understanding.

== Early life and training ==
Casement was born in Woldingham in 1935. He is the second of four children, his father's side being from a Naval background. He was at Cambridge, Trinity College from 1956 to 1959 where he read for a Degree in Anthropology and Theology. After qualifying with a Diploma in Public and Social Administration from Barnett House, Oxford University, Casement went on to work as a social worker and probation officer.

During his time working as a family caseworker and then principal for the London Family Welfare Association, Casement trained and qualified as a psychotherapist with the British Association of Psychotherapists, and in 1977 qualified further as a psychoanalyst with the British Institute of Psychoanalysts. He went on to become a training and supervising analyst for the British Psychoanalytical Society. His supervisors and membership consultants included John Klauber, Adam Limentani, Hanna Segal and Paula Heimann. Casement aligned with what was the Independent Group in the British Psychoanalytical Society, and has been particularly influenced by the work of Donald Winnicott, Wilfred Bion, and Michael Balint.

== Clinical contributions to psychoanalysis ==
Casement's contributions to psychoanalytic technique include his observations about internal supervision, trial identification, and monitoring how the analytic space is either preserved or spoiled by the analyst's contributions.

Casement was deeply influenced by Winnicott's ideas including 'The Use of an Object'. Burton has noted how Winnicott's emphasis on the dynamic of the patient-analyst exchange became a central focus of Casement's work. In developing his ideas and guiding his clinical work, Casement has noted a potential for patients to be steered by unconscious hope, searching for what may have previously remained unmet through and in the analytic process. Casement places an emphasis on the analyst's affective openness, and within this a willingness and capacity to consider and explore his/her own contributions to, and impact on, the analytic process. In his book ‘On Learning from the Patient’, Casement references Winnicott's metaphor of the spatula as a guiding influence on this aspect of his clinical approach, in which a protective space is cultivated for the patient to ‘play’, within which, the patient's process can unfold with minimal impingement from the analyst.

Casement has written about a risk of applying psychoanalytic theory too confidently or of analytic sureness/certainty. Casement has also cautioned against preconceptions that steer the analytic process, and has advocated a need for analysts to be led by the process emerging between analyst and patient in the consulting room. In this respect, Casement states that there is a need for the analyst to regularly monitor the analytic space for possible impingements that the analyst may bring to, or impose on, the therapeutic relationship. It is within this regard, that Casement has outlined the therapeutic utility of his concepts of internal supervision and trial identification.

In 2019, Casement published ‘Learning Along the Way', which is a collection of his previously published papers and other writings from the past fifty years. He also has a mini book in process with Aeon Books Ltd, Credo? Religion and Psychoanalysis.

== Personal life ==
Casement is married since 1966 and has two daughters. He retired from private practice in 2005, but still works as a supervisor to a number of analysts, psychologists and therapists.

== Bibliography ==
=== Books ===
- Casement, P. (1985). On Learning from the Patient. Tavistock Publications, London.
  - Classic Edition: Casement, P. (2014). On Learning from the Patient, London and New York, with Routledge.
- Casement, P. (1990). Further learning from the patient. London, Routledge.
- Casement, P. (1991) Learning from the Patient. Collects first two books.
- Casement, P. (2002). Learning from Our Mistakes: Beyond Dogma in Psychoanalysis and Psychotherapy. London, Brunner-Routledge.
- Casement, P. (2006). Learning from Life: becoming a psychoanalyst. London, Routledge.
- Casement, P. (2018). Growing Up?: A Journey with Laughter. London, Karnac Books.
- Casement, P. (2019). Learning Along the Way: Further Reflections on Psychoanalysis and Psychotherapy. London, Routledge.
- Casement, P. (2020). Credo? Religion and Psychoanalysis. London, Aeon Books.

=== Secondary Literature ===
- Samuels, A. In Casement, P. (2019) Learning Along the Way: Further Reflections on Psychoanalysis and Psychotherapy. East Sussex and New York, Routledge.
