= Sylvia Payne =

British pioneer of psychoanalysis

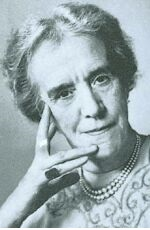
Sylvia May Payne

Sylvia May Payne CBE (née Moore; 6 November 1880 – 30 May 1976) was one of the pioneers of psychoanalysis in the United Kingdom.

== Early life ==
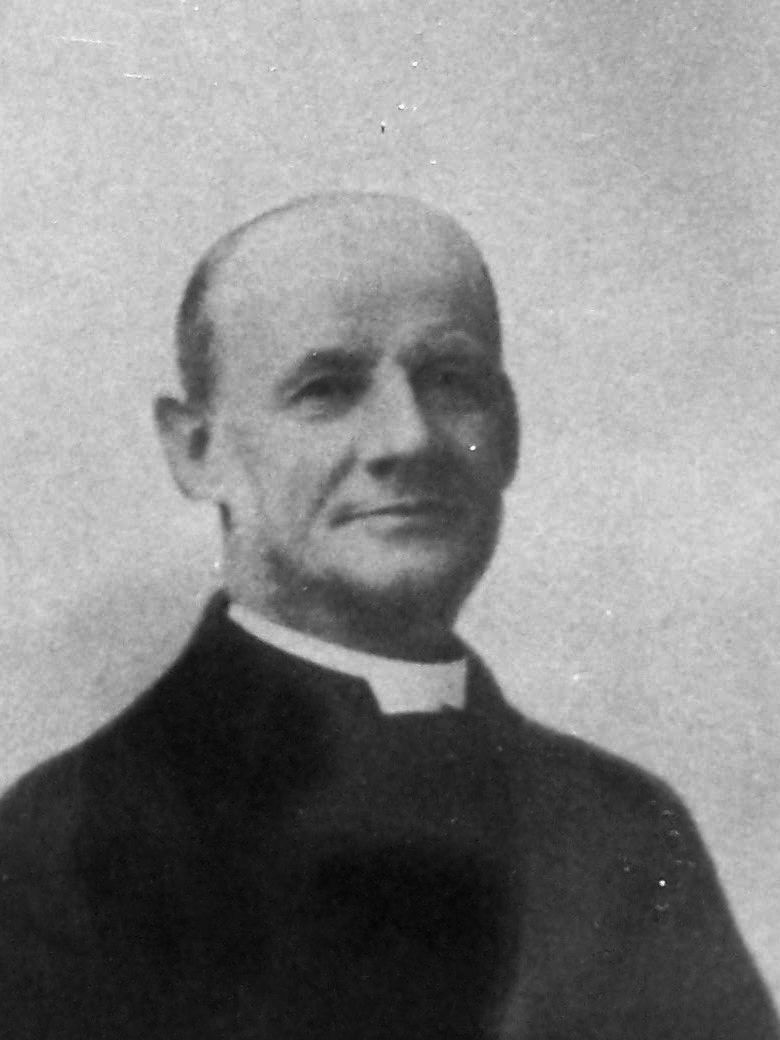
Payne's father, Edward William Moore

Born as Sylvia May Moore in Marylebone, London, the daughter of Rev. Edward William Moore and his wife Letitia. Her father was incumbent of Brunswick Chapel and an adherent of the Higher Life movement, being one of the founders of the Keswick Convention. The family later lived at Wimbledon. Moore was educated at Wimbledon High School, Westfield College (University of London) and the London School of Medicine for Women – later the Royal Free Hospital. She qualified in 1906 and held house appointments at the Royal Free Hospital until her marriage in 1908.

During the First World War, Payne became commandant and medical officer in Torquay at the Red Cross Hospital for wounded soldiers. In the 1918 Birthday Honours, she was made a Commander of the Order of the British Empire for her work.

== Psychoanalytic career ==
Payne developed an interest in psychoanalysis during the war and began training with Edward Glover at the Medico-Psychological Clinic on Brunswick Square, London. She went to Berlin, where she underwent analysis with Hans Sachs and got to know Karl Abraham. In 1922, Payne became an Associate Member of the British Psychoanalytical Society. In 1926 she became a psychiatrist at Ernest Jones' London Clinic of Psychoanalysis (later the Institute of Psychoanalysis) and a member of the society. Payne was strong advocate for psychoanalysis and a prolific writer on psychoanalysis and women. Jones put her in charge of administration at the society, where she was very effective. In 1929 she was joint secretary with Joan Riviere in the International Congress in Oxford. Payne was the analyst for Marion Milner and Charles Rycroft, among others.

Between 1941 and 1945, she played an important part in the controversial discussions as one of the moderators between Melanie Klein and Anna Freud. She organised a stenographer to record the discussion accurately, so members who could not get to London because of war work could be kept in touch. At the same time, there was a constitutional debate within the society centring on Edward Glover. The result was that Glover resigned from the society and Anna Freud resigned from the training committee.

In 1944 Payne was elected as president of the society, with Ernest Jones as honorary president. Payne was in charge of discussions on training, with an ad hoc committee including John Bowlby, Anna Freud, Willi Hoffer, Melanie Klein, Susan Isaacs, Adrian Stephen and John Rickman.; and as 'three separately angled trainings arose' emerged as a leading member of the Independent Group. She ceased to be president in 1947 but was president of the BPAS again from 1954 to 1956. In 1962, she was elected an honorary member of the BPAS. She was also a Fellow of the British Psychological Society.

== Personal life ==
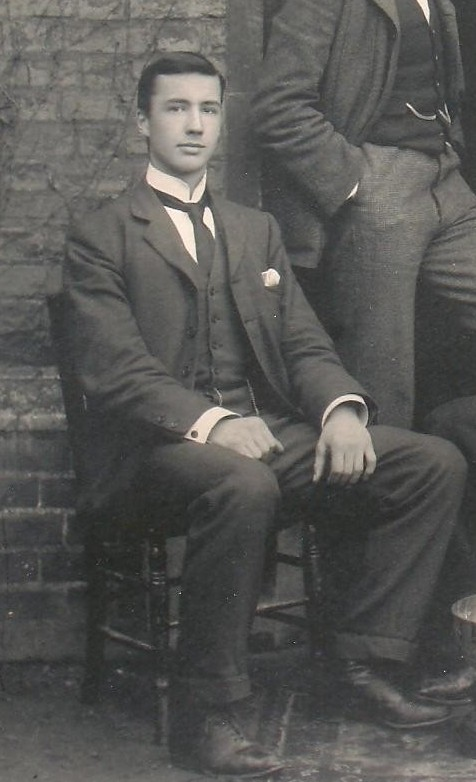
John Ernest Payne

In 1908 she married John Ernest Payne, a surgeon who had rowed for Cambridge in the Boat Race in 1899 and 1900, and stroked the winning Leander Club four in the Stewards' Challenge Cup at Henley Royal Regatta in 1900. One son Kenneth Payne became an Olympic rower, and another Anthony Monck-Mason Payne became a professor of medicine at Yale University and an Assistant Director of WHO. Her brother, Henry Monck-Mason Moore, was Governor General of Ceylon.

== Death ==
Sylvia Payne lived in retirement in Tunbridge Wells, where she died at the age of 95.

== Publications ==
- A Conception of Femininity, 1935
- Some Observations on Ego Development of the Fetishist, 1939
