= Marion Milner =

British writer and psychoanalyst (1900–1998)

- Born: Nina Marion Blackett; 1 February 1900; London, England
- Died: 29 May 1998 (aged 98); London, England
- Spouse: Dennis Milner (m. 1927)
- Children: 1
- Writing career
- Pen name: Joanna Field
- Subjects: Psychoanalysis; Industrial psychology

Marion Milner (1 February 1900 – 29 May 1998), sometimes known as Marion Blackett-Milner, was a British psychoanalyst, writer, and artist. Outside psychotherapeutic circles, she is better known by her pseudonym, Joanna Field, as a pioneer of introspective journaling.

== Biography ==
Milner was born in Kensington, London, as Nina Marion Blackett, the daughter of Arthur Stuart Blackett, a stockbroker, and his wife, Caroline Frances Maynard, who was the sister of Nobel physicist Patrick Blackett. She studied at University College, London, where she graduated with a first-class degree in psychology in 1923.

In 1926, Milner began an introspective journey that later became one of her best-known books, A Life of One's Own (initially published under the name Joanna Field in 1934). This started as a journal in which she would note times that she felt happy and thoughts going through her head at those times, in an attempt to discover what happiness was; however, her introspection branched out into other areas, from an analysis of day-to-day worries to experiences which some reviewers described as "mystical". Milner's basic technique is a kind of introspection, observing fleeting thoughts ("butterfly thoughts", as she calls them) combined with an openness to sensory experience that she calls "wide awareness". A Life of One's Own was well-received, attracting favorable reviews from such literary notables as W. H. Auden and Stephen Spender, and soon afterwards, she published a work on similar lines (again as Joanna Field), An Experiment in Leisure.

During this period, Milner became increasingly interested in Jean Piaget and the work of Jungian analytical psychologists. Here she was particularly interested in what she originally termed "bisexuality", but would now perhaps be better called psychological androgyny, and also investigated Eastern philosophies such as Taoism. In 1940, she started training as a psychoanalyst undergoing analysis with Sylvia Payne, and training with Joan Riviere and Ella Sharpe.

She began practicing psychoanalysis in 1943, and became a prominent member of the Independent Group. Her best-known work on psychoanalysis, The Hands of the Living God, relates her own lengthy treatment of a psychotic patient and the insights she gained into her own mind. She made considerable use of painting and doodling in her therapy and was also an enthusiastic painter herself; her observations on the benefits of painting were published as On Not Being Able to Paint.

== Personal life ==
Milner married Dennis Milner in 1927; they had one son named John. Dennis died in 1954. Milner died in London on 29 May 1998, aged 98.

== Publications ==
- A Life of One's Own 1934
- An Experiment in Leisure 1937
- The Human Problem in Schools 1938
- On Not Being Able to Paint 1950
- The Hands of the Living God 1969
- Eternitys Sunrise 1987
- The Suppressed Madness of Sane Men: Forty-Four Years of Exploring Psychoanalysis 1987
- Eternity's Sunrise. A Way of Keeping a Diary 1987
- Bothered by Alligators 2012

== Reception ==
Writer Akshi Singh’s 2025 book In Defence of Leisure elaborates Milner’s arguments, arguing that for a full life one needs to make time for leisure.

== See also ==
- Writing therapy
- List of books on diaries and journals
