= Good enough parent =

Psychosociology concept

Good enough parent is a concept deriving from the work of Donald Winnicott, in his efforts to provide support for what he called "the sound instincts of normal parents...stable and healthy families".

An extension of his championship of the "ordinary good mother...the devoted mother", the idea of the good enough parent was designed on the one hand to defend the ordinary mother and father against what Winnicott saw as the growing threat of intrusion into the family from professional expertise; and on the other to offset the dangers of idealisation built into Kleinian articulations of the 'good object' and 'good mother', by stressing instead the actual nurturing environment provided by the parents for the child.

== Disillusionment ==
A key function of good enough parenting is to provide the essential background to allow for the growing child's disillusionment with the parents and the world, without destroying their appetite for life and ability to accept (external and internal) reality. By surviving the child's anger and frustration with the necessary disillusionments of life, the good enough parents would enable their child to relate to them on an ongoing and more realistic basis. As Winnicott put it, it is "the good-enough environmental provision" which makes it possible for the offspring to "cope with the immense shock of loss of omnipotence". Failing such provision, family interactions may be based on a fantasy bond, in a retreat from genuine relating that fosters the false self and undercuts the ongoing ability to use the parents to foster continuing emotional growth offered by the good enough parents.

== See also ==
- Attachment theory
- Family estrangement
- Idealization and devaluation
- Middle Group
- Object relations theory
- Transitional object
