= Ella Freeman Sharpe =

- Born: 22 February 1875; Haverhill, Suffolk, England
- Died: 1 June 1947; London, England

Ella Freeman Sharpe (1875–1947) was a leading figure in the early development of psychoanalysis in Britain, and was among the most influential of the first British training analysts.

== Life ==
Sharpe taught at the Hucknall Pupil Teachers Training College 1904–16, before moving to London to undertake analysis with Edward Glover's brother James. In 1923, she became a member of the British Psycho-Analytical Society and had a second analysis, postwar, with Hanns Sachs.

In the twenties Sharpe, like most of the London analysts, supported the more experienced work of Melanie Klein against the newcomer Anna Freud, and she continued to show Kleinian influence into the early thirties. By the time of the controversial discussions, however, Sharpe had taken a more nuanced attitude to Kleinianism, which saw her increasingly aligned with the Middle Group of British psychoanalysts, seeing Kleinianism as marred by a tendency to concrete embodiment.

== The symbolic in sublimation ==
Sharpe argued in her papers on sublimation for a continuous thread between compulsive symptoms indicating penance, and creative sublimations of childhood sadism. Investigating female patients who used artistic performance as a form of identification with the phallus, she also pointed out the problematic aspects of that incorporation in phantasy.

Her attention to the role of symbolism in life and psychoanalysis has made her appear as a precursor of Jacques Lacan, who would himself pay tribute in Ecrits to "Ella Sharpe and her very relevant remarks...She is far from ordinary in the extent to which she requires the analyst to be familiar with all branches of human knowledge". Nevertheless, her sense of the concrete, the body and the material behind sublimation and the symbolic differentiates her from the more linguistic elements of the Lacanian turn.

Sharpe drew attention to the similarities between poetic devices, like synecdoche, and Freud's views on the relations of parts, in the manifest content of dreams, and the whole, in the latent content of dreams.

== Selected writings ==
- Sharpe published in 1937 a sequel to Freud on dreams, called Dream Analysis: A Practical Handbook for Psycho-Analysts. It has been praised as a bridge between Freud and Lacan, as well as for setting out Sharpe's own view of the psyche as dream-matrix.
- She also published a psychoanalytical study of Francis Thompson, highlighting his identification with, and fear of separation from, his mother.
- Among her papers in the International Journal of Psychoanalysis were 'Certain Aspects of Sublimation and Delusion' (1930), and on 'The Technique of Psychoanalysis' (1930/31).

== See also ==
- Charles Rycroft
- Joan Riviere
- Nina Searl
