= Controversial discussions =

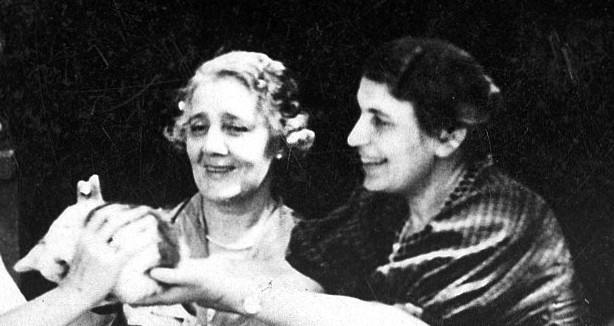
Portrait of Melanie Klein and Anna Freud

The controversial discussions were a protracted series of meetings of the British Psychoanalytical Society which took place between October 1942 and February 1944 between the Viennese school and the supporters of Melanie Klein. They led to a tripartite division of training in the society after the war with the three groups of the Kleinians, the Anna Freudians, and the Middle (or later Independent) Group.

In these sessions the differences between classical Freudian analysis and newer Kleinian theory were argued with considerable vehemence. The Freudian side was principally represented by Anna Freud, who was resistant to the revisions of theory and method proposed by Klein as a result of her work as an analyst of young children. The Klein Group included Susan Isaacs, Joan Riviere, Paula Heimann, and Roger Money-Kyrle. The Anna Freud Group included Kate Friedlander, and Willie Hoffer. The "Middle Group", who tried to apply a moderating force included Ella Freeman Sharpe, James Strachey, Sylvia Payne, Donald Winnicott, William Gillespie, Marjorie Brierley, and later, Michael Balint.

In the agreement, eventually formalised in November 1946, two parallel training courses were established, one for candidates aligned to the Anna Freud school and one incorporating training from Freudian and Kleinian analysts as well as from the non-aligned analysts from the Middle or Independent Group. On this basis the agreement specified that:

- There should be one Training Committee responsible for all matters regarding the selection, training, and qualification of students.
- Students could opt to take either course.
- Lectures and seminars other than those on technique would be common to all students.
- Students would attend clinical and technical seminars taken by analysts of their own course or group. They could attend as guests those taken by members of the other course.
- The first Supervisor must be from the student's own group, the second drawn from the non-aligned Middle Group.
- In the third year all students would attend clinical seminars run by teachers from both courses.

It was agreed further that all the key policy making committees of the BPS should have representatives from the three groups.

== See also ==
- Barbara Low
- Pearl King
- Training analysis
