= Betty Joseph =

British psychoanalyst

- Born: 7 March 1917; Edgbaston, Birmingham, UK
- Died: 4 April 2013; St John's Wood, London, UK
- Education: Wolverhampton Girls' High School, Birmingham University, London School of Economics
- Known for: Follower of Melanie Klein, Meta-analysis in psychoanalysis
- Awards: Sigourney Award (1995)

Betty Joseph (7 March 1917 – 4 April 2013), was a British psychoanalyst and writer, and a follower of the work of Melanie Klein. According to her obituary in The Daily Telegraph, she "was widely considered to be one of the great psychoanalysts of her day".

== Biography ==
Betty Joseph was born on 7 March 1917, at 403 Gillott Road, Edgbaston, Birmingham, the daughter of Henry Joseph (1879–1941), an electrical engineer, and his wife, Nennie May Joseph, née Rudelsheim (1883–1966). Both of her parents were from Anglo-Jewish families that had come to the UK from Alsace in the early eighteenth century.

She was educated at Wolverhampton Girls' High School, followed by training in social work at Birmingham University, and the London School of Economics.

During the Second World War, Joseph worked in civil defence, and was a lorry driver at one point, and worked with often traumatised child evacuees. She went into analysis with Michael Balint, and later with Paula Heimann.

Joseph was known for her meta-analysis, the analysis of the process of psychoanalysis itself, and for taking an empirical, scientific approach to the subject. Joseph thought that it was important for the analyst to focus on what the patient was doing during analysis sessions, not just what they were saying, in trying to get at the underlying "psychic reality".

Joseph was the chairman of the Melanie Klein Trust from 1991 to 2006.

She never married.

Joseph died on 4 April 2013 from heart disease, at her home in Clifton Hill, St John's Wood, London.

== Selected publications ==
In 1989, she published Psychic Equilibrium and Psychic Change, a selection of her papers.

== Awards and honours ==
In 1995, Joseph received the Sigourney Award.
