= British Psychoanalytical Society =

Organisation in Britain

- Predecessor: London Psychoanalytical Society
- Formation: 1913
- Founder: Ernest Jones
- Merger of: Institute of Psychoanalysis
- Location: London
- Leader: Elizabeth Coats Thümmel (President)
- Website: http://psychoanalysis.org.uk/

The British Psychoanalytical Society was founded by Ernest Jones as the London Psychoanalytical Society on 30 October 1913. It is one of several organisations in Britain training psychoanalysts.

The society has been home to a number of psychoanalysts, including Wilfred Bion, Donald Winnicott, Anna Freud and Melanie Klein. Today it has over 400 members and is a member organisation of the International Psychoanalytical Association.

== Establishment and name ==
Psychoanalysis was founded by Sigmund Freud, and much of the early work on Psychoanalysis was carried out in Freud's home city of Vienna and in central Europe. However, in the early 1900s Freud began to spread his theories throughout the English speaking world. Around this time, he established a relationship with Ernest Jones, a British neurosurgeon who had read his work in German and met Freud at the inaugural Psychoanalytical Congress in Salzburg. Jones went on to take up a teaching post at the University of Toronto, in which capacity he established the American Psychoanalytic Association.

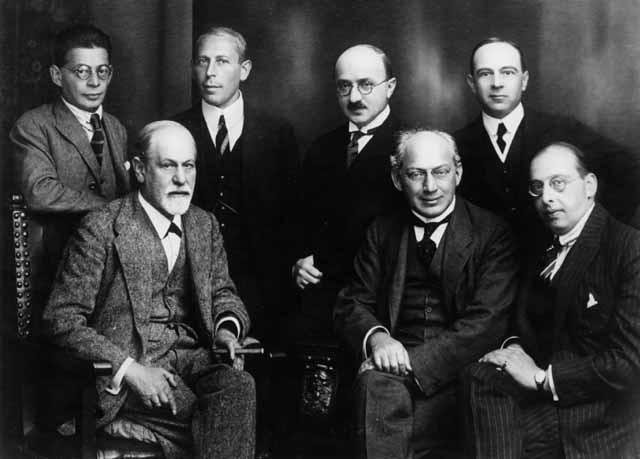
Freud and the members of the Inner Circle, including Ernest Jones.

When Jones returned to London, he established the society in 1913, as the London Psychoanalytical Society. The society had 9 founding members including William Mackenzie, Maurice Nicoll and David Eder. Almost immediately, the society was caught up in the international controversy between Carl Jung and Sigmund Freud. Many of the society's membership were followers of Jung's theories, although Jones himself enjoyed a close relationship with Freud and wished for the society to be unambiguously Freudian. Jones had joined Freud's Inner circle in 1912, and helped to oust Jung from the International Psychoanalytical Association.

However, the outbreak of World War One in 1914 meant that the nascent society, which depended heavily on correspondence with psychoanalysts in Vienna, then part of Austria-Hungary, had to be suspended. There were a few informal meetings during the war, but these became less and less frequent as the war went on.

In 1919, Ernest Jones re-founded the society as the British Psychoanalytical Society, and served as its president. He took the opportunity to define the society as Freudian in nature, and removed most of the Jungian members. With the help of John Rickman, the society established a clinic and a training arm, known as the Institute of Psychoanalysis.

== Interwar years ==
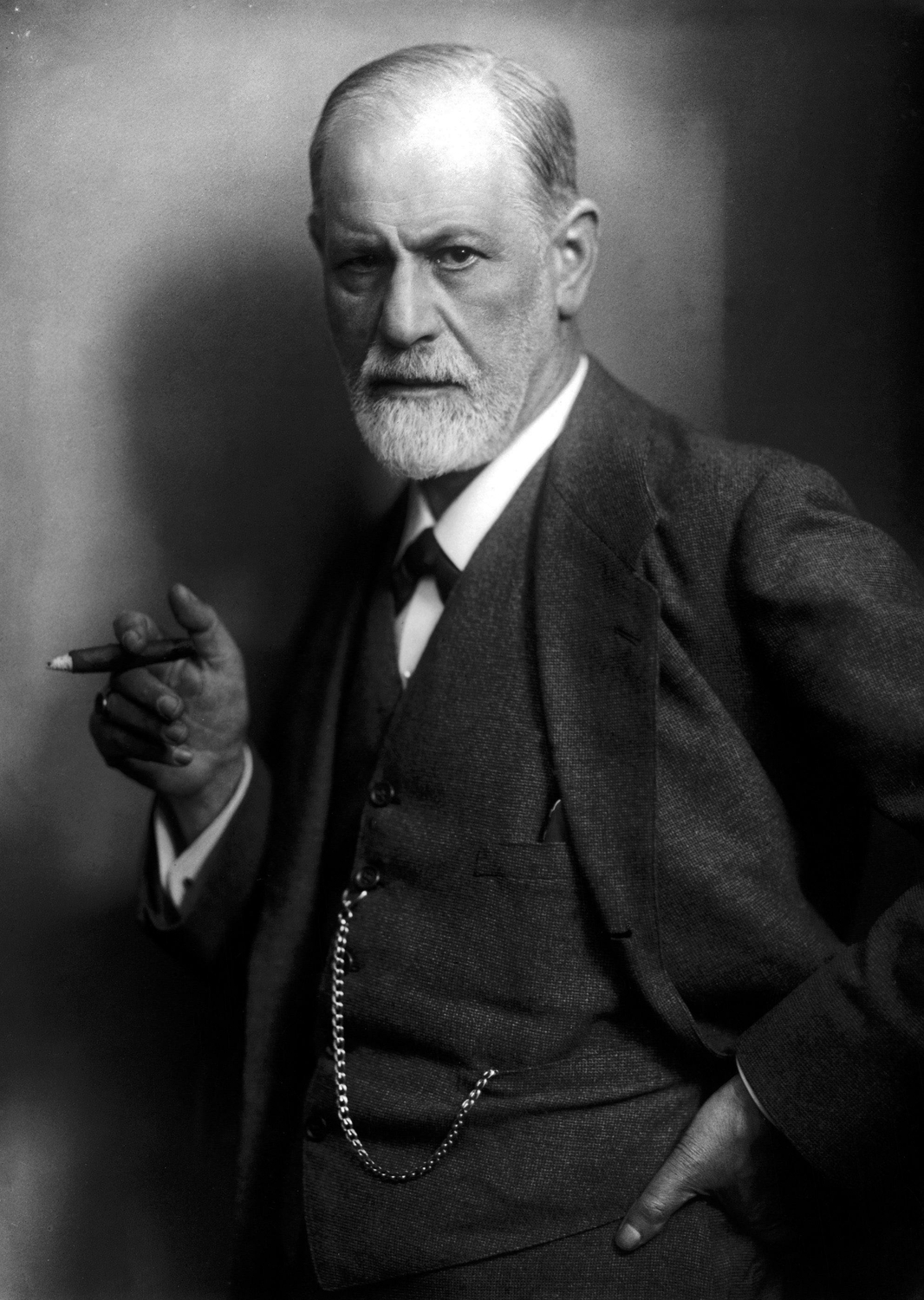
Sigmund Freud fled Austria in 1938, settling in Hampstead, London. He never formally joined the society, but his close friendship with Ernest Jones, and the sudden influx of continental analysts due to the rise of the Nazi Party, meant that the status of the society was greatly enhanced during the Interwar period.

In the 1920s, Ernest Jones and the society grew increasingly under the influence of Melanie Klein. Jones was inspired by her writings to develop several of his own psychoanalytical concepts. In 1925, Klein delivered a series of talks at the society on her theories. Klein's work was well received in London, but it attracted increasing controversy on the continent, where the majority of psychoanalysts were still based. Realising that her ideas were not warmly received at the Berlin Psychoanalytic Institute, where Klein was based, Jones invited her to move to London, which she did later in 1925.

The rise of the Nazi Party in Germany and later in Austria, led to increasing numbers of German and Austrian Psychoanalysts fleeing to London, where they joined the burgeoning society. By 1937, 13 out of 71 members were refugees from Europe. Ernest Jones personally intervened to bring Sigmund Freud and his daughter, Anna Freud, to London. In 1938, Sigmund Freud wrote to Jones:

"The events of recent years have made London the principal site and center of the psychoanalytical movement. May the society carry out the functions thus falling to it in the most brilliant manner."

By the start of the second world war, 34 out of 90 members were emigres from the continent. Among them were:

Analyst	Previous membership	First year of BPAS membership	Year of leaving
Anna Freud	Vienna Psychoanalytical Society	1938	Remained a member until death.
Dorothy Burlingham	Vienna Psychoanalytical Society	1938	Remained a member until death.
Erwin Stengel	Vienna Psychoanalytical Society	1938	Remained a member until death.
Eduard Hitschmann	Vienna Psychoanalytical Society	1938	1940 – For Harvard Medical School
Otto Isakower	Vienna Psychoanalytical Society	1938	1940 – Emigrated to New York City
Grete L. Bibring	Vienna Psychoanalytical Society	1938	1941 – For Tufts University
Ernst Kris	Vienna Psychoanalytical Society	1938	1940 – Emigrated to New York City
Kate Friedlander	Berlin Psychoanalytic Institute	1933	Remained a member until death.
Paula Heimann	Berlin Psychoanalytic Institute	1938	Remained a member until death.
Michael Balint	Hungarian Psychoanalytic Society	1945 (though he moved to the UK with the help of Ernest Jones in 1938)	Remained a member until death.
Melitta Schmideberg	Berlin Psychoanalytic Institute	1933	1944 – Resigned due to outcome of the Controversial discussions.
Eva Rosenfeld	Vienna Psychoanalytical Society	1936	Remained a member until death.

However, the assimilation of so many prominent Psychoanalysts from continental Europe created tensions. The huge difference in the approaches of Anna Freud and Melanie Klein led to the development of several factions. Increasingly, presentations of papers at the society became thinly veiled attacks on opposing factions theories. For example, in March 1937 Melitta Schmideberg (Klein's daughter) presented her paper: "After the Analysis – Some Phantasies of Patients", which viciously attacked almost all of Klein's ideas, though it did not mention her by name.

The views of the different Psychoanalysts: Kleinian, Freudian, and those who were not affiliated with either, led to increasing dysfunction, and things became so bad that a specific committee had to be established to deal with the problem.

== The 'controversial discussions' ==
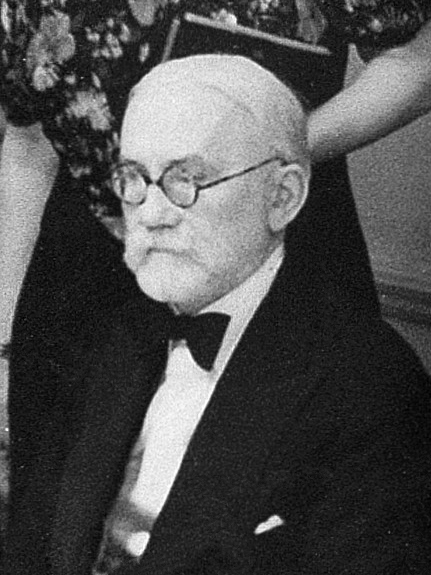
James Strachey, one of the leaders of the scientific committee

By 1942, relations between the factions within the society had become so heated that a committee had to be convened to facilitate monthly discussions on the scientific nature of the society. The committee was chaired by three members of the society, each representing one of the major factions:

- James Strachey – a member of the British Independent Group.
- Marjorie Brierley – an ally of Melanie Klein.
- Edward Glover – who identified as 'pure Freudian', in opposition to Melanie Klein. Glover resigned from the society in 1944, along with several other Freudian psychoanalysts.

After heated debate, the committee resolved to a "gentleman's agreement" – which ensured that each faction would have equal representation within all committees within the society. It was also agreed that training of future psychoanalysts at the institute would be organised into two pathways: one Kleinian, and one Freudian.

== After World War Two ==
With the resolution of the controversial discussions, the society became dominated by independent psychoanalysts such as Donald Winnicott, Michael Balint or Wilfred Bion.

== Prominent members of the society and Institute ==
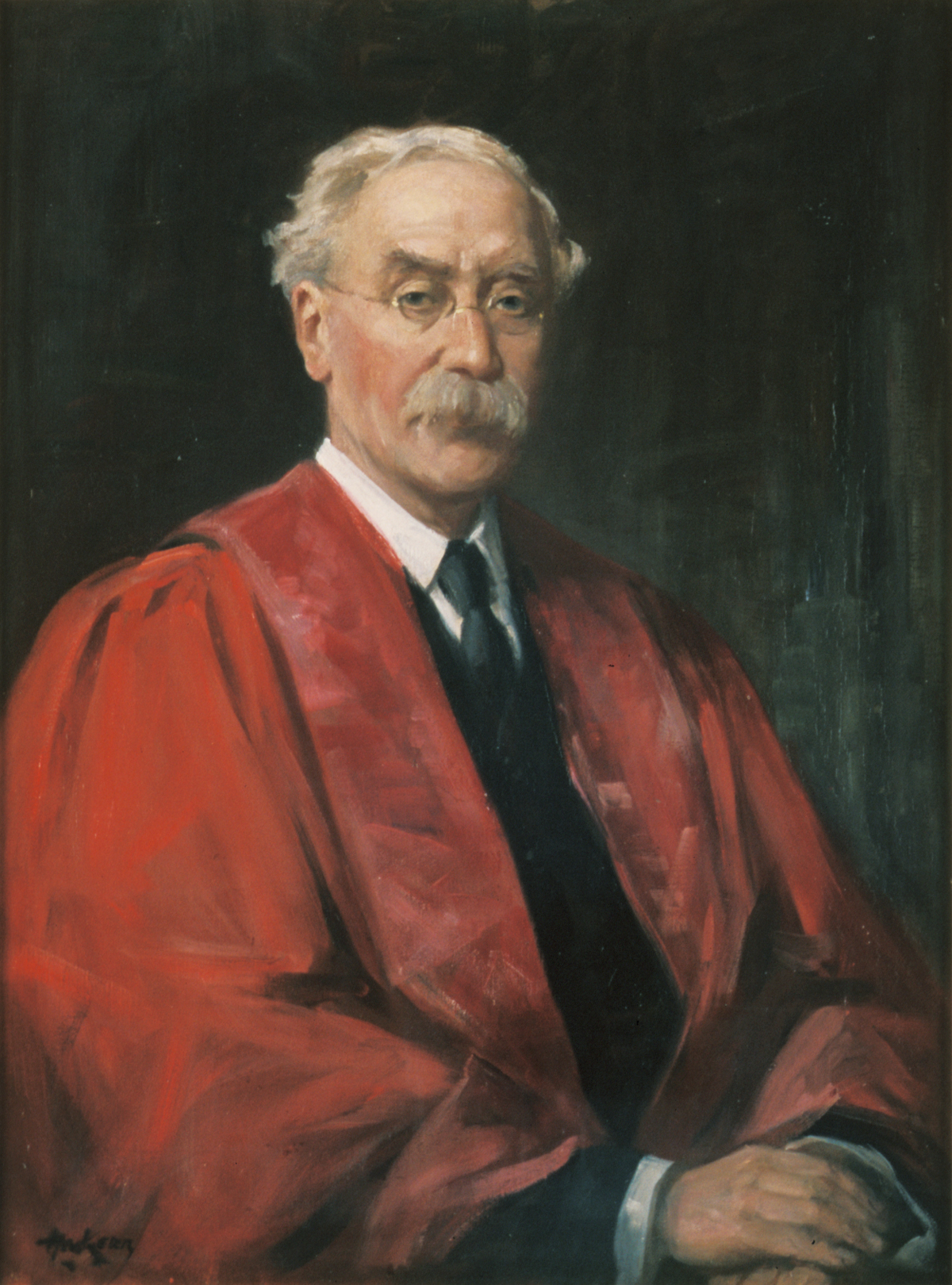
William Leslie Mackenzie, a founding member of the Society.

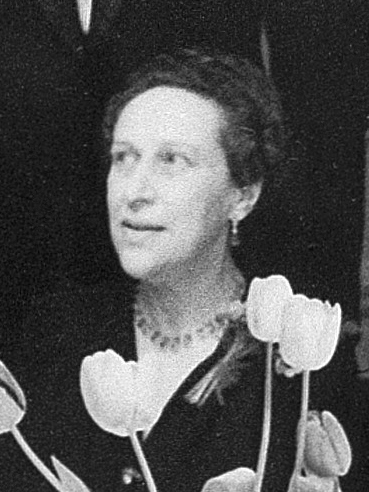
Paula Heimann

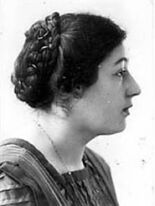
Eva Rosenfeld

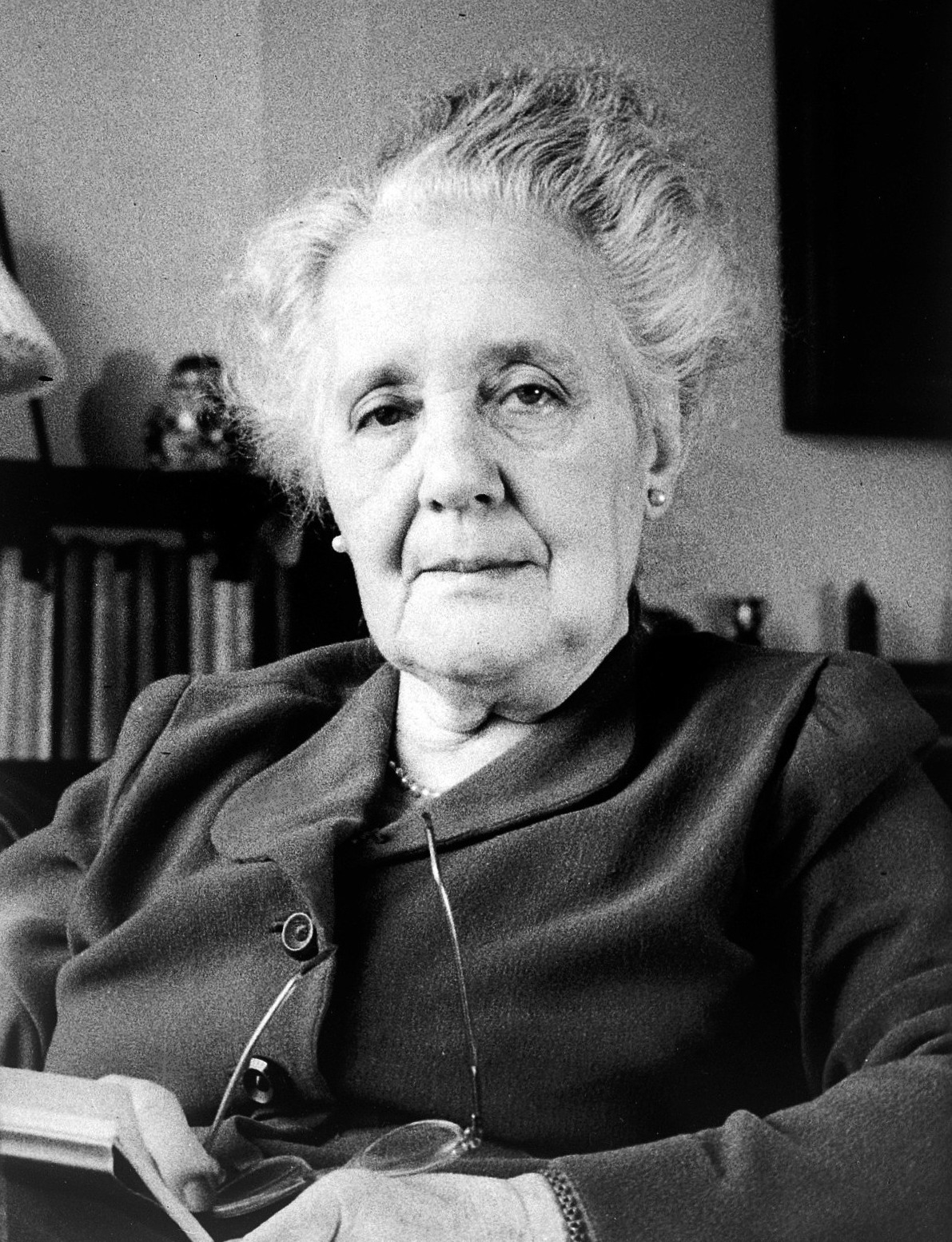
Melanie Klein

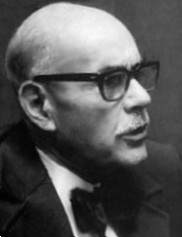
Wilfred Bion

Prominent members of the Society include:

- Michael Balint
- Wilfred Bion – A member from 1950.
- Marjorie Brierley – A member from 1930 until her death.
- David Eder
- Rose Edgcumbe
- Ronald Fairbairn
- Anna Freud
- André Green
- Stephen Grosz
- Betty Joseph
- Melanie Klein – A member for over 30 years.
- William Leslie Mackenzie
- Tom Main
- Donald Meltzer – A member from the mid-1950s to the early 1980s
- Maurice Nicoll
- Lionel Penrose
- Rosine Perelberg
- John Rickman
- Joan Riviere
- Charles Rycroft
- Ella Sharpe – Became a member in 1921.
- Donald Winnicott – President of the society twice: 1954–56 and 1963–65.

== The society today ==
Through its related bodies, the Institute of Psychoanalysis and the London Clinic of Psychoanalysis, it is involved in the teaching, development, and practice of psychoanalysis at its headquarters at Byron House, west London. It is a constituent organisation of the International Psychoanalytical Association and a member institution of the British Psychoanalytic Council.
