= Pearl King =

British psychoanalyst

Pearl Helen Mellows King (17 June 1918 - 13 January 2015) was a British psychoanalyst.

In 2005, Pearl and her long-term partner, the Canadian artist Elizabeth "Tina" Carlile, the granddaughter of Wilson Carlile, founder of the Church Army, entered into a civil partnership, having met just after World War II.

== See also ==
- Controversial discussions
