= Marjorie Brierley =

Marjorie Flowers Brierley (24 March 1893 – 21 April 1984) was a pioneer of psychoanalysis in Britain, and helped chair the controversial discussions of 1942 which shaped the subsequent history of the British Psychoanalytical Society.

== Biography ==
Marjorie Flowers Ellis was born in London Borough of Lewisham. She completed a 1st class honours degree in psychology at the University College London in 1921, and went on to obtain medical qualifications in 1928. She married William Broadhurst Brierley in 1922.

She died in London in 1984.

== Training and contributions ==
Brierley began her affiliation with the British Psychoanalytical Society in 1927. She went through a double training analysis of four years from 1927 onwards. She became a Full Member of the British Psychoanalytical Society in 1930 and a Training and Supervising Analyst in 1933. She retired from practice in 1944.

Significant among the eleven papers Brierley published between 1932 and 1947, were her contributions on female gender and early development, and on the nature of the affect. Her proposal of a "temporary armistice" in the heated debates of the wartime Society was significant in paving the way for their ultimate resolution.

== Selected writings ==
- 'Specific Determinants in Feminine Development', International Journal of Psychoanalysis XVII (1936)
- 'Affects in Theory and Practice' XVIII (1937)
- 'A Prefatory Note on Internalized Objects and Depression' XX (1939)
- Trends in Psycho-Analysis (1951)

== See also ==
- Barbara Low
- Ernest Jones
- Melanie Klein
