= Rosine Perelberg =

British psychoanalyst

Academic background
- Thesis: Family and Mental Illness in a London Borough (1983)

Rosine Jozef Perelberg is a Brazilian-born British psychoanalyst. She served as president of the British Psychoanalytical Society between 2019 and 2022. Perelberg won The Sigourney Award in 2023, awarded to recognise outstanding work that advances psychoanalytic thought worldwide.

== Career ==
Perelberg completed her master's degree in 1980 at Universidade Federal do Rio de Janeiro, and received her PhD in Social Anthropology from the London School of Economics, University of London in 1983. Towards the end of her PhD, Perelberg worked with anorexia nervosa patients at Maudsley Hospital, before moving into a role as Senior Psychotherapist and Family Therapist at the Marlborough Family Service, where she worked between 1981 and 1991. For 18 years, between 1997 and 2016, Perelberg was the coordinator of the Freud Seminars as part of the MSc in Psychoanalytic Theory at University College London (UCL), as well as those on Sexuality. Perelberg has been a visiting professor at UCL since 2008. Between 2011 and 2012, she was also a visiting fellow at Birkbeck, University of London.

Perelberg served as president of the British Psychoanalytical Society between 2019 and 2022, and is also a fellow of the society.

Perelberg is known for her work on unconscious phantasy, and the treatment of violent patients. She has also discussed excess trauma and helplessness in treatment of patients. In the BBC news she has discussed slip-ups in language and what they reveal about a person. She has also been quoted by The Guardian in stories about overcoming hypochondria and nervousness about singing in public.

== Works ==
- Perelberg, R. J. (2020), Sexuality Excess and Representations. London: Routledge and The New Library of Psychoanalysis, ISBN 9780367253554
- Perelberg, R. J. and Kohon, G. (2017), The Greening of Psychoanalysis: Andre Green New Paradigm in Contemporary Theory and Practice. London: Karnac, ISBN 9781782205623
- Perelberg, R. J. (2016), Psychic Bisexuality: A British French Dialogue. London: Routledge and The New Library of Psychoanalysis, ISBN 9781138579033
- Perelberg, R. J. (2015), Murdered Father, Dead Father: Revisiting the Oedipus Complex. London: Routledge and The New Library of Psychoanalysis, ISBN 9781138841840
- Perelberg, R. J., preface by Green, A. (2008), Time, Space and Phantasy. London: Routledge and The New Library of Psychoanalysis, ISBN 9780415463225
- (Eds) Raphael-Leff, J. and Perelberg, R. J. (2008), Female Experience: Four Generations of British Women Psychoanalysts on Work with Women. London: The Anna Freud Centre, ISBN 9780954931919
- (Ed) Perelberg, R. J. (2007), Time and Memory. London: Karnac, ISBN 9781855754348
- Perelberg, R. J. (2005), Freud: A Modern Reader. London: Whurr (Distributed by Wileys and Sons ltd.), ISBN 9781861564023
- Perelberg, R. J. (2000), Dreaming and Thinking. London: Karnac, ISBN 9781855759787
- Perelberg, R. J. (1999), Psychoanalytic Understanding of Violence and Suicide. London: Routledge and The New Library of Psychoanalysis, ISBN 9780415199322
- (Eds) Perelberg, R. J. and Miller, A. C. (1990) Gender and Power in Families. London: Routledge, ISBN 9781780490656

== Selected publications ==
- Perelberg, R. J. (1995-12-01). "A core phantasy in violence". The International Journal of Psycho-Analysis. 76 (Pt 6): 1215–1231. ISSN 1745-8315. PMID 8789171.
- Perelberg, Rosine Jozef, ed. (1999). Psychoanalytic understanding of violence and suicide. London: Routledge. ISBN 9780203013908.
  - Reviewed in Williams, Paul (2002). "Review". Psychoanalytic Psychotherapy. 16 (2): 177–178. doi:10.1080/14749730210129334a. S2CID 219728762.
- Perelberg, Rosine Jozef (2006). "The Controversial Discussions and après-coup". The International Journal of Psychoanalysis. 87 (5): 1199–1220. doi:10.1516/DF6M-PKN0-7ABT-VLWD. PMID 16997722. S2CID 38208125.
- Psychic bisexuality : a British-French dialogue. Rosine Jozef Perelberg. Abingdon, Oxon. 2018. ISBN 978-1-351-26295-8. OCLC 1006524710.
- Perelberg, Rosine Jozef (2015). Murdered father, dead father : revisiting the Oedipus complex. Abingdon, Oxon. ISBN 978-1-317-52750-3. OCLC 927103500.
  - Reviewed in Aisenstein, Marilia (2017). "Review". International Journal of Psychoanalysis. 98 (4): 1245–1248. doi:10.1111/1745-8315.12552. S2CID 151445543.

== Awards and honours ==
In 2023, Perelberg won the Sigourney Award for her work establishing a creative dialogue between psychoanalysis and social anthropology to address temporality, sexuality and antisemitism. In 1991, Perelberg was the co-recipient of the Sacerdoti Prize at the International Psychoanalytic Association Congress, in Buenos Aires. Her book, Psychic Bisexuality, won the American Board & Academy of Psychoanalysis Book Prize for an edited book in 2019.
