= Erwin Stengel =

Erwin Stengel (25 March 1902 – 2 June 1973) was an Austrian-British neurologist, psychiatrist, and psychoanalyst. Born in Vienna, he studied medicine under Paul Schilder and Julius Wagner-Jauregg there. With the Anschluss of 1938, he emigrated to England with Ernest Jones's assistance. He took up successive positions in Bristol, Edinburgh and Oxford, intermitting with internment on the Isle of Man as an enemy alien, before becoming Reader at the Institute of Psychiatry, London, in 1943, where he conducted pioneering work on attempted suicide. He moved to be Professor of Psychiatry at Sheffield University from 1957 to 1967. Concurrent with his work on suicide, he had a sustained interest in the dementias, pioneering advances in understanding of Alzheimer's disease. Trained as a psychoanalyst, he became an Associate Member of the Vienna Psycho-Analytic Society in 1931 and a Member of the British Psycho-Analytic Society in 1938. He translated Sigmund Freud's Zur Auffassung der Aphasien (1891) into English as On Aphasia. A Critical Study (1953).
