= Donald Winnicott =

English paediatrician and psychoanalyst (1896–1971)

Donald Winnicott FRCP
- Born: Donald Woods Winnicott; 7 April 1896; Plymouth, Devon, England
- Died: 25 January 1971 (aged 74); London, England
- Education: Jesus College, Cambridge; St Bartholomew's Hospital Medical College
- Occupations: Paediatrician; psychiatrist; psychoanalyst
- Known for: Stages of development; holding environment; subjective omnipotence; objective reality; transitional experience; good enough parent; true self and false self
- Spouses: Alice Buxton Winnicott (m. 1923; div. 1949); Clare Nimmo Britton (m. 1951)
- Parent: Elizabeth Martha Woods (mother) Sir John Frederick Winnicott (father)
- Winnicott's voice from the BBC programme Archive on Four, 4 May 2013

Donald Woods Winnicott (7 April 1896 – 25 January 1971) was an English paediatrician and psychoanalyst who was especially influential in the field of object relations theory and developmental psychology. He was a leading member of the British Independent Group of the British Psychoanalytical Society, President of the British Psychoanalytical Society twice (1956–1959 and 1965–1968), and a close associate of British writer and psychoanalyst Marion Milner.

Winnicott is best known for his ideas on the true self and false self, the "good enough" parent, and he and his second wife, Clare, arguably his chief professional collaborator, worked with the notion of the transitional object. He wrote several books, including Playing and Reality, and more than 200 papers.

== Early life and education ==
Winnicott was born on 7 April 1896 in Plymouth, Devon, England, to Sir John Frederick Winnicott and Elizabeth Martha, daughter of chemist and druggist William Woods, of Plymouth. Sir John Winnicott was a partner in the family firm, in business as hardware merchants and manufacturers, and was knighted in 1924, having served twice as mayor of Plymouth; he was also a magistrate and alderman. The Winnicott family were staunch, civic-minded Methodists.

The family was prosperous and ostensibly happy, but behind the veneer, Winnicott saw himself as oppressed by his mother, who tended toward depression, as well as by his two sisters and his nanny. He would eventually speak of 'his own early childhood experience of trying to make "my living" by keeping his mother alive'. His father's influence was that of an enterprising freethinker who encouraged his son's creativity. Winnicott described himself as a disturbed adolescent, reacting against his own self-restraining "goodness" acquired from trying to assuage the dark moods of his mother.

He first thought of studying medicine while at The Leys School, a boarding school in Cambridge, after fracturing his clavicle and recording in his diary that he wished he could treat himself. He began pre-clinical studies in biology, physiology and anatomy at Jesus College, Cambridge, in 1914 but, with the onset of World War I, his studies were interrupted when he was made a medical trainee at the temporary hospital in Cambridge. In 1917, he joined the Royal Navy as a medical officer on the destroyer HMS Lucifer.

Having graduated from Cambridge with a third-class degree, he began studies in clinical medicine at St Bartholomew's Hospital Medical College in London. During this time, he learned from his mentor the art of listening carefully when taking medical histories from patients, a skill that he would later identify as foundational to his practice as a psychoanalyst.

== Career ==
Winnicott completed his medical studies in 1920, and in 1923, the same year as his marriage to the artist Alice Buxton Winnicott (born Taylor). She was a potter and they married on 7 July 1923 in St Mary's Church, Frensham. Alice had "severe psychological difficulties" and Winnicott arranged for her and his own therapy to address the difficulties this condition created. He obtained a post as physician at the Paddington Green Children's Hospital in London, where he was to work as a paediatrician and child psychoanalyst for 40 years. In 1923 he began a ten-year psychoanalysis with James Strachey, and in 1927 he began training as an analytic candidate. Strachey discussed Winnicott's case with his wife Alix Strachey, apparently reporting that Winnicott's sex life was affected by his anxieties. Winnicott's second analysis, beginning in 1936, was with Joan Riviere.

Winnicott rose to prominence as a psychoanalyst just as the followers of Anna Freud were in conflict with those of Melanie Klein for the right to be called Sigmund Freud's "true intellectual heirs". Out of the Controversial discussions during World War II, a compromise was reached with three more-or-less amicable groups within the psychoanalytic movement: the Anna Freudians, the Kleinians, and the Middle (or later Independent) Group of the British Psychoanalytical Society, to which Winnicott belonged, along with Ronald Fairbairn, Michael Balint, Masud Khan, John Bowlby, Marion Milner, and Margaret Little.

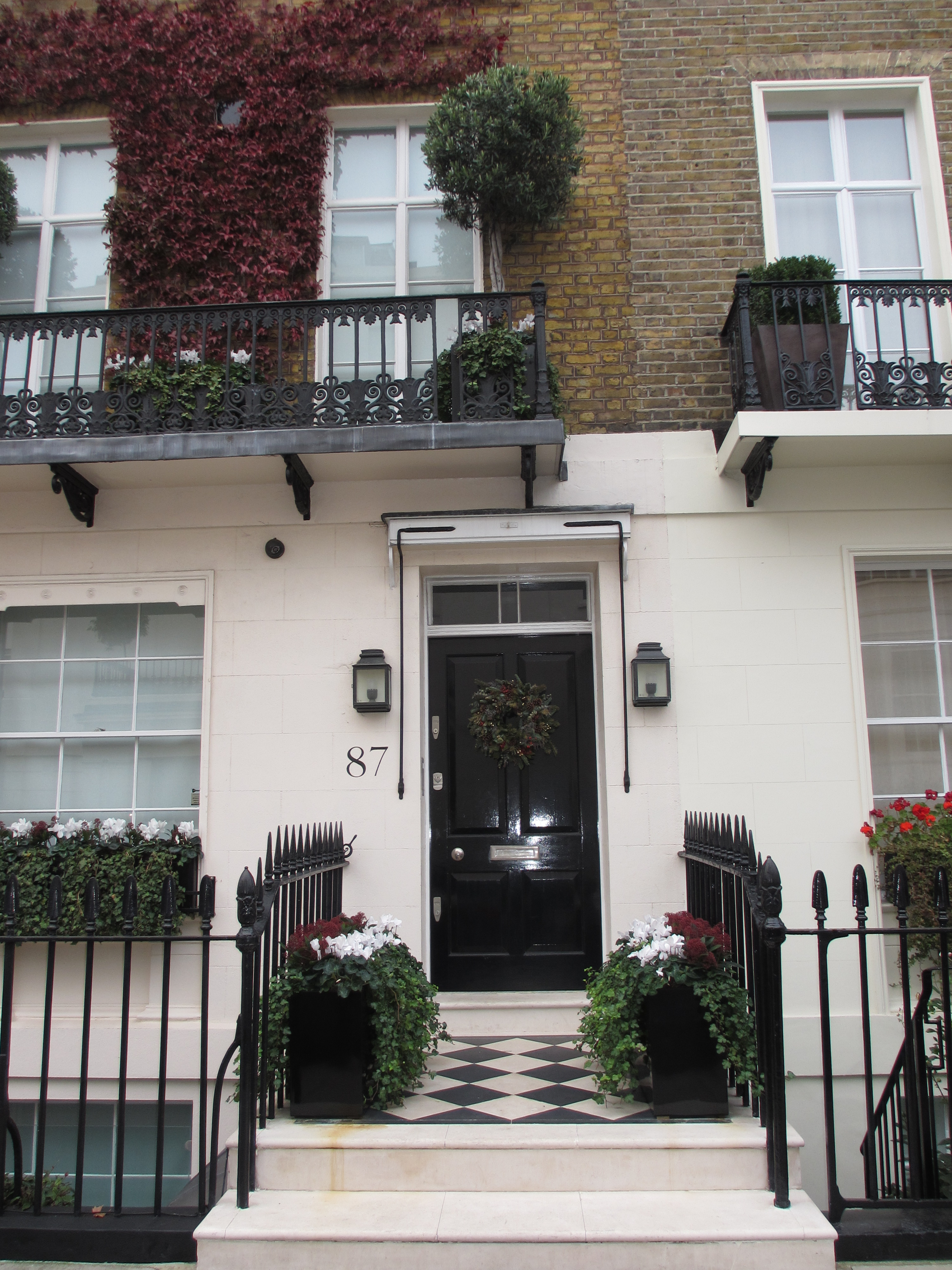
The Winnicotts' home - Chester Square (Belgravia) 1951–1971

During the Second World War, Winnicott served as consultant paediatrician to the children's evacuation programme. During the war, he met and worked with Clare Britton, a psychiatric social worker who became his colleague in treating children displaced from their homes by wartime evacuation. Winnicott was lecturing after the war and Janet Quigley and Isa Benzie of the BBC asked him to give over sixty talks on the radio between 1943 and 1966. His first series of talks in 1943 was titled "Happy Children". As a result of the success of these talks, Quigley offered him total control over the content of his talks but this soon became more consultative as Quigley advised him on the correct pitch.

After the war, Winnicott also saw patients in his private practice. Among contemporaries influenced by him was R. D. Laing, who wrote to Winnicott in 1958 acknowledging his help.

Winnicott divorced his first wife in 1949 and married Clare Britton (1906–1984) in 1951. A keen observer of children as a social worker and a psychoanalyst in her own right, she had an important influence on the development of his theories and likely acted as midwife to his prolific publications after they met.

Except for one book published in 1931 (Clinical Notes on Disorders of Childhood), all of Winnicott's books were published after 1944, including The Ordinary Devoted Mother and Her Baby (1949), The Child and the Family (1957), Playing and Reality (1971), and Holding and Interpretation: Fragment of an Analysis (1986).

Winnicott died on 25 January 1971, following the last of a series of heart attacks and was cremated in London. Clare Winnicott oversaw the posthumous publication of several of his works.

== Concept of holding ==
Winnicott's paediatric work with children and their mothers led to the development of his influential concept concerning the "holding environment". Winnicott claimed that "the foundations of health are laid down by the ordinary mother in her ordinary loving care of her own baby", central to which was the mother's attentive holding of her child.

Winnicott considered that the "mother's technique of holding, of bathing, of feeding, everything she did for the baby, added up to the child's first idea of the mother", as well as fostering the ability to experience the body as the place wherein one securely lives. Extrapolating the concept of holding from mother to family and the outside world, Winnicott saw as key to healthy development "the continuation of reliable holding in terms of the ever-widening circle of family and school and social life".

Winnicott was influential in viewing the work of the psychotherapist as offering a substitute holding environment based on the mother/infant bond. Winnicott wrote: "A correct and well-timed interpretation in an analytic treatment gives a sense of being held physically that is more real...than if a real holding or nursing had taken place. Understanding goes deeper".

His theoretical writings emphasised empathy, imagination, and, in the words of philosopher Martha Nussbaum, who has been a proponent of his work, "the highly particular transactions that constitute love between two imperfect people."

== Transitional phenomena and transitional objects ==
Winnicott introduced the concepts of transitional objects and transitional phenomena in his 1951 paper "Transitional Objects and Transitional Phenomena" and later elaborated on these ideas in his book Playing and Reality (1971) These concepts are among his most enduring and widely influential contributions to developmental psychology and psychoanalytic theory. He saw the transitional object as the first "not-me" possession, enabling the child to navigate between inner psychic reality and external shared reality. This concept formed a cornerstone of his broader theories about play, creativity, and cultural experience throughout life.

=== Concept and definition ===
Transitional phenomena refer to the intermediate developmental stage between a baby's inability and growing ability to recognize and accept reality. During this stage, the infant exists in an intermediate state between total fusion with the mother and recognition of the mother as separate from the self. The transitional object (often a teddy bear, blanket, or soft toy) facilitates this developmental process by serving as a symbolic substitute for the mother-infant bond.

The transitional object represents the infant's journey from a state of being merged with the mother to a state of being in relation to the mother as something outside and separate. Winnicott emphasised that the transitional object is not the mother substitute but represents the infant's transition from a state of being merged with the mother to a state of being in relation to the mother as something outside and separate.

==== Characteristics of transitional objects ====
According to Winnicott, the transitional object has several distinctive characteristics:

- The infant assumes rights over the object, which are respected by adults
- The object is affectionately cuddled as well as excitedly loved and mutilated
- It must never change, unless changed by the infant
- It must survive instinctual loving, hating, and aggression
- It must seem to the infant to give warmth, or to move, or to have texture, or to do something that seems to show it has vitality or reality of its own
- It comes from without from our point of view, but not from within from the point of view of the baby
- Its fate is to be gradually decathected (have emotional significance withdrawn), becoming not so much forgotten as relegated to limbo

=== Transitional space ===
Closely related to transitional phenomena is Winnicott's concept of "transitional space"—the hypothetical area that exists between the baby and the mother or caretaker. This space is neither purely subjective (originating within the infant's fantasy) nor purely objective (part of external shared reality), but partakes of both. Potential space is where cultural experience, creativity, play, and the use of symbols all originate. Winnicott theorised that this potential space—occurring between baby and mother, child and family, individual and society—develops through experiences that build trust. He considered this space vital to the individual, as it forms the foundation where creative living and cultural experience take place.

== Anti-social tendency ==
Connected to the concept of holding is what Winnicott called the anti-social tendency, something which he argued "may be found in a normal individual, or in one that is neurotic or psychotic". The delinquent child, Winnicott thought, was looking for a sense of secure holding lacking in their family of origin from society at large. In "The Antisocial Tendency" (1956), he argued that "the antisocial tendency is characterized by an element in it which compels the environment to be important." He emphasized that antisocial behavior represents hope rather than mere defiance - hope that the environment will acknowledge and repair earlier deprivation.

Winnicott identified two main patterns within the antisocial tendency:

1. Stealing and related behaviors (like lying), which represent the child's unconscious search for something lost - metaphorically seeking the good relationship or environmental provision that had been interrupted
2. Destructiveness, which represents the child's attempt to find an environmental framework strong enough to withstand aggression and provide security.

According to Winnicott, the antisocial tendency develops when a child experiences "deprivation" - not a simple privation (absence of good experience), but the loss of something positive that had once been enjoyed. Child psychotherapist Judith Issroff observes that this distinction was crucial to his theory, as it emphasized that the child must have experienced 'good enough' care at some point to develop antisocial tendencies following deprivation.

In "Some Psychological Aspects of Juvenile Delinquency" (1946), Winnicott elaborated: "When a child steals outside his own home he is still looking for his mother, but he is looking with a greater sense of frustration... In full-blown delinquency it is difficult for us as observers, because what meets us is the child's acute need for the strict father, who will protect mother when she is found."

Winnicott's approach to treatment differed significantly from punitive models. He advocated providing a reliable, containing environment that could recognize the "cry for help" fuelled by a sense of loss of integrity, when the familial holding environment was inadequate or ruptured within antisocial behavior. In residential settings like the Paddington Green Children's Hospital where he worked for decades, Winnicott emphasized that staff must "survive" the challenging behaviors without retaliating vindictively, thereby giving children the opportunity to develop trust and more adaptive ways of relating.

== Play and the sense of being real ==
One of the elements that Winnicott considered could be lost in childhood was what he called the sense of being – for him, a primary element, of which a sense of doing is only a derivative. The capacity for being – the ability to feel genuinely alive inside, which Winnicott saw as essential to the maintenance of a true self – was fostered in his view by the practice of childhood play.

In contrast to the emphasis in orthodox psychoanalysis upon generating insight into unconscious processes, Winnicott considered that playing was the key to emotional and psychological well-being. It is likely that he first came upon this notion from his collaboration in wartime with the psychiatric social worker, Clare Britton (later a psychoanalyst and his second wife), who in 1945 published an article on the importance of play for children. By "playing", he meant not only the ways that children of all ages play, but also the way adults "play" through making art, or engaging in sports, hobbies, humour, meaningful conversation, et cetera. At any age, he saw play as crucial to the development of authentic selfhood, because when people play they feel real, spontaneous and alive, and keenly interested in what they are doing. He thought that insight in psychoanalysis was helpful when it came to the patient as a playful experience of creative, genuine discovery; dangerous when patients were pressured to comply with their analyst's authoritative interpretations, thus potentially merely reinforcing a patient's false self. Winnicott believed that it was only in playing that people are entirely their true selves, so it followed that for psychoanalysis to be effective, it needed to serve as a mode of playing.

Two of the techniques whereby Winnicott used play in his work with children were the squiggle game and the spatula game. The first involved Winnicott drawing a shape for the child to play with and extend (or vice versa) – a practice extended by his followers into that of using partial interpretations as a 'squiggle' for a patient to make use of.

The second, more famous instance involved Winnicott placing a spatula (tongue depressor) within the child's reach for him to play with. Winnicott considered that "if he is just an ordinary baby he will notice the attractive object...and he will reach for it....[then] in the course of a little while he will discover what he wants to do with it". From the child's initial hesitation in making use of the spatula, Winnicott derived his idea of the necessary 'period of hesitation' in childhood (or analysis), which makes possible a true connection to the toy, interpretation or object presented for transference.

Many of Winnicott's writings show his efforts to understand what helps people to be able to play, and on the other hand what blocks some people from playing. Babies can be playful when they are cared for by people who respond to them warmly and playfully, like a mother who smiles and says, "Peek-a-boo!" when she sees her baby playfully peeking out from behind his hands. If the mother never responded playfully, sooner or later the baby would stop trying to elicit play from her. Indeed, Winnicott came to consider that "Playing takes place in the potential space between the baby and the mother-figure....[T]he initiation of playing is associated with the life experience of the baby who has come to trust the mother figure". "Potential space" was Winnicott's term for a sense of an inviting and safe interpersonal field in which one can be spontaneously playful while at the same time connected to others (again a concept that has been extrapolated to the practice of analysis).

Playing can also be seen in the use of a transitional object, Winnicott's term for an object, such as a teddy bear, that has a quality for a small child of being both real and made-up at the same time. Winnicott pointed out that no one demands that a toddler explain whether his Binky is a "real bear" or a creation of the child's own imagination, and went on to argue that it is very important that the child is allowed to experience the Binky as being in an undefined, "transitional" status between the child's imagination and the real world outside the child. For Winnicott, one of the most important and precarious stages of development was in the first three years of life, when an infant grows into a child with an increasingly separate sense of self in relation to a larger world of other people. In health, the child learns to bring his or her spontaneous, real self into play with others; in a false self disorder, the child has found it unsafe or impossible to do so, and instead feels compelled to hide the true self from other people, and pretend to be whatever they want instead. Playing with a transitional object can be an important early bridge between self and other, which helps a child develop the capacity to be genuine in relationships, and creative.

Playing for Winnicott ultimately extended all the way up from earliest childhood experience to what he called "the abstractions of politics and economics and philosophy and culture...this 'third area', that of cultural experience which is a derivative of play".

== True self and false self ==
Winnicott wrote that "a word like self...knows more than we do.". He meant that, while philosophical and psychoanalytic ideas about the self could be very complex and arcane, with a great deal of specialised jargon, there was a pragmatic usefulness to the ordinary word "self" with its range of traditional meanings. For example, where other psychoanalysts used the Freudian terminology of ego and id to describe different functions of a person's psychology, Winnicott at times used "self" to refer to both. For Winnicott, the self is a very important part of mental and emotional well-being which plays a vital role in creativity. He thought that people were born without a clearly developed self and had to "search" for an authentic sense of self as they grew. "For Winnicott, the sense of feeling real, feeling in touch with others and with one's own body and its processes was essential for living a life."

=== True self ===
"Only the true self can be creative and only the true self can feel real."

Winnicott believed one of the developmental hurdles for an infant to pass is the risk of being traumatised by being too aware too soon of how small and helpless they really are. A baby who is too aware of real-world dangers will be too anxious to learn optimally. A good-enough parent is well enough attuned and responsive to protect the baby with an illusion of omnipotence, or being all-powerful. For example, a well-cared-for baby usually does not feel hungry for very long before being fed. Winnicott thought the parents' quick response of feeding the baby gives the baby a sense that whenever she's hungry, food appears as if by magic, as if the baby herself makes food appear just by being hungry. To feel this powerful, Winnicott thought, allowed a baby to feel confident, calm and curious, and able to learn without having to invest a lot of energy into defences.

=== False self ===
In Winnicott's writing, the "False Self" is a defence, a kind of mask of behaviour that complies with others' expectations. Winnicott thought that in health, a False Self was what allowed one to present a "polite and mannered attitude" in public.

But he saw more serious emotional problems in patients who seemed unable to feel spontaneous, alive or real to themselves anywhere, in any part of their lives, yet managed to put on a successful "show of being real". Such patients suffered inwardly from a sense of being empty, dead or "phoney".

Winnicott thought that this more extreme kind of False Self began to develop in infancy, as a defence against an environment that felt unsafe or overwhelming because of a lack of reasonably attuned caregiving. He thought that parents did not need to be perfectly attuned, but just "ordinarily devoted" or "good enough" to protect the baby from often experiencing overwhelming extremes of discomfort and distress, emotional or physical. But babies who lack this kind of external protection, Winnicott thought, had to do their best with their own crude defences.

One of the main defences Winnicott thought a baby could resort to was what he called "compliance", or behaviour motivated by a desire to please others rather than spontaneously express one's own feelings and ideas. For example, if a baby's caregiver was severely depressed, the baby would anxiously sense a lack of responsiveness, would not be able to enjoy an illusion of omnipotence, and might instead focus his energies and attentions on finding ways to get a positive response from the distracted and unhappy caregiver by being a "good baby". The "False Self" is a defence of constantly seeking to anticipate others' demands and complying with them, as a way of protecting the "True Self" from a world that is felt to be unsafe.

Winnicott thought that the "False Self" developed through a process of introjection (a concept developed early on by Freud) or internalising one's experience of others. Instead of basing his personality on his own unforced feelings, thoughts, and initiatives, the person with a "False Self" disorder would essentially be imitating and internalising other people's behaviour – a mode in which he could outwardly come to seem "just like" his mother, father, brother, nurse, or whoever had dominated his world, but inwardly he would feel bored, empty, dead, or "phoney". Winnicott saw this as an unconscious process: not only others but also the person himself would mistake his False Self for his real personality. But even with the appearance of success, and of social gains, he would feel unreal and lack the sense of really being alive or happy.

The division of the True and False self roughly develops from Freud's (1923) notion of the Superego which compels the Ego to modify and inhibit libidinal Id impulses, possibly leading to excessive repression but certainly altering the way the environment is perceived and responded to. However, it is not a close equation as the Id, Ego and Superego are complex and dynamic inter-related systems that do not fit well into such a dichotomy. The theory more closely resembles Carl Rogers' simplified notions of the Real and Ideal self. According to Winnicott, in every person the extent of division between True and False Self can be placed on a continuum between the healthy and the pathological. The True Self, which in health gives the person a sense of being alive, real, and creative, will always be in part or in whole hidden; the False Self is a compliant adaptation to the environment, but in health it does not dominate the person's internal life or block him from feeling spontaneous feelings, even if he chooses not to express them. The healthy False Self feels that it is still being true to the True Self. It can be compliant to expectations but without feeling that it has betrayed its "True Self".

== Winnicott on Carl Jung ==
Winnicott's assessment of Carl Jung, appeared when he published an extensive review of Jung's partially autobiographical work, Memories, Dreams, Reflections. In it, Winnicott focuses on the first three chapters of the work – and in particular the first chapter, 'First Years' – which he felt every psychoanalyst must read. He discusses Jung's evident early experiences of psychotic illness from around the age of four, from within his own theoretical framework. He goes on to comment on the relationship between Sigmund Freud and Jung. He also discusses the Jungian 'unconscious' and Jung's concept of the 'self'.

== Criticism and influence ==
Winnicott's theoretical elusiveness has been linked to his efforts to modify Kleinian views. Yet whereas from a Kleinian standpoint, his repudiation of the concepts of envy and the death drive were a resistant retreat from the harsh realities Klein had found in infant life, he has also been accused of being too close to her, of sharing in her regressive shift of focus away from the Oedipus complex to the pre-oedipal.

The psychoanalyst, Jan Abram, a former director of the Squiggle Foundation, intended to promote Winnicott's work, who therefore may be said to be partisan, has proposed a coherent interpretation for the omission of Winnicott's theories from many mainstream psychoanalytic trainings. His view of the environment and use of accessible everyday language, addressing the parent community, as opposed to just the Kleinian psychoanalytic community, may account in part for the distancing and making him somewhat "niche".

Winnicott has also been accused of identifying himself in his theoretical stance with an idealised mother, in the tradition of mother (Madonna) and child. Related is his downplaying of the importance of the erotic in his work, as well as the Wordsworthian Romanticism of his cult of childhood play (exaggerated still further in some of his followers).

His theories of the true/false self may have been over-influenced by his own childhood experience of caring for a depressed mother, which resulted in the development of a prematurely mature self which he was only subsequently able to undo.

Winnicott has been criticised for referring to a child with Down's syndrome in 1968, the son of the architect Theo Crosby and his wife Anne, as a "Throwaway Child", and recommending that the child be placed in an institution.

Nevertheless, Winnicott remains one of the few twentieth-century analysts who, in stature, breadth, minuteness of observations, and theoretical fertility can legitimately be compared to Sigmund Freud. Along with Jacques Derrida, Winnicott is a fundamental resource for philosopher Bernard Stiegler's What Makes Life Worth Living: On Pharmacology (2010).

== Bibliography ==
- Clinical Notes on Disorders of Childhood (London: Heinemann, 1931)
- C. Britton and D. W. Winnicott, "The problem of homeless children". The New Era in Home and School. 25, 1944, 155–161
- Getting To Know Your Baby (London: Heinemann, 1945)
- The Child and the Family (London: Tavistock, 1957)
- The Child and the Outside World (London: Tavistock, 1957)
- Collected Papers: Through Paediatrics to Psychoanalysis (London: Tavistock, 1958)
- Review: Memories, Dreams, Reflections: By C. G. Jung (London: Collins and Routledge, 1963). Donald W. Winnicott. DOI:10.1093/med:psych/9780190271398.003.0016
- The Child, the Family and the Outside World (London: Pelican Books, 1964)
- The Family and Individual Development (London: Tavistock, 1965)
- Maturational Processes and the Facilitating Environment: Studies in the Theory of Emotional Development (London: Hogarth Press, 1965)
- Playing and Reality (London: Tavistock, 1971)
- Therapeutic Consultation in Child Psychiatry (London: Hogarth Press, 1971)
- The Piggle: An Account of the Psychoanalytic Treatment of a Little Girl (London: Hogarth Press, 1971) ISBN 0-140-1466-79

=== Posthumous ===
- Simon A. Grolnick; Leonard Barkin; Werner Muensterberger, eds. (1978). Between reality and fantasy: transitional objects and phenomena. Classical psychoanalysis and its applications. J. Aronson. ISBN 978-0-876683187.
- Deprivation and Delinquency (London: Tavistock, 1984)
- Human Nature (Winnicott Trust, 1988) notebooks
- Kanter, Joel, ed. (2004). Face to Face with Children. The Life and Work of Clare Winnicott. London, New York: Routledge. ISBN 978-1-85575-997-8.
- Lesley Caldwell; Helen Taylor Robinson, eds. (2016). The Collected Works of D. W. Winnicott. Oxford University Press. ISBN 978-0-19-939933-8.
- Karnac, Harry (2018). After Winnicott: Compilation of Works Based on the Life, Writings and Ideas of D.W. Winnicott. London: Routledge. ISBN 978-0-429910661.

== See also ==
- Adam Phillips
- Capacity to be alone
- Eidolon
- Good enough parent
- Joseph J. Sandler
- Reparation (psychoanalysis)
- Unthought known
