= Joan Riviere =

British psychoanalyst (1883–1962)

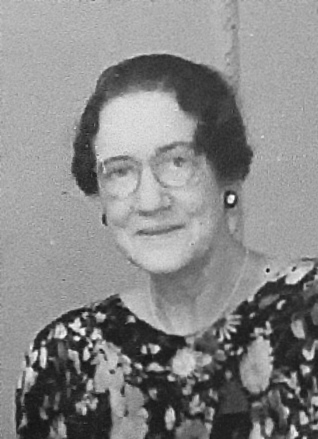
- Joan Riviere in 1952
- Born: Joan Hodgson Verrall; 28 June 1883; Brighton, Sussex, England
- Died: 20 May 1962 (aged 78); Paddington, London, England
- Occupations: Psychoanalyst; translator
- Spouse: Evelyn Riviere (m. 1908)

Joan Hodgson Riviere (née Verrall; 28 June 1883 – 20 May 1962) was a British psychoanalyst, who was both an early translator of Sigmund Freud into English and an influential writer on her own account.

== Life and career ==
Riviere was born Joan Hodgson Verrall in Brighton, the daughter of Hugh John Verrall and his wife Ann Hodgson. Her father was a lawyer and her mother a vicar's daughter. She was educated in Brighton and then at Wycombe Abbey. At the age of seventeen, she went to Gotha, Germany, where she spent a year and became proficient in the German language. Her interests were primarily artistic and she was for a time a court dressmaker.

Riviere married Evelyn Riviere in 1907 and had a child, but suffered a breakdown on the death of her father around that time. She took an interest in divorce reform and the suffragette movement. Her uncle, Arthur Woollgar Verrall organised meetings of the Society for Psychical Research where she discovered the work of Sigmund Freud and Ernest Jones, and this stimulated her interest in psychoanalysis. Suffering from emotional distress, she went for therapeutic psychoanalysis with Ernest Jones in 1916. In 1916 and 1917 she spent some time in a sanatorium because of nerves. Jones was impressed by her understanding of psychoanalytic principles and processes and she became a founding member of the British Psychoanalytical Society, formed in 1919. At the Hague conference in 1920, she met Freud for the first time and asked to be analysed by him. She also met Melanie Klein. She was translation editor of the International Journal of Psycho-Analysis from its inception in 1920 until 1937. In 1921 she worked with Freud and his daughter Anna Freud, Ernest Jones, James Strachey and Alix Strachey on the Glossary Committee, and translating Freud's work into English. She supervised the translation and editing of volumes 1, 2 and 4 of the Collected Papers, and is arguably the best translator of Freud's work: 'the incomparable Joan Riviere, that "tall Edwardian beauty with picture hat and scarlet parasol", whose renderings retained more of Freud's stylistic energy than any others'.

Meanwhile, her personal analysis with Jones had become difficult and when he reached an impasse, he recommended her to Sigmund Freud for further psychoanalysis. This took place in Vienna in 1922.

When she returned to London, Riviere became actively involved in the work of the British Psychoanalytical Society. She met Klein again in Salzburg in 1924 and became a key proponent of Melanie Klein's ideas. In 1929 she was assisting Sylvia Payne in organising the Oxford conference. She became a training analyst in 1930 and was the analyst of Susan Isaacs, John Bowlby, and Donald Winnicott and supervised Hanna Segal, Herbert Rosenfeld, and Henri Rey. Her supervisees 'all pay tribute to her originality, intellect, sensitivity, kindness, and culture, as well as to her sharp tongue and forcefulness'. James Strachey concluded that 'indeed, she was a very formidable person'; and when in her paper on "Hate" she wrote of 'an elation which is pleasurable on overcoming an obstacle, or on getting one's own way' she may (as so often) have been rooting her comments in personal experience.

As well as translating Freud's work, Riviere published several seminal works of her own. In 1929 she published "Womanliness as a Masquerade" in which she looks at an area of sexual development of intellectual women in particular, where femininity is a defensive mask that is put on to hide masculinity. In 1932 she published "Jealousy as a Mechanism of Defence" in which jealousy is seen to be a defence against envy aroused by the primal scene. In 1936 she incorporated Melanie Klein's findings on the depressive position in "A Contribution to the Analysis of the Negative Therapeutic Reaction". In the same year she managed to put Klein's theories in the context of Freud's work in "The Genesis of Psychical Conflict in Earliest Infancy," delivered in Vienna in honour of Freud's 80th birthday.

From 1942 to 1944 Riviere took an active role in the Controversial discussions at the British Psychoanalytical Society, in particular supporting the Kleinian faction. 'However, by the 1950s Riviere was dissociating herself from the circle of disciples who surrounded Klein'.

Riviere married Evelyn Riviere (1876–1945), a barrister and son of artist Briton Rivière, in 1906. Their only child, Diana, was born in 1908.

She died in Paddington, London.

== Seminal writings ==
Her paper on "On the Genesis of Psychical Conflict in Early Infancy" has been described as 'the clearest and most beautifully expressed outline of Kleinian theory as it was at that time'. In general, 'Riviere often presents Kleinian ideas in ways that are more accessible and elegant than Klein's densely packed papers, and she may also have helped Klein to express herself more effectively in English'.

In "Jealousy as a Mechanism of Defence" (1932), 'impelled by the Kleinian vision, Riviere proceeded to chart highly original ground, linking morbid jealousy to envy of the primal scene some twenty-five years before Klein'.

Her account of "womanliness" as a masquerade was taken up by Lacan as part of his exploration of The Imaginary and The Symbolic: 'a term which I have not introduced, but of which one female psycho-analyst has pin-pointed the feminine sexual attitude – the term masquerade '. Subsequently the same view, of femininity as performance, 'has been appropriated for a variety of de-essentializing and deconstructive versions of gender as performance (most influentially in late twentieth-century feminist and film theory)'.

Her "Contribution to the Analysis of the Negative Therapeutic Reaction" is 'widely regarded as her most important contribution to psychoanalytic theory', building as it did on her personal experience – 'drawing on the painful experiences bound up with her analyses with Jones and Freud'. Freud had originally formulated the concept of the negative therapeutic reaction in large part out of his experience in analyzing Riviere: 'She cannot tolerate praise, triumph or success...she is sure to become unpleasant and aggressive and to lose respect for the analyst' whenever success loomed in sight. Such patients were characterised in his view by 'what may be called a "moral" facto, a sense of guilt, which is finding its satisfaction in the illness and refuses to give up the punishment of suffering.

By contrast Riviere (drawing on Klein) 'puts the emphasis elsewhere...focuses attention on the patient's despair about her inner world and her hopelessness about making reparation'. She described forcefully the patient's 'trait of deceptiveness, the mask, which conceals this subtle reservation of all control under intellectual rationalisations, or under feigned compliance and superficial politeness'. Even 'apparent improvement may be based on a manic defence: "The patient exploits us in his own way instead of being fully analysed"'. Such manic defences were however for Riviere a desperate attempt to avoid the depressive pain of an empty inner world. 'Apropos of the resistances that mask the depressive position, Riviere slips in a revealing sentence that can be read at once professionally and confessionally: "This has been my own experience"'.

== Other publications ==
- Womanliness as a masquerade. International Journal of Psychoanalysis, 10, 303–313. Reprinted in Hurly-Burly, 3, 75–84.
- Jealousy as a mechanism of defence. International Journal of Psychoanalysis, 13, 414–424.(1932).
- A contribution to the analysis of a negative therapeutic reaction. International Journal of Psychoanalysis, 17, 304–320.(1936).
- On the genesis of psychic conflict in earliest infancy. International Journal of Psycho-Analysis, 17, 395–422.(1936).
- The inner world in Ibsen's "Master Builder." International Journal of Psycho-Analysis, 33, 173–180.(1952).
- Developments in psycho-analysis by Joan Riviere (Book)
- Love, hate and reparation; two lectures co-written with Melanie Klein

Athol Hughes ed., The Inner World and Joan Riviere: Collected Papers 1920–1958 (London 1991)

== Translations ==
- Collected papers by Sigmund Freud. Authorized translation under the supervision of Joan Riviere
- A General Introduction to Psychoanalysis by Sigmund Freud. Authorized English translation by Joan Riviere, with a preface by Ernest Jones and G. Stanley Hall
- The Ego and the Id by Sigmund Freud
- Freud, Sigmund (1930). Civilization and Its Discontents. Translated by Riviere, Joan. London: Leonard & Virginia Woolf at the Hogarth Press and the Institute for Psycho-analysis – via Internet Archive.
