= Edward Glover (psychoanalyst) =

British psychoanalyst (1888–1972)

Edward George Glover
- Born: January 13, 1888; Lesmahagow, Scotland
- Died: August 16, 1972; London, England
- Education: University of Glasgow
- Occupations: Psychoanalyst, physician
- Known for: Founding member of the British Psycho-Analytical Society; co-founder of the Portman Clinic; opposition to Kleinian psychoanalysis
- Notable work: The Technique of Psycho-Analysis; War, Sadism and Pacifism; Freud or Jung?; Notes on Oral Character; The Screening Function of Traumatic Memories
- Spouse(s): 1st wife (died in childbirth); 2nd wife
- Children: One daughter with Down syndrome
- Awards: Annual "Glover Lecture" at the Portman Clinic

Edward George Glover (13 January 1888 – 16 August 1972) was a British psychoanalyst, born in Lesmahagow. He first studied medicine and surgery, and it was his elder brother, James Glover (1882–1926) who attracted him towards psychoanalysis. Both brothers were analysed in Berlin by Karl Abraham; indeed, the "list of Karl Abraham's analysands reads like a roster of psychoanalytic eminence: the leading English analysts Edward and James Glover" at the top. He then settled down in London where he became an influential member of the British Psycho-Analytical Society in 1921. He was also close to Ernest Jones.

Amongst Edward Glover's most lasting achievements in the combined field of psychotherapy and criminology – aside from his clinical work and extensive publications – are his roles as: co-founder of the Psychopathic Clinic (renamed the Portman Clinic in 1937) and the Institute for the Study and Treatment of Delinquency, joint founder of The British Journal of Criminology – he was co-editor until his death – and co-founder of the British Society of Criminology. He was one-time chairman of the medical section of the British Psychological Society. He is publicly remembered in the annual Glover lecture, delivered under the auspices of the Portman Clinic.

== Early life ==
Glover was the third son of a highly gifted country schoolmaster who was a professed Darwinian agnostic.

He suffered family tragedies throughout his life. His second brother died at the age of 6 when Edward was 4, and James, his much-admired elder brother, died in his 30s. Later in life his first wife died in childbirth along with their child. From his second marriage he had a daughter who had Down's Syndrome, whom Glover and his wife cared for at home for many years.

Glover entered the medical school in Glasgow at the age of 16 and graduated at 21 with distinction. It is reported that as a student he was prominent in socialist politics and was involved in a revolutionary move to propose Keir Hardie as rector of the university. There followed several years of academic medicine, working first in Glasgow with the professor of medicine and paediatrics and then in pulmonary medicine in London. With the outbreak of the First World War he was appointed medical superintendent of a sanatorium for the treatment of early chest diseases in Birmingham.

== Early texts (1924–1939) ==
Between 1924 and 1939, Glover published his first book as well as some eighteen articles on psychoanalytic subjects ranging from "Notes on Oral Character" through "The Screening Function of Traumatic Memories" to "A Note on Idealisation".

'Glover once [1931] wrote a very interesting paper in which he investigated the ways in which incomplete or inexact interpretations, and also other psychotherapeutic procedures, influence the patient's mind...[as] artificial substitute symptoms, which may make the spontaneous symptoms superfluous. Lacan would make use of Glover's findings to support his exploration of "The function and field of speech and language in psychoanalysis" on more than one occasion: 'Mr Edward Glover in a remarkable paper...[suggests] not only is every spoken intervention received by the subject in terms of his structure, but the intervention takes on a structuring function in him in proportion to its form'. Thus 'Glover...finds interpretation everywhere, being unable to stop it anywhere, even in the banality of a medical prescription'.

Glover's "Lectures on Technique in Psychoanalysis" (1927–28) would seem to have offered a dry, neutral, asceptic classical psychoanalysis. Thus on the question of whether analysis should close with a "cooling-off" period, he followed the classical line 'that "to the very end we continue the analytic process", as the English analyst Edward Glover wrote in The Technique of Psychoanalysis, first published in 1928 and revised in 1955. Glover sternly continues, "In the first session we laid down the association rule, and this remains in force to the last minute of the last session".

Similarly on the question of the early "deep interpretation" favoured for example by Melanie Klein, Glover argued: 'Once the analyst departs from sparing, provisional interpretations, he not only disturbs the listening situation but has made it difficult to re-establish it'.

== Psychoanalytic controversies ==
Glover was a combative intellectual personality who took a principled stand on many of the variegated controversies of the first psychoanalytic half-century, promoting a 'pure Freudianism'.

In the early 1920s, when Karl Abraham 'feared that Ferenczi and, far worse, Rank, were caught in an act of "scientific regression". English psychoanalysts, notably Ernest Jones and the brothers Edward and James Glover, wholly agreed with Abraham'.

In the later 1920s, when Freud made something of a minority stand in support of Lay analysis, 'some of the British psychoanalysts, among them Edward Glover and John Rickman, saw no harm in nonmedical therapists conducting analysis, provided one kept therapy "sharply divided from diagnosis: the latter must be left to medically qualified persons"'.

Glover worked with Jones in the British Medical Association in obtaining the so-called "Psycho-Analytical Charter" – 'Edward Glover and myself had for over three years fought at heavy odds against our twenty-five bitter opponents'.

In the thirties, Glover found himself increasingly opposed to the innovations and influence of Melanie Klein, who found "from 1934 onwards, a hostility within the British Psycho-Analytic Society" led by "Glover [who] was scientific secretary of the British Society" – "hostility which lasted for the best part of a decade until the 'vituperative opposition from Edward Glover and Melitta Schmideberg had vanished when Glover gave up his membership of the British Psycho-analytical Society the 24th January 1944, confirmed the next 1 February'". At this point, Glover declared that 'The British Psycho-Analytical Society is no longer a Freudian society' and its 'deviation from psychoanalysis'; and the following year, the fundamental Kleinian position paper by Susan Sutherland Isaacs on "Phantasy" was publicly 'attacked by Glover (1945)', in the first volume of The Psychoanalytic Study of the child, where he described what he called "the Klein System of Child Psychology" as 'a bio-religious system which depends on faith rather than science...a variant of the doctrine of Original Sin'.

In the following decade, Glover turned his fire from Klein to Jung: his book, Freud or Jung? (1956) is a partisan Freudian—though defensible—polemic'. In it he argued (incidentally) for the firm conceptual separation of art and psychopathology. 'Glover put this view most trenchantly: "Whatever its original unconscious aim, the work of art represents a forward urge of the libido seeking to maintain its hold on the world of objects...not the result of a pathological breakdown".

In the 1960s, Glover aroused the ire of Jacques Lacan by way of his attack on Franz Alexander's concept of the corrective emotional experience: 'When I read in the Psychoanalytic Quarterly an article like the one by Mr Edward Glover, entitled Freudian or Neo-Freudian, directed entirely against the constructions of Mr Alexander, I sense a sordid smell of stuffiness,...Alexander being counter-attacked in the name of obsolete criteria'.

Glover died in 1972 in London.

== Publications ==
- War, Sadism and Pacifism: Three Essays, London: G. Allen & Unwin, 1933.
- War, Sadism and Pacifism. Further essays on group psychology and war, London: G. Allen & Unwin, 1947.
- Freud or Jung ?, Publisher: Meridian Books, NY, 1957
- Psycho-Analysis, Publisher: Roberts Press, 2007, ISBN 1-4067-4733-5
