= Comfort object =

Item used to provide psychological comfort

A comfort object, more formally a transitional object or attachment object, is an item used to provide psychological comfort, especially in unusual or unique situations, or at bedtime for children. Among toddlers, a comfort object often takes the form of a blanket (called a security blanket) or a stuffed animal, doll or other toy, and may be referred to with an affectionate nickname such as “blankie”.

Comfort objects are said to enable children to gain independence and research indicates that these objects have positive effects on children by reducing anxiety in later life.

== In child psychology ==
Legend: (a) mother, (b) child, (1) illusion, (2) transitional object

In human childhood development, the term transitional object is normally used. It is something, usually a physical object, which takes the place of the mother-child bond. Common examples include dolls, teddy bears or blankets.

Donald Woods Winnicott introduced the concepts of transitional objects and transitional experience in reference to a particular developmental sequence. With "transition" Winnicott means an intermediate developmental phase between the psychic and external reality. In this "transitional space" we can find the "transitional object".

When the young child begins to separate the "me" from the "not-me" and evolves from complete dependence to a stage of relative independence, it uses transitional objects. Infants see themselves and the mother as a whole. In this phase the mother "brings the world" to the infant without delay which gives it a "moment of illusion", a belief that its own wish creates the object of its desire which brings with it a sense of satisfaction. Winnicott calls this subjective omnipotence. Alongside the subjective omnipotence of a child, lies an objective reality, which constitutes the child's awareness of separateness between itself and desired objects. While the subjective omnipotence experience is one in which the child feels that its desires create satisfaction, the objective reality experience is one in which the child independently seeks out objects of desire.

Later on the child comes to realize that the mother is a separate entity, which tells the child that they have lost something. The child realizes that they are dependent on others, thus losing the idea that they are independent. This realization creates a difficult period and brings frustration and anxiety with it. The mother cannot always be there to "bring the world" to the baby, a realization which has a powerful, somewhat painful, but ultimately constructive impact on the child. Through fantasizing about the object of its wishes the child will find comfort. A transitional object can be used in this process. The transitional object is often the first "not me" possession that really belongs to the child. This could be a real object like a blanket or a teddy bear, but other "objects", such as a melody or a word, can fulfill this role as well. This object represents all components of "mothering", and it means that the child itself is able to create what it needs as well. It enables the child to have a fantasized bond with the mother when she gradually separates for increasingly longer periods of time. The transitional object is important at the time of going to sleep and as a defense against anxiety. In a study conducted in Brazil, children who used transitional objects were able to calm down and go to sleep more easily than children who did not use transitional objects.

In a later stage of the development, the child no longer needs the transitional object. It is able to make a distinction between "me" and "not-me", keeping inside and outside apart and yet interrelated. This development leads to the use of illusion, symbols and objects later on in life.

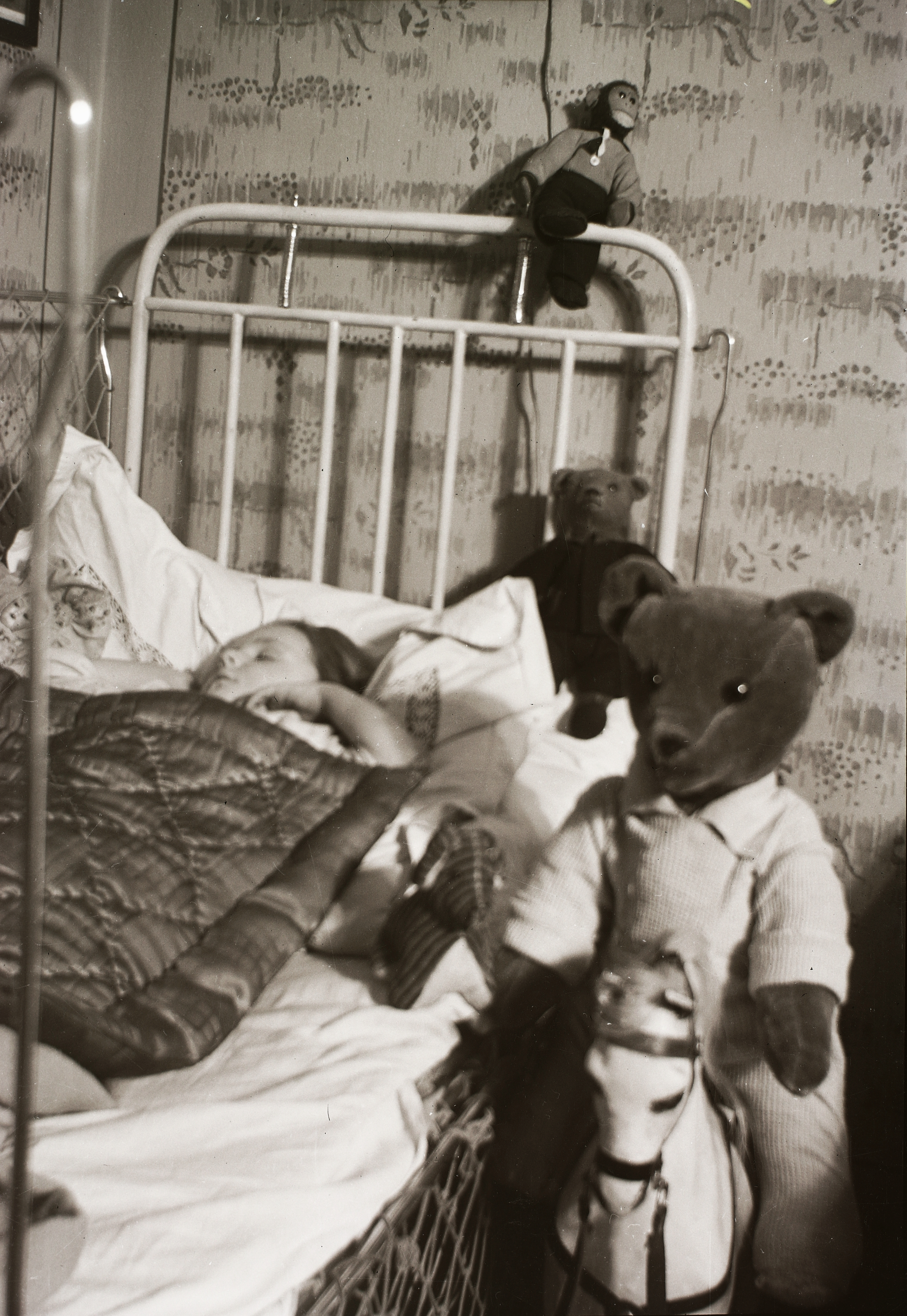
Several bedtime comfort objects for a child in 1943

Winnicott related the concept of transitional object to a more general one, transitional phenomena, which he considered to be the basis of science, religion and all of culture. Transitional objects and phenomena, he said, are neither subjective nor objective but partake of both. In Mental Space, Robert Young has provided an exposition of these concepts and has generalized their role into psychic phenomena in adult life.

Research with children on this subject was performed at the University of Wisconsin–Milwaukee by Richard H. Passman and his associates. Among other findings, they showed that security blankets are appropriately named – they actually do give security to those children attached to them. Along with other positive benefits, having a security blanket available can help children adapt to new situations, aid in their learning, and adjust to physicians' and clinical psychologists' evaluations. Passman's research also points out that there is nothing abnormal about being attached to them. In the United States, about 60% of children have at least some attachment to a security object. A bedtime toy is often used by children while going to sleep. It is typically a plush toy or something of that nature that children can cuddle up with while going to sleep. It is sometimes combined with a nightlight. Bedtime toys are typically of an animal, such as the common teddy bear, or any other creature, such as a mythical creature or fictional character. The toy is often used for physical comfort, and most commonly psychological comfort for children with separation anxiety and a strong fear of the night.

== Therapeutic use ==
Emergency vehicles and police patrol cars are sometimes equipped with stuffed toys, to be given to victims involved in car accidents or traumatic shock situations in order to provide them comfort.

Often charities will provide comfort objects such as blankets and quilts to survivors of disasters.

After the September 11 attacks, writes Marita Sturken in Tourists of History, "the Oklahoma City National Memorial sent six hundred teddy bears and then the state of Oklahoma sent sixty thousand stuffed animals to New York, which were distributed to children in schools affected by 9/11, family support organizations, and New York fire stations."

== Use by adults ==
Adults may also use comfort objects. Many adults consider the comfort that security blankets provide as essential to their mental and emotional well-being. Additionally, according to a 2011 survey by Travelodge, about 35 percent of British adults sleep with a teddy bear. In a 2008 study, the Sony AIBO robotic pet was found to decrease loneliness among elderly in nursing homes.

The notion of a "comfort object" may be expanded to include representations of one's family, home, and culture. It is significant to the person and gives psychological strength and assistance by representing their emotional attachments. The object helps with one's capacity to be alone. These objects can include photographs, memorabilia, music records, and even artwork made with family members. With the increase in movement away from home, and sometimes constant movement from one place to another for job opportunities or immigration, it is very common for people to carry these items with them. People may look to these objects for emotional support during transitional periods, such as assimilating to a new area, or when experiencing trauma or a significant loss.

== Cross-cultural uses ==
Researchers have observed that the incidence of attachment behavior toward inanimate objects differs depending on the culture in which the infant was raised. It is suggested that infants' attachment to inanimate objects would be less frequent in societies in which in an infant may spend most of the day in close contact with their mother. In particular, in Western countries object attachments were indeed found to be common, with rates reaching as high as 60%. In a study conducted by Michael Hong, it was found that around 50% of American children and only around 20% of Korean children developed an attachment to a blanket or an equivalent type of primary transitional objects. A similar study by Renata Gaddini found that around 30% of urban Italian children and only 5% of rural Italian children developed attachments to comfort objects. The interpretation of multiple studies suggests that child-rearing practices influence both the incidence of infants' attachment to inanimate objects and perhaps the choice of attachment objects.

== Common objects ==
Common comfort objects used by humans include: pacifiers; weighted blankets; worry beads; and good luck charms. In Japan, pillows are commonly used by Japanese youth as "security objects". Using crib cards (notes) during exams can be considered a comfort object for students.

== In popular culture ==
The term security blanket was popularized in the Peanuts comic strip created by Charles M. Schulz, who gave such a blanket to his character Linus van Pelt. Linus called it his "security and happiness blanket" in Good Grief, More Peanuts, printed in 1956. However, the concept of a comfort blanket existed prior to Peanuts. In a November, 1954 Daily Review article, writer "Bev" wrote about her daughter: "Security blanket. My younger child is one year old. When she finds a fuzzy blanket or a fleecy coat, she presses her cheek against it and sucks her thumb." Earlier, in the 1920s, in the USA, overblankets, which were clipped into babies’ cribs to stop the occupants falling out, were called security blankets.

== See also ==
- Comfort behavior in animals
- Poppet
