= Paula Heimann =

British German-born psychiatrist & psychoanalyst

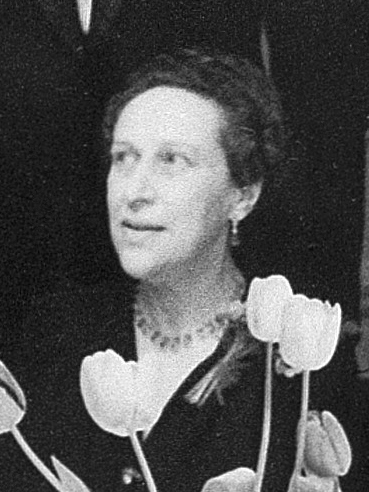
- Paula Heimann in 1952
- Born: 2 February 1899; Gdańsk, German Empire
- Died: 22 October 1982 (aged 83); London, United Kingdom
- Education: Heidelberg University
- Known for: Establishing the importance of countertransference in psychoanalysis
- Spouse: Franz Heimann (m. 1924 – 1933)
- Children: Mirza (b. 1925)
- Scientific career
- Fields: Psychiatry, psychoanalysis
- Thesis: Über atypische Eisenreaktionen bei progressiver Paralyse ("On atypical iron reactions in progressive paralysis") (1925)

Paula Heimann (née Klatzko; 2 February 1899 – 22 October 1982) was a German psychiatrist and psychoanalyst, who established the phenomenon of countertransference as an important tool of psychoanalytic treatment.

== Life in Germany ==
Born into a Jewish family which migrated from Russia, after studying medicine in Königsberg, Berlin, and Frankfurt, Paula Klatzko took and passed her Staatsexamen (state exams) in Breslau. There she met her future husband, the physician Franz Heimann. Together they went to Heidelberg where she trained to be a psychiatrist from 1924–1927. She wrote her doctoral dissertation in 1925. Their daughter Mirza was born that same year. In 1927, the Heimann family moved to Berlin, where she began her psychoanalytic training under Theodor Reik in 1929. Together with her husband she was a member of the International Society of Doctors Against War.

== Emigration and work in the United Kingdom ==
In 1933, Heimann's husband had to leave Germany because of his political views. He emigrated to Switzerland; however, Paula Heimann and her daughter were not permitted to do so. Thus mother and daughter emigrated to London.

In 1934 Heimann became Melanie Klein's secretary. In 1935 they started working together on analysis and became close associates. She passed the state medical examination in Edinburgh in 1938. That year she became a member of the British Psychoanalytical Society with her lecture A contribution to the problem of sublimation. Her article On counter-transference, presented at the Psychoanalytical Congress in 1949 in Zurich, led to a rift with the Kleinian group of analysts because she presented a different view of the importance of countertransference. Melanie Klein saw it only as a problem of the therapeutic process. Paula Heimann, however, saw the emotional reaction of the therapist to their patient as an important tool for the exploration of the latter's unconscious. She then turned to the Independents group and was Margarete Mitscherlich's analyst during 1958–59. Alexander Mitscherlich also underwent training analysis with her.

== Works ==
- Heimann, Paula (1950). "On countertransference". International Journal of Psychoanalysis. 31: 81–84. Archived from the original on 4 March 2016.
- About Children and Children-No-Longer, HG: Margaret Tonnesmann, Vol 10. In The New Library of Psychoanalysis, Published by Routledge (Taylor & Francis Group) 1990, ISBN 0-415-04119-8
- Bemerkungen zur Sublimierung ("Comments on sublimation"). In Psychologie des Ich ("Psychology of the self"), Wissenschaftliche Buchgesellschaft, Darmstadt 1974
