= The International Journal of Psychoanalysis =

- Discipline: Psychoanalysis
- Language: English
- Edited by: Francis Grier

Publication details
- History: 1920–present
- Publisher: Routledge
- Frequency: Bimonthly
- Impact factor: 1.2 (2023)

Standard abbreviations
- ISO 4: Int. J. Psychoanal.

Indexing
- CODEN: IJPSAA
- ISSN: 0020-7578 (print); 1745-8315 (web)
- LCCN: 21019534
- OCLC no.: 1640896

Links
- Journal homepage; Online access; Online archive (recent); Online archive (from 1920)

The International Journal of Psychoanalysis is a bimonthly peer-reviewed academic journal covering the field of psychoanalysis. The idea of the journal was proposed by Ernest Jones in a letter to Sigmund Freud dated 7 December 1918. The journal itself was established in 1920, with Jones serving as editor-in-chief until 1939. It incorporates the International Review of Psycho-Analysis, founded in 1974 by Joseph J. Sandler. It is run by the Institute of Psychoanalysis. Past editors have included Ernest Jones, James Strachey, Joseph Sandler, David Tuckett, and Dana Birksted-Breen. The current editor-in-chief is Francis Grier.

In 2013 the journal established the online open peer review, multi-language site IJP-Open. In 2023 this was expanded to also include information about the recommendations papers receive, as well as replies from authors and revised versions of papers. With the IJP Annuals, papers from the journal are selected each year and translated into eight different languages: French, German, Greek, Italian, Portuguese, Russian, Spanish, and Turkish.

According to the Journal Citation Reports, the journal has a 2023 impact factor of 1.2.

== See also ==
- International Psychoanalytical Association
- List of psychotherapy journals
- Internationale Zeitschrift für Psychoanalyse
