= Ronald Fairbairn =

Scottish psychiatrist and psychoanalyst (1889–1964)

Ronald Fairbairn FRSE
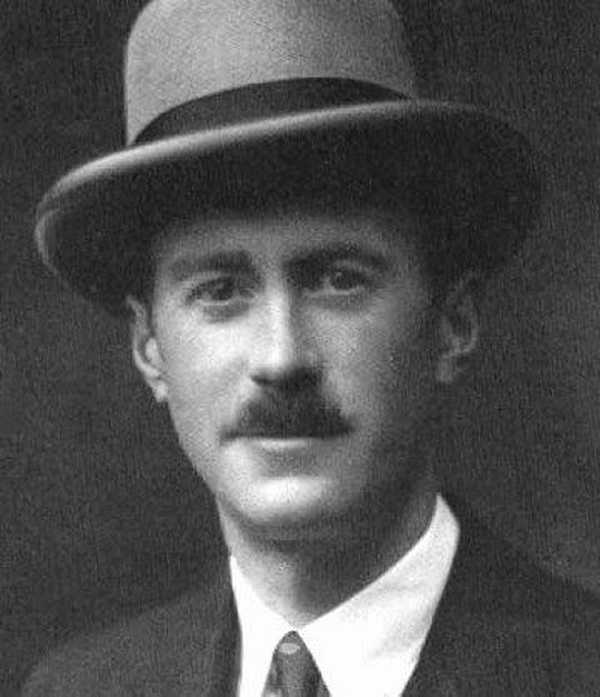
- Born: William Ronald Dodds Fairbairn; 11 August 1889; Morningside, Edinburgh, Scotland
- Died: 31 December 1964 (aged 75); Edinburgh, Scotland

Education
- Education: University of Edinburgh

Philosophical work
- School: Psychoanalysis
- Institutions: University of Edinburgh

William Ronald Dodds Fairbairn (/ˈfɛərbɛərn/; 11 August 1889 – 31 December 1964) was a Scottish psychiatrist, psychoanalyst and a central figure in the development of the object relations theory of psychoanalysis. He was generally known and referred to as "W. Ronald D. Fairbairn".

Fairbairn died in Edinburgh at the age of 75. He is buried with his wives in Dean Cemetery in western Edinburgh. The grave lies very close to the main east entrance and lodge-house.

== Early life and education ==
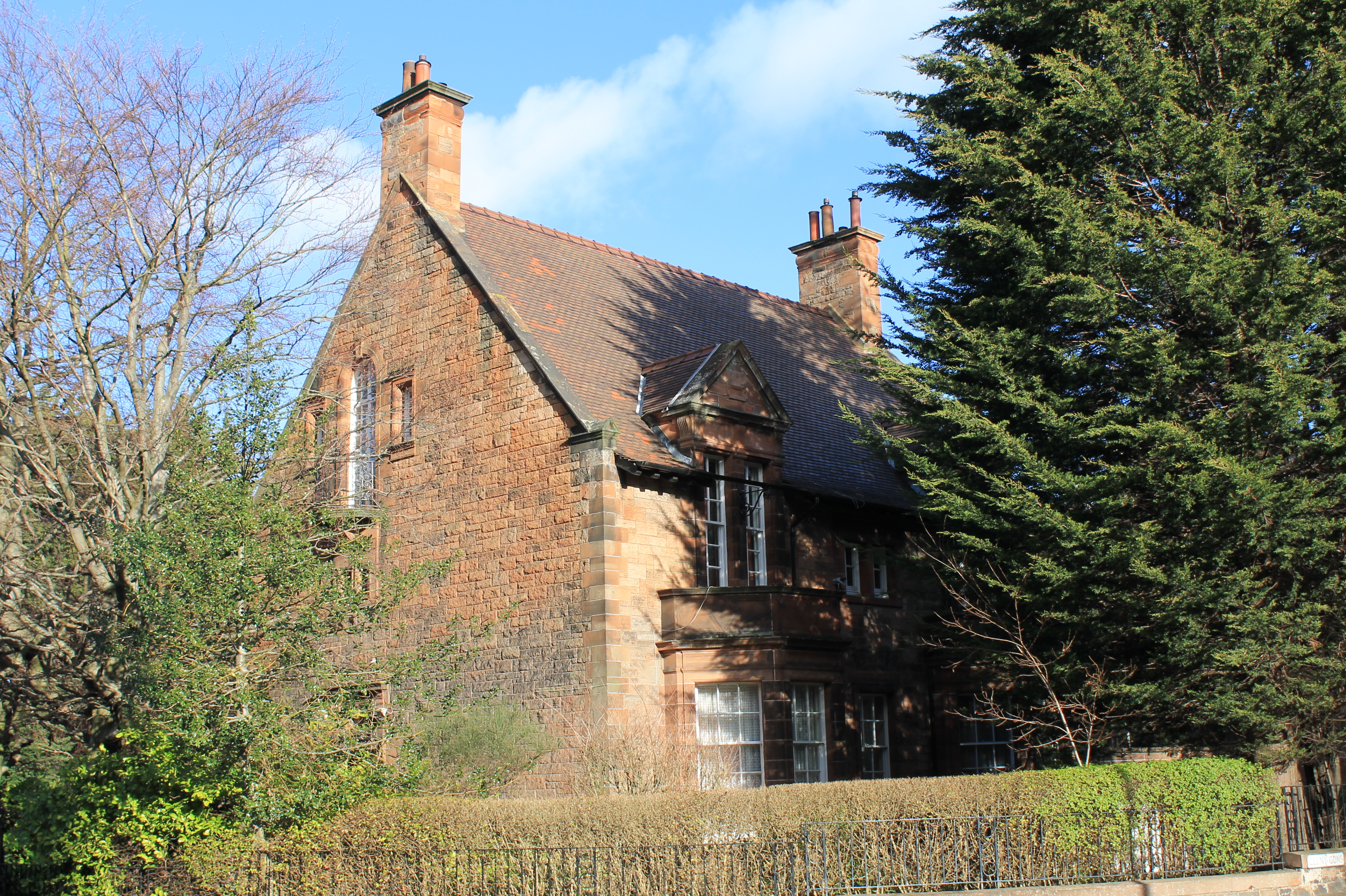
Fairbairn's birthplace - The Red House, Cluny Gardens

Ronald Fairbairn was born at the Red House, Cluny Gardens, in Morningside, Edinburgh in 1889, the only child of Cecilia Leefe and Thomas Fairbairn, a chartered surveyor, and president of the Edinburgh Architectural Association. He was educated at Merchiston Castle School and at the University of Edinburgh where he studied for three years in Divinity and Hellenic Greek studies, graduating with an MA in 1911.

In the First World War, he joined the Royal Engineers and served under General Allenby in the Palestinian campaign, and then the Royal Garrison Artillery.

On his return home, he began medical training, probably inspired by his war experience. He received a doctorate in Medicine (MD) on 30 March 1929 from the University of Edinburgh.

== Work ==
From 1927 to 1935, Fairbairn lectured in psychology at the University of Edinburgh whilst independently practising analysis.

In 1931, he was elected a Fellow of the Royal Society of Edinburgh. His proposers were James Drever, Edwin Bramwell, Sir Godfrey Hilton Thomson and Robert Alexander Fleming.

On the basis of his writings, he became an associate member of the British Psychoanalytical Society in 1931, becoming a full member in 1939. Fairbairn, though somewhat isolated in that he spent his entire career in Edinburgh, had a profound influence on British Object Relations and the relational schools. Fairbairn was one of the theory-builders for the Middle Group (now called the Independent Group) psychoanalysts. The Independent Group contained analysts who identified with neither the Kleinians nor the Anna Freudians. They were more concerned with the relationships between people than with the "drives" within them.

From 1941 until 1954 he was Consultant Psychiatrist to the Ministry of Pensions.

Fairbairn produced only one book-length collection of his papers called Psychoanalytic Studies of the Personality (1952) published in the United States as An Object-Relations Theory of the Personality by Basic Books in 1954.

Fairbairn's psychoanalytic model is significant because it challenged the overwhelmingly popular Freudian conception of the development of the human personality. Within the field of psychoanalysis it is grouped as a relational model, that assumes that development ocurrs according to the relationship patterns that the infant and child encounters within their family. Secondly, Fairbairn assumed that parental failures in empathy were the cause of later psychopatholgy and these failures were dissociated (forceably forgotten) by the infant or child and hidden in the unconscious. Finally, Fairbairn's model is grouped with other "developmental arrest" models (that include Sullivan and Kohut) as Fairbairn described the connection between parental emotional failures and lack of emotional development in the child. Despite its innovations, Fairbairn was chastized by his colleagues because his model contradicted many of the fundamental principles set down by Freud as central to the field of psychoanalysis.

== Personal life ==
In 1926, Fairbairn married Mary Ann More-Gordon, the daughter of Harry More-Gordon. Their daughter Ellinor was born in 1927, followed by twins in 1928, however, they did not survive. Their fourth child was born in 1929, and in 1933 their fifth son Nicholas was born, who would go on to become a barrister and MP.

In 1959, he married Marion Frances Mackintosh, daughter of Captain H. E. M. Archer.

== Bibliography ==
Collected papers:

- From Instinct to Self: Selected Papers of W. R. D. Fairbairn (1994) (a two-volume collection produced by Fairbairn's daughter Ellinor Fairbairn Birtles and David E. Scharff consisting of Fairbairn's earlier papers together with those published after 1952)
- James Grotstein and R. B. Rinsley, Fairbairn and the Origins of Object Relations (1994)

Biographies:

- John Derg Sutherland, Fairbairn’s Journey into the Interior (1989)

Commentary and application:

- Neil J. Skolnik's and David E. Scharff, Fairbairn Then and Now (1998) (an edited series of papers on Fairbairn's theory)
- Clarke and Scharff, Fairbairn and the Object Relations Tradition (2014)
- Seinfeld, The Bad Object (1990)
- Seinfeld, The Empty Core (1991)
- Celani, D. The Treatment of the Borderline Patient: Applying Fairbairn's Object Relations Theory in the Clinical Setting (1993)
- Celani, D. The Illusion of Love: Why the Battered Woman Returns to Her Abuser (1994) (an application of Fairbairn's model to domestic violence)
- Celani, D. Fairbairn's Object Relations Theory in the Clinical Setting (2010) (the application of Fairbairn's model to the treatment of severe personality disorders)
- Celani, D. Ronald Fairbairn: A Contemporaty Introduction (2024)
- Clarke, Graham S., An Introduction to Fairbairn’s Psychology of Dynamic Structure: The Analysis of Cultural Objects (2025)

== Sources ==
- Celani, David (2024). Ronald Fairbairn: A Contemporary Introduction (1st ed.). London: Routledge Books. ISBN 978-1-032-49348-0.
