= Horacio Etchegoyen =

Argentine psychoanalyst

- Born: January 13, 1919; Greater Buenos Aires, Argentina
- Died: July 2, 2016 (aged 97); Buenos Aires, Argentina
- Education: University of La Plata
- Occupation: Psychoanalyst
- Years active: 1940s–2016

Ricardo Horacio Etchegoyen (January 13, 1919 – July 2, 2016) was an Argentine psychoanalyst who was President of the International Psychoanalytical Association (IPA) in 1993-1997.

== Life and career ==
Etchegoyen was born in the Greater Buenos Aires area in 1919. His father, a physician, died when Etchegoyen was five months old. He studied at the Colegio Nacional de la Universidad Nacional de La Plata, a college preparatory school, and enrolled at the University of La Plata, earning a degree in medicine in 1948. During his university studies in the 1940s, he agitated for the university reform movement, which sought to strengthen secular education in Argentina. He was analyzed by Heinrich Racker, and began his psychoanalytic training in Argentina with Enrique Pichon Rivière, Marie Langer, León Grinberg, and José Bleger. Among his salient influences were the works of psychoanalyst Melanie Klein.

Etchegoyen practiced privately in La Plata, and taught at the National University of Cuyo from 1957 to 1965. Etchegoyen headed the Psychiatry Department at the university, and earned recognition from the World Health Organization during his tenure. He relocated to London in 1966, where he worked in the Adult Department of the famed Tavistock Clinic, where he received analysis from Donald Meltzer. He returned to Argentina within a year, and joined the Argentine Psychiatric Association, where from 1970, he provided advanced training to doctoral candidates in the field.

Etchegoyen was the first Latin American doctor to have the honor of being elected President of the IPA, and continued to practice and attend international conferences until 2008. Etchegoyen died in July 2016 at the age of 97.

== On psychoanalytic technique ==
'The book written by R. Horacio Etchegoyen, The Fundamentals of Psychoanalytic Technique (1991) Aperçu Karnac Books ed., New Ed, 2005, ISBN 1-85575-455-X, is undoubtedly a work of international standing, presented as it is in the form of a researched and well-written handbook which is easy both to read and to consult'.

In it Etchegoyen examines how 'psychoanalytic technique is influenced by the wide variety of theoretical points of view...throughout the world from Klein to Lacan...and he emphasises the advantages and disadvantages of the various approaches in the light of his own clinical experience'.

On the link between theory and practice, Etchegoyen wrote: "if you want to be rigorous in technique, sooner or later, you will run into the question of theory, because - as Freud stated - they are always coupled as a 'Junktim'" - one implies the other. Etchegoyen considered indeed that the 'permanent interaction of theory and technique is peculiar to psychoanalysis...[an] inextricable union'.

== On the Lacanians ==
Etchegoyen held discussions in Buenos Aires in 1996 with Jacques-Alain Miller, a prominent figure in the Lacanian movement. Etchegoyen invited Miller to the 1997 IPA Congress in Barcelona, where the latter's comments from the floor were greeted with warm applause.

Etchegoyen's capacity for bridge-building with the Lacanians had already been presaged by his Fundamentals, where he had discussed Lacanian concepts in an impartial and unpolemical way.

== Criticism ==
It has been suggested that 'Etchegoyen's (1991) influential book, The Fundamentals of Psychoanalytic Technique may be read as an attempt to work through his (often conflicted) feelings towards two major influences on his own professional development - Melanie Klein, his dominant theoretical inspiration, and Heinrich Racker, his first analyst and mentor', whose work on transference/countertransference stands as a precursor of intersubjective psychoanalysis: Etchegoyen's 'retreat to a conservative Kleinian "one-person psychology"' from Racker's influence would then appear as something of a retrograde step.

Etchegoyen's 'attention to certain similarities between the analysand's verbalization in the psychoanalytic process and Husserl's so-called eidetic reduction' shows however his continuing sensitivity to the phenomenological aspects of the patient/analyst interaction.

== Works ==
=== Books ===
- 1991 The Fundamentals of Phychoanalytic Technique

=== Papers ===
- 1960 Comments about the analysis of a psychopath
- 1969 The first psychoanalytic session
- 1970 Female Homosexuality: Dynamic aspects of the recovery
- 1973 A note on ideology and psychoanalytic technique
- 1976 The psychoanalytical "impasse" and the ego strategies
- 1977 Perversion of Transference. Theoretical and technical aspects
- 1978 Some thoughts on transference perversion
- 1978 The forms of transference
- 1979 Regression and Reframe
- 1979 Introduction to the Spanish version
- 1981 Notes to a history of the English school of psychoanalysis
- 1981 Validity of the transferential interpretation in the "here and now" for the reconstruction of the early psychic development
- 1981 Instances and alternatives of the interpretative work
- 1982 To Fifty years of the mutative interpretation
- 1983 Insight
- 1985 The interpretative styles
- 1988 Reflections on transference
- 1999 An essay on the psychoanalytical interpretation

== See also ==
- Ignacio Matte Blanco
