= Heinrich Racker =

Polish-Argentine psychoanalyst

Heinrich Noe Racker (born Hirsch Noach Rosenfeld; 3 July 1910 – 28 January 1961) was a Polish-Argentine psychoanalyst of Austrian-Jewish origin.

== Biography ==
Racker was born as the second of three children to Jewish parents in Nowy Sącz, Poland; his brother, Efraim Racker, was a famous biochemist. At the outbreak of World War I his family moved to Vienna, where Racker learned the piano, and worked as a lecturer at the Workers' Conservatory from 1929. Between 1929 and 1934 he studied psychology and philosophy with Hermann Swoboda, Karl Bühler and Moritz Schlick, as well as musicology and German studies, at the University of Vienna; Racker received a doctorate in psychology in 1935. He developed an interest in psychoanalysis during his university studies, which led him to begin training at the Vienna Psychoanalytic Society and enter into analysis with Jeanne Lampl-de Groot, a student of Sigmund Freud.

Racker was forced to flee Vienna with the Anschluss in 1939, and moved to Buenos Aires. There, he re-entered analysis: at first with Ángel Garma, while his later training analysis was with Marie Langer, a fellow refugee from Nazism. Racker completed his analytic training in 1946; he became an associate member of the Argentine Psychoanalytic Association (APA) the following year, and a teaching analyst in 1951. By 1960 he was director of the Institute of Psychoanalysis in Argentina, and in the process of founding a clinic within the APA.

Racker died in Buenos Aires in 1961, aged 50.

== Contributions ==
Racker paid much attention to the subjects of transference and countertransference, which he saw as central elements of the progress of analytic treatment; he viewed the relationship between them as an interactive symbiosis between analyst and patient, rather than just reactions. Rejecting the notion of the analyst as neutral and free from neurosis, he saw countertransference as a crucial way of approaching the patient's unconscious and achieving therapeutic change.

Racker delineated two distinct types of "countertransference identifications": a "concordant" identification, where the analyst effectively introjects the patient's id, ego and superego onto themselves; and a "complementary" identification, where the analyst identifies with the patient's internal object projected onto the analyst.

== Works ==
- "Contribution to Psychoanalysis of Music", American Imago 8:2 (1951), 129–163.
- "Observaciones sobre la contratransferencia como instrumento técnico", Revista de Psicoanálisis de la Asociacíon Psicoanalítica Argentina 9:3 (1952), 342–354. Translated into English as "Observations on Countertransference as a Technical Instrument", in Robert Oelsner (ed.), Transference and Countertransference Today, London and New York: Routledge, 2013.
- "A Contribution to the Problem of Countertransference", International Journal of Psycho-Analysis 34:4 (1953), 313–324.
- "Contribution to the Problem of Psycho-Pathological Stratification", International Journal of Psycho-Analysis 38:3–4 (1957), 223–239.
- Psicoanálisis del espíritu [Psychoanalysis of the Spirit], Buenos Aires: Nova, 1957
- "The Meanings and Uses of Countertransference", Psychoanalytic Quarterly 26:3 (1957), 303–357.
- "Counterresistance and Interpretation", Journal of the American Psychoanalytic Association 6:2 (1958), 215–221.
- Estudios sobre técnica psicoanalítica, Buenos Aires: Paidós, 1959. Translated into English as Transference and Countertransference, London: Hogarth Press, 1968. International Psycho-Analytical Library, no. 73.
- "Psychoanalytic Considerations on Music and the Musician", Psychoanalytic Review 52C:3 (1965), 75–94.
