= Langue sacrée, langue parlée =

- Theatrical release poster
- Directed by: Nurith Aviv
- Written by: Nurith Aviv
- Starring: Shimon Adaf; Orly Castel-Bloom; Yehuda Ovadia Fetaya; Haim Gouri; Prof. Dr. Michal Govrin; Dr. Roy Greenwald; Prof. Dr. Zali Gurevitch; Victoria Hanna; Etgar Keret; Dr. Yitzhak Laor; Ronit Matalon; Michal Na'aman; Prof. Dr. Haviva Pedaya
- Production companies: Les Films d'ici; Velvet Films
- Distributed by: Les Films d'ici
- Release date: 4 June 2008 (France)
- Running time: 73 Minutes
- Country: France
- Language: Hebrew

Langue sacrée, langue parlée (Hebrew: לשון קודש שפת חול, tr. Leshon Kodesh Sfat Chol, literally "Sacred Tongue, Profane Language") is a 2008 French independent underground experimental documentary art film directed by Nurith Aviv. It was released on DVD by Éditions Montparnasse, as part of a boxset, also including Misafa Lesafa (2004) and Traduire (2011).

== Synopsis ==
The film, the second in a trilogy, containing Misafa Lesafa (2004) and Traduire (2011), deals with what became of Hebrew, the sacred language of the Jews for two millennia, that became a living language on the creation of the State of Israel in 1948. The film continues the reflection begun in the director's previous film, Misafa Lesafa (2004), which films writers and artists recounting the conflicting relationship that they themselves experienced between their parents' language and the Hebrew language. It was screened more in France than in Israel.
