= From Language to Language =

2004 film by Nurith Aviv

Film poster

From Language to Language (Hebrew: משפה לשפה, tr. MiSafa LeSafa) is a 55-minute 2004 Belgian-French-German-Israeli Hebrew-language independent underground experimental documentary art film directed by Nurith Aviv.

== Synopsis ==
The film, produced by Marek Rozenbaum and the Dardenne brothers, was released on DVD by Éditions Montparnasse as part of a boxset also including 2008's Langue sacrée, langue parlée and 2011's Traduire, with which they form a trilogy. It contains interviews with Israeli artists and writers such as Aharon Appelfeld, Evgenia Dodina, Salman Masalha, Agi Mishol, Amal Murkus, Prof. Dr. Haviva Pedaya, Haïm Ulliel, and Meir Wieseltier who write in Hebrew even though it is not their native language about the importance of language and asks how the struggle between their mother tongue and Hebrew has affected their art.

== Reception ==
Between its release and 2006, the film was screened and won several awards at DocAviv, Marseille Festival of Documentary Film, Visions du Réel, Internationales Dokumentarfilmfestival München, Musée d’Art et d’Histoire du Judaïsme, Les 3 Luxembourg, Espace analytique, États généraux du film documentaire, Centre culturel international de Cerisy-la-Salle, Israel Psychoanalytic Society, Strasbourg Museum of Modern and Contemporary Art, Martin-Gropius-Bau, University of Lausanne, and many other places. The film was produced by ZDF, Arte, Noga Communications, New Fund for Cinema and Television, and Israel’s Channel 8. It was also screened at Centre Georges Pompidou in 2015.
