= Arminda Aberastury =

Argentine psycho-analyst

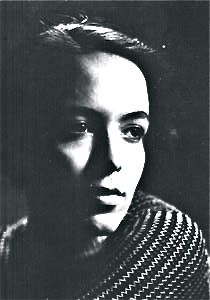
Arminda Aberastury

Arminda Aberastury de Pichón Rivière (1910–1972), known as La Negra, was an early Argentinian psychoanalyst.

She was born in Buenos Aires. Through her brother Frederico, who suffered from mental illness, she came to meet Enrique Pichon-Rivière, and married him in 1937. She joined a local, mostly European group interested in psychoanalysis.

Receiving a training analysis from Ángel Garma, one of the group, Arberastury then developed the analysis of children in the style of Melanie Klein and Sophie Morgenstern. She led a seminar on the area, 1948 to 1952, for the Argentinian Psychoanalytic Association. She committed suicide in 1972.
