= Enrique Pichon-Rivière =

Argentine psychiatrist

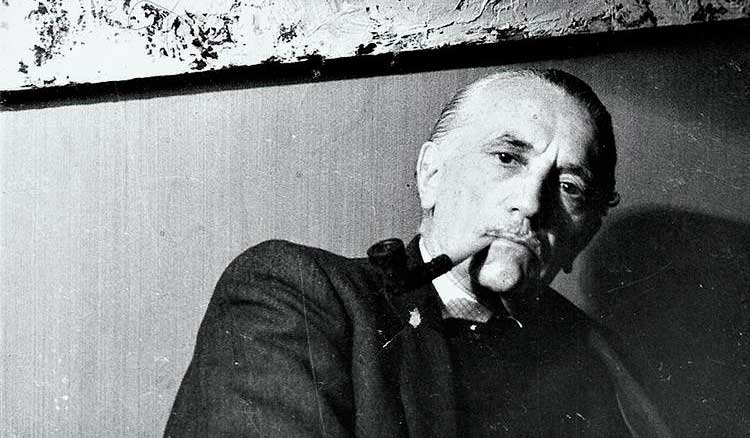
- Pichon-Rivière circa 1970.
- Born: June 25, 1907; Geneva, Switzerland
- Died: July 16, 1977 (aged 70); Buenos Aires, Argentina
- Occupations: Psychoanalytic Social psychologist, Psychiatrist

Enrique Pichon-Rivière (June 25, 1907 – July 16, 1977) was a Swiss-born Argentine psychiatrist, considered one of the introducers of group psychoanalysis in Argentina and generator of the group theory known as Grupo operativo (Operative Groups).

In the 1940s he became one of the founding members of the Asociación Argentina de Psicoanálisis (Argentine Psychoanalytic Association, or APA) and in the 1950s participated in the creation of the first private school of Social Psychology and the Instituto Argentino de Estudios Sociales (Argentine Institute of Social Studies, or IADES). The originality of his theory is based on the dialectical view of the functioning of the groups and the relationship between dialectic, homeostasis and cybernetic.

== Biography ==
Pichon-Rivière was born on June 25, 1907, in Geneva, Switzerland, his parents were French. His father had two daughters and three sons from a first marriage, when his wife died, he remarried his sister-in-law, first cousin of his dead wife. Enrique is the only one born of this marriage and, consequently, the youngest of the family. Both Alphonse and Josephine, his parents, disowned their bourgeois origins, embracing progressive ideas and a rebellious attitude to cultural norms of the time, both were fans of "rebel" poetry such as Rimbaud and Baudelaire, with strong socialist convictions and rejected racism and sexist stereotypes that prevailed at the start of the 20th century.

In 1910, his family went to Buenos Aires and later moved to Chaco. His father, who had been a soldier in the Military Academy of Saint-Cyr, was sent by his family to England to learn about the textile industry, then the family decided to move to Argentina, for reasons that Enrique Pichon-Rivière himself said he was unaware, and his father began to exploit land concessions granted by the Argentine State, where he tried to produce cotton, but without success. Thus, they had to move to Corrientes, a city on the Paraná River, with permanent flood and forest environment, a place where he spent his childhood. He was influenced by the Guarani culture, he had daily contact with the indigenous and their peasant modest lives. There, he learned to speak French first and then the Guaraní and Castilian.

When Enrique was 6 or 7 years old, he learned what he called "the great family secret": his brothers and sisters were actually his stepbrothers and stepsisters.

He attended high school in the city of Goya and, upon completion, he founded the Partido Socialista de Goya.

In 1924 he began his medical studies in the city of Rosario, ending in 1936 in the city of Buenos Aires. In Rosario he worked for a while as "instructor of manners" for sex workers of Polish origin in a brothel. Later he studied Anthropology, leaving the career to devote himself to psychiatry and to psychoanalysis.

He began his practice as a psychiatrist at the El Asilo de Torres (Tower Asylum), located in the vicinity of Luján, Buenos Aires. Later, he moved to Buenos Aires, where he would work in another sanatorium and as a journalist in the newspaper La Crítica ("The Critique") (1930–1931), in this period he became interested in poetry, paying particular attention to the French Poète maudit and Isidore Ducasse.

When he finished his studies, he began working at the Hospice of Mercy, now known as Interdisciplinary Psicoasistencial Hospital "Jose Tiburcio Borda", a place which played professionally for 15 years.

In the early 1940s, founded with Angel Garma, Celes Ernesto Carcamo, Marie Langer and Arnaldo Rascovsky, the Asociación Psicoanalítica Argentina (APA) (Argentine Psychoanalytic Association) of which then he would leave, becoming interested in the social aspect and activity of society groups, leading him to work at the Escuela de Psicología Dinámica (School of Psychology) of the then called Escuela de Psicología Social (School of social Psychology).

In 1937 he married the renowned psychoanalyst Arminda Aberastury, who was known for her friendship with his brother, Federico, and she was one of the members of the newly formed APA; Aberastury influenced the theories developed by Pichon-Rivière, given the expertise that she had accrued through the studies of Melanie Klein and Sophie Morgenstern methods.

In 1953 Enrique created the first private school of Social Psychology.

In 1955, together with Gino Germani and with the support of the Faculty of Economics, Institute of Statistics, Faculty of Philosophy and Psychology Department and the Faculty of Medicine at Rosario founded the Instituto Argentino de Estudios Sociales (Argentine Institute of Social Studies, or IADES), assuming the role of director.

In 1972, his wife Aberastury committed suicide due to a skin disease that had disfigured her, according to some people close to the family. Pichon-Riviere began a relationship with his former student and collaborator Ana Quiroga, whom he met in 1965.

== Bibliography consulted (by year of publication) ==
- Rambaut, Leo; Diccionario Crítico de Psicología Social, according to the theory of Dr. Enrique Pichon-Rivière, ed. del author, Buenos Aires, 2002, ISBN 987-43-3367-7.
- Pichon-Rivière, Enrique; Diccionario de Psicología Social, thematic compilation of writings by Pichon Rivière, Joaquín, and cols., ed. Nueva Visión, Buenos Aires, 1995.
- Zito Lema, Vicente; Entrevistas a PICHON-RIVIÈRE, Enrique; Conversaciones... sobre el arte y la locura, transcription of recordings, ed. Ediciones Cinco, Buenos Aires, 9ª, 1993.
- Pichon-Rivière, Enrique; El proceso creador, ed. Nueva Visión, Buenos Aires, 1987.
- Pichon-Rivière, Enrique; El proceso grupal, ed. Nueva Visión, Buenos Aires, 1999.
- Pichon-Rivière, Enrique y PAMPLIEGA de QUIROGA, Ana; Psicología de la vida cotidiana, ed. Nueva Visión, Buenos Aires, 1985.
- Pichon-Rivière, Enrique; Teoría del vínculo, thematic selection of transcripts of his lectures, years 1956/57, by TARAGANO, Fernando; ed. Nueva Visión, Buenos Aires, 1985.
- Pichon-Rivière, Enrique; La Psiquiatría, una nueva problemática, ed. Nueva Visión, Buenos Aires, 1983.
- ----. El Proceso Grupal, (Del psicoanálisis a la psicología Social, I), Buenos Aires, Ediciones Nueva Visión, 2001
- ----. Psicoanálisis del Conde de Lautrémont, Buenos Aires, Editorial Argonauta, Biblioteca de Psicoanálisis. 1992
