= Rangell =

Rangell may refer to:

People

- Bobby Rangell (b. c 1958), American jazz musician, Nelson Rangell's brother
- Johan Wilhelm Rangell (1894–1982), Finnish banker, prime minister
- Leo Rangell (1913–2011), American psychoanalyst
- Nelson Rangell (b. 1960), American jazz musician, Bobby Rangell's brother
