= Poétique du cerveau =

- DVD cover art
- Poetics of the Brain
- Directed by: Nurith Aviv
- Written by: Nurith Aviv
- Produced by: Serge Lalou; Farid Rezkallah; Itai Tamir
- Starring: Prof. Dr. François Ansermet; Nurith Aviv; Prof. Dr. Laurent Cohen; Prof. Dr. Yadin Dudai; Prof. Dr. Vittorio Gallese; Dr. Sharon Peperkamp; Prof. Dr. Noam Sobel
- Narrated by: Nurith Aviv
- Cinematography: Nurith Aviv; Sophie Cadet; Itai Marom
- Edited by: Amir Borenstein; Laure Saint-Marc
- Music by: Werner Hasler
- Production companies: 24 Images Production; Angoa-Association of International Collective Management of Audiovisual Works; Arte; Les Films d’ici; KTO; Laïla Films; Ministry of Culture and Sport’s Israel Film Council; Centre national du cinéma et de l’image animée; Procirep; Conseil régional des Pays de la Loire; Scam – Brouillon d’un rêve; Yahel Leon Recanati Foundation; Mifal HaPayis’s, Ministry of Culture and Sport’s Israel Film Council’s, and Tel Aviv-Yafo Municipality’s Yehoshua Rabinovich Foundation for the Arts, Tel Aviv; ZDF
- Distributed by: Margo Cinéma
- Release date: 2 December 2015 (Les 3 Luxembourg)
- Running time: 66 minutes
- Countries: France; Germany; Israel
- Languages: French; Hebrew; Italian

Poétique du cerveau (English: Poetics of the Brain) is a 66-minute 2015 French-German-Israeli French-, Hebrew-, and Italian-language independent underground experimental documentary art film directed by Nurith Aviv.

== Synopsis ==
Childhood photos from Nurith Aviv's family album evoke memories and reflections which lead her to encounters with researches in neuroscience. The film, released on DVD by Epicentre Films, weaves associative links between Aviv's personal biographical stories and interviews she conducts with neuroscientists about their work. These scientists, including Prof. Dr. Laurent Cohen, Prof. Dr. Yadin Dudai, Dr. Sharon Peperkamp, and Prof. Dr. Vittorio Gallese, discuss topics partly related to Aviv's previous films: memory, bilingualism, reading, mirror-neurons, smell, and traces of experience.

== Reception ==
The film, which includes music by Werner Hasler, was financed inter alia by Les Films d’ici, Angoa-Association of International Collective Management of Audiovisual Works, KTO, Conseil régional des Pays de la Loire, ZDF, Arte, Centre national du cinéma et de l’image animée, Procirep, Ministry of Culture and Sport's Israel Film Council, Mifal HaPayis, and Tel Aviv-Yafo Municipality's Yehoshua Rabinovich Foundation for the Arts. The film was screened at Les 3 Luxembourg in 2015 and 2016, at Centre Georges Pompidou in 2015, and at DocAviv, Tel Aviv Cinematheque, Arte, and Sderot Cinematheque’s Cinema South International Film Festival in 2016.
