= Mimí Langer =

Austrian-Argentine psychoanalyst (1910–1987)

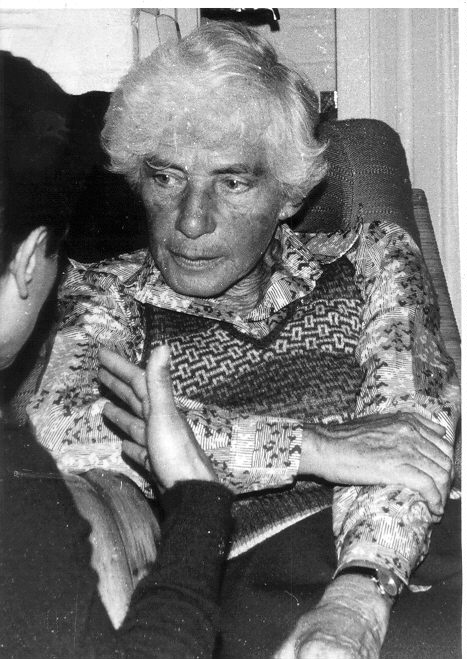
Marie "Mimí" Langer

Marie "Mimí" Lisbeth Langer (née Glass Hauser de Langer, German: [ˈlaŋɐ]; 31 August 1910 – 22 December 1987) was an Austrian-Argentine psychoanalyst and human rights activist. She was a cofounder of the Argentine Psychoanalytic Association.

== Biography ==
Langer was born into a well-off Jewish family in Vienna as the youngest of two daughters. Upon her own request to receive a formal education her parents allowed her to attend the Schwarzwaldschule, a reform school started by Eugenie Schwarzwald and influenced by feminist and social-democratic ideas. There she met fellow student Else Pappenheim; the latter would also become a well-known psychiatrist and neurologist, and the two remained lifelong friends.

Langer went on to study medicine at the University of Vienna. Motivated by the growing threat of nazism, she joined the Communist Party of Austria in 1932. After finishing her medical studies in 1935, Langer attended the Vienna Psychoanalytic Society and began her own psychoanalysis with Richard Sterba.

At the outbreak of the Spanish Civil War in 1936, Langer and her husband joined the International Brigades as medical personnel. The Anschluss then prevented them from returning to Austria; the Langers emigrated to Uruguay before settling in Buenos Aires, where Marie co-founded of the Argentine Psychoanalytic Association (APA) in 1942, together with Ángel Garma, Arnaldo Rascovsky, Enrique Pichon-Rivière, and others.

As an analyst, Langer sought to integrate Marxist and feminist ideas with psychoanalytical theory. One of her most notable works, Maternidad y sexo ("Motherhood and Sexuality") from 1951, mainly deals with issues such as mothering, sexuality, and career life in modern society. Langer herself suffered several miscarriages and lost a child at three days old, and went on to bear five children; her personal experiences influenced her writings on psychosomatic factors in pregnancy, miscarriage, and premature birth.

Langer's commitment to fusing psychoanalysis with a struggle for social change eventually caused her to leave the APA in 1969. After facing threats from the Argentine Anticommunist Alliance, Langer was once again forced into exile in 1974 and emigrated to Mexico City. There, she ran a private practice while teaching clinical psychology at the National Autonomous University of Mexico. She served as co-coordinator of the Internationalist Team of Mental Health Workers, Mexico-Nicaragua, and was also a co-founder of the Organization of Mental Health Workers.

Langer returned to Buenos Aires in 1987, where she died of cancer the same year.

== Bibliography ==
- "Antisemitismo, paranoia y el testamento del Dr. Ley", Revista de psicoanálisis de la Asociación psicoanalítica argentina, vol. 5, no. 1 (1947), pp. 93–99.
- Maternidad y sexo. Estudio psicoanalítico y psicosomático (Buenos Aires: Nova, 1951)
  - Motherhood and Sexuality, trans. Nancy Caro Hollander (New York: Guilford Press, 1992)
- Fantasías eternas a la luz del psicoanálisis (Buenos Aires: Nova, 1957)
- Psicoterapia del grupo. Su enfoque psicoanalítico, with León Grinberg and Emilio Rodrigué (Buenos Aires: Paidós, 1957)
- "Sterility and Envy", International Journal of Psychoanalysis, vol. 39 (1958), pp. 139–143.
- "Die 'Gestalt' einer Gruppe unfruchtbarer Frauen", Zeitschrift für psychosomatische Medizin, vol. 5 (1959), pp. 53–62.
- "Ideología e idealización", Revista de psicoanálisis de la Asociación psicoanalítica argentina, vol. 16, no. 4 (1959), pp. 417–422.
- "Psychoanalyse – in wessen Dienst?", Neues Forum, no. 28 (Sept./Oct. 1971), pp. 39–42.
