= Nurith Aviv =

French filmmaker

- נורית אביב
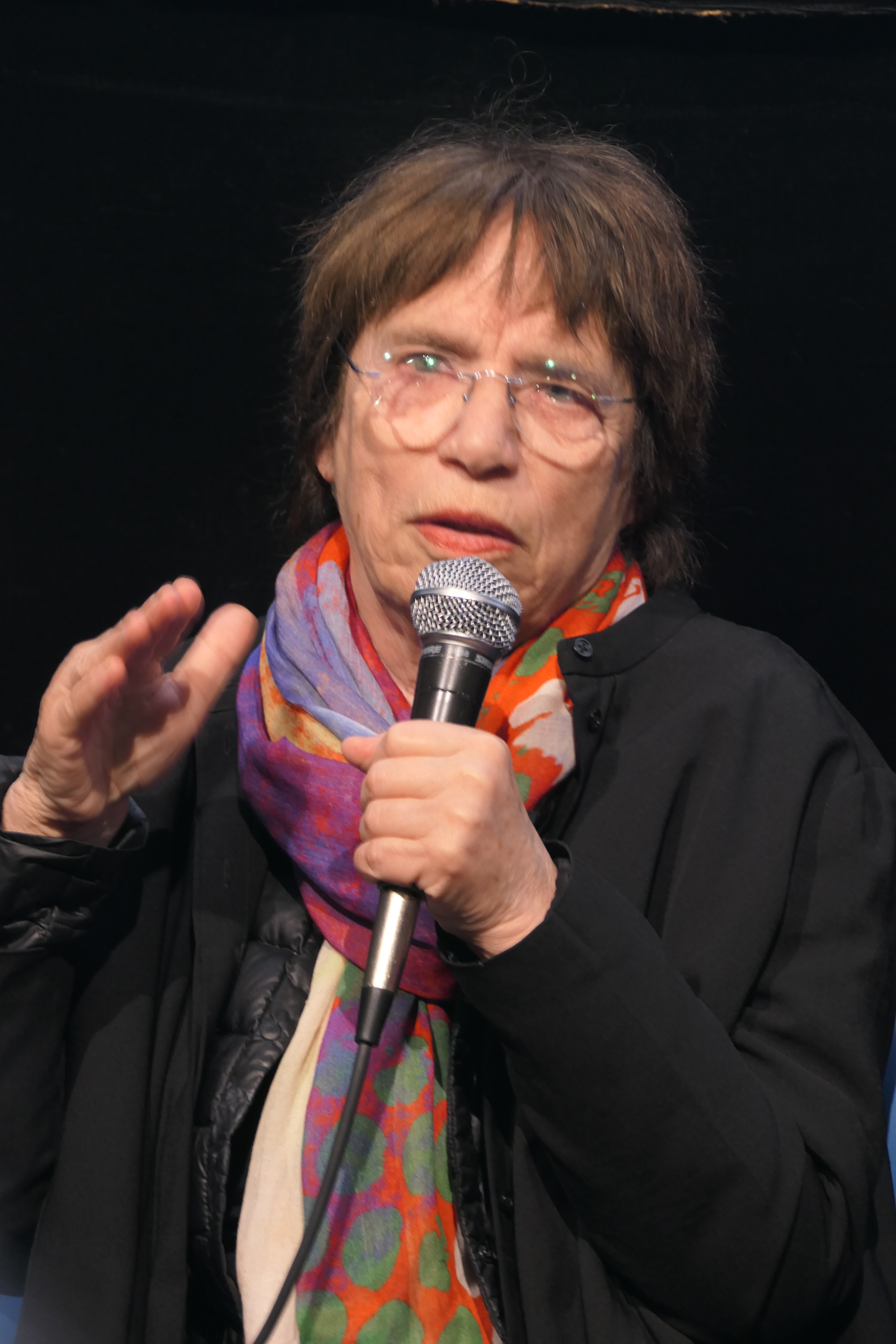
- Aviv speaking at a retrospective of her work in 2025
- Born: 11 March 1945 (age 80); Tel Aviv, Mandatory Palestine
- Occupations: Cinematographer, film director, writer
- Website: nurithaviv.free.fr

Nurith Aviv (Hebrew: נורית אביב) is a French film director and director of photography who was born 11 March 1945, in Tel Aviv (then in Mandatory Palestine).

== Biography ==
Nurith Aviv has directed fourteen documentary films, and the topic of language is central to her personal and cinematographic exploration.

Aviv was the first woman to be recognized as Director of Photography by the Centre national du cinéma et de l'image animée (CNC, the French National Center for Cinema and Animation), and has served as cinematographer for some one hundred feature and documentary films (for directors who include Agnès Varda, Amos Gitaï, René Allio and Jacques Doillon).

In 2019, Aviv was the recipient of the Grand Prix of the Académie Française (nominated by Amin Maalouf)

In 2015, a retrospective of her oeuvre titled "Filiation, Language, Place" was held at the Centre Pompidou in Paris, including 40 films for which she served as director or cinematographer.

was the winner of the 2009 Édouard Glissant Prize.

In 2008, a retrospective of her films took place at the Jeu de Paume.

Screenings of her latest films were held at Les 3 Luxembourgs Cinema, accompanied by numerous in-person and virtual discussions with writers, philosophers, psychoanalysts and literary critics.

== Filmography ==
| Year | Original title |
|---|---|
| 1989 | Kfar Qar'a, Israel |
| 1997 | Makom, Avoda |
| 2000 | Circumcision |
| 2001 | Allenby, passage |
| 2003 | Vaters Land/Perte |
| 2004 | From Language to Language |
| 2008 | Sacred Language, Spoken Language |
| 2011 | Translating |
| 2013 | Announcements |
| 2015 | Poetics of the Brain |
| 2017 | Signing in Languages |
| 2018 | Signing |
| 2020 | Yiddish |
| 2022 | Words That Remain |
