= Daniel Widlöcher =

French psychiatrist and academic (1929–2021)

- Born: 8 June 1929; Paris, France
- Died: 14 December 2021 (aged 92); Paris, France
- Occupations: Psychiatrist; Professor

Daniel Widlöcher (8 June 1929 – 14 December 2021) was a French psychiatrist and academic. He served as president of the International Psychoanalytical Association in 2001.

== Biography ==
Widlöcher was born into an Alsatian family in Paris. He started his career as a childhood psychiatrist at the Hôpital Ambroise Paré, directed by Jenny Aubry. He spent his military service in Algeria, serving an adult military hospital. Upon his return to Metropolitan France, he worked in neurology and psychiatry at Pitié-Salpêtrière Hospital. He then earned his medical license and a doctorate in psychology.

He became an assistant professor at the Pitié-Salpêtrière Hospital. He served as consulting assistant from 1959 to 1980 and was subsequently a clinical professor from 1980 to 1996. He was director of the psychopathology and pharmacology department at Inserm. He also held various positions at the French National Centre for Scientific Research. He worked in the Ministry of Health from 1983 to 1984.

Widlöcher became a psychoanalyst focused on childhood development. He carried out analyses alongside Jacques Lacan from 1953 to 1960. However, he later spoke out against Lacan's ideals, alleging that Lacan sought to be "the new Freud". Alongside Donald Winicott and Wladimir Granoff, he assisted in the foundation of the Association psychanalytique de France. He presided over the Association from 2001 to 2005. He was also President of the Association française de thérapie comportementale et cognitive from 1979 to 1980. He then chaired the teaching committee of the Association psychanalyse et psychothérapies. He received a Sigourney Award in 1998.

He died in Paris on 14 December 2021, at the age of 92.

== Publications ==
- L'interprétation des dessins d'enfants (1965)
- Freud et le problème du changement (1970)
- Les logiques de la dépression (1983)
- Métapsychologie du sens (1986)
- Les psychotropes, une manière de penser le psychisme? (1990)
- Traité de psychopathologie (1994)
- Les nouvelles cartes de la psychanalyse (1996)
- Sexualité infantile et attachement (2001)
- Le psychodrame chez l'enfant (2003)
- Psychanalyse et psychothérapie (2008)
- Comment on devient psychanalyste … et comment on le reste (2010)
- La dépression (1989)
- Actualité des modèles freudiens : langage, image, pensée (1995)
- La Psychanalyse en dialogue (2003)
- Les psychanalystes savent-ils débattre ? (2008)
- Conversations psychanalytiques (2017)
