= International Standard Audiovisual Number =

Unique identifier for audiovisual works

ISAN's logo

International Standard Audiovisual Number (ISAN) is a unique identifier for audiovisual works and related versions, similar to ISBN for books. It was developed within an ISO (International Organization for Standardization) TC46/SC9 working group. ISAN is managed and run by ISAN-IA.

== Overview ==
The ISAN standard (ISO standard 15706:2002 & ISO 15706-2) is recommended or required as the audiovisual identifier of choice for producers, studios, broadcasters, Internet media providers and video games publishers who need to encode, track, and distribute video in a variety of formats. It provides a unique, internationally recognized and permanent reference number for each audiovisual work and related versions registered in the ISAN system. The ISO 15706-2 is the ISO standard, an extension to the existing 2002 published standard ISO 15706:2002. The ISO 15706-2 is the Information and documentation ISAN Part 2: Version identifier.

ISO 15706-2:2007 specifies the basic systems and procedures to support the issuance and administration of V-ISANs.

ISAN identifies works throughout their entire life cycle from conception, to production, to distribution and consumption.

ISANs can be incorporated in both digital and physical media, such as theatrical release prints, DVDs, publications, advertising, marketing materials and packaging, as well as licensing contracts to uniquely identify works.

The ISAN identifier is incorporated in many draft and final standards such as AACS in Blu-rays and HD DVDs, DCI, MPEG, DVB, and ATSC. The identifier can be provided under descriptor 13 (0x0D) for Copyright identification system and reference within an ITU-T Rec. H.222 or ISO/IEC 13818 program.

== Number format ==
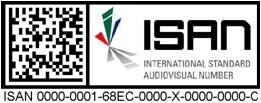
Example ISAN with two-dimensional barcode

The ISAN is a 12 byte block comprising three segments: a 6 byte root, a 2 byte episode or part, and a 4 byte version.

Length	Name	Type	Default
48 bits	isan_root	uimsbf	varies
16 bits	root_part	uimsbf	0
32 bits	part_version	uimsbf	1

uimsbf: unsigned integer, most significant bit first

A root is assigned to a core work by the ISAN-IA.

If a root has subsequent film parts (i.e., sequels) or television episodes then the root_part is incremented and started at a point defined by the producing studio. (i.e., relates to the production number)

If a root_part has been modified in some way—for example, dubbing, 24/30/25 frame conversions and subtitling the work into other languages—can have different versions. Common uses are when the native North American 30000/1001 frame version is set to one, the 25 frame conversion for PAL compatible markets is set to two.

When the 12 byte ISAN is represented in hexadecimal form it has 24 digits, for example: 000000018947000000000000. However, a printed ISAN designed for human reading always begins with the ISAN label, appears with hyphens to separate the number into more manageable groups of digits, and adds two check characters (alphanumeric) to help identify transcription errors. The resulting number appears as: ISAN 0000-0001-8947-0000-8-0000-0000-D

ISAN-IA has also developed a recommended practice for encoding the ISAN in a two-dimensional barcode 96 pixels square.

An ISAN is a centrally registered and permanently assigned reference number. The work or content it references is identified by a metadata set registered with ISAN-IA. Appointed Registration Agencies and ISAN-IA work together to prevent duplicate assignments of ISANs with the same metadata set. The ISAN metadata set includes the title (original and alternative), cast (director, actors, producer, screenwriter, etc...), type of works (movie, documentary, TV series or entertainment show, sport events, video games, etc...), duration, year of production and dozens of other fields related to the work. This metadata applies to all type of audiovisual works, including their related versions of trailers, excerpts, videos and broadcasts.

The Microsoft High Capacity Color Barcode will be used too.

== ISAN-IA ==
ISAN-IA (ISAN International Agency) is a Geneva-based non-profit association, founded in 2003, by AGICOA, CISAC, and FIAPF to run the ISAN standard.

ISAN-IA is in charge of:

- maintaining the ISAN central repository
- implementing, running and managing the ISAN system
- accrediting and appointing the ISAN registration agencies worldwide
- promoting with the help of the registration agencies, the ISAN standard to the audiovisual industry.
