= Leo Rangell =

American psychoanalyst

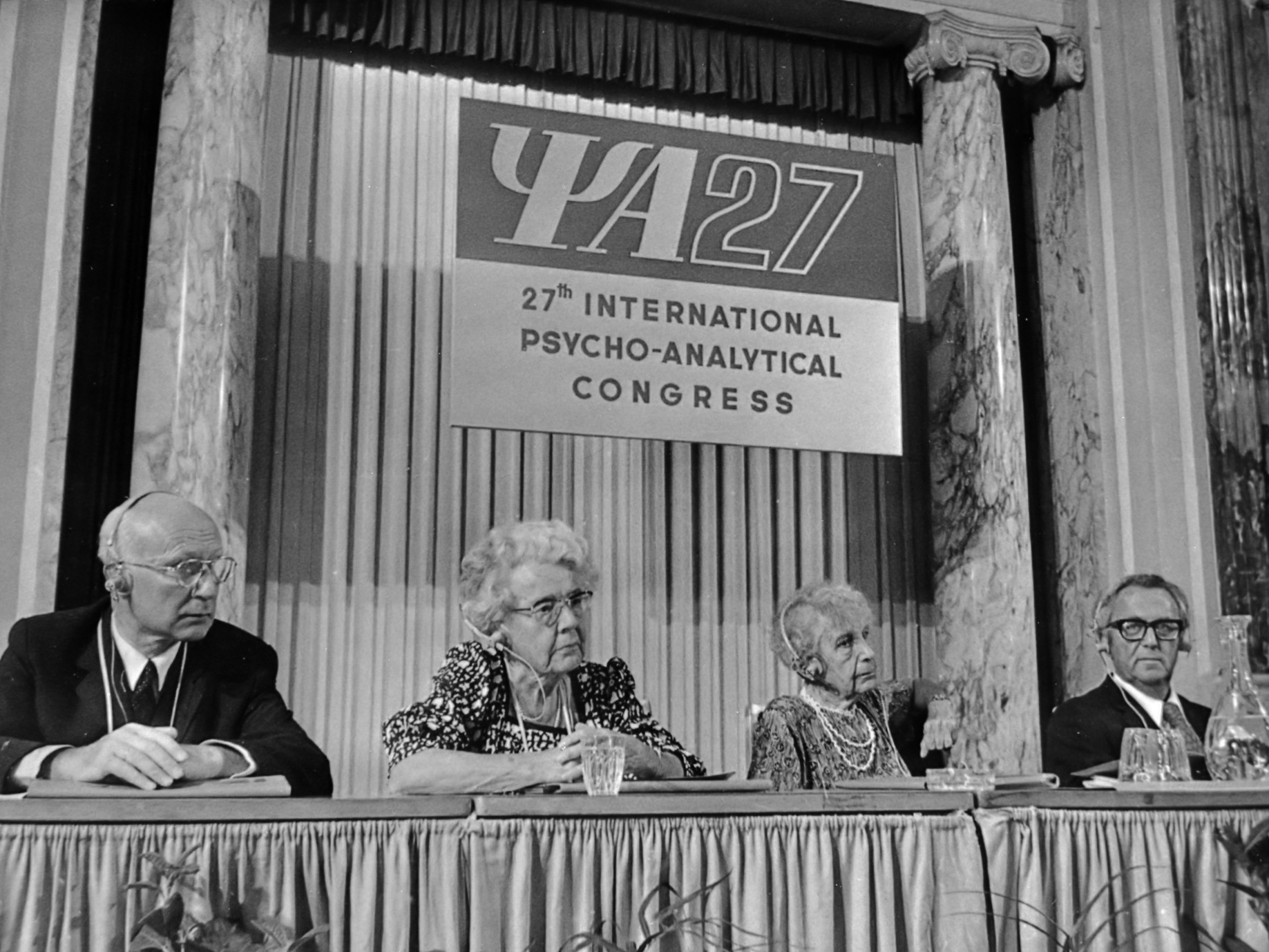
Left to right: Van de Leeuw, dr. Jeanne Lampl-de Groot, dr. Anna Freud and dr. Leo Rangell (1971)

Leo Rangell (October 1, 1913 – May 28, 2011) was an American psychoanalyst and clinical professor of psychiatry at the University of California, Los Angeles. He was also twice president of the International Psychoanalytical Association and the American Psychoanalytic Association, and was accorded the title "Honorary President" in 1997. Rangell died May 28, 2011, at the Ronald Reagan UCLA Medical Center in Los Angeles. He was 97.

== Biography ==
Rangell was born in Brooklyn, New York, October 1, 1913, to parents who had recently immigrated from Eastern Europe. He graduated from Boys High School and became a premed student at Columbia University (BS with honors, 1933). He completed medical school at the University of Chicago in 1937.

== Notable publications ==
- The Mind of Watergate (1980)
- My Life in Theory (2004)
- The Road to Unity in Psychoanalytic Theory (2006)
