= Stress (linguistics) =

Linguistic emphasis on syllables or words

Primary stress

ˈ◌
- IPA number: 501

Encoding
- Entity (decimal): &#712;
- Unicode (hex): U+02C8

Secondary stress

ˌ◌
- IPA number: 502

Encoding
- Entity (decimal): &#716;
- Unicode (hex): U+02CC

In linguistics, and particularly phonology, stress or accent is the relative emphasis or prominence given to a certain syllable in a word or to a certain word in a phrase or sentence. That emphasis is typically caused by such properties as increased loudness and vowel length, full articulation of the vowel, and changes in tone. The terms stress and accent are often used synonymously in that context but are sometimes distinguished. For example, when emphasis is produced through pitch alone, it is called pitch accent, and when produced through length alone, it is called quantitative accent. When caused by a combination of various intensified properties, it is called stress accent or dynamic accent; English uses what is called variable stress accent.

Since stress can be realised through a wide range of phonetic properties, such as loudness, vowel length, and pitch (which are also used for other linguistic functions), it is difficult to define stress solely phonetically.

The stress placed on syllables within words is called word stress. Some languages have fixed stress, meaning that the stress on virtually any multisyllable word falls on a particular syllable, such as the penultimate (e.g. Polish) or the first (e.g. Finnish). Other languages, like English and Russian, have lexical stress, where the position of stress in a word is not predictable in that way but lexically encoded. Sometimes more than one level of stress, such as primary stress and secondary stress, may be identified.

Stress is not necessarily a feature of all languages: some, such as French and Mandarin Chinese, are sometimes analyzed as lacking lexical stress entirely.

The stress placed on words within sentences is called sentence stress or prosodic stress. That is one of the three components of prosody, along with rhythm and intonation. It includes phrasal stress (the default emphasis of certain words within phrases or clauses), and contrastive stress (used to highlight an item, a word or part of a word, that is given particular focus).

== Phonetic realization ==
There are various ways in which stress manifests itself in the speech stream, and they depend to some extent on which language is being spoken. Stressed syllables are often louder than non-stressed syllables, and they may have a higher or lower pitch. They may also sometimes be pronounced longer. There are sometimes differences in place or manner of articulation. In particular, vowels in unstressed syllables may have a more central (or "neutral") articulation, and those in stressed syllables have a more peripheral articulation. Stress may be realized to varying degrees on different words in a sentence; sometimes, the difference is minimal between the acoustic signals of stressed and those of unstressed syllables.

Those particular distinguishing features of stress, or types of prominence in which particular features are dominant, are sometimes referred to as particular types of accent: dynamic accent in the case of loudness, pitch accent in the case of pitch (although that term usually has more specialized meanings), quantitative accent in the case of length, and qualitative accent in the case of differences in articulation. They can be compared to the various types of accents in music theory. In some contexts, the term stress or stress accent specifically means dynamic accent (or as an antonym to pitch accent in its various meanings).

A prominent syllable or word is said to be accented or tonic; the latter term does not imply that it carries phonemic tone. Other syllables or words are said to be unaccented or atonic. Syllables are frequently said to be in pretonic or post-tonic position, and certain phonological rules apply specifically to such positions. For instance, in American English, /t/ and /d/ are flapped in post-tonic position.

In Mandarin Chinese, which is a tonal language, stressed syllables have been found to have tones that are realized with a relatively large swing in fundamental frequency, and unstressed syllables typically have smaller swings. (See also Stress in Standard Chinese.)

Stressed syllables are often perceived as being more forceful than non-stressed syllables.

== Word stress ==
Word stress, or sometimes lexical stress, is the stress placed on a given syllable in a word. The position of word stress in a word may depend on certain general rules applicable in the language or dialect in question, but in other languages, it must be learned for each word, as it is largely unpredictable, for example in English. For instance, in English, stress falls on the middle syllable in the word projector but on the first syllable in the word property. In some cases, classes of words in a language differ in their stress properties; for example, loanwords into a language with fixed stress may preserve stress placement from the source language, or the special pattern for Turkish placenames.

=== Non-phonemic stress ===
In some languages, the placement of stress can be determined by rules. It is thus not a phonemic property of the word, because it can always be predicted by applying the rules.

Languages in which the position of the stress can usually be predicted by a simple rule are said to have fixed stress. For example, in Czech, Finnish, Icelandic, Hungarian and Latvian, the stress almost always comes on the first syllable of a word. In Armenian the stress is on the last syllable of a word. In Quechua, Esperanto, and Polish, the stress is almost always on the penult (second-last syllable). In Macedonian, it is on the antepenult (third-last syllable).

Other languages have stress placed on different syllables but in a predictable way, as in Classical Arabic and Latin, where stress is conditioned by the weight of particular syllables. They are said to have a regular stress rule.

Statements about the position of stress are sometimes affected by the fact that when a word is spoken in isolation, prosodic factors (see below) come into play, which do not apply when the word is spoken normally within a sentence. French words are sometimes said to be stressed on the final syllable, but that can be attributed to the prosodic stress, which is placed on the last syllable (unless it is a schwa in which case the stress is placed on the second-last syllable) of any string of words in that language. Thus, it is on the last syllable of a word analyzed in isolation. The situation is similar in Mandarin Chinese. French and Georgian (and, according to some authors, Mandarin Chinese) can be considered to have no real lexical stress.

=== Phonemic stress ===
With some exceptions above, languages such as Germanic languages, Romance languages, the East and South Slavic languages, Lithuanian, Greek, as well as others, such as Northwest Caucasian, Semitic and Turkic languages, in which the position of stress in a word is not fully predictable, are said to have phonemic stress. Stress in these languages is usually truly lexical and must be memorized as part of the pronunciation of an individual word. In some languages, such as Spanish, Portuguese, Catalan, Lakota and, to some extent, Italian, stress is even represented in writing using diacritical marks, for example in the Spanish words célebre and celebré. Sometimes, stress is fixed for all forms of a particular word, or it can fall on different syllables in different inflections of the same word.

In such languages with phonemic stress, the position of stress can serve to distinguish otherwise identical words. For example, the English words insight (/ˈɪnsaɪt/) and incite (/ɪnˈsaɪt/) are distinguished in pronunciation only by the fact that the stress falls on the first syllable in the former and on the second syllable in the latter. Examples from other languages include German Tenor ([ˈteːnoːɐ̯] 'gist of message' vs. [teˈnoːɐ̯] 'tenor voice'); and Italian ancora ([ˈaŋkora] 'anchor' vs. [aŋˈkoːra] 'more, still, yet, again').

In many languages with lexical stress, it is connected with alternations in vowels and/or consonants, which means that vowel quality differs by whether vowels are stressed or unstressed. There may also be limitations on certain phonemes in the language in which stress determines whether they are allowed to occur in a particular syllable or not. That is the case with most examples in English and occurs systematically in Russian, such as за́мок ([ˈzamək], 'castle') vs. замо́к ([zɐˈmok], 'lock'); and in Portuguese, such as the triplet sábia ([ˈsaβjɐ], 'wise woman'), sabia ([sɐˈβiɐ], 'knew'), sabiá ([sɐˈβja], 'thrush').

Dialects of the same language may have different stress placement. For instance, the English word laboratory is stressed on the second syllable in British English (labóratory often pronounced "labóratry", the second o being silent), but the first syllable in American English, with a secondary stress on the "tor" syllable (láboratory often pronounced "lábratory"). The Spanish word video is stressed on the first syllable in Spain (vídeo) but on the second syllable in the Americas (video). The Portuguese words for Madagascar and the continent Oceania are stressed on the third syllable in European Portuguese (Madagáscar and Oceânia), but on the fourth syllable in Brazilian Portuguese (Madagascar and Oceania).

=== Compounds ===
With very few exceptions, English compound words are stressed on their first component. Even the exceptions, such as mankínd, are instead often stressed on the first component by some people or in some kinds of English. The same components as those of a compound word are sometimes used in a descriptive phrase with a different meaning and with stress on one or both words, but that descriptive phrase is then not usually considered a compound. Examples include bláck bírd (any bird that is black) versus bláckbird (a specific bird species), táilbone (the coccyx) versus táil bóne (any bone found in the tail of an animal), and páper bág (a bag made of paper) versus páper bag (a bag for carrying documents) versus páperbag (a bag for carrying newspapers).

=== Levels of stress ===
Some languages are described as having both primary stress and secondary stress. A syllable with secondary stress is stressed relative to unstressed syllables but not as strongly as a syllable with primary stress. As with primary stress, the position of secondary stress may be more or less predictable depending on language. In English, it is not fully predictable, but the different secondary stress of the words organization and accumulation (on the first and second syllable, respectively) is predictable due to the same stress of the verbs órganize and accúmulate. In some analyses, for example the one found in Chomsky and Halle's The Sound Pattern of English, English has been described as having four levels of stress: primary, secondary, tertiary, and quaternary, but the treatments often disagree with one another.

Peter Ladefoged and other phoneticians have noted that it is possible to describe English with only one degree of stress, as long as prosody is recognized and unstressed syllables are phonemically distinguished for vowel reduction. They find that the multiple levels posited for English, whether primary–secondary or primary–secondary–tertiary, are not phonetic stress (let alone phonemic), and that the supposed secondary/tertiary stress is not characterized by the increase in respiratory activity associated with primary/secondary stress in English and other languages. (For further detail see Stress and vowel reduction in English.)

=== Terminology ===
An oxytone is a word with either stress (in stress-based languages) or a high accent (in languages with a pitch accent) on the ultimate syllable (that is, the last syllable). Examples of this in English are the words correct and reward.

A paroxytone is a word with either stress (in stress-based languages) or a high accent (in languages with a pitch accent) on the penultimate syllable (that is, the second-to-last syllable). An example of this in English is the word potato. In English, most words ending in -ic are paroxytones: músic, frántic, and phonétic but not rhétoric, aríthmetic (noun), and Árabic. In Italian and Portuguese as well as Spanish, most words are paroxytones. In Polish, almost all multisyllabic words are paroxytones except for certain verb conjugations and a few words of foreign origin. In medieval Latin lyric poetry, a paroxytonic line or half-line is one in which the penultimate syllable is stressed, as in the second half of the verse "Estuans intrinsecus || ira vehementi."

A proparoxytone is a word with either stress (in stress-based languages) or a high accent (in languages with a pitch accent) on the antepenultimate syllable (that is, the third-to-last syllable). Examples of this in English are the words words "cinema" and "operational". In English, most nouns of three or more syllables are proparoxytones, except in words ending in –tion or –sion, which tend to be paroxytones (operation, equivocation). This tendency is so strong in English that it frequently leads to the stress on derived words being on a different part of the root. For example, the root photograph gives rise to the nouns photography and photographer, family → familiar and familial. (In many dialects of English, the i in family is even deleted entirely, and still has the stress in familial and familiar.) In medieval Latin lyric poetry, a proparoxytonic line or half-line is one where the antepenultimate syllable is stressed, as in the first half of the verse "Estuans intrinsecus || ira vehementi."

In Ancient Greek grammar, a barytone is a word without any accent on the last syllable. Words with an acute or circumflex on the second-to-last or third-from-last syllable are barytones, as well as words with no accent on any syllable:

- τις 'someone' (unaccented)
- ἄνθρωπος 'person' (proparoxytone)
- μήτηρ 'mother' (paroxytone)
- μοῦσα 'muse' (properispomenon)

== Prosodic stress ==
Extra stress

ˈˈ◌

Prosodic stress, or sentence stress, refers to stress patterns that apply at a higher level than the individual word – namely within a prosodic unit. It may involve a certain natural stress pattern characteristic of a given language, but may also involve the placing of emphasis on particular words because of their relative importance (contrastive stress).

An example of a natural prosodic stress pattern is that described for French above; stress is placed on the final syllable of a string of words (or if that is a schwa, the next-to-final syllable). A similar pattern is found in English (see § Levels of stress above): the traditional distinction between (lexical) primary and secondary stress is replaced partly by a prosodic rule stating that the final stressed syllable in a phrase is given additional stress. (A word spoken alone becomes such a phrase, hence such prosodic stress may appear to be lexical if the pronunciation of words is analyzed in a standalone context rather than within phrases.)

Another type of prosodic stress pattern is quantity sensitivity – in some languages additional stress tends to be placed on syllables that are longer (moraically heavy).

Prosodic stress is also often used pragmatically to emphasize (focus attention on) particular words or the ideas associated with them. Doing this can change or clarify the meaning of a sentence; for example:

I didn't take the test yesterday. (Somebody else did.)
I didn't take the test yesterday. (I did not take it.)
I didn't take the test yesterday. (I did something else with it.)
I didn't take the test yesterday. (I took one of several, or I didn't take the specific test that would have been implied.)
I didn't take the test yesterday. (I took something else.)
I didn't take the test yesterday. (I took it some other day.)

As in the examples above, stress is normally transcribed as italics in printed text or underlining in handwriting.

In English, stress is most dramatically realized on focused or accented words. For instance, consider the dialogue

"Is it brunch tomorrow?"
"No, it's dinner tomorrow."

In it, the stress-related acoustic differences between the syllables of tomorrow would be small compared to the differences between the syllables of dinner, the emphasized word. In these emphasized words, stressed syllables such as din in dinner are louder and longer. They may also have a different fundamental frequency, or other properties.

The main stress within a sentence, often found on the last stressed word, is called the nuclear stress.

== Stress and vowel reduction ==
In many languages, such as Russian and English, vowel reduction may occur when a vowel changes from a stressed to an unstressed position. In English, unstressed vowels may reduce to schwa-like vowels, though the details vary with dialect (see stress and vowel reduction in English). The effect may depend on lexical stress—for example, the unstressed first syllable of the word photographer may contain a schwa (/fəˈtɒɡrəfər/), whereas the stressed first syllable of photograph never does (/ˈfoʊtəˌɡræf -ɡrɑːf/). It may also depend on prosodic stress—for example, the word "to" is pronounced with a schwa when it is unstressed within a sentence, but not when it is stressed.

Many other languages, such as Finnish and the mainstream dialects of Spanish, do not have unstressed vowel reduction; in these languages vowels in unstressed syllables have nearly the same quality as those in stressed syllables.

== Stress and rhythm ==
Some languages, such as English, are said to be stress-timed languages; that is, stressed syllables appear at a roughly constant rate and non-stressed syllables are shortened to accommodate that, which contrasts with languages that have syllable timing (e.g. Spanish) or mora timing (e.g. Japanese), whose syllables or moras are spoken at a roughly constant rate regardless of stress.

== Historical effects ==
It is common for stressed and unstressed syllables to behave differently as a language evolves. For example, in the Romance languages, the original Latin short vowels /e/ and /o/ have often become diphthongs when stressed. Since stress takes part in verb conjugation, that has produced verbs with vowel alternation in the Romance languages. For example, the Spanish verb volver (to return, come back) has the form volví in the past tense but vuelvo in the present tense (see Spanish irregular verbs). Italian shows the same phenomenon but with /o/ alternating with /uo/ instead. That behavior is not confined to verbs; note for example Spanish viento 'wind' from Latin ventum, or Italian fuoco 'fire' from Latin focum. There are also examples in French, though they are less systematic : viens from Latin venio where the first syllable was stressed, vs venir from Latin venire where the main stress was on the penultimate syllable.

== Stress "deafness" ==
An operational definition of word stress may be provided by the stress "deafness" paradigm first developed by Dupoux, Peperkamp & Sebastián-Gallés (2001). The idea is that if listeners perform poorly on reproducing the presentation order of series of stimuli that minimally differ in the position of phonetic prominence (e.g. [númi]/[numí]), the language does not have word stress. The task involves a reproduction of the order of stimuli as a sequence of key strokes, whereby key "1" is associated with one stress location (e.g. [númi]) and key "2" with the other (e.g. [numí]). A trial may be from two to six stimuli in length. Thus, the order [númi-númi-numí-númi] is to be reproduced as "1121". It was found that listeners whose native language was French performed significantly worse than Spanish listeners in reproducing the stress patterns by key strokes. The explanation is that Spanish has lexically contrastive stress, as evidenced by the minimal pairs like topo ('mole') and topó ('[he/she/it] met'), while in French, stress does not convey lexical information and there is no equivalent of stress minimal pairs as in Spanish.

An important case of stress "deafness" relates to Persian. The language has generally been described as having contrastive word stress or accent as evidenced by numerous stem and stem–clitic minimal pairs such as /mɒhi/ [mɒ.hí] ('fish') and /mɒh-i/ [mɒ́.hi] ('some month'). The authors argue that the reason why Persian listeners are "stress-deaf" is that their accent locations arise postlexically. Persian thus lacks stress in the strict sense.

Stress "deafness" has been studied for a number of languages, such as Polish and French learners of Spanish.

== Spelling and notation for stress ==
The orthographies of some languages include devices for indicating the position of lexical stress. Some examples are listed below:

- In Modern Greek, polysyllabic words are written with an acute accent (´) on the vowel of the stressed syllable. The accent is also used to distinguish some homographs.
- In Spanish orthography, stress is notated with a single acute accent on a vowel when it is not predictable. If a word is written without an accent mark, the stress is on the penult if the last letter is a vowel, n, or s, but on the final syllable if the word ends in any other letter or a consonant cluster. Thus stressed antepenultimate syllables are accented, as in árabe. Stressed final syllables are accented when the word ends in a vowel, n, or s (not in a consonant cluster), as in está. Stressed penultimate syllables are accented when the word ends in any other letter, as in cárcel. The accent is also used to distinguish some homographs.
- Catalan and Valencian orthographies use the acute and grave accents to mark both stress and vowel quality. An acute on ⟨é ó⟩ indicates that the vowel is stressed and close-mid (/e o/), while grave on ⟨è ò⟩ indicates that the vowel is stressed and open-mid (/ɛ ɔ/). Grave on ⟨à⟩ and acute on ⟨í ú⟩ simply indicate that the vowels are stressed. Thus, the acute is used on close or close-mid vowels, and the grave on open or open-mid vowels.
- In Filipino orthography (which also applies to other Philippine languages), an acute accent is used to distinguish similar words with distinct definitions. The position of the stress may occur in first, middle or final syllable of a word. Stress that occurs in the first syllable serves as the default word and is usually left unwritten e.g. pito ('whistle') which distinguishes from pitó ('seven'). Diacritics in Modern Tagalog and other Philippine languages are rarely used in writing, cases of which the diacritical marks are used can only be seen in formal and academic setting. Vowels with an acute accent are not included in the Filipino alphabet, possible combinations include: á,é,í,ó and ú.
- In Portuguese, stress is sometimes indicated explicitly with an acute accent (for i, u, and open a, e, o), or circumflex (for close a, e, o). The orthography has an extensive set of rules that describe the placement of diacritics, based on the position of the stressed syllable and the surrounding letters.
- In Italian, the grave accent is used in words ending with an accented vowel, e.g. città, 'city', and to distinguish monosyllabic homographs like là ('there') and la ('the'). It is optional if there is a possibility of misunderstanding, such as condomìni ('condominiums') and condòmini ('joint owners'). The acute and grave accents are rarely used otherwise. The acute on ⟨é⟩ and ⟨ó⟩ represents stressed close-mid vowels. Since final ⟨o⟩ is hardly ever close-mid, ⟨ó⟩ is rarely encountered (e.g. metró 'subway'). In didactic texts, the accents differentiate minimal pairs (for example pèsca 'peach' vs. pésca 'fishing').
- Maltese orthography indicates stress with grave accent in words ending with an accented vowel.

Though not part of normal orthography, a number of devices exist that are used by linguists and others to indicate the position of stress (and syllabification in some cases) when it is desirable to do so. Some of these are listed here.

- Most commonly, the stress mark is placed before the beginning of the stressed syllable, where a syllable is definable. However, it is occasionally placed immediately before the vowel. In the International Phonetic Alphabet (IPA), primary stress is indicated by a high vertical line (primary stress mark: ˈ) before the stressed element, secondary stress by a low vertical line (secondary stress mark: ˌ). For example, [sɪˌlæbəfɪˈkeɪʃən] or /sɪˌlæbəfɪˈkeɪʃən/. Extra stress can be indicated by doubling the symbol: ˈˈ◌.
- Linguists frequently mark primary stress with an acute accent over the vowel, and secondary stress by a grave accent. Example: [sɪlæ̀bəfɪkéɪʃən] or /sɪlæ̀bəfɪkéɪʃən/. That has the advantage of not requiring a decision about syllable boundaries.
- In English dictionaries that show pronunciation by respelling, stress is typically marked with a prime mark placed after the stressed syllable: /si-lab′-ə-fi-kay′-shən/.
- In ad hoc pronunciation guides, stress is often indicated using a combination of bold text and capital letters. For example, si-lab-if-i-KAY-shun or si-LAB-if-i-KAY-shun
- In Russian, Belarusian, and Ukrainian dictionaries, stress is indicated with marks called znaki udareniya (знаки ударения, 'stress marks'). Primary stress is indicated with an acute accent (´) on a syllable's vowel (example: за́мок). Secondary stress may be unmarked or marked with a grave accent: о̀колозе́мный. If the acute accent sign is unavailable for technical reasons, stress can be marked by making the vowel capitalized or italic. In general texts, stress marks are rare, typically used either when required for disambiguation of homographs (compare в больши́х количествах 'in great quantities', and в бо́льших количествах 'in greater quantities'), or in rare words and names that are likely to be mispronounced. Materials for foreign learners may have stress marks throughout the text.
- In Dutch, ad hoc indication of stress is usually marked by an acute accent on the vowel (or, in the case of a diphthong or double vowel, the first two vowels) of the stressed syllable. Compare achterúítgang ('deterioration') and áchteruitgang ('rear exit').
- In Biblical Hebrew, a complex system of cantillation marks is used to mark stress, as well as verse syntax and the melody according to which the verse is chanted in ceremonial Bible reading. In Modern Hebrew, there is no standardized way to mark the stress. Most often, the cantillation mark oleh (part of oleh ve-yored), which looks like a left-pointing arrow above the consonant of the stressed syllable, for example ב֫וקר bóqer ('morning') as opposed to בוק֫ר boqér ('cowboy'). That mark is usually used in books by the Academy of the Hebrew Language and is available on the standard Hebrew keyboard at AltGr-6. In some books, other marks, such as meteg, are used.

== See also ==
- Accent (poetry) – Stressed syllable
- Accent (music) – Emphasis on a note
- Foot (prosody) – Basic repeating rhythmic unit in a line of poetry
- Initial-stress-derived noun – Phonological process
- Pitch accent (intonation) – Term used in autosegmental-metrical theory
- Phonetic word – Sequence of morphemes clustered around one nuclear stress
- Rhythm – Aspect of music
- Syllable weight – Linguistic concept
