= Sharon Peperkamp =

Dutch linguist

Academic background
- Education: University of Amsterdam (PhD)

Academic work
- Discipline: Linguistics
- Website: LSCP faculty page

Sharon Andrea Peperkamp (born 1967) is a Dutch linguist and senior research scientist with the French National Centre for Scientific Research (CNRS). Since 2010 she has served as director of research of the Laboratoire de Sciences Cognitives et Psycholinguistique (LSCP) in Paris.

Topics of Peperkamp's research include phonology, phonetics, prosody, multilingualism, and speech perception. One of her major contributions is in helping to establish the concept of stress "deafness".

== Biography ==
Peperkamp earned her PhD in linguistics at the University of Amsterdam in 1997, and earned a Habilitation à Diriger des Recherches at the School for Advanced Studies in the Social Sciences (EHESS), Paris, in 2002.

Peperkamp has served in numerous senior leadership positions within the École normale supérieure (ENS), one of the constituent members of Paris Sciences et Lettres University (PSL). She served as director of the Département d'Etudes Cognitives (DEC) from 2014 to 2022; as founding director of the Frontiers in Cognition initiative for DEC and PSL from 2018 to 2022; as director of LabEx "Institut d'Étude de la Cognition" at ENS from 2014 to 2018. From 2007 to 2009 she served as a Déléguée Scientifique, Agence d'Evaluation de la Recherche et de l'Enseignement Supérieur. She also held the title of Maître de Conférences (equivalent to Assistant/Associate Professor) in the Department of Linguistics, University of Paris 8, from 1999 to 2010. Prior to these positions, she was postdoctoral Fellow at the LSCP from 1998 to 1999.

Peperkamp was one of the scientists interviewed for the film Poétique du cerveau.

== Selected publications ==
- Peperkamp, Sharon Andrea. Prosodic words. Vol. 34. The Hague: Holland Academic Graphics, 1997.
- Peperkamp, Sharon, and Emmanuel Dupoux. "Reinterpreting loanword adaptations: the role of perception." Proceedings of the 15th international congress of phonetic sciences. Vol. 367. 2003.
- Peperkamp, Sharon, and Emmanuel Dupoux. "A typological study of stress ‘deafness’." Laboratory phonology 7.2000 (2002): 203-240.
- Peperkamp, Sharon. "A psycholinguistic theory of loanword adaptations." Annual Meeting of the Berkeley Linguistics Society. 2004.
- Peperkamp, Sharon, Inga Vendelin, and Emmanuel Dupoux. "Perception of predictable stress: A cross-linguistic investigation." Journal of Phonetics 38.3 (2010): 422–430.
