= Efraim Racker =

Austrian biochemist (1913–1991)

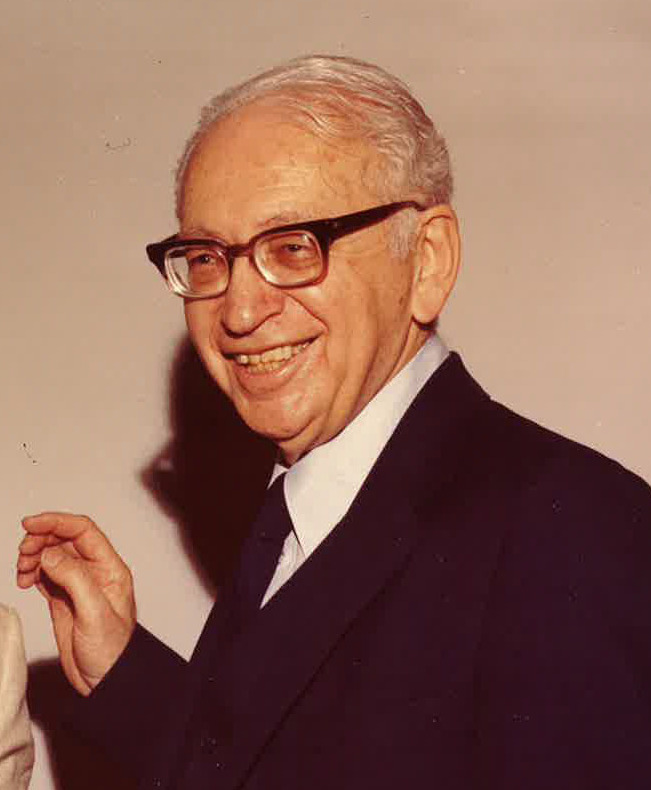
- Receiving the Sober Memorial Lectureship in 1982
- Born: June 28, 1913; Neu Sandez, Austrian Galicia (now Nowy Sącz, Poland)
- Died: September 9, 1991 (aged 78); Syracuse, New York, U.S.
- Education: University of Vienna
- Known for: Identifying and Factor 1 (F1), the first part of the ATP synthase enzyme to be characterised
- Relatives: Heinrich Racker (brother)
- Awards: Warren Triennial Prize (1974); National Medal of Science (1976); Gairdner Award (1980)
- Scientific career
- Fields: Biochemistry
- Workplaces: University of Minnesota; Harlem Hospital, New York; New York University Medical School; Yale Medical School; Public Health Research Institute, New York; Cornell University

Efraim Racker (June 28, 1913 – September 9, 1991) was an Austrian biochemist who was responsible for identifying and purifying Factor 1 (F1), the first part of the ATP synthase enzyme to be characterised. F1 is only a part of a larger ATP synthase complex known as Complex V. It is a peripheral membrane protein attached to component Fo, which is integral to the membrane.

== Early life ==
Efraim Racker was born to a Jewish family in 1913 in Neu Sandez, Austrian Galicia, and grew up in Vienna. His elder brother, Heinrich Racker, was to become a famous psychoanalyst. Efraim Racker was studying medicine at the University of Vienna when Hitler invaded in 1938. Racker fled to Great Britain, where he took a job in a mental hospital in Wales. His research focused on the biochemical causes for mental diseases. During the war, Racker was given the opportunity to practice medicine, but he decided to move to the United States to continue his research.

== Career ==
In the U.S., he accepted a position as a research associate in physiology at the University of Minnesota in Minneapolis from 1941 to 1942. While investigating the biochemical basis for brain diseases, he discovered that the polio virus inhibited glycolysis in the brains of mice. He eventually left his research position for a job as a physician at the Harlem Hospital in New York City. In 1944 he became an associate professor of microbiology at the New York University Medical School, where he continued his work on glycolysis.

In 1952 he accepted a position at Yale Medical School, but left after two years to accept the position of chief of the Nutrition and Physiology Department at the Public Health Research Institute of the City of New York. It was here that Racker demonstrated that glycolysis was dependent on ATPase and the continuous regeneration of ADP and phosphate. Maynard E. Pullam joined Racker's staff in 1953, and decided to uncover the mechanism of ATP synthesis in mitochondria and chloroplasts. Joined by Anima Datta and Harvey S. Penefsky, they set out to identify the enzymes used in ATP synthesis.

Racker left the Public Health Research Institute in 1966 to found the biochemistry department at Cornell University. He continued his research at Cornell, and was awarded many honors and prizes, including the Warren Triennial Prize in 1974, the National Medal of Science in 1976, the Gairdner Award in 1980, and the America Society of Biological Chemistry's Sober Memorial Lectureship. In addition, he was appointed to the American Academy of Arts and Sciences and the National Academy of Sciences. Efraim Racker died in 1991, but not before coining the phrase, "Don't waste clean thinking on dirty enzymes," which is often quoted as one of "The Ten Commandments of Enzymology".

== Discovery ==
Racker and his associates, Anima Datta, Maynard Pullmand, and Harvey Penefsky, worked to isolate the enzymes involved in ATP synthesis. They observed that isolated mitochondrial fragments were capable of respiration but not able to synthesize ATP. Racker and his co-workers concluded that oxidative phosphorylation could be restored by addition of the supernatant from the centrifuging. The complex making this restoration possible was named Factor 1 or F1 as it is a necessary coupling factor for ATPase activity. This discovery of the first enzyme of oxidative phosphorylation was identified and purified in 1960.

The factor that binds F1 to the membrane, Fo, was discovered later in conjunction with Yasuo Kagawa. This particle was found to be sensitive to the antibiotic oligomycin and thus named Fo. This discovery had the added benefit of silencing any critics of the role of F1 in oxidative phosphorylation because it conferred oligomycin sensitivity on the ATPase activity complex. Once both of these factors were identified Racker was able to confirm Peter D. Mitchell's hypothesis that contrary to popular opinion, ATP synthesis was not coupled to respiration through a high-energy intermediate but instead by a transmembrane proton gradient.

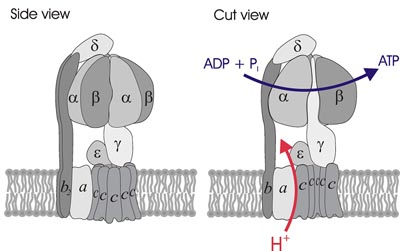
ATPsynthase http://www.atpsynthase.info/Basics.html

F1 is a critical part of ATP synthesis within the mitochondria. In its absence, Complex V is not able to create the proton gradient necessary to produce ATP. It is responsible for coupling the oxidation of nutrients to the synthesis of ATP from ADP and inorganic phosphates.

On September 6, 1991, Racker was felled by a severe stroke, and died in Syracuse three days after.
