= Victoria Hanna =

Israeli singer-songwriter

Victoria Hanna ויקטוריה חנה
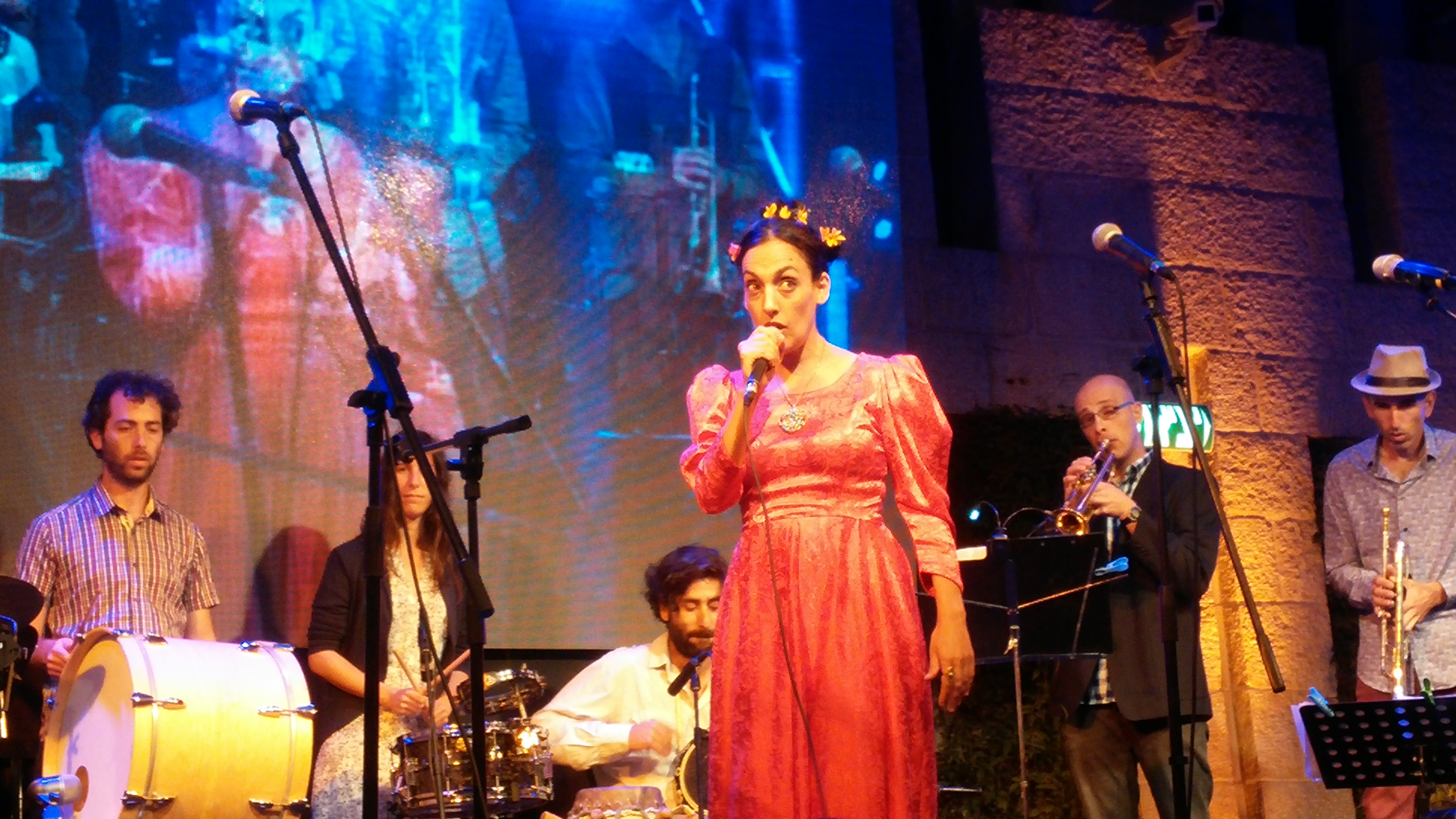

Background information
- Born: Jerusalem
- Origin: Israel
- Genres: Kabbalistic rap
- Occupation: Singer-songwriter
- Instrument: Vocals
- Website: www.victoriahanna.net

Victoria Hanna (Hebrew: ויקטוריה חנה; a stage name consisting of her first and middle names) is an Israeli multi-disciplinary artist, singer and musician.

== Biography ==
Victoria Hanna was brought up in an ultra-Orthodox Mizrahi Jewish family in Jerusalem by an Egyptian rabbi father and a Persian mother. She stuttered as a child. She was born in and lives in Jerusalem, and has three children. She studied acting in Nissan Nativ's acting studio.

== Music career ==
Hanna composes all of her songs. She released her first video single, a song called "Aleph Bet", the name of the Hebrew alphabet, in February 2015. It went viral on YouTube, with over million hits. Hanna's second video single, which she came out with later in 2015, is "22 Letters." It has been described as Kabbalistic rap, and is based on Sefer Yetzirah "Book of Formation" or "Book of Creation". Forbes listed her as one of Israel's 50 most influential women in 2015. She promoted her debut album in 2017.

Hanna sang in the Opening Ceremonies of the 2017 Maccabiah Games.

In 2021, Hanna took part in a musical piece specially commissioned for the Oud Festival in Jerusalem. Titled The Golem, the work is a musical interpretation of a contemporary poem by Haviva Pedaya, Ruchama Carmel, and Pika Magrik. Hanna performed alongside Iranian musician Amir Shahasar.

== See also ==
- Music of Israel

== Relevant literature ==
- Busau, Filip. 2016. Victoria Hannas Kunst: Zwischen Gebet, Popkultur und Interpretation. Freie Universität Berlin, Institut für Judaistik.
