= Serge Lebovici =

French psychiatrist and psychoanalyst

Serge Lebovici (French: [ləbɔvisi]; 10 June 1915, Paris – 11 August 2000, Marvejols) was a French psychiatrist and psychoanalyst.

Lebovici was particularly interested in the psychoanalysis of children, and contributed to introducing the thought of Melanie Klein and Donald Winnicott to France. He also has an interest in the theories of John Bowlby.

He was president of the International Psychoanalytical Association (IPA) from 1973 to 1977.
