= Traduire =

- DVD cover
- Directed by: Nurith Aviv
- Written by: Nurith Aviv
- Produced by: Serge Lalou, Itai Tamir
- Starring: Sandrick Le Maguer; Prof. Dr. Angel Sáenz-Badillos; Prof. Dr. Yitskhok Niborski; Prof. Dr. Anna Linda Callow; Sivan Beskin; Prof. Dr. Manel Forcano i Aparicio; Prof. Dr. Chana Bloch; Anne Birkenhauer; Rosie Pinhas-Delpuech; Ala Hlehel
- Cinematography: Nurith Aviv; Sarah Blum; Itay Marom
- Edited by: Effi Weiss
- Music by: Werner Hasler
- Production companies: Les Films d'ici; KTO; Laïla Films
- Distributed by: Éditions Montparnasse
- Release date: 19 January 2011 (France)
- Running time: 70 minutes
- Country: France
- Languages: Arabic; Catalan; English; French; German; Hebrew; Italian; Russian; Spanish; Yiddish

Traduire is a 2011 French independent underground experimental documentary art film directed by Nurith Aviv. It was released on DVD by Éditions Montparnasse, as part of a boxset, also including Misafa Lesafa (2004) and Langue sacrée, langue parlée (2008).

== Synopsis ==
The film, the third in a trilogy, containing Misafa Lesafa (2004) and Langue sacrée, langue parlée (2008), contains conversations with translators of Hebrew works into different languages. Among the interviewees are Brest, France-based Sandrick Le Mague, who translates theological texts into French, Boston-based professor Angel Sáenz-Badillos, who translates medieval poetry into Spanish, Acre-based Israeli-Arab novelist, screenwriter, and, journalist, Ala Hlehel, who translates the plays of Israeli playwright Hanoch Levin into Arabic, Malakoff-based professor Yitskhok Niborski, who compiles a Hebrew-Yiddish dictionary, Barcelona-based professor Manel Forcano i Aparicio, who translates the contemporary Israeli poet Yehuda Amichai into Catalan, Tel Aviv-based Israeli poet, Sivan Beskin, who translates the contemporary Israeli poet Leah Goldberg into Russian and Lithuanian, and, Berkeley, California-based professor Chana Bloch, who translated into English the works of contemporary Israeli poets Yehuda Amichai and Dahlia Ravikovitch.

== Reception ==
Critic Jacques Mandelbaum opined that "Aviv films these encounters carefully, taking time to listen to each translator in the half-light of their offices, bringing surprisingly passionate ideas to the surface" and that the film "finds room in its erudite enterprise to explore sensibilities."
