= Sivan Beskin =

Israeli poet and translator

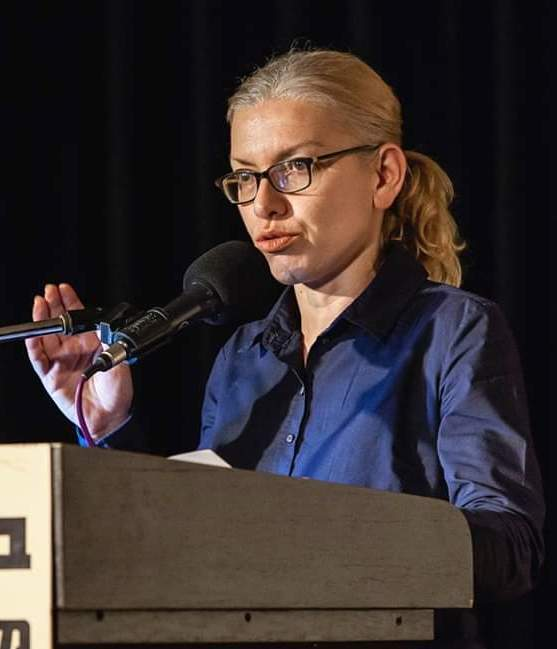
- Born: 31 August 1976; Vilnius
- Alma mater: Technion – Israel Institute of Technology
- Occupation: Poet, translator

Sivan Beskin (Hebrew: סיון בסקין; born August 31, 1976) is an Israeli poet, translator, and literary editor.

== Biography ==
Born in 1976 in Vilnius, in Soviet Lithuania to a Lithuanian Jewish family, Beskin emigrated to Israel with her family in 1990, settling in the kibbutz Ein Carmel. She later moved to Haifa, majoring in plastic arts in high school. In her mandatory service in the Israeli Defense Force she served as an instructor at the central computers unit, Mamram. She went on to complete a bachelor's degree in economics at the Technion university in Haifa. She has been living in Tel Aviv since 2002, working as an information systems analyst.

Of her childhood in Vilnius Beskin said in an interview:

Vilnius is a multi-cultural city: there are Lithuanian, Russian, Polish, and Jewish elements there. I went to a Russian-language school, but I was born into a world in which, necessarily, you hear several languages spoken around you. It educates and develops you differently. You learn not to fear the other. When you read a book, there are words you don't understand – and you take it in stride. You develop curiosity and a tolerance for the unknown.

Regarding her non-literary day job, she said in a different interview:

I think every intellectual should have a degree in economics. [...] I am first and foremost a woman of letters, and I consider translation no less important than my original writing. [...] On the other hand, I am very glad I do not make my living in literature, or I'd have been miserable. Happily, I can afford to choose what to translate, what to edit[...]. And only secondly, I am a mother.

== Literary work ==
=== Hebrew poetry ===
In the early 2000s she first published poetry, in Hebrew, on the Israeli Internet site New Stage, and in the online poetry magazine "Anonymous Fish?". Later, she had poems published in the literary journal "Helicon", and in the inaugural issue of "Ho!" (2005). Starting with "Ho!"'s fourth issue, in 2006, Beskin also serves on its editorial board.

In 2006, Beskin published her first volume of poetry, יצירה ווקאלית ליהודי, דג ומקהלה (Hebrew: A Vocal Work for Jew, Fish, and Choir). Unusually, the poems are organized in the book under headings not of poetic genres such as sonnets, but of musical genres such as blues, cabaret, and rock 'n' roll. Beskin said in an interview: "The only division that made sense to me was to divide in this musical way. I warmly recommend reading the book out loud. Every book of poetry I love must be read aloud. I always do that, and that's how I remember the poems, too." Of her deliberate mixing of language registers and cultural references, she remarked:

I consider the entire language material to work with. I learned that from Tsvetaeva, who uses the whole language. For example, in her poem 'The Fissure': it's a heartbreaking love poem, [expressing a desire to keep the lover being lost as though in an ice fissure] and she writes: 'You and I are bound like Etna and Empedocles'. Where did that come from, all of a sudden? Empedocles the ancient Greek philosopher studied volcanoes, and went to live on mount Etna, until it erupted and buried him and the surrounding villages. I happen to know that obscure story, but not many do; and suddenly it's in a love poem! Tsvetaeva does this repeatedly. For her, everything is legitimate material. If it fits in your personal world, it fits [the poem]. No language is taboo. I consider the distinction between high and low to be artificial. I strive to express my real thoughts and language in my poetry.

In 2011, she published a second poetry book, מסעו של יונה (Hebrew: Jonah's Journey), including Beskin's Hebrew translations of poetry by Marina Tsvetaeva alongside original Hebrew poetry. A third book of Hebrew poetry was published in 2017, titled אחותי יהונתן (Hebrew: Jonathan, My Sister). A fourth collection, אנחנו, חסרי המולדת (Hebrew: We, the Homelandless), was published in 2024 and deals with themes of protests, exile, and national identity.

=== Translation ===
Beskin is an active literary translator, and has translated into Hebrew from Russian, English, and Lithuanian. The authors she has translated include Joseph Brodsky, Sergei Dovlatov, Nikolai Gumilyov, Velimir Khlebnikov, Graeme Simsion, and Andrei Tarkovsky.

Asked in an interview what line by another poet she would have liked to have written herself, she responded: "So many... Selecting a specific one is impossible. I would start with 'In the beginning, God created the heaven and the earth', and work my way through world poetry. In some way, I get to do that as a translator." Similarly, asked about her favorite "foreign authors" (meaning non-Hebrew authors), Beskin responded: "To me, the term 'foreign' is inapplicable in the context of art and culture. Only the lack of culture can be foreign."

Beskin also translates into Russian, especially poetry by Leah Goldberg (also raised in Lithuania). Beskin was interviewed about her translation work in the 2011 French-Israeli documentary film Traduire.

== Reception ==
The 2005 publication of "Ho!", with eight poems by Beskin, attracted significant critical attention, and sparked some critical debate: It received a positive review from critic Nissim Calderon.

Hebrew University literary scholar Ariel Hirschfeld, reviewing the inaugural issue as a whole in an essay titled "Narcissus as scarecrow", rejected the poetic approach of all the poets in the issue, judging their poetry – which is metered and rhymed – "anachronistic ... simplistic, rhetorical, and overexcited". Of Beskin herself he wrote that she is "nothing but an angry pose", and that her poetry "lacks irony".

=== A Vocal Work for Jew, Fish, and Choir ===
In 2006, Beskin's first book received both positive (Ziva Shamir, Menahem Ben, Daniel Oz) and negative reviews (Daphna Schori, Shimon Bouzaglo). Oz specifically praised Beskin's poetry for its musicality, humor, and playfulness, as well as for the inventive rhyming combining "highbrow" and "lowbrow" culture (e.g. rhyming "Sonic Youth and DEUS" with "the forest of Orpheus").

=== Jonah's Journey ===
Of Beskin's second book, Jonah's Journey, critic Menachem Ben wrote: "Her new book [...] with her usual perfect rhyming, is first and foremost a poetry book that is interesting to read, unlike the vast majority of poetry books published here, which exhaust one with stylized prosaic verse; [Beskin's book] is written with innovative musicality. [...] As always, Beskin is half sentimental and half whimsical"

Critic and literary editor Erez Schweitzer, reviewing the book, wrote: "Beskin [is a] literary tourist, alluding to figures from Greek mythology as well as to Russian and French modernist poets; she expresses memories from a childhood lost in snow, as well as from travels in Europe and in India as an adult. [...] Despite these wanderings in space and time, Tel Aviv is central in [the book]. Almost paradoxically, Beskin is a very local poet, whose longings are anchored to the here and now, and do not reject [the present], but perceive and integrate with [its] frequencies."

Critic and literary editor Eli Hirsch described Beskin as "a central figure in the resurgence of Hebrew poetry in [the 2000s]", and noted that whereas the first book was "semi-decadent, playful, defiant", this book is different: personal, focused on growing up, on family, stability, and introspection.

=== Jonathan, My Sister ===
Hirsch also reviewed Beskin's third book, Jonathan, My Sister (the title alluding to the biblical Jonathan), praising its autobiographical candor, and describing the poems as "the most beautiful poems Beskin ever wrote". The book draws on Beskin's childhood in Lithuania, and the titular "Jonathan" is a codename for Beskin's childhood friend Sasha, a girl who in the poems becomes "an alter-ego for Beskin; the girl who stayed in Lithuania". Poet Bakol Serloui appreciated the book, but observed that "[... Beskin's mixing Hebrew and foreign loan words] creates exceptional rhyming. But precisely because of her great skill as a poet, in full command of the genres of classical poetry, there is a gap between the polished form of her poems and their content.", and was unsatisfied with the emotional authenticity of the longing and nostalgia expressed in the poems.
