= Israel Psychoanalytic Society =

Israeli NGO

The Israel Psychoanalytic Society (Hebrew: החברה הפסיכואנליטית בישראל, romanized: Hahevra Hapsychoanalytit be Israel) is the official psychoanalytic organization in Israel, a constituent member of the International Psychoanalytic Association, founded in 1933.

== History ==
It was founded in November 1933 by Max Eitingon and many other psychoanalysts, but was originally named Palestine Psychoanalytic Society. It was modeled on the Berlin Psychoanalytic Polyclinic—also founded by Eitingon. In 1934, Martin Pappenheim, a physician and associate member of the Vienna Psychoanalytic Society, fled the Nazis in Palestine. Three psychoanalytic groups were formed separately in the major cities of Tel Aviv, Haifa and Jerusalem. Eitingon became president of the community in 1933 and held the post until his death in 1943. After his death, Moshe Wulff became president. In 1948, one year after the foundation of the State of Israel, the Palestine Psychoanalytic Society was renamed the Israel Psychoanalytic Society. Earlier, the official language was German, and sometimes the analyses had to be conducted in two different languages. After Wulff left the post in 1953, for the next 20 years, it was led by Heinrich Winnik.

Among those living in Israel is the Vienna psychoanalyst Bertha Grünspan, a training analyst for the community.

The majority of the founders of the Israel Psychoanalytic Society are Russian Jews. In July 1975, the Society had 30 full members and 11 associate members.

== Former presidents ==
This is a list of prominent members who have led the Israel Psychoanalysis Society:

- Max Eitingon: 1933–43
- Moshe Wulff: 1943–53
- Erich Gumbel: 1953–57
- Rafael Moses: 1975–77
- Erich Gumbel: 1977–78
