= Jeanne Lampl-de Groot =

Dutch psychiatrist & psychoanalyst (1895-1987)

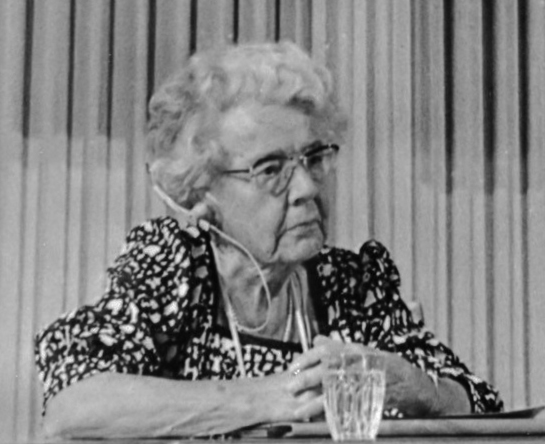
Jeanne Lampl-de Groot, July 27, 1971

Jeanne Lampl-de Groot (16 October 1895 – 4 April 1987) was a Dutch psychiatrist known for her work with Sigmund Freud and her research on female sexuality. After studying with Freud, she trained at the Berlin Psychoanalytic Institute from 1925 to 1933 and went on to found the Dutch Psychoanalytic Institute with her husband. In 1963 she was made the honorary vice-president of the International Psychoanalytical Association. The University of Amsterdam, bestowed an honorary doctorate in 1970 and she was also recognized as an honorary member of the Netherlands Society of Psychiatry and Neurology in 1971.

== Early life and education ==
Jeanne Lampl-de Groot was born on 16 October 1895, the third of four children, to mother Henriette Dupont and father M.C.M. de Groot in Schiedam. She attended Leiden University for her undergraduate studies and moved on to the University of Amsterdam for her medical degree; she earned her M.D. in 1921.

== Career and research ==
Lampl-de Groot began her career by studying with Sigmund Freud for three years, from 1922–1925. During these years, she established a close personal and professional relationship with Freud and his daughter, Anna. After studying with Freud, she trained further in psychoanalysis at the Berlin Psychoanalytic Institute, from 1925 to 1933. She worked at the Institute of Psychoanalysis, Vienna for five years following her stint at the Berlin Institute, spurred to move by the election of the Nazi Party in Berlin in 1933. Lampl-de Groot went on to found the Dutch Psychoanalytic Institute with her husband after her return to the Netherlands; their move was again motivated by the German political situation and the impending invasion of Austria. At the Institute, Lampl-de Groot developed formal training for therapists and analysts. She also wrote several papers on female sexuality and then transitioned her research into an exploration of psychoanalysis and its relationship to other sciences.

== Honors and awards ==
Honored in her later life, Lampl-de Groot was recognized by several psychiatric and psychoanalytic associations for her achievements. In 1963 she was made the honorary vice-president of the International Psychoanalytical Association. Her alma mater, the University of Amsterdam, bestowed an honorary doctorate in 1970. She was also recognized as an honorary member of the Netherlands Society of Psychiatry and Neurology in 1971.

== Personal life ==
On 7 April 1925, Lampl-de Groot married Hans Lampl, another psychiatrist and former suitor of Anna Freud. They had two children together, Henriette and Edith. She died on 4 April 1987 in Zwolle.
