= Association of International Collective Management of Audiovisual Works =

Swiss non-profit organisation

- Native name: Association de Gestion Internationale Collective des Oeuvres Audiovisuelles (AGICOA)
- Founded: 1981
- Headquarters: Geneva, Switzerland
- Website: www.agicoa.org

The Association of International Collective Management of Audiovisual Works (AGICOA) is a non-profit organization that negotiates, collects, and distributes royalties from the use of audiovisual works, whether via cable, satellite, mobile or any other similar means.

== History ==
Established in 1981, AGICOA operate under the terms of audiovisual copyright law set by the Berne Convention, the satellite broadcasting and cable retransmission European Directive 93/83/EEC (CABSAT 1) and the online broadcasting and retransmission European Directive 2019/789/EU (CABSAT 2).

AGICOA is set up as an Alliance of some 12 organizations in a unique partnership that enables the efficient international collective management of intellectual property rights.

AGICOA, together with CISAC and FIAPF, is a founding partner of ISAN_IA, the International Agency which delivers the ISO standard, ISAN (International Standard Audiovisual Number), a voluntary numbering system for the identification of audiovisual works.

== The AGICOA Alliance ==
- AGICOA, Switzerland
- AGICOA EUROPE, Luxembourg
- AGICOA EUROPE BRUSSELS, Belgium
- AGICOA GmbH, Germany
- AGICOA NORGE, Norway
- ALGOA, Luxembourg
- ANGOA, France
- APFI, Finland
- EGEDA, Spain
- FRF, Sweden,
- GEDIPE, Portugal
- ZAPA, Poland

== See also ==
- ISAN
- AGICOA Members List
