= International Psychoanalytical Association =

International organization

The International Psychoanalytical Association (IPA) is an association including 12,000 psychoanalysts as members and works with 70 constituent organizations. It was founded in 1910 by Sigmund Freud, from an idea proposed by Sándor Ferenczi.

== History ==
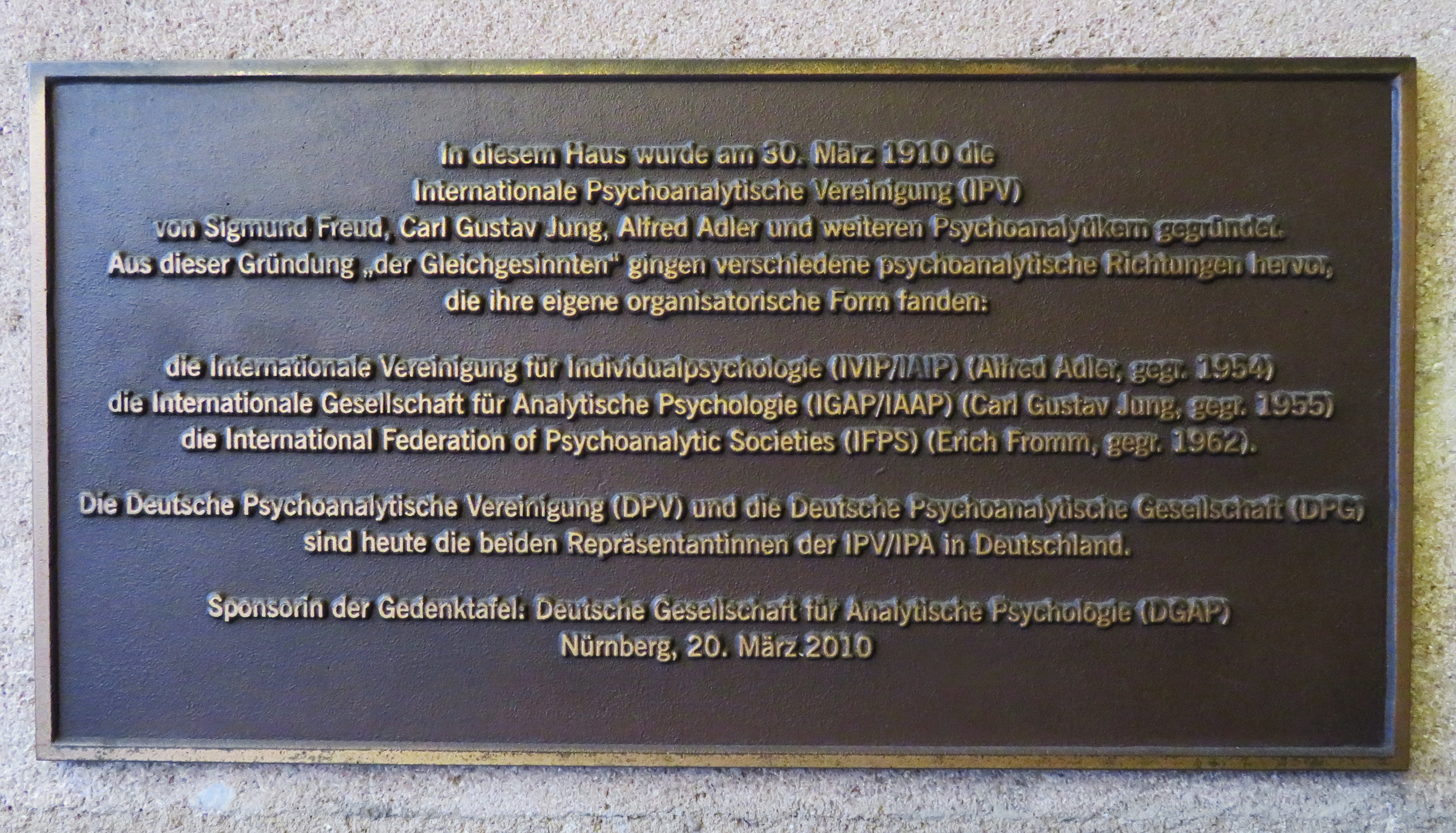
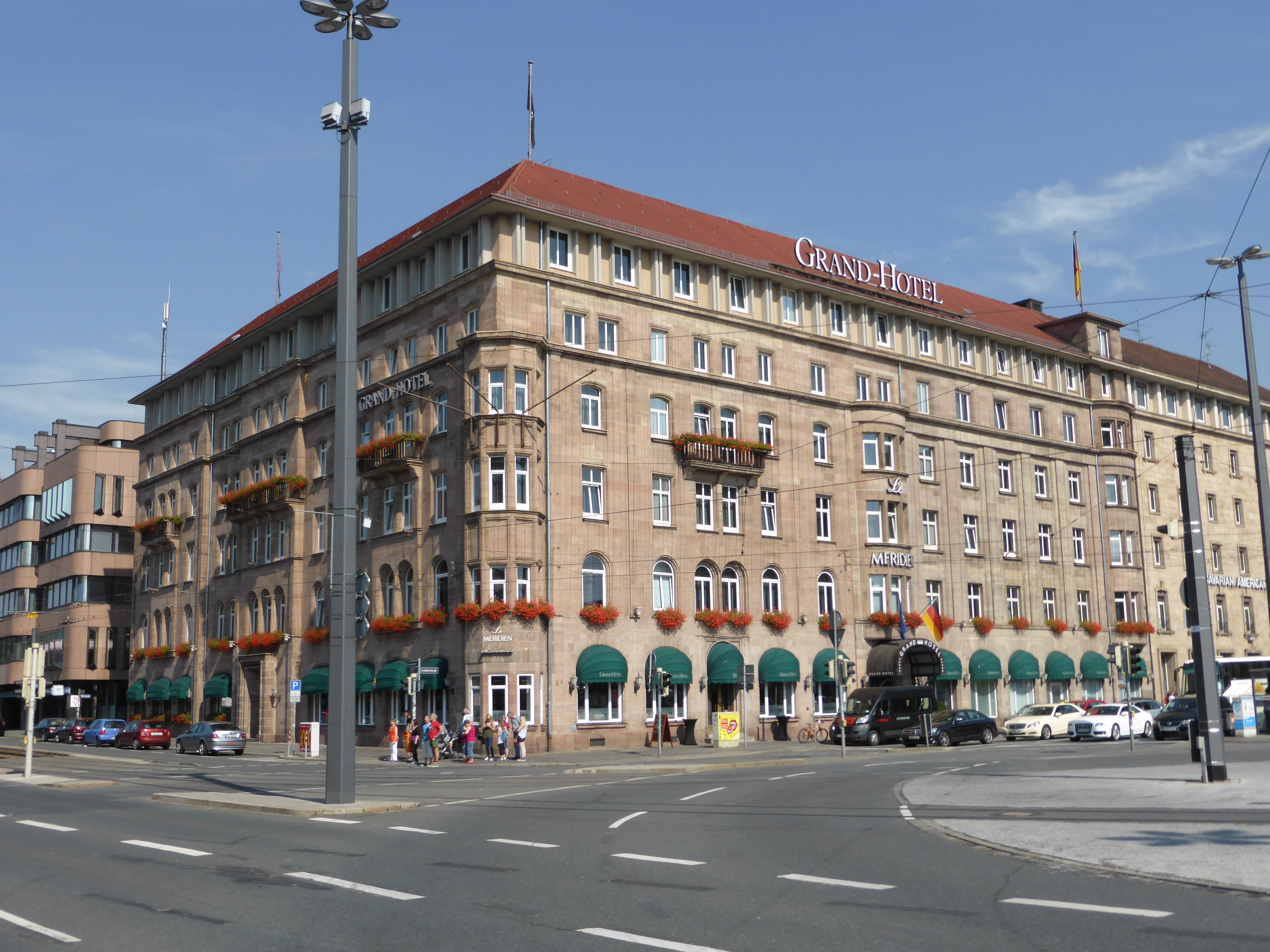
Plaque commemorating the founding of the International Psychoanalytic Association (IPA) in 1910, Le Méridien Grand Hotel Nürnberg

In 1902 Sigmund Freud started to meet every week with colleagues to discuss his work, thus establishing the Psychological Wednesday Society. By 1908 there were 14 regular members and some guests including Max Eitingon, Carl Jung, Karl Abraham, and Ernest Jones, all future Presidents of the IPA. The Society became the Vienna Psychoanalytical Society.

In 1907 Jones suggested to Jung that an international meeting should be arranged. Freud welcomed the proposal. The meeting took place in Salzburg on April 27, 1908. Jung named it the "First Congress for Freudian Psychology". It is later reckoned to be the first International Psychoanalytical Congress. Even so, the IPA had not yet been founded.

The IPA was established at the next Congress held at Nuremberg in March 1910. Its first President was Carl Jung, and its first Secretary was Otto Rank. Sigmund Freud considered an international organization to be essential to advance his ideas. In 1914 Freud published a paper entitled The History of the Psychoanalytic Movement.

The IPA is the international accrediting and regulatory body for member organisations. The IPA's aims include creating new psychoanalytic groups, conducting research, developing training policies and establishing links with other bodies. It organizes a biennial Congress.

== Regional organizations ==
There is a Regional Organisation for each of the IPA's three regions:

- Europe—European Psychoanalytical Federation (or EPF), which also includes Australia, India, Israel, Lebanon, South Africa and Turkey;
  - The IPA is incorporated in England, where it is a company limited by guarantee and also a registered charity. Its administrative offices are at The Lexicon in Central London.
- Latin America—Federation of Psychoanalytic Societies of Latin America (or FEPAL);
- North America—North American Psychoanalytic Confederation (or NAPSAC), which also includes Japan and Korea.

Each of these three bodies consists of Constituent Organisations and Study Groups that are part of that IPA region. The IPA has a close working relationship with each of these independent organisations, but they are not officially or legally part of the IPA.

== Constituent organizations ==
The IPA's members qualify for membership by being a member of a "constituent organisation" (or the sole regional association).

Constituent organisations

- Argentine Psychoanalytic Association
- Argentine Psychoanalytic Society
- Australian Psychoanalytical Society
- Belgian Psychoanalytical Society
- Belgrade Psychoanalytical Society
- Brasília Psychoanalytic Society
- Brazilian Psychoanalytic Society of Rio de Janeiro
- Brazilian Psychoanalytic Society of São Paulo
- Brazilian Psychoanalytical Society of Porto Alegre
- Brazilian Psychoanalytical Society of Ribeirão Preto
- British Psychoanalytic Association
- British Psychoanalytical Society
- Buenos Aires Psychoanalytic Association
- Canadian Psychoanalytic Society
- Caracas Psychoanalytic Society
- Chilean Psychoanalytic Association
- Colombian Psychoanalytic Association
- Colombian Psychoanalytic Society
- Contemporary Freudian Society
- Cordoba Psychoanalytic Society
- Croatian Psyhoanalytic Society
- Czech Psychoanalytical Society
- Danish Psychoanalytical Society
- Dutch Psychoanalytical Association
- Dutch Psychoanalytical Group
- Dutch Psychoanalytical Society
- Finnish Psychoanalytical Society
- French Psychoanalytical Association
- Freudian Psychoanalytical Society of Colombia
- German Psychoanalytical Association
- German Psychoanalytical Society
- Hellenic Psycho-Analytical Society
- Hungarian Psychoanalytical Society
- Indian Psychoanalytical Society
- Institute for Psychoanalytic Training and Research
- Israel Psychoanalytic Society
- Istanbul Psychoanalytical Association
- Italian Psychoanalytical Association
- Italian Psychoanalytical Society
- Japan Psychoanalytic Society
- Los Angeles Institute and Society for Psychoanalytic Studies
- Madrid Psychoanalytical Association
- Mato Grosso do Sul Psychoanalytical Society
- Mendoza Psychoanalytic Society
- Mexican Assn for Psychoanalytic Practice, Training & Research
- Mexican Psychoanalytic Association
- Monterrey Psychoanalytic Association
- Moscow Psychoanalytic Society
- Northwestern Psychoanalytic Society
- Norwegian Psychoanalytic Society
- Paris Psychoanalytical Society
- Pelotas Psychoanalytic Society
- Peru Psychoanalytic Society
- Polish Psychoanalytical Society
- Porto Alegre Psychoanalytical Society
- Portuguese Psychoanalytical Society
- Psychoanalytic Center of California
- Psychoanalytic Institute of Northern California
- Psychoanalytic Society of Mexico
- Psychoanalytical Association of The State of Rio de Janeiro
- Recife Psychoanalytic Society
- Rio de Janeiro Psychoanalytic Society
- Romanian Psychoanalytic Society
- Rosario Psychoanalytic Association
- Spanish Psychoanalytical Society
- Swedish Psychoanalytical Association
- Swiss Psychoanalytical Society
- Uruguayan Psychoanalytical Association
- Venezuelan Psychoanalytic Association
- Vienna Psychoanalytic Society

== Provisional Societies ==
- Guadalajara Psychoanalytic Association (Provisional Society)
- Moscow Psychoanalytic Society (Provisional Society)
- Psychoanalytic Society for Research and Training (Provisional Society)
- Vienna Psychoanalytic Association

== Regional associations ==
- American Psychoanalytic Association ("APsaA") is a body which has in membership societies which cover around 75% of psychoanalysts in the United States of America (the remainder are members of "independent" societies which are in direct relationship with the IPA).

== IPA Study Groups ==
"Study Groups" are bodies of analysts which have not yet developed sufficiently to be a freestanding society, but that is their aim.

- Campinas Psychoanalytical Study Group
- Center for Psychoanalytic Education and Research
- Croatian Psychoanalytic Study Group
- Fortaleza Psychoanalytic Group
- Goiania Psychoanalytic Nucleus
- Korean Psychoanalytic Study Group
- Latvia and Estonia Psychoanalytic Study Group
- Lebanese Association for the Development of Psychoanalysis
- Minas Gerais Psychoanalytical Study Group
- Northern Ireland Psychoanalytic Society
- Portuguese Nucleus of Psychoanalysis
- Psychoanalytical Association of Asuncion SG
- South African Psychoanalytic Association
- Study Group of Turkey: Psike Istanbul
- Turkish Psychoanalytical Group
- Vermont Psychoanalytic Study Group
- Vilnius Society of Psychoanalysts

== Allied Centres ==
"Allied Centres" are groups of people with an interest in psychoanalysis, in places where there are not already societies or study groups.

- Korean Psychoanalytic Allied Centre
- Psychoanalysis Studying Centre in China
- Taiwan Centre for The Development of Psychoanalysis
- The Centre for Psychoanalytic Studies of Panama

== International Congresses ==
The first 23 Congresses of IPA did not have a specific theme.

Number	Year	City	President	Theme
1	1908	(Austria-Hungary) Salzburg
2	1910	(German Empire) Nuremberg	C. G. Jung
3	1911	(German Empire) Weimar	C. G. Jung
4	1913	(German Empire) Munich	C. G. Jung
5	1918	(Hungary) Budapest	Karl Abraham
6	1920	(Netherlands) The Hague	Sándor Ferenczi
7	1922	(Germany) Berlin	Ernest Jones
8	1924	(Austria) Salzburg	Ernest Jones
9	1925	(Germany) Bad Homburg	K Abraham / M Eitingon
10	1927	(Austria) Innsbruck	Max Eitingon
11	1929	(United Kingdom) Oxford	Max Eitingon
12	1932	(Germany) Wiesbaden	Max Eitingon
13	1934	(Switzerland) Lucerne	Ernest Jones
14	1936	(Czechoslovakia) Marienbad	Ernest Jones
15	1938	(France) Paris	Ernest Jones
16	1949	(Switzerland) Zürich	Ernest Jones
17	1951	(Netherlands) Amsterdam	Leo H. Bartemeier
18	1953	(United Kingdom) London	Heinz Hartmann
19	1955	(Switzerland) Geneva	Heinz Hartmann
20	1957	(France) Paris	Heinz Hartmann
21	1959	(Denmark) Copenhagen	William H. Gillespie
22	1961	(United Kingdom) Edinburgh	William H. Gillespie
23	1963	(Sweden) Stockholm	Maxwell Gitelson
24	1965	(Netherlands) Amsterdam	Gillespie/Greenacre	Psychoanalytic Treatment of the Obsessional Neurosis
25	1967	(Denmark) Copenhagen	P.J. van der Leeuw	On Acting Out and its Role in the Psychoanalytic Process
26	1969	(Italy) Rome	P.J. van der Leeuw	New Developments in Psychoanalysis
27	1971	(Austria) Vienna	Leo Rangell	The Psychoanalytical Concept of Aggression
28	1973	(France) Paris	Leo Rangell	Transference and Hysteria Today
29	1975	(United Kingdom) London	Serge Lebovici	Changes in Psychoanalytic Practice and Experience
30	1977	(Israel) Jerusalem	Serge Lebovici	Affects and the Psychoanalytic Situation
31	1979	(United States) New York City	Edward D. Joseph	Clinical Issues in Psychoanalysis
32	1981	(Finland) Helsinki	Edward D. Joseph	Early Psychic Development as Reflected in the Psychoanalytic Process
33	1983	(Spain) Madrid	Adam Limentani	The Psychoanalyst at Work
34	1985	(Germany) Hamburg	Adam Limentani	Identification and its Vicissitudes
35	1987	(Canada) Montreal	Robert S. Wallerstein	Analysis Terminable and Interminable – 50 Years Later
36	1989	(Italy) Rome	Robert S. Wallerstein	Common Ground in Psychoanalysis
37	1991	(Argentina) Buenos Aires	Joseph J. Sandler	Psychic Change
38	1993	(Netherlands) Amsterdam	Joseph J. Sandler	align="left"| The Psychoanalyst's Mind – From Listening to Interpretation
39	1995	(United States) San Francisco	R. Horacio Etchegoyen	Psychic Reality – Its Impact on the Analyst and Patient Today
40	1997	(Spain) Barcelona	R. Horacio Etchegoyen	Psychoanalysis and Sexuality
41	1999	(Chile) Santiago	Otto F. Kernberg	Affect in Theory and Practice
42	2001	(France) Nice	Otto F. Kernberg	Psychoanalysis – Method and Application
43	2004	(United States) New Orleans	Daniel Widlöcher	Working at the Frontiers
44	2005	(Brazil) Rio de Janeiro	Daniel Widlöcher	Trauma: New Developments in Psychoanalysis
45	2007	(Germany) Berlin	Cláudio Laks Eizirik	Remembering, Repeating and Working Through in Psychoanalysis & Culture Today
46	2009	(United States) Chicago	Cláudio Laks Eizirik	Psychoanalytic Practice - Convergences and Divergences
47	2011	Mexico City	Charles Hanly	Exploring Core Concepts: Sexuality, Dreams and the Unconscious
48	2013	(Czech Republic) Prague	Charles Hanly	Facing the Pain: Clinical Experience and the Development of Psychoanalytic Knowledge
49	2015	(United States) Boston	Stefano Bolognini	Changing World: the shape and use of psychoanalytic tools today
50	2017	(Argentina) Buenos Aires	Stefano Bolognini	Intimacy
51	2019	(United Kingdom) London	Virginia Ungar	The Feminine
52	2021	(Canada) Vancouver	Virginia Ungar	The infantile: its multiple dimensions
53	2023	(Colombia) Cartagena	Harriet Wolfe	Mind in the Line of Fire
54	2025	(Portugal) Lisbon	Harriet Wolfe	Psychoanalysis: An Anchor in Chaotic Times

== Criticism ==
In 1975, Erich Fromm questioned this organization and found that the psychoanalytic association was "organized according to standards rather dictatorial".

In 1999, Élisabeth Roudinesco noted that the IPA's attempts to professionalize psychoanalysis had become "a machine to manufacture significance". She also said that in France, "Lacanian colleagues looked upon the IPA as bureaucrats who had betrayed psychoanalysis in favour of an adaptive psychology in the service of triumphant capitalism". She wrote of the "IPA['s] Legitimist Freudianism, as mistakenly called "orthodox"".

On the other hand, most criticisms laid against the IPA tend to come from a 1950s Lacanian point of view, unaware of recent developments, and of the variety of schools and training models within the association in recent decades. One of the three training models in the IPA (the French Model), is mostly due to Lacan's ideas and their perspectives regarding the training.

=== Homophobia ===
Among Roudinesco's other criticisms was her reference to "homophobia" in the IPA, considered a "disgrace of psychoanalysis.

According to psychiatrist Albert Le Dorze, the association is homophobic.

== Archives ==
The archive of the International Psychoanalytical Association is held at Wellcome Collection (ref no: SA/IPA).

== See also ==
- Columbia University Center for Psychoanalytic Training and Research
