= Arnaldo Rascovsky =

Argentine physician

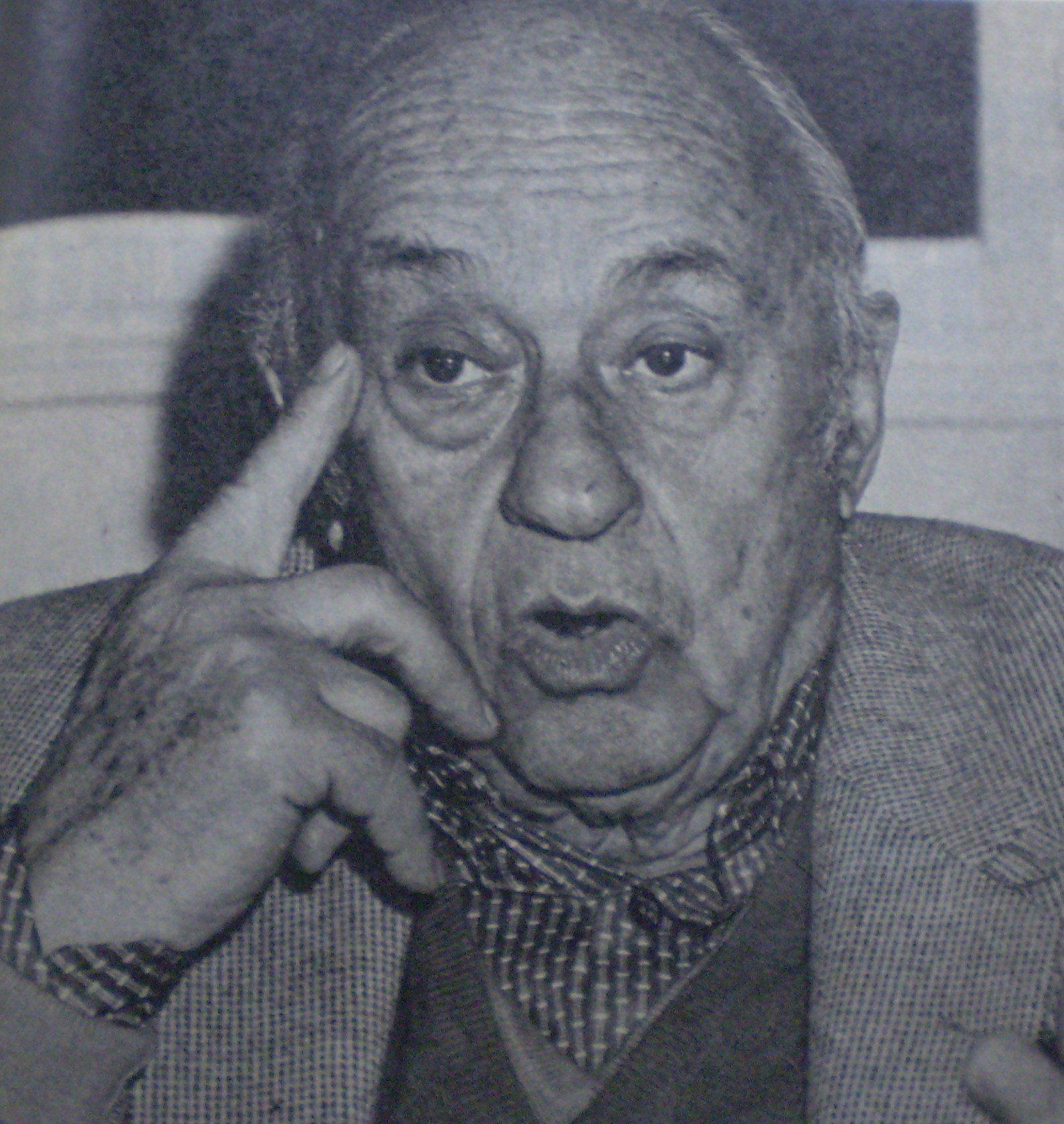
- Born: 1 January 1907; Córdoba, Argentina
- Died: 1 May 1995 (aged 88); Buenos Aires, Argentina
- Occupation: Physician

Arnaldo Rascovsky (1 January 1907 – 1 May 1995) was an Argentine pediatrician and psychoanalyst. He graduated from University of Buenos Aires. Rascovsky was instrumental in establishing Buenos Aires as an important center for psychoanalysis in Latin America and made significant contribution to the analysis of filicide.

== Selected works ==
- Filicide: The Murder, Humiliation, Mutilation, Denigration, and Abandonment of Children by Parents, (1995)
