= Haviva Pedaya =

Hebrew poet and academic

Haviva Pedaya חביבה פדיה
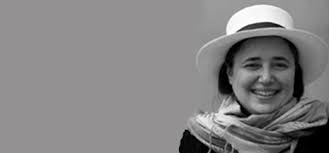
- Born: December 5, 1957 (age 68); Jerusalem
- Education: Hebrew University of Jerusalem (PhD)
- Occupations: Poet, researcher, writer

Haviva Pedaya (Hebrew: חביבה פְּדָיָה; born December 5, 1957) is an Israeli poet, author, cultural researcher, and professor of Jewish history at Ben-Gurion University, where she is head of the Elyachar Center for Studies in Sephardi Heritage.

== Personal life and family ==
Her great grandfather was the renowned Kabbalist Rabbi Yehuda Fatiyah. Her grandfather, Shaul Fatiyah was also a Kabbalist. His daughter, Pedaya's mother, Simha Ovadia Fatiyah, established the "Hazon" project, which provided vocational rehabilitation for people with mental illness. He owned a shop in the Mahane Yehuda Market in Jerusalem.

Her parents immigrated to Israel from Baghdad, during the 1950s, during the mass migration of Jews from Iraq. Pedaya was born and grew up in Jerusalem.

Pedaya is married to David Sorotzkin, has one daughter, and lives in Beersheba. Her interest in Jewish mysticism and spirituality began on a personal level before it became her area of research. She believes in reincarnation, a belief she "inherited" from her Kabbalist grandfather, and between the ages of 17 and 22, she undertook a ta'anit (ritual of abstention) of silence.

She defines herself as "religious by choice, not conditioning", and cares for all the street and yard cats and dogs in her neighborhood. According to Pedaya, "the condition of animals is a mirror of the human condition". After making her career in research of mysticism and Jewish history, she turned to writing prose and poetry. Her first prose book, Ein HeHatul (Eye of the Cat) includes stories of the animals she cares for.

As a Mizrahi feminist, she has collaborated with various Mizrahi cultural events and organizations, and is a fierce critic of the ways society continues to oppress women.

=== Academic career ===
Pedaya studied Kabbalah and Jewish philosophy at the Hebrew University. She graduated from the School of Visual Theater in 1991. She continued on to complete her PhD in Jewish Philosophy. Her dissertation was the basis for her book about Rabbi Yitzhak Sagi Nahor, "השם והמקדש במשנת ר' יצחק סגי נהור", published in 2001.

In 1987, Pedaya was appointed as a lecturer in the history department at Ben-Gurion University, and became a full professor in 2002. Since 2009, she is the head the Elyachar Center for Studies in Sephardi Heritage.

Pedaya stood at the helm of the Helicon School of Poetry (2014–2015), and served as an academic adviser at Alma College, where she also taught. She was a board member of the Chaim Herzog Center for Middle East Studies (2006–2007), and is a senior fellow at the Van Leer Jerusalem Institute, where she led two research groups – Piyyut, and The East Writes Itself. Pedaya is on the editorial board of the peer-reviewed Bezalel Journal of Visual and Material Culture.

She is the recipient of the Israel Academy of Sciences and Humanities Gershom Scholem Prize for Kabbalah Research for 2018, The Yehuda Amichai Prize of 2012, and the President's Literature Award of 2004, for her book "Motzah Hanefesh".

== Awards ==
- 1989 – Harry Hershon award, Hebrew University of Jerusalem
- 1989 – Warburg Award, Hebrew University of Jerusalem
- 1991 – Lakritz Foundation Award for the Study of Hasidism, Hebrew University of Jerusalem.
- 1997 – Bernstein Prize poetry award for her book "Miteiva Stuma"
- 2004 – Presiden'ts Literature Award for "Motzah Hanefesh"
- 2012 – Yehuda Amichai literary award for "Dio Adam" (with Muiz Ben Harosh)
- 2018 – Gershom Scholem Award, National Academy of Sciences

== Research ==
Pedaya's early research dealt with the birth of the Kabbalah in Provence and the circles of Nachmanides and his students in Spain in the 12th century. She is particularly interested in the phenomenology of the Kabbalah, which is where she began her research into ecstasy.

She later began researching the Hassidic movement of the 18th century, and Rabbi Nachman of Breslev. In her book "Hashem veHamikdash" she deals with the concepts of heavenly Jerusalem, the apocalypse, and the Kabbalah. In her two books about Nachmanides, she discusses hermeneutics, the land of Israel, symmetry, and the applicability of layers of exegesis to layers of reality; the relationship between the symbolic and the concrete, and how it applies to categorization of texts, and attitudes towards the Jewish diaspora.

Her Hassidic research tends to concentrate on mysticism, a subject she expanded upon in her book Vision and Speech ("Hamar'eh veHadibur"), in which she employs typology to describe the mystical. One of the ideas that sets Pedaya apart from other researchers of Hassidism is the argument that it is one of the major expressions of Jewish modernism, as opposed to other scholars who believe that enlightenment is the best expression of Jewish modernism, while Hassidism is archaic and undeveloped.

Another major subject of study for Pedaya is the concept of trauma in Judaism. She sees Jewish history as traumatic, and thus, she approaches her work as dealing with the theology of crisis. She considers the Spanish expulsion of the Jews as one of the most major traumas of Jewish history. Pedaya was the first person to apply the ideas of trauma and inter-generational transference to 16th century Jewish history – tools more generally applied to Holocaust research.

== Literary works ==
=== Prose ===
Her first prose work is Ein HeHatul (Eye of the Cat), published in 2008. It is a collection of stories about urban characters, interspersed with a study of the cat as a wanderer in the urban space. Her next work was Hotamot (seals), a collection of short stories influenced by folk tales. Some of the stories are realistic, while others allegorical and fantastical. Most of the book deals with the feminine existence: The girl-youth-woman in relationships and family settings, where a minor character in one story is the main character of another. Both books include Kabbalistic influences in both narrative and structure.

=== Poetry ===
When Pedaya won the President's literary award, the announcement included as a reason: "A masterpiece of lyrical poetry ... In multi-vocal and multi-layered language she is a trailblazer of Hebrew poetry."

MiTeivah Stuma (From a Cryptic Ark, 1996) is a collection of symbolic poems, many of which were later set to music by contemporary Israeli artists of multiple genres.

== Music ==
According to Noam Ben-Zeev, Haaretz critic: "At the basis of the rich consciousness of Pedaya is music, having crossed the border between the music of her home and her private world, and presenting her music to the public about a decade ago. It was a dramatic move that created a stylistic change in Hebrew music, and there are those who define it as a revolution."

In 2003 Pedaya established the "Yonah Ensemble" (dove ensemble), to create a renaissance of mystical and liturgical music from the Near East. The ensemble was active until 2010, with Pedaya as its manager and musical producer. The lead singer of the ensemble was the Hazzan Yehuda Ovadia Pedaya, Haviva Pedaya's brother. The ensemble was invited to perform at the Krakow Jewish Music Festival.

Pedaya was co-founder and producer of the musical show called "Yehuda Halevy Corner of Ibn Gbirol" – references to two main streets in Tel Aviv named after Yehuda Halevy, the Spanish Jewish physician, poet and philosopher; and Shlomo Ibn Gbirol, the 11th-century Andalusian poet and Jewish philosopher. The event, which took place at Heichal HaTarbut in 2004, featured performances by some of Israel's leading musicians, including Hava Alberstein, Kobi Oz, Eviatar Banai, Berry Sakharof, Ahuva Ozeri, Mosh Ben Ari, Ehud Banai, Shem Tov Levy, David D'Or, Yonatan Razel, Yonah ensemble, and others. The performance was released on CD as a live album.

Pedaya initiated and produced the album "Najarah" in 2013. The album included piyyut music of the Baghdad Kabbalists, with Turkish Sufi stylings, based on words by the 16th century Jewish poet Yisrael Najarah. She collaborated on several additional projects with musicians of varying modern styles: Berry Sakharof (rock), Aviv Guedj (fusion of rock, Mizrahi, and piyyut), and Dikla (singer-songwriter, fusion of Arabic music and pop).

In 2015, Pedaya staged "Hillula for a Mother – an Oriental Rock Opera", a requiem to her own late mother. The musical was performed at the Israel Festival. Pedaya wrote the words, and Peretz Eliyahu set them to music. The musical style of the composition is classical Arabic with oriental rock.

In 2013, Pedaya edited the book Piyyut as a Cultural Prism (Hapiyut Ketsohar tarbuti), which included a chapter by her entitled "Piyyut as a Dream and as a Window: Spaces of Memory", in which she analyzed the essence of piyyut.

In 2017, the annual festival of Ethiopian music in Jerusalem, Hullegeb Festival, featured the event The Return to Zion: Longings for the Heavenly Israel (“Shivat Zion” in Hebrew), a multi-layered, multi-style show based on Pedaya's work, in which participated Ethiopian-born and Russian-born singers and musicians, in styles ranging from the liturgical, to electronic, to jazz. Pedaya, who has written extensively about the Sephardic/Mizrahi immigration experience in Israel, sought to create inclusivity for a group facing not only issues of immigration, but also color-based racism: "“Judaism comprises all the diasporas, all the colors, all the music – all the scales and maqams – that they have in Eastern and Western music. And there are also Jews who are black, which I feel is wonderful."

== Public works ==
Pedaya is the creator of the "Zman Yehudi Maleh" (full Jewish time), an online encyclopedia of Jews from Islamic nations.

Between 2007 and 2011 Pedaya was chair of the non-profit organization "Reshimu" for a spiritual material environment, and chair of the non-profit "Hazon Fetiyah", the association created by her mother to provide occupational rehabilitation for mentally ill people. She was also active in the "Amcha" association, an assistance organization for Holocaust survivors, and was an advisor for the Haifa biennale.

In 2013, Pedaya ran for the city council elections in Beersheba, on the Meretz ticket, but was not elected.

In 2013–2014 was a co-founder of I-Core Center of Excellence, a cooperative venture between Hebrew University and Ben-Gurion University. She is responsible for two musical projects at the center: "Jewish Identity, Place and Absence", dealing with Hassidic music from Poland; and "Southern Eastern", Mizrahi Hazzanic music in southern Israel.

Pedaya is a member of the Hermes International Forum, which promotes world peace, and meets annually in Marrakesh, Morocco. The Forum works to process theological messages into spiritual and universal language of tolerance and acceptance.

Since 2016, Pedaya is chairperson of the Council of Public Libraries in Israel. That same year, she was appointed to the national council of higher education. She is also on the Advisory board of the Shaharit think tank, leadership incubator, and community organizing hub. In addition, she heads Makom M’Shelach ("A Place of Your Own"), a project of empowerment and rehabilitation through the arts for women with mental illness from all sectors of society.

== Other writing and commentary ==
Pedaya is a prolific writer of art criticism, opinion journalism, and social analysis, in particular about Mizrahi issues. For example, her essay "The City as Text and the Margins as Voice – Exclusion from the Book and Routing to the Book" explores musical culture as a mirror of Ashkenazi and Mizrahi society in Israel. She describes the dialectic between the geographical periphery, where she says the authentic voice and memory are held, and the center, where she says singers from the periphery flock to, seeking acceptance, but losing their true voices en route. Most of her early works on music and poetry form a manifesto on the topic of Mizrahi culture; her article "The Exiled Voice", which appeared in Haaretz in 2004, describes the ways that repressed memories are recovered by third-generation Ashkenazi and Mizrahi Israelis, as expressed in music.

Pedaya also writes about art, primarily Mizrahi art. She has participated in many documentary films about Kabbalah and Sephardic history and culture, including Local Angel (2002), Liquid of Life (2008), A Song of Loves – Rabbi David Buzaglo (2015), and Yeshurun in 6 Chapters (2018).

== Selected works ==
=== Research and non-fiction books ===
- Name and Sanctuary in the Teaching of R. Isaac the Blind, Magnes, August 2001 [Ha-Shem Ve-Ha-Mikdash Be-Mishnat R. Yitzhak Sagi Nehor: Iyun Mashve Be-Chitvei Rishonei Ha-Mekubalim]
- Vision and Speech: Models of Revelatory Experience in Jewish Mysticism, Los Angeles: Kruv, 2002 [Ha-Marʹe Ve-Ha-Dibur: Iyun Be-Tivʹa Shel Havayat Ha-Hitgalut Ba-Mistorin Ha-Yehudi]
- Nahmanides: Cyclical Time and Holy Text, Am Oved, 2003 [Ha-Ramban: Hitalut – Zman Mahzori Ve-Tekst Kadosh]
- Expanses: An Essay on the Theological and Political Unconscious, Hakibbutz Hameuchad, 2011 [Merhav U-Makom: Masa Al Ha-Lo-Muda Ha-Teiologi-Polity]
- Walking Through Trauma: Rituals of Movement in Jewish Myth, Mysticism and History, Resling, 2011 [Halicha She-Meʹever La-Trauma: Mistica, Historya Ve-Ritual]
- Kabbalah and Psychoanalysis, Yedioth Ahronoth, 2015 [Kabbalah U-Psicho'analiza: Masa Pnimi Be-Ikvot Ha-Mistika Ha-Yehudit]
- Return of the Lost Voice, Hakibbutz Hameuchad 2016 [Shivato Shel Ha-Kol Ha-Goleh: Zehut Mizrachit, Po'etika, Muzika U-Merchav]

=== Prose and poetry ===
- From a Sealed Ark (poetry), Am Oved, 1996 [Mi-Teiva Stuma]
- Birthing of the Anima (poetry), Am Oved, 2002 [Motza Ha-Nefesh]
- The Eye of the Cat (novel), Am Oved, 2008 [Be-Eyn He-Chatul]
- Bloodʹs Ink (poetry), Hakibbutz Hameuchad, 2009 [Dyo Ha-Adam]
- Imprints (stories), Yedioth Aharonoth, 2014 [Chotamot]
- Early and Late (poetry), Gama, 2015 [Mukdamim U-Meucharim]
- Hell Is Paradise in Reverse Gear (poetry), Hakibbutz Hameuchad, 2016 [Ha-Geihinom Hu Gan Eden Be-Revers]

==== In translation ====
- The Eye of the Cat, French: Waterloo, Avant-Propos, 2017
- Imprints, French [Contes des miroirs brisés]: Waterloo, Avant-Propos, 2015

=== Articles ===
- Pedaya, Haviva. The Great Mother: The Struggle Between Nahmanides and the Zohar Circle. In: Temps i espais de la Girona jueva, (2011) 311–328

=== Editing ===
- Mythology in Judaism, Beersheba, Bialik Institute and Ben-Gurion University Press, 1996 [Ha-Mitus Be-Yahadut]
- The Book of Rebecca – Judaism: Issues, Aspects, Excerpts, Identities (ed. with Prof. Efraim Meir), Ben-Gurion University Press, 2007 [Sefer Rivka – Yahadut: Sugiyot, Panim, Kta'im, Zehuyot]
- Piyyut as a Cultural Prism, Hakibbutz Hameuchad, The Van Leer Jerusalem Institute, 2013 [Ha-Piyut Ke-Tzohar Tarbuty: Kivunim Chadashim Le-Havanat Ha-Piyut U-Le-Havnayato Ha-Tarbutit]
- The Mizrah Writes Itself, Gama Press and The Van Leer Jerusalem Institute, 2015 [Ha-Mizrah Kotev Et Atzmo]
- Moriah Rahmani, A Heart Feeling Its Way Through a Wall, A City with No Shadow, Hakibbutz Hameuchad and Gama Press, 2016
- Interdisciplinary Handbook of Trauma and Culture. Yochai, Ataria; Gurevitz, David; Pedaya, Haviva; Neria, Yuval, eds. (2016).
  Chapter "Walking, Walking Out, and Walking Through: Transitional Space and Traumatic Time" by Haviva Pedaya. Springer.
