= Ángel Garma =

Spanish-Argentinian psychiatrist & psychoanalyst

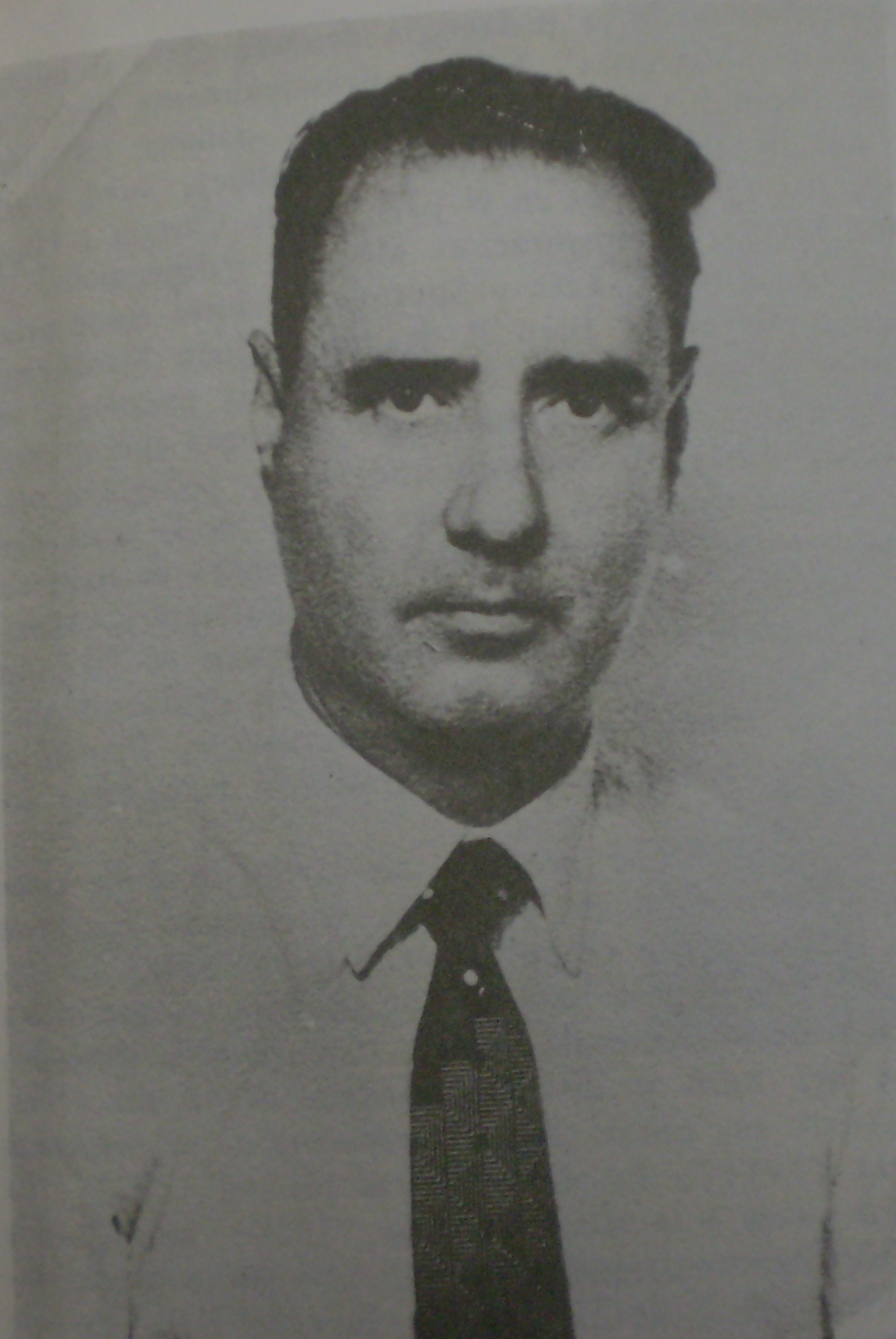

Ángel Garma Zubizarreta, most widely known as Ángel Garma (24 June 1904, Bilbao - 29 January 1993, Buenos Aires) was a Spanish-Argentinian psychoanalyst who has been called the 'founder' of psychoanalysis in Argentina. He wrote on psychosis, psychosomatic illnesses such as gastric ulcers and headaches, and dream interpretation.

== Life ==
Born in Spain of a Basque family, Garma studied medicine in Madrid. He then studied in Germany under Robert Gaupp and Karl Bonhoeffer and underwent analysis with Theodor Reik at the Berlin Institute of Psychoanalysis. A 1931 paper to the Berlin Psychoanalytic Association proposed - in contrast to Freud, who held that psychotics repressed reality to satisfy the id - that psychotics repress the id more drastically than do neurotics. He practiced as a psychoanalyst in Spain from 1931 to 1936 before moving to France and finally emigrating to Argentina in 1938. He helped found the Argentinian Psychoanalytical Association (APA) in late 1942, serving as its first president from 1942 to 1944, and the journal Revista de psicoanálisis.

== Works ==
- 'Die Realität und das Es in der Schizophrenie' [Reality and the Id in Schizophrenia], read October 1931
- 'La realidad exterior y los instintos en la esquizofrenia' [External Reality and the Instincts in Schizophrenia], 1931
- Psicoanálisis de los sueños, Buenos Aires: El Ateneo, 1940.
  - French translation: La psychanalyse des rêves, Paris: Presses universitaires de France, 1954.
  - English translation: The psychoanalysis of dreams, Chicago: Quadrangle Books, 1966. With an introduction by Bertram D. Lewin.
- Ensayo de psicoanálisis de Arthur Rimbaud, 1941
- Sadismo y masoquismo en la conducta, 1943
- Génesis psicosomática y tratamiento de las úlceras gástricas y duodenales, 1954
  - French translation: La Psychanalyse et les ulcères gastro-duodénaux, 1957
  - English translation: Peptic ulcer and psychoanalysis, Baltimore: Williams & Wilkins, 1958.
- Les maux de tête, Paris: Presses Universitaires de France, 1962. Translated by Elza Ribeiro Hawelka
- Le rêve: traumatisme et hallucination, Paris: Presses Universitaires de France, 1970.
- Nuevos Aportaciones al psicoanálisis de los sueños [New Contributions to the Psychoanalysis of Dreams], Buenos Aires: Paidós, 1970
- Tratado mayor del psicoanálisis de los sueños [Comprehensive Treaty on the Psychoanalysis of Dreams]. Madrid: Contenido, 1985.
