= Secret committee (psychoanalysis) =

The Secret Committee of the early history of psychoanalysis was formed in 1912 in order to oversee the development of psychoanalysis and protect the theoretical and institutional legacy of Sigmund Freud’s work.

== Historical context ==
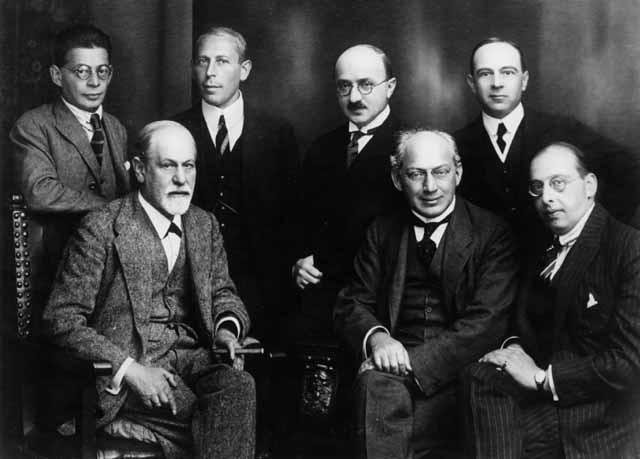
The Committee in 1922 (from left to right): Otto Rank, Sigmund Freud, Karl Abraham, Max Eitingon, Sándor Ferenczi, Ernest Jones, and Hanns Sachs

The Committee was formed at the suggestion of Ernest Jones in response to Freud’s concerns over the consequences of disputes over theoretical issues in psychoanalysis. These had already resulted in the acrimonious departure of Adler and Stekel from Freud’s inner circle of followers and by 1912 Freud’s relationship with Jung was reaching the point of terminal breakdown. In this context Freud wrote to Jones endorsing “your idea of a secret council composed of the best and most trustworthy among our men to take care of the further development of psychoanalysis and defend the cause against personalities and accidents when I am no more”.

The Committee membership comprised Ernest Jones who served as the chairman, Sándor Ferenczi, Otto Rank, Hanns Sachs, and Karl Abraham. Max Eitingon joined the Committee in 1919. Anna Freud replaced Rank in 1924.

The Committee first met on 25 May 1913 when Freud presented each member with a Greek intaglio mounted on a golden ring. They all undertook not to publish work which could be seen as departing from any of the fundamental tenets of psychoanalytical theory without prior discussion in the Committee. As well as regular meetings, the Committee established a practice of sending circular letters as a means of communication.

Jones intended the immediate political objective of forming the Committee to be the isolation of Jung and ultimately to force his resignation as president of the International Psychoanalytic Association. Though this transpired in 1914, his ambition to succeed Jung, endorsed by the Committee, was frustrated by the outbreak of war.

== Later developments ==
The Committee functioned well for a full decade, despite a world war, but dissension involving Rank and Ferenczi led to its dissolution in 1924. It was reconstituted later the same year, with Anna Freud replacing Rank, and resumed the practice of sending circular letters. After the death of Abraham in 1925 and Ferenczi in 1933 it ceased to function.

== Bibliography ==
- Gay, Peter (2006) [1988]. Freud: A Life for Our Time (2nd ed.). New York: W.W. Norton.
- Jones, Ernest (1955). Sigmund Freud: Life and Work: Vol 2: The Years of Maturity 1901–1919. London: Hogarth Press.
- Maddox, Brenda (2006). Freud's Wizard: The Enigma of Ernest Jones. London: John Murray.
