= Josine Müller =

Josine Müller was a German medical doctor and psychoanalyst. She was born on October 10, 1884, in Hamburg and died on December 30, 1930, on a voyage to the Canary Islands.

== Life ==
Josine Ebsen was the child of the Hamburg merchant, Herman Ebsen. Her mother died soon after Josine was born. Josine attended a secondary school for girls in Hamburg and then the high school she graduated from in 1906. Josine and her friend, Karen Horney, were one of the first women in Germany to study medicine at Albert-Ludwigs University of Freiburg in 1906. In 1912, Josine attended Friedrich-Wilhelms University of Berlin to complete her doctorate with Wilhelm His, on a text about fat reserve and ester cleavage in the blood.

In 1913, Josine married Carl Müller-Braunschweig, who was also fascinated with psychoanalysis. In 1925, they were divorced.

== Career ==
Josine first worked as a medical doctor in the children's department at Hohenlychen Sanatorium but soon developed an interest in psychoanalysis. She began training with Karl Abraham in 1912. She then worked at Berlin Friedrichshain Hospital as an assistant doctor from 1913 to 1919. At the Berolinum Sanatorium in Lankwitz, Josine completed her training as a neurological psychiatric specialist, from 1915 to 1916. Josine became a member of the Berlin Psychoanalytic Association in 1921 and worked at the Berlin Psychoanalytic Institute as a specialist in analytic treatment for children. With Hanns Sachs, Josine completed a secondary analysis from 1923 to 1926. She then worked at a private practice in Berlin Wilmersdorf in 1926.

Josine Müller was interested in psychoanalysis from a feminist perspective and issues with female sexuality. In 1931, Josine published a paper about her observations on the behavior of children. She claimed that girls have an intuitive understanding of female anatomy. Josine and Karen Horney were one of the first psychoanalysts to criticize Freud’s theory of “primary masculinity” and the dynamic that women feel automatically inferior due to penis envy. Josine contributed to a new theory of gender in psychoanalysis where biological females and males are equal and complementary poles. Janine Chasseguet analyzed Josine's ideas on female sexuality in her 1964 collection of essays Female Sexuality: new psychoanalytic research (La sexualité féminine: recherches psychanalytiques Nouvelles).

Before Josine Müller died, she was planning a larger work called The Infantile Femininity in Narcissism. However, she died from pneumonia on a boat trip to the Canary Islands.

== Works ==
- Josine Ebsen: About the course of fat reserve. Ester cleavage in the blood. Blanke, Berlin 1912 (Dissertation, University of Berlin, 1912)
- Josine Müller: Early atheism and poor character development. In: International Journal of Psychoanalysis. Vol. 11 (1925), H. 4, p. 487 f. (Digitized version)
- Josine Müller: A Contribution to the Question of Libido Development in Girls in the Genital Phase (1925). In: International Journal of Psychoanalysis. Vol. 17 (1931), pp. 256–262 (digitized version). English version in: Russel Grigg, Dominique Hecq and Craig Smith (eds.): Female Sexuality. The Early Psychoanalytic Controversies. Karnac, London 2015 (first published in 1999), pp. 122–129 (limited preview in Google book search)
