= Freud: A Life for Our Time =

1988 book by Peter Gay

- Cover of the first edition
- Author: Peter Gay
- Cover artist: Mike McIver
- Language: English
- Subject: Sigmund Freud
- Publisher: J. M. Dent & Sons Ltd
- Publication date: 1988
- Publication place: United Kingdom
- Media type: Print (Hardcover and Paperback)
- Pages: 810 (1995 edition)
- ISBN: 0-333-48638-2 (1995 edition)

Freud: A Life for Our Time is a 1988 biography of Sigmund Freud, the founder of psychoanalysis, by the historian Peter Gay. The book was first published in the United Kingdom by J. M. Dent & Sons Ltd. The book has been praised by some commentators and compared to the psychoanalyst Ernest Jones's The Life and Work of Sigmund Freud (1953–1957). However, it has been criticized by authors skeptical of psychoanalysis, who have accused Gay of lacking objectivity and of repeating incorrect claims about Freud's work.

== Summary ==
In Freud: A Life for Our Time, Peter Gay provides an in-depth examination of the life and work of Sigmund Freud, the founder of psychoanalysis. Through his historical perspective, Gay places Freud and his theories within the various contexts of his time and surroundings. He examines how the psychiatric profession, which Freud subverted and revolutionized, influenced his ideas and theories. He also looks at the impact of the Austrian culture, where Freud lived as an unbelieving Jew and unconventional physician, on his personal and professional life. He also explores how the traumas of war and totalitarian dictatorship that occurred in Europe during Freud's lifetime, affected the psychological state of the people and how it influenced his theories.

Furthermore, Gay explains how Freud's ideas have had a profound impact on Western culture as a whole, and how they have transformed the way we understand ourselves and human behavior. He argues that Freud has changed our understanding of ourselves and the mind, and that his legacy will continue to shape our understanding of human behavior for a long time to come.

Overall, Gay's book provides a historical and cultural context for the life and work of Sigmund Freud, and it offers a comprehensive and nuanced understanding of how his ideas and theories were shaped by the various environments and cultures in which he lived and worked, as well as its impact on Western culture.

Peter Gay critically examines the theories of Sigmund Freud, particularly his views on the emotional tie between a mother and her son. Gay argues that Freud's observation that the relation of mother to son is the only lasting intimate relationship that does not conceal sediment of hostile feelings is sentimentalized and not supported by clinical evidence. He describes this as a "wish" rather than a "sober inference from clinical material."

This critique is related to the Oedipus complex theory, which states that boys experience sexual desire towards their mothers and jealousy towards their fathers. But this theory has been widely debated and criticized by many in the field of psychology and psychoanalytic, as it has been found to be not supported by sufficient evidence, and that it might be based on the personal biases of Freud and his own experiences.

Gay's criticism suggests that Freud's views on this topic are not based on a thorough examination of clinical data, but rather on his own personal beliefs or desires. This highlights one of the criticisms that have been pointed out by some critics of Freud's theories, that he had a tendency to impose his own views and wishes on his theories, which created some limitations and biases in his work.

This criticism of Freud's views on the emotional tie between a mother and son is one aspect of Gay's book, which provides a comprehensive and nuanced look at the life and work of Sigmund Freud and the criticisms and limitations of his theories.

== Publication history ==
Freud: A Life for Our Time was first published by J. M. Dent & Sons Ltd in 1988. In 1989, a paperback edition was published by Papermac. In the United States, Norton published it in 1988 and in paperback in 2006.

== Reception ==
Freud: A Life for Our Time was praised by the philosophers Jerome Neu and Richard Wollheim, who have compared it to the psychoanalyst Ernest Jones's The Life and Work of Sigmund Freud. Wollheim observed that while Gay, unlike Jones, did not suffer from the limitation of being able to write only what the psychoanalyst Anna Freud found acceptable, his freedom as a scholar was nevertheless restricted by the policies of the Freud Archives. Wollheim wrote that Gay tries to integrate Freud's life and thought, including only as much of Freud's thought as necessary to understand his life. Wollheim credited Gay with excellent insight into the events of Freud's time. Christopher Badcock, writing in 1992, called the work the best up-to-date biography of Freud. Richard H. Armstrong credited Gay with "extraordinary narrative skills".

According to Kirkus, the book is more reverent than revisionist, offering a balanced but fundamentally admiring portrait of the man. Gay acknowledges Freud's failings and limitations but highlights his significant contributions to psychoanalytic theory and views his insights as hard-won truths. While the book may be challenging for newcomers to psychoanalysis, it provides a strong choice for those seeking a detailed exploration of Freud's life and work.

However, the book has been criticized by several authors skeptical of psychoanalysis, including Richard Webster, Allen Esterson, and the philosopher Todd Dufresne. Esterson identified Gay as one of several authors who uncritically repeat Freud's incorrect claim that during his early clinical experiences, which led to the creation of psychoanalysis, his patients reported to him that they had been sexually abused in early childhood, and he subsequently realized that in most cases these assaults were phantasies, not real events. Webster argued that while Gay presents the book as an objective exercise in historical scholarship, and considers the failings of psychoanalysis and Freud's mistakes, he retains a reverent attitude toward Freud, preserving the myths about him created by previous biographers. Webster called these myths the "Freud legend". Webster maintained that the acclaim the book received shows the persistence of the Freud legend, noting that with exceptions such as the historian Peter Swales, many reviewers praised it, especially in Britain. He saw its appeal to supporters of psychoanalysis as being its favorable view of Freudian ideas. Dufresne wrote that Gay has a "reverential" attitude to psychoanalysis, noting that critics have objected that it reports as fact claims that have long been known to be mistaken, including details concerning the treatment of Freud's patient Anna O.

The psychologist Louis Breger called Freud: A Life for Our Time the best known modern biography of Freud, but wrote that despite Gay's claims, the book is neither fair nor objective. Breger described Gay as being as "worshipful" of Freud as Jones, and accused him of not only portraying Freud as being on the right side of all controversies, but of portraying those on the other side, such as Josef Breuer, Wilhelm Stekel, Alfred Adler, Carl Jung, Otto Rank, and Sándor Ferenczi, as "cowards, petty, or mentally disturbed."

== See also ==
- Why Freud Was Wrong
