= Identification with the Aggressor =

Concept in psychoanalysis

Identification with the Aggressor (German: Identifizierung mit dem Angreifer) is one of the forms of identification conceptualized by psychoanalysis. Specifically, it is a defence mechanism that designates the assumption of the role of the aggressor and their functional attributes or the imitation of their aggressive and behavioral mode, when a psychological trauma poses the hopeless dilemma of being a victim or an abuser. This theoretical construct is also defined as a process of coping with mental distress or as a particular case of zero-sum game.

== History ==
The concept was first introduced by Sándor Ferenczi in his clinical diary in June 1932 and then developed in his paper "The Passions of Adults and their Influence on the Development of the Character and the Sexuality of the Child" (German: Die Leidenschaften der Erwachsenen und deren Einfluß auf Charakter und Sexualentwicklung des Kindes) for the 12th International Psycho-Analytic Congress in Wiesbaden, Germany, in September 1932.

He further elaborated this work until he published it in 1949 in The International Journal of Psychoanalysis with the new title "Confusion of the Tongues Between the Adults and the Child—(The Language of Tenderness and of Passion)". In 1936, Anna Freud took up and developed the concept in her book The Ego and the Mechanisms of Defence (German: Das Ich und die Abwehrmechanismen).

== Connection to repetition compulsion ==
The clinical link between identification with the aggressor and repetition compulsion was first outlined by Ferenczi, who observed that a traumatized child introjects the perpetrator's overwhelming terror and guilt, disrupting psychological development. As a consequence, the individual may remain "a victim throughout his life by repetition compulsion." This account contrasts with Anna Freud's 1936 formulation, which conceptualized identification with the aggressor as a defense strategy through which a stronger ego actively seeks to master a feared attack.

In contemporary relational psychoanalysis, this dynamic is described in terms of structural defense and dissociated self-states representing both the "victim" and "abuser" roles. These internal divisions may contribute to unconscious interpersonal enactments: by shifting from a passive position of helplessness to an active role of aggression, survivors may unconsciously recreate aspects of the original traumatic situation, either reenacting abusive dynamics with others or entering relationships that expose them to revictimization.

== Further research ==
From an economic perspective in metapsychology, the mechanism functions as an unconscious strategy to restore intrapsychic equilibrium after a severe trauma or narcissistic injury. When the ego faces a state of submission, it can try to compensate by obtaining a "break-even point" through a zero-sum game. Once reduced to the position of 'loser', the individual identifies with the figure of the 'winner' so as to reach a false psychological balance. This intrapsychic maneuver involves a profound manipulation of causal links and a splitting of the ego, which leads to systematic self-deception; rather than accepting the reality of defeat, the subject alters their own episodic memory and autonomous desire to fabricate an autarkic illusion of mastery.

=== The forbidden toy experiment ===
The experiment conducted in 1963 by Elliot Aronson and J. Merrill Carlsmith on the forbidden toy seems to endorse such a hypothesis and therefore this type of dynamic: one attributes oneself a mutilation of one's own desire in order to perceive oneself as autarkic, independent and not submissive. The temporal persistence of this phenomenon was investigated by Jonathan Freedman (1965), who found that children who had resisted playing with the forbidden toy under a mild threat were less likely to play with it several weeks later, when the original threat had been removed. From a metapsychological perspective, such persistence of behavioral avoidance is consistent with the internalization of an external restriction and a consequent alteration in the subject's relationship to their own desire. This dynamic highlights a fundamental boundary between human intrapsychic defenses and animal behavioral strategies.

Evolutionary and comparative psychology indicate that non-human species, particularly domestic mammals, cope with frustration, dominant authority, or resource obstruction through behavioral inhibition and displacement activities rather than repression. While an animal's internal drive remains intact under the surface—ready to be acted upon through opportunistic waiting once the external constraint wanes—the human ego uniquely utilizes its symbolic capacity to retroactively mutilate its own desire and rewrite its mnemonics in order to escape the trauma of submission.

In 2019, Yael Lahav, Anat Talmon, and Karni Ginzburg developed the Identification With the Aggressor Scale (IAS), a self-reported questionnaire that assesses identification with the aggressor based on the theory of Sándor Ferenczi. Utilizing the IAS, various quantitative studies among survivors of child abuse and intimate partner violence have documented the phenomenon of identification with the aggressor and revealed its negative implications for survivors' well-being. These implications include dissociation, self-injurious behavior, urges to harm others, violent acts toward others, suicidal ideation and behavior, willingness to return to an abusive relationship, eating disorders, feelings of guilt, sexual re-victimization, as well as PTSD and CPTSD.

== See also ==
- Internalized oppression
- Masters of suspicion
- Self-sabotage
- Cultural assimilation
- Conformity
- Wartime collaboration
- Quisling
- Learned helplessness
- Forced conversion
- Stockholm syndrome
- Ben Franklin effect#Converse
- Victim blaming
- Ragging
- Ponzi scheme

=== Proverbs ===
- More Irish than the Irish themselves
- Holier-than-thou
- More royalist than the king
- If you can't beat them, join them

=== In art (chronological order) ===
- L'Héautontimorouménos, Charles Baudelaire
- Zombie apocalypse
- H. R. Giger
  - Alien (franchise)
- "Mr. Self Destruct", Nine Inch Nails
- Fight Club: 1996 Chuck Palahniuk's novel and 1999 David Fincher's film
