= Sexual reproduction =

Biological process

In the first stage of sexual reproduction, meiosis, the number of chromosomes is reduced from a diploid number (2n) to a haploid number (n). During fertilisation, haploid gametes come together to form a diploid zygote, and the original number of chromosomes is restored.

Sexual reproduction is a type of reproduction that involves a complex life cycle in which a gamete (haploid reproductive cells, such as a sperm or egg cell) with a single set of chromosomes combines with another gamete to produce a zygote that develops into an organism composed of cells with two sets of chromosomes (diploid). This is typical in animals, though the number of chromosome sets and how that number changes in sexual reproduction varies, especially among plants, fungi, and other eukaryotes.

In placental mammals, sperm cells exit the penis through the male urethra and enter the vagina during copulation, while egg cells enter the uterus through the oviduct. Other vertebrates of both sexes possess a cloaca for the release of sperm or egg cells.

Sexual reproduction is the most common life cycle in multicellular eukaryotes, such as animals, fungi and plants. Sexual reproduction also occurs in some unicellular eukaryotes. Sexual reproduction does not occur in prokaryotes, unicellular organisms without cell nuclei, such as bacteria and archaea. However, some processes in bacteria, including bacterial conjugation, transformation and transduction, may be considered analogous to sexual reproduction in that they incorporate new genetic information. Some proteins and other features that are key for sexual reproduction may have arisen in bacteria, but sexual reproduction is believed to have developed in an ancient eukaryotic ancestor.

In eukaryotes, diploid precursor cells divide to produce haploid cells in a process called meiosis. In meiosis, DNA is replicated to produce a total of four copies of each chromosome. This is followed by two cell divisions to generate haploid gametes. After the DNA is replicated in meiosis, the homologous chromosomes pair up so that their DNA sequences are aligned with each other. During this period before cell divisions, genetic information is exchanged between homologous chromosomes in genetic recombination. Homologous chromosomes contain highly similar but not identical information, and by exchanging similar but not identical regions, genetic recombination increases genetic diversity among future generations.

During sexual reproduction, two haploid gametes combine into one diploid cell known as a zygote in a process called fertilization. The nuclei from the gametes fuse, and each gamete contributes half of the genetic material of the zygote. Multiple cell divisions by mitosis (without change in the number of chromosomes) then develop into a multicellular diploid phase or generation. In plants, the diploid phase, known as the sporophyte, produces spores by meiosis. These spores then germinate and divide by mitosis to form a haploid multicellular phase, the gametophyte, which produces gametes directly by mitosis. This type of life cycle, involving alternation between two multicellular phases, the sexual haploid gametophyte and asexual diploid sporophyte, is known as alternation of generations.

The evolution of sexual reproduction is considered paradoxical, because asexual reproduction should be able to outperform it as every young organism created can bear its own young. This implies that an asexual population has an intrinsic capacity to grow more rapidly with each generation. This 50% cost is a fitness disadvantage of sexual reproduction. The two-fold cost of sex includes this cost and the fact that any organism can only pass on 50% of its own genes to its offspring. However, one definite advantage of sexual reproduction is that it increases genetic diversity and impedes the accumulation of harmful genetic mutations.

Sexual selection is a mode of natural selection in which some individuals out-reproduce others of a population because they are better at securing mates for sexual reproduction. It has been described as "a powerful evolutionary force that does not exist in asexual populations".

== Evolution ==
The first fossilized evidence of sexual reproduction in eukaryotes is from the Stenian period, about 1.05 billion years old.

Biologists studying evolution propose several explanations for the development of sexual reproduction and its maintenance. These reasons include reducing the likelihood of the accumulation of deleterious mutations, increasing rate of adaptation to changing environments, dealing with competition, DNA repair, masking deleterious mutations, and reducing genetic variation on the genomic level. All of these ideas about why sexual reproduction has been maintained are generally supported, but ultimately the size of the population determines if sexual reproduction is entirely beneficial. Larger populations appear to respond more quickly to some of the benefits obtained through sexual reproduction than do smaller population sizes.

However, newer models presented in recent years suggest a basic advantage for sexual reproduction in slowly reproducing complex organisms.

Sexual reproduction allows these species to exhibit characteristics that depend on the specific environment that they inhabit, and the particular survival strategies that they employ.

== Sexual selection ==
In order to reproduce sexually, both females and males need to find a mate. Generally in animals mate choice is made by females while males compete to be chosen. This can lead organisms to extreme efforts in order to reproduce, such as combat and display, or produce extreme features caused by a positive feedback known as a Fisherian runaway. Thus sexual reproduction, as a form of natural selection, has an effect on evolution. Sexual dimorphism is where the basic phenotypic traits vary between males and females of the same species. Dimorphism is found in both sex organs and in secondary sex characteristics, body size, physical strength and morphology, biological ornamentation, behavior and other bodily traits. However, sexual selection is only implied over an extended period of time leading to sexual dimorphism.

Animals can develop a wide array of unique and distinctive features as a direct result of sexual selection. One common example is how peacocks have large and unwieldy tails that make survival difficult, so hens select males who display healthier, vibrant tail feathers that are indicative of good survival skills. Lions with darker and fuller manes are more attractive to lionesses, despite being consequently susceptible to hot temperatures. Female deer prefer males with larger antlers who boast higher fitness. All are instances of traits evolved in males due to sexual selection by females.

== Animals ==
=== Arthropods ===
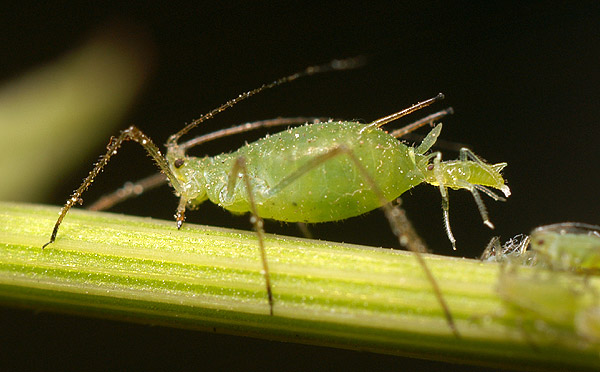
Aphid giving birth to live young from an unfertilized egg

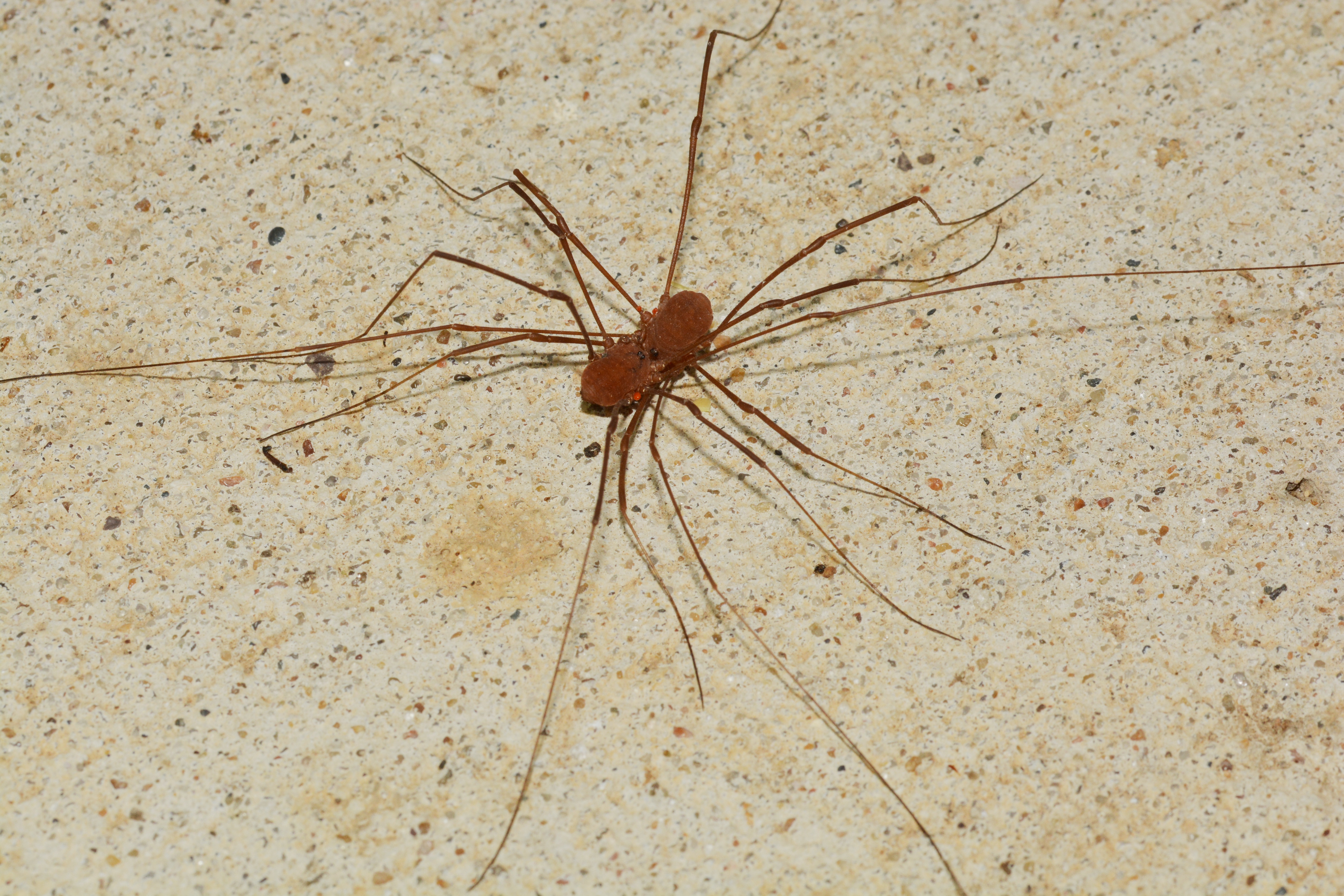
Harvestmen mating

A few arthropods, such as barnacles, are hermaphroditic, that is, each can have the organs of both sexes. However, individuals of most species remain of one sex their entire lives. A few species of insects and crustaceans can reproduce by parthenogenesis, especially if conditions favour a "population explosion". However, most arthropods rely on sexual reproduction, and parthenogenetic species often revert to sexual reproduction when conditions become less favourable. The ability to undergo meiosis is widespread among arthropods including both those that reproduce sexually and those that reproduce parthenogenetically. Although meiosis is a major characteristic of arthropods, understanding of its fundamental adaptive benefit has long been regarded as an unresolved problem, that appears to have remained unsettled.

Aquatic arthropods may breed by external fertilization, as for example horseshoe crabs do, or by internal fertilization, where the ova remain in the female's body and the sperm must somehow be inserted. All known terrestrial arthropods use internal fertilization. Opiliones (harvestmen), millipedes, and some crustaceans use modified appendages such as gonopods or penises to transfer the sperm directly to the female. However, most male terrestrial arthropods produce spermatophores, waterproof packets of sperm, which the females take into their bodies. A few such species rely on females to find spermatophores that have already been deposited on the ground, but in most cases males only deposit spermatophores when complex courtship rituals look likely to be successful.

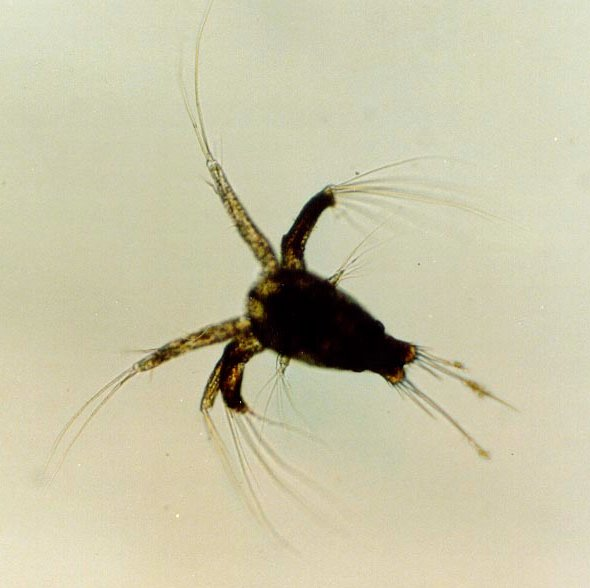
The nauplius larva of a penaeid shrimp

Most arthropods lay eggs, but scorpions are ovoviviparous: they produce live young after the eggs have hatched inside the mother, and are noted for prolonged maternal care. Newly born arthropods have diverse forms, and insects alone cover the range of extremes. Some hatch as apparently miniature adults (direct development), and in some cases, such as silverfish, the hatchlings do not feed and may be helpless until after their first moult. Many insects (Holometabola) hatch as grubs or caterpillars, which do not have segmented limbs or hardened cuticles, and metamorphose into adult forms by entering an inactive phase in which the larval tissues are broken down and re-used to build the adult body. Dragonfly larvae have the typical cuticles and jointed limbs of arthropods but are flightless water-breathers with extendable jaws. Crustaceans commonly hatch as tiny nauplius larvae that have only three segments and pairs of appendages.

==== Insects ====
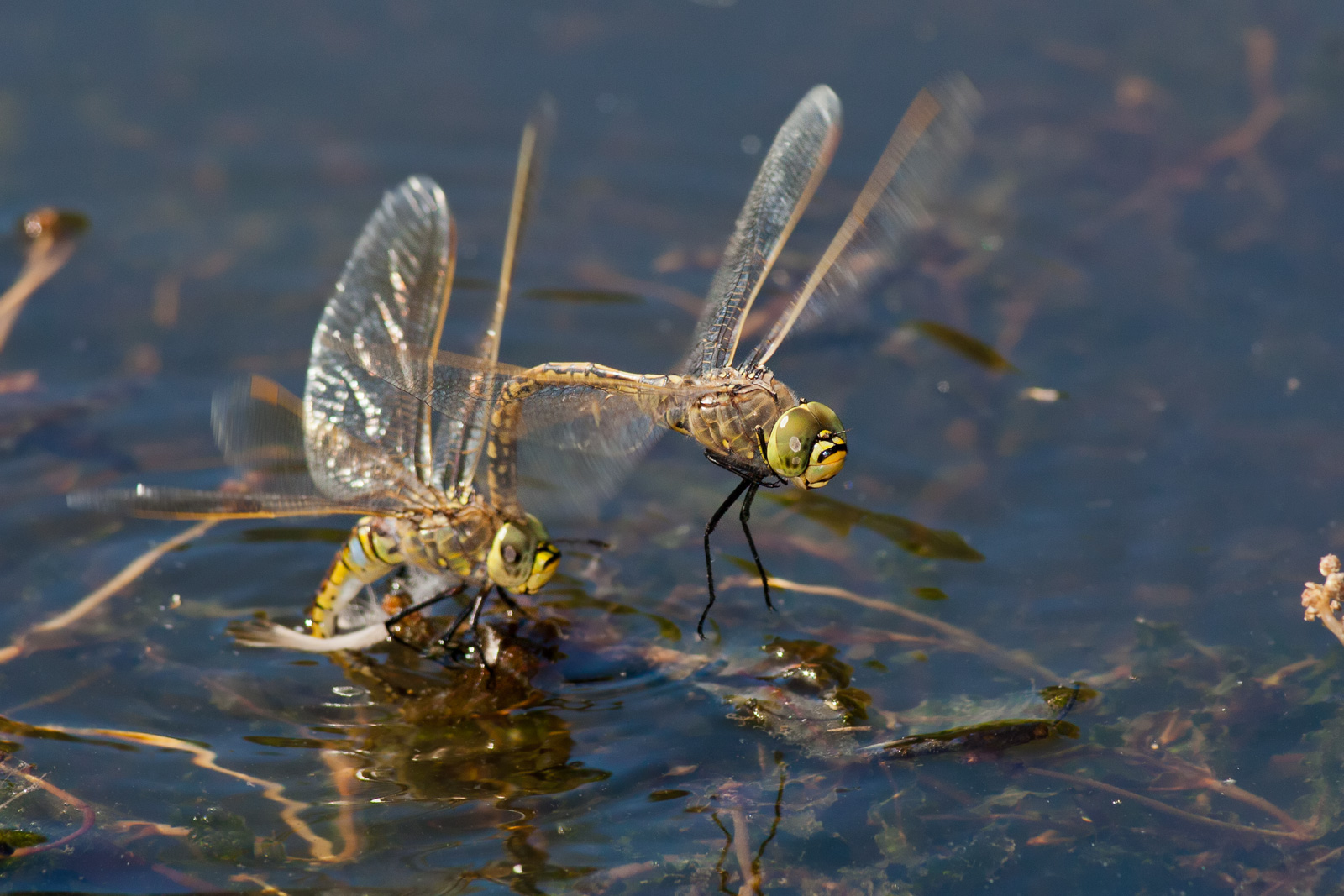
An Australian emperor dragonfly laying eggs, guarded by a male

Insect species make up more than two-thirds of all extant animal species. Most insect species reproduce sexually, though some species are facultatively parthenogenetic. Many insect species have sexual dimorphism, while in others the sexes look nearly identical. Typically they have two sexes with males producing spermatozoa and females ova. The ova develop into eggs that have a covering called the chorion, which forms before internal fertilization. Insects have very diverse mating and reproductive strategies most often resulting in the male depositing a spermatophore within the female, which she stores until she is ready for egg fertilization. After fertilization, and the formation of a zygote, and varying degrees of development, in many species the eggs are deposited outside the female; while in others, they develop further within the female and the young are born live.

=== Mammals ===
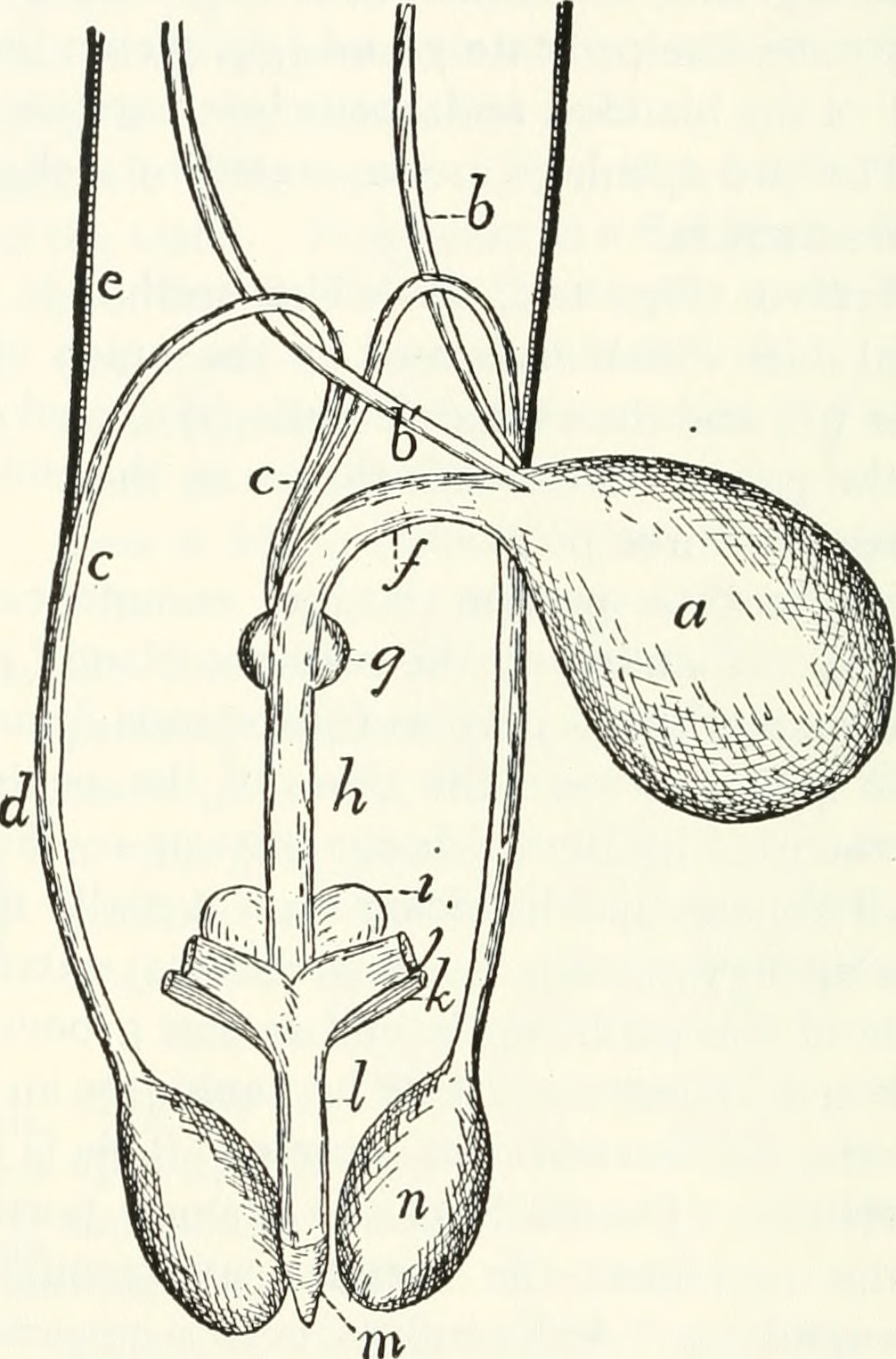
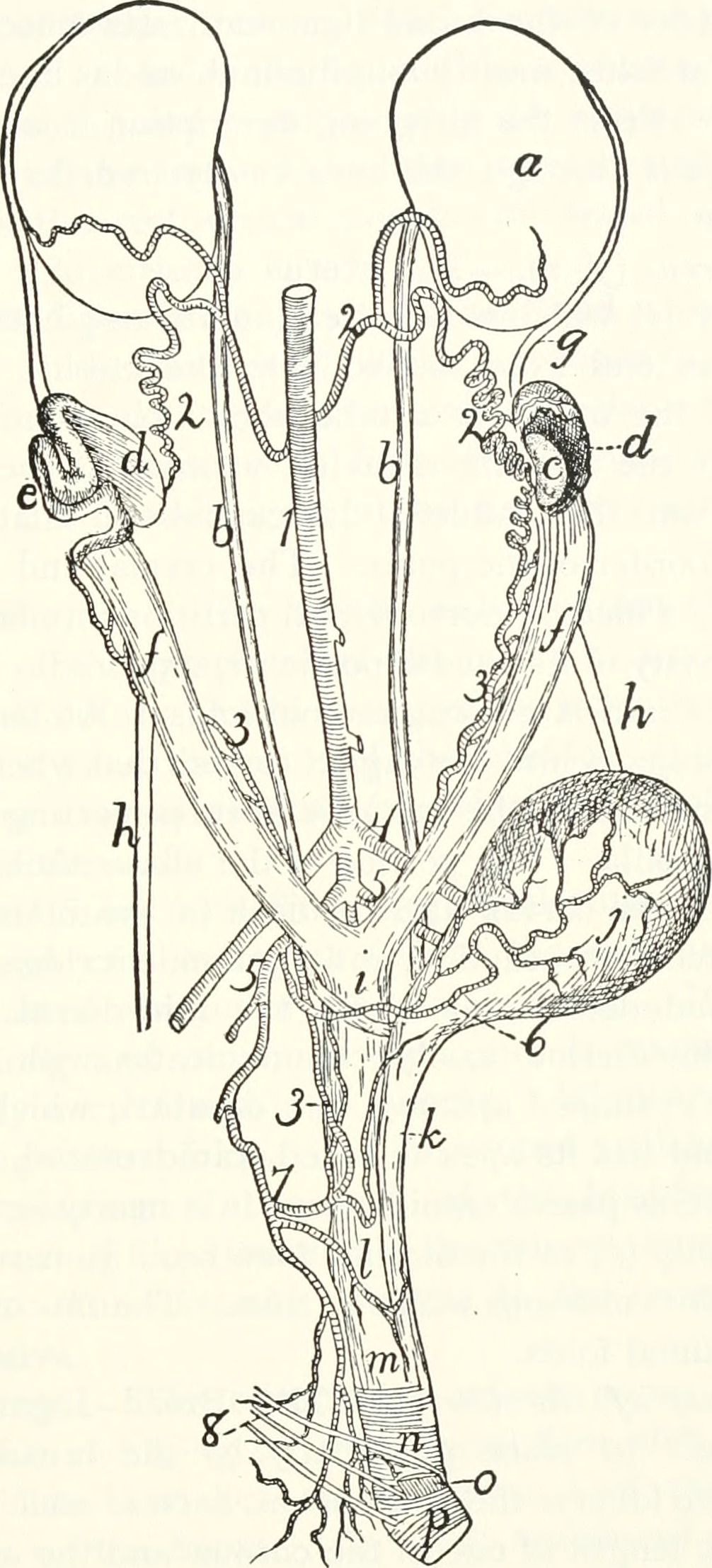
Genitourinary system of a male and female cat

There are three extant kinds of mammals: monotremes, placentals and marsupials, all with internal fertilization. In placental mammals, offspring are born as juveniles: complete animals with the sex organs present although not reproductively functional. After several months or years, depending on the species, the sex organs develop further to maturity and the animal becomes sexually mature. Most female mammals are only fertile during certain periods during their estrous cycle, at which point they are ready to mate. For most mammals, males and females exchange sexual partners throughout their adult lives.

=== Fish ===
The vast majority of fish species lay eggs that are then fertilized by the male. Some species lay their eggs on a substrate like a rock or on plants, while others scatter their eggs and the eggs are fertilized as they drift or sink in the water column.

Some fish species use internal fertilization and then disperse the developing eggs or give birth to live offspring. Fish that have live-bearing offspring include the guppy and mollies or Poecilia. Fishes that give birth to live young can be ovoviviparous, where the eggs are fertilized within the female and the eggs simply hatch within the female body, or in seahorses, the male carries the developing young within a pouch, and gives birth to live young. Fishes can also be viviparous, where the female supplies nourishment to the internally growing offspring. Some fish are hermaphrodites, where a single fish is both male and female and can produce eggs and sperm. In hermaphroditic fish, some are male and female at the same time while in other fish they are serially hermaphroditic; starting as one sex and changing to the other. In at least one hermaphroditic species, self-fertilization occurs when the eggs and sperm are released together. Internal self-fertilization may occur in some other species. One fish species does not reproduce by sexual reproduction but uses sex to produce offspring; Poecilia formosa is a unisex species that uses a form of parthenogenesis called gynogenesis, where unfertilized eggs develop into embryos that produce female offspring. Poecilia formosa mate with males of other fish species that use internal fertilization, the sperm does not fertilize the eggs but stimulates the growth of the eggs which develops into embryos.

=== Reptiles ===
Reptiles generally reproduce sexually, though some are capable of asexual reproduction. All reproductive activity occurs through the cloaca, the single exit/entrance at the base of the tail where waste is also eliminated. Most reptiles have copulatory organs, which are usually retracted or inverted and stored inside the body. In turtles and crocodilians, the male has a single median penis, while squamates, including snakes and lizards, possess a pair of hemipenes, only one of which is typically used in each session. Tuatara, however, lack copulatory organs, and so the male and female simply press their cloacas together as the male discharges sperm. Most reptiles lay amniotic eggs covered with leathery or calcareous shells.

Asexual reproduction has been identified in squamates in six families of lizards and one snake. In some species of squamates, a population of females is able to produce a unisexual diploid clone of the mother.

== Plants ==
Animals have life cycles with a single diploid multicellular phase that produces haploid gametes directly by meiosis. Male gametes are called sperm, and female gametes are called eggs or ova. In animals, fertilization of the ovum by a sperm results in the formation of a diploid zygote that develops by repeated mitotic divisions into a diploid adult. Plants have two multicellular life-cycle phases, resulting in an alternation of generations. Plant zygotes germinate and divide repeatedly by mitosis to produce a diploid multicellular organism known as the sporophyte. The mature sporophyte produces haploid spores by meiosis that germinate and divide by mitosis to form a multicellular gametophyte phase that produces gametes at maturity. The gametophytes of different groups of plants vary in size. Mosses and other pteridophytic plants may have gametophytes consisting of several million cells, while angiosperms have as few as three cells in each pollen grain.

=== Flowering plants ===
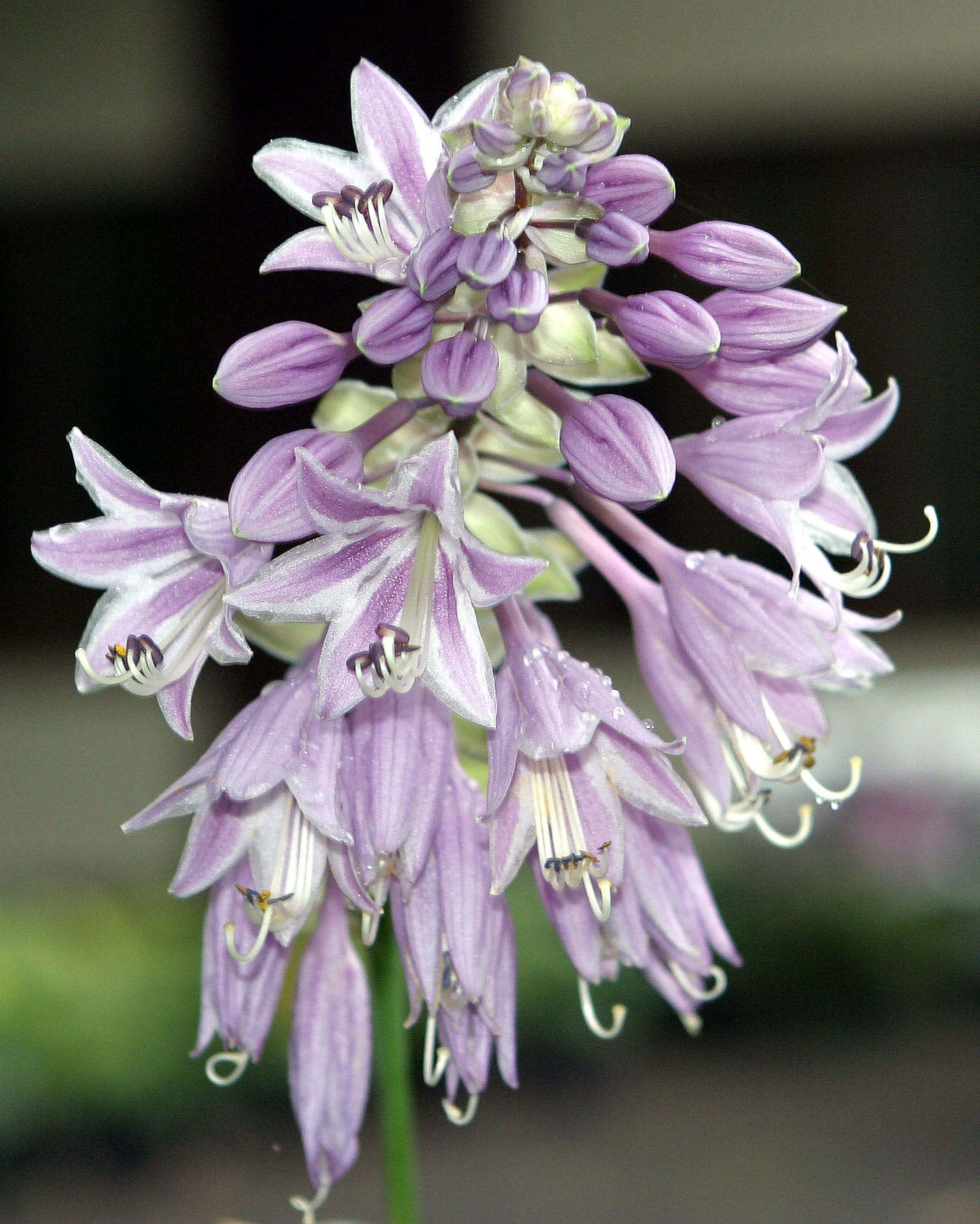
Flowers contain the sexual organs of flowering plants.

Flowering plants are the dominant plant form on land and they reproduce either sexually or asexually. Often their most distinctive feature is their reproductive organs, commonly called flowers. The anther produces pollen grains which contain the male gametophytes that produce sperm nuclei. For pollination to occur, pollen grains must attach to the stigma of the female reproductive structure (carpel), where the female gametophytes are located within ovules enclose within the ovary. After the pollen tube grows through the carpel's style, the sex cell nuclei from the pollen grain migrate into the ovule to fertilize the egg cell and endosperm nuclei within the female gametophyte in a process termed double fertilization. The resulting zygote develops into an embryo, while the triploid endosperm (one sperm cell plus two female cells) and female tissues of the ovule give rise to the surrounding tissues in the developing seed. The ovary, which produced the female gametophyte(s), then grows into a fruit, which surrounds the seed(s). Plants may either self-pollinate or cross-pollinate.

In 2013, flowers dating from the Cretaceous (100 million years before present) were found encased in amber, the oldest evidence of sexual reproduction in a flowering plant. Microscopic images showed tubes growing out of pollen and penetrating the flower's stigma. The pollen was sticky, suggesting it was carried by insects.

=== Ferns ===
Ferns produce large diploid sporophytes with rhizomes, roots and leaves. Fertile leaves produce sporangia that contain haploid spores. The spores are released and germinate to produce small, thin gametophytes that are typically heart shaped and green in color. The gametophyte prothalli, produce motile sperm in the antheridia and egg cells in archegonia on the same or different plants. After rains or when dew deposits a film of water, the motile sperm are splashed away from the antheridia, which are normally produced on the top side of the thallus, and swim in the film of water to the archegonia where they fertilize the egg. To promote out crossing or cross fertilization the sperm are released before the eggs are receptive of the sperm, making it more likely that the sperm will fertilize the eggs of different thallus. After fertilization, a zygote is formed which grows into a new sporophytic plant. The condition of having separate sporophyte and gametophyte plants is called alternation of generations.

=== Bryophytes ===
The bryophytes, which include liverworts, hornworts and mosses, reproduce both sexually and vegetatively. They are small plants found growing in moist locations and like ferns, have motile sperm with flagella and need water to facilitate sexual reproduction. These plants start as a haploid spore that grows into the dominant gametophyte form, which is a multicellular haploid body with leaf-like structures that photosynthesize. Haploid gametes are produced in antheridia (male) and archegonia (female) by mitosis. The sperm released from the antheridia respond to chemicals released by ripe archegonia and swim to them in a film of water and fertilize the egg cells thus producing a zygote. The zygote divides by mitotic division and grows into a multicellular, diploid sporophyte. The sporophyte produces spore capsules (sporangia), which are connected by stalks (setae) to the archegonia. The spore capsules produce spores by meiosis and when ripe the capsules burst open to release the spores. Bryophytes show considerable variation in their reproductive structures and the above is a basic outline. Also in some species each plant is one sex (dioicous) while other species produce both sexes on the same plant (monoicous).

== Fungi ==
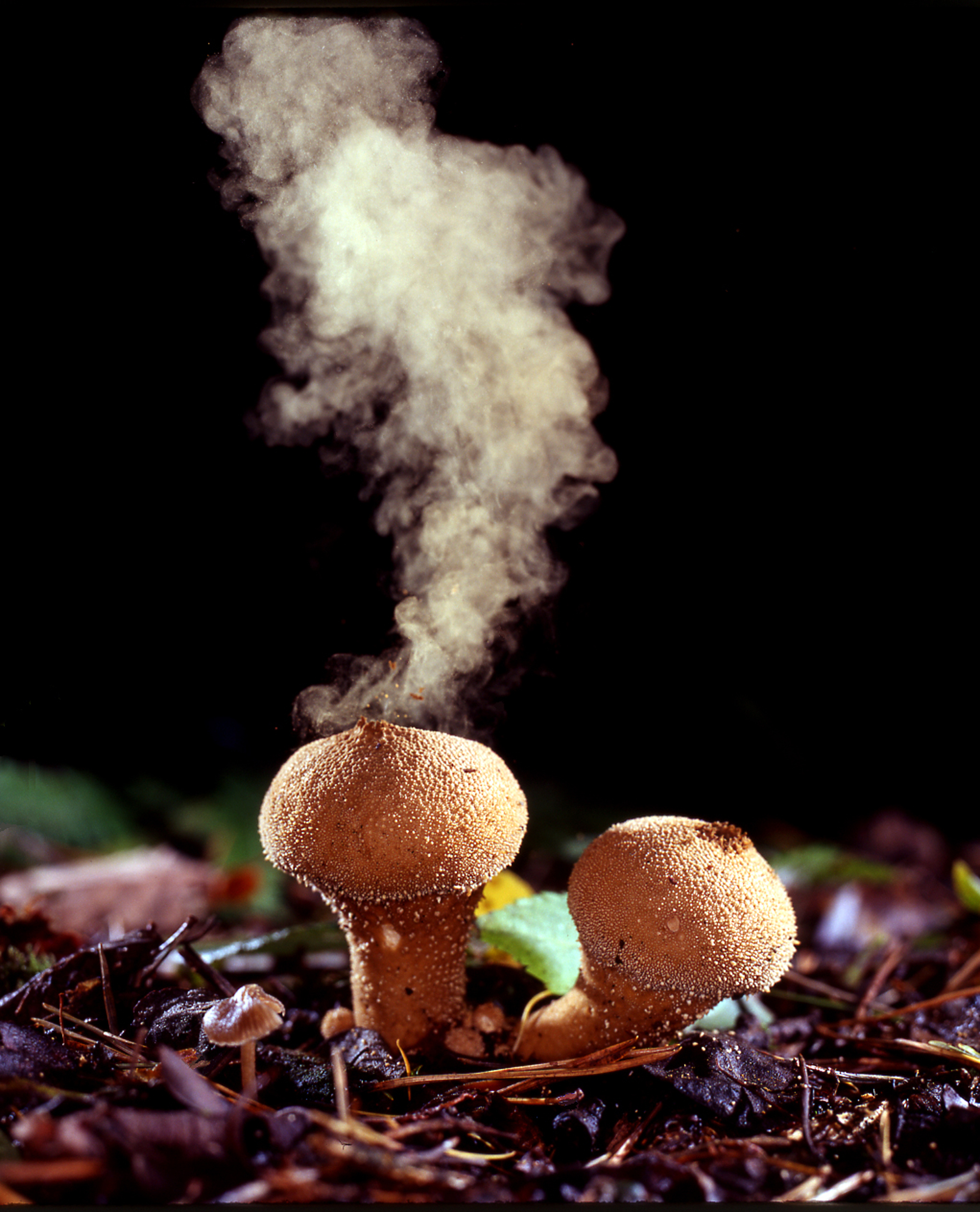
Puffballs emitting spores

Fungi are classified by the methods of sexual reproduction they employ. The outcome of sexual reproduction most often is the production of resting spores that are used to survive inclement times and to spread. There are typically three phases in the sexual reproduction of fungi: plasmogamy, karyogamy and meiosis. The cytoplasm of two parent cells fuse during plasmogamy and the nuclei fuse during karyogamy. New haploid gametes are formed during meiosis and develop into spores. The adaptive basis for the maintenance of sexual reproduction in the Ascomycota and Basidiomycota (dikaryon) fungi was reviewed by Wallen and Perlin. They concluded that the most plausible reason for maintaining this capability is the benefit of repairing DNA damage, caused by a variety of stresses, through recombination that occurs during meiosis.

== Bacteria and archaea ==
Three distinct processes in prokaryotes are regarded as similar to eukaryotic sex: bacterial transformation, which involves the incorporation of foreign DNA into the bacterial chromosome; bacterial conjugation, which is a transfer of plasmid DNA between bacteria, but the plasmids are rarely incorporated into the bacterial chromosome; and gene transfer and genetic exchange in archaea.

Bacterial transformation involves the recombination of genetic material and its function is mainly associated with DNA repair. Bacterial transformation is a complex process encoded by numerous bacterial genes, and is a bacterial adaptation for DNA transfer. This process occurs naturally in at least 40 bacterial species. For a bacterium to bind, take up, and recombine exogenous DNA into its chromosome, it must enter a special physiological state referred to as competence (see Natural competence). Sexual reproduction in early single-celled eukaryotes may have evolved from bacterial transformation, or from a similar process in archaea (see below).

On the other hand, bacterial conjugation is a type of direct transfer of DNA between two bacteria mediated by an external appendage called the conjugation pilus. Bacterial conjugation is controlled by plasmid genes that are adapted for spreading copies of the plasmid between bacteria. The infrequent integration of a plasmid into a host bacterial chromosome, and the subsequent transfer of a part of the host chromosome to another cell do not appear to be bacterial adaptations.

Exposure of hyperthermophilic archaeal Sulfolobus species to DNA damaging conditions induces cellular aggregation accompanied by high frequency genetic marker exchange Ajon et al. hypothesized that this cellular aggregation enhances species-specific DNA repair by homologous recombination. DNA transfer in Sulfolobus may be an early form of sexual interaction similar to the more well-studied bacterial transformation systems that also involve species-specific DNA transfer leading to homologous recombinational repair of DNA damage.

== See also ==
- Amphimixis (psychology)
- Androgenesis
- Anisogamy
- Biological reproduction
- Dioecy
- Heterosexuality
- Hermaphroditism
- Isogamy
- Mate choice
- Mating in fungi
- Operational sex ratio
- Outcrossing
- Allogamy
- Self-incompatibility
- Biological sex
- Sexual intercourse
- Transformation (genetics)
- Gynogenesis
