= Karl Abraham =

German psychoanalyst (1877–1925)

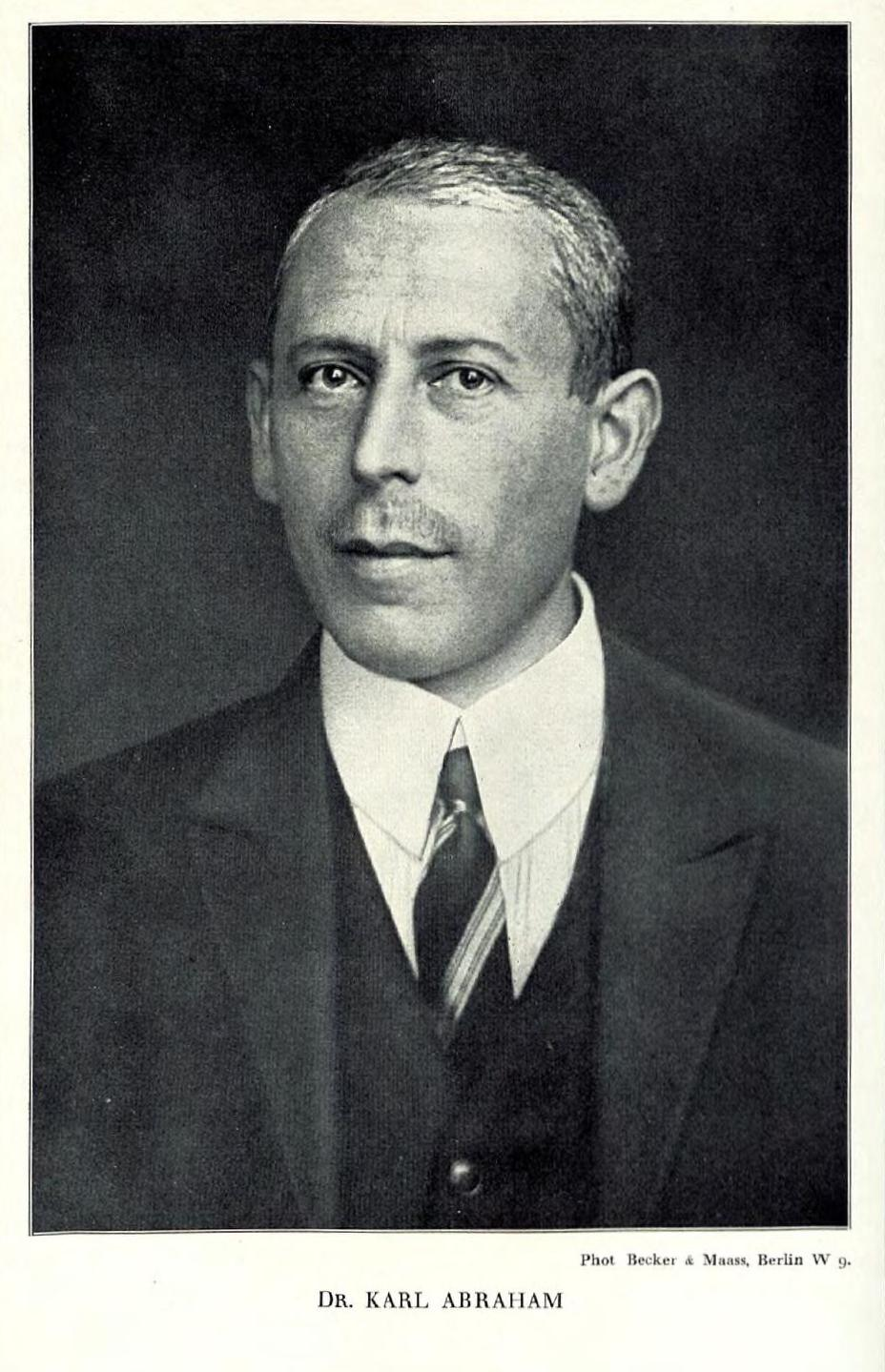
- Abraham, c. 1920
- Born: 3 May 1877; Bremen, German Empire
- Died: 25 December 1925 (aged 48); Berlin, Weimar Republic
- Scientific career
- Fields: Psychiatry

Karl Abraham (German: [ˈaːbʁaham]; 3 May 1877 – 25 December 1925) was an influential German psychoanalyst, and a collaborator of Sigmund Freud, who called him his 'best pupil'.

== Early life ==
Abraham was born in Bremen, Germany to a German-Jewish family. His parents were Nathan Abraham, a Jewish religion teacher (1842–1915) and his wife (and cousin) Ida (1847–1929). Abraham's studies in medicine enabled him to take a position at the Burghölzli Swiss Mental Hospital, where Eugen Bleuler practiced. The setting of this hospital initially introduced him to the psychoanalysis of Carl Gustav Jung.

== Collaborations ==
In 1907 Abraham had his first contact with Sigmund Freud, with whom he developed a lifetime relationship. Returning to Germany, he founded the Berliner Society of Psychoanalysis in 1910. He was the president of the International Psychoanalytical Association from 1914 to 1918 and again in 1925.

Karl Abraham collaborated with Freud on the understanding of manic-depressive illness, leading to Freud's paper on 'Mourning and Melancholia' in 1917. He was the analyst of Melanie Klein during the years 1924–1925, and of a number of other British psychoanalysts, including Edward Glover and Alix Strachey. He was a mentor for an influential group of German analysts, including Karen Horney, Helene Deutsch, and Franz Alexander.

Karl Abraham studied the role of infant sexuality in character development and mental illness and, like Freud, suggested that if psychosexual development is fixated at some point, mental disorders will likely emerge. He described the personality traits and psychopathology that result from the oral and anal stages of development (1921).

Abraham observed his only daughter, Hilda, reporting on her reaction to enemas and infantile masturbation by her brother. He asked that secrets be shared with him but he was careful to respect her privacy and some reports were not published until after Hilda's death. Hilda was later to become a psychoanalyst.

In the oral stage of development, the first relationships children have with objects (caretakers) determine their subsequent relationship to reality. Oral satisfaction can result in self-assurance and optimism, whereas oral fixation can lead to pessimism and depression. Moreover, persons with oral fixations will present a disinclination to take care of themselves and will require others to look after them. This may be expressed through extreme passivity (corresponding to the oral benign suckling substage) or through a highly active oral-sadistic behaviour (corresponding to the later sadistic biting substage).

In the anal stage, when the training in cleanliness starts too early, conflicts may result between a conscious attitude of obedience and an unconscious desire for resistance. This can lead to traits such as frugality, orderliness and obstinacy, as well as to obsessional neurosis as a result of anal fixation (Abraham, 1921). In addition, Abraham based his understanding of manic-depressive illness on the study of the painter Segantini: an actual event of loss is not itself a sufficient cause for the psychological disturbance involved in melancholic depression. This disturbance is linked with disappointing incidents of early childhood; in the case of men always with the mother (Abraham, 1911). This concept of the prooedipal “bad” mother was a new development in contrast to Freud’s oedipal mother and paved the way for the theories of Melanie Klein.

Another important contribution to psychoanalytic theory is Abraham's work “A short study of the Development of the Libido”, where he elaborated on Freud’s “Mourning and Melancholia” (1917) and demonstrated the vicissitudes of normal and pathological object relations and reactions to object loss.

Moreover, Abraham investigated child sexual trauma and, like Freud, proposed that sexual abuse was common among psychotic and neurotic patients. Furthermore, he argued (1907) that dementia praecox is associated with child sexual trauma, based on the relationship between hysteria and child sexual trauma demonstrated by Freud.

Abraham (1920) also showed interest in cultural issues. He analyzed various myths suggesting their relation to dreams (1909) and wrote an interpretation of the spiritual activities of the Egyptian monotheistic Pharaoh Amenhotep IV (1912).

== Death ==
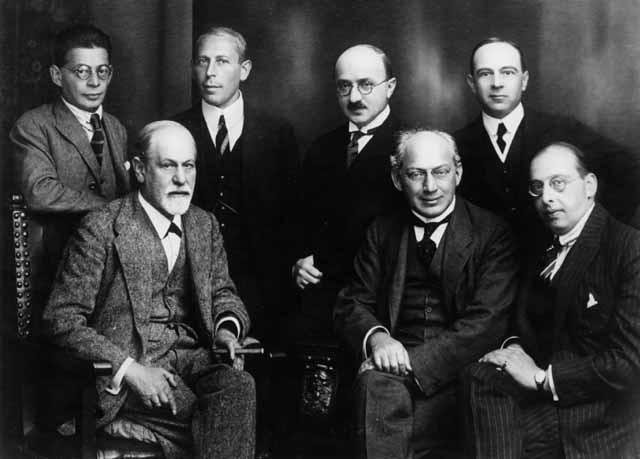
Left to right, seated: Sigmund Freud, Sándor Ferenczi, and Hanns Sachs. Standing; Otto Rank, Karl Abraham, Max Eitingon, and Ernest Jones. Photo 1922

Abraham died prematurely on December 25, 1925, from complications of a lung infection and may have suffered from lung cancer.

== Works and publications ==
- Normentafel zur Entwicklungsgeschichte des Huhnes (with Prof. Keibel). (1900) Normentafeln zur Entwicklungsgeschichte der Wirbeltiere, Heft 2. Jena.
- Beiträge zur Entwicklungsgeschichte des Wellensittichs. (inaugural dissertation.) (1901) Anatomische Blätter (Anatomical Institute, Freiburg), Heft LVI/LVII. (Wiesbaden, I. F. Bergmann.)
- Beiträge zur Kenntnis des Delirium tremens der Morphinisten. (1902) C., Jahrg. XXV, June, S. 369–80.
- ber Versuche mit 'Veronal' bei Erregungszuständen der Paralytiker. (1904) C., Jahrg.
- Abraham, K.(1907). On the significance of Sexual Trauma in Childhood for the Symptomatology of Dementia Praecox. In Hilda, C., Abraham, M.D.(Ed) (1955). Clinical Papers and Essays on Psycho-Analysis. London : The Hogarth Press and the Institute of Psychoanalysis.
- Abraham, K.(1909). Dreams and Myths : A study in folk-Psychology. In Hilda, C., Abraham, M.D.(Ed) (1955). Clinical Papers and Essays on Psycho-Analysis. London : The Hogarth Press and the Institute of Psychoanalysis.
- Abraham, K.(1911). Giovanni Segantini : A Psycho-analytical Study. In Hilda, C., Abraham, M.D.(Ed) (1955). Clinical Papers and Essays on Psycho-Analysis. London : The Hogarth Press and the Institute of Psychoanalysis.
- Abraham, K. (1912). Amenhotep IV. Psycho-analytical Contributions Towards the understanding of his Personality and of the Monotheistic Cult of Aton. . In Hilda, C., Abraham, M.D.(Ed) (1955). Clinical Papers and Essays on Psycho-Analysis. London : The Hogarth Press and the Institute of Psychoanalysis.
- Abraham, K. (1920). The Cultural Significance of Psycho-analysis. In Hilda, C., Abraham, M.D.(Ed) (1955). Clinical Papers and Essays on Psycho-Analysis. London : The Hogarth Press and the Institute of Psychoanalysis.
- Abraham, K (1921). Contributions to the theory of the anal character. In Stein, D.J, Stone, M. H. (Ed) (1997). Essential papers on obsessive-compulsive disorders. New York: New York University Press.
- Abraham, K The influence of oral erotism on character-formation. In Perzow, S. M., Kets de Vries, M.F.R. (Ed) (1991). Handbook of character studies: Psychoanalytic explorations. Madison, CT: International Universities Press.
- Abraham, K. A short study of the development of the libido. In Frankiel, R.V. (Ed) (1994). Essential papers on object loss, New York: New York University Press.
