= Todd Dufresne =

Canadian social and cultural theorist (born 1966)

Todd Dufresne (born 7 November 1966) is a Canadian social and cultural theorist best known for his work on Sigmund Freud and the history of psychoanalysis. He is Professor of Philosophy at Lakehead University in Thunder Bay, Ontario.

== Education and career ==
Dufresne (PhD Social & Political Thought, York University, Toronto) was a Post-Doctoral Fellow in the now defunct Psychoanalytic Thought Program at Trinity College, University of Toronto, before moving to Lakehead University in 1999. His administrative posts have included Chair of Philosophy, Interim Division Head of Human Sciences at the Northern Ontario School of Medicine, and Founding Director of The Advanced Institute for Globalization and Culture (aig+c). From 2008 to 2010 he was Research Chair of Social & Cultural Theory at Lakehead University, and from 2008 to 2011 he was an "affiliated scholar" at the Institute for the History and Philosophy of Science and Technology, University of Toronto. He teaches in the areas of Continental philosophy, film, cultural studies, and social and political philosophy.

== Bibliography ==
=== As author ===
Books

- The Democracy of Suffering: Life on the Edge of Catastrophe, Philosophy in the Anthropocene, McGill-Queen's University Press, 2019.
- The Late Sigmund Freud: Or The Last Word on Psychoanalysis, Society, & All the Riddles of Life, Cambridge: Cambridge University Press, 2017.
- Against Freud: Critics Talk Back, Stanford: Stanford University Press, 2007.
- Killing Freud: 20th Century Culture and the Death of Psychoanalysis, London/New York: Continuum, 2003/2006. Also published in Indonesian and Chinese translations.
- Tales From the Freudian Crypt: The Death Drive in Text and Context, preface by Mikkel Borch-Jacobsen, Stanford: Stanford University Press, 2000. Also published in Japanese translation (by Tokyo English professor Fuhito Endo).

Selected Essays

- "On Film, Theory, and 'Film as Philosophy': Or, Philosophy Goes 'Pop'," Film and Philosophy, vol. 15 (2011): 139–154.
- "Buying Andy Warhol: Review of The Philosophy of Andy Warhol," European Legacy, 13.2 (2008): 223–25.
- "Psychoanalysis Eats Its Own: Or, The Heretical Saint Roazen", Psychoanalysis and History, 9.1 (2007): 93–109.
- "After 'Beyond' Comes 'The Future': Freud's Absurdist Theatre of Reason," English Studies in Canada, 32.1 (March 2006): 27–43.

Edited Collections

- Sigmund Freud's Civilization and its Discontents, ed. intro. T Dufresne, trans. G Richter, Peterborough: Broadview Books, 2016.
- The Economy as Cultural System: Theory, Capitalism, Crisis, T. Dufresne and Clara Sacchetti, eds. London: Bloomsbury, 2012.
- Sigmund Freud's The Future of an Illusion, ed. and intro. T. Dufresne, trans. G. Richter, Peterborough: Broadview Books, 2012.
- Superior Art: Local Art in a Global Context, ed. C. Sacchetti, K. Picard, M. Nisenholt, T. Dufresne, Thunder Bay: Definitely Superior Art Gallery & Agency Books, 2012/2014.
- Sigmund Freud's Beyond the Pleasure Principle, ed. and intro. T. Dufresne, trans. G. Richter, Peterborough: Broadview Books, 2011.
- Against Freud: Critics Talk Back, Stanford: Stanford University Press, 2007
- Freud Under Analysis: History, Theory, Practice, edited and intro. T. Dufresne, Northvale N.J and London: Jason Aronson, 1997.
- Returns of the "French Freud": Freud, Lacan, & Beyond, edited and intro. T. Dufresne, New York and London: Routledge, 1997.

Selected Chapters

- "Frank Cioffi (1928-2012)." Oxford Dictionary of National Biography, Oxford University Press, 2016.
- "Future". In Fueling Culture: Energy, History, Politics, eds. Imre Szeman et al. Fordham University Press, 2016.
- "Sigmund Freud". In Oxford Bibliographies Online: Childhood Studies. ed. Heather K. Montgomery. New York: Oxford University Press, 2013.

Journal

- "Special Topic: After Psychoanalysis", Semiotic Review of Books, vol. 13.1 (2002).

=== Interviews ===
- Todd Dufresne and Tony Greco (2019). “For the Love of Wisdom: Climate Change and the Revenge of History”
- "Dr. Todd Dufresne on Freud's Looming Shadow of Deception" (2014), at Skeptico: Science at Tipping at the Tipping Point: https://skeptiko.com/235-todd-dufresne-freud-deception/
- "Interview with Todd Dufresne" (2015), at Figure/Ground

== See also ==
Books

- Freud: A Life for Our Time
- Growing Up Absurd
- Life Against Death
- The Freudian Fallacy

People

- Richard Webster (British author)

Book Reviews

- Ralph, Barnaby (2019). "'The Democracy of Suffering': Wit, Erudition and Philosophical Change". The Japan Times (October 6).
