= Aphanisis =

Psychoanalytic concept

In psychoanalytic theory, aphanisis (/əˈfænɪsɪs/; from the Greek ἀφάνισις aphanisis, "disappearance") is the disappearance of sexual desire. The etymology of the term refers to it as the absence of brilliance in the astronomical sense such as the fading or the disappearance of a star. Psychoanalyst Jacques Lacan used the term in reference to the fading or disappearance of the subject.

== Jones ==
According to the theories of Ernest Jones, who coined the term in 1927, aphanisis is the foundation of all neuroses. Jones suggested that fear of aphanisis was in both sexes more fundamental than castration anxiety, an argument he used against Sigmund Freud in their debate over female sexuality. Jones considered that the Oedipus complex confronted each sex with the threat of aphanisis, and the choice of giving up "either their sex or their incest".

Jones originally proposed aphanisis as a condition of female subjects based on their physiological characteristics. He stressed that women depend more, for physiological reasons, on men for their sexual satisfaction and that the loss of sexual desire is associated with abandonment. Jones subsequently linked aphanisis to Freud's concept of the trauma of separation, a point taken up by John Bowlby in the context of his own theory of separation anxiety.

== Lacan ==
Lacan adapted Jones's term to a new meaning: "aphanisis is to be situated in a more radical way at the level at which the subject manifests himself in this movement of disappearance...the fading of the subject". He diverged from Jones' theory by maintaining that this phenomenon does not have a purely physiological basis, arguing that it is in the plane of intersubjective desire based in the signifier.

In Lacanian theory, aphanisis describes the process through which a subject is partially eclipsed behind any signifier used to conceive of him/her: "when the subject appears somewhere as meaning, he is manifested elsewhere as 'fading', as disappearance...aphanisis". The subject as such is, accordingly, barred and riven by the Other (of language), a subject has no choice but to conceive of themself vis-a-vis something other than their self, something 'outside' or radically separated from them.

Because the Other is the sole means through which a 'subject' can be rendered thinkable, aphanisis, the disappearance or the fading of the subject behind any signifier used to conceive of it, is an essential concept for understanding subjectivity and the peril of the subject's fundamental emptiness.

Žižek developed the concept of aphanisis in terms of the dialectic of presence and absence—the gap between the core of the personality and the symbolic narrative in which the individual lives.

== Literary examples ==
Montaigne has been seen as a classic example of the exploration of the aphanisis of the subject.

== See also ==
- Abjection
- Anhedonia
- Attachment theory
- Gaze
- Objet petit a
