= Nina Searl =

English psychologist (1883–1955)

Mary Nina Searl (13 October 1883 – 26 February 1955) was an English psychologist and one of the earliest British child psychoanalysts, who came by way of the Brunswick Square Clinic to become a member of the British Psychoanalytical Society. She was analysed by Hanns Sachs.

Among her supervisees was John Bowlby while she also helped train D. W. Winnicott and Susan Isaacs.

== Early life and education ==
Searl was born in Forest Gate, Chippenham, Wiltshire. She was educated at Sidcup High School before entering the University of London in 1901.

== Theoretic contributions ==
During the twenties and thirties, Searl published a number of theoretical contributions, on subjects ranging from childhood stammering to depersonalization. She explored childhood phantasies of bodily destruction, as well as the repeated flight to reality where the individual seeks reassurance again and again that underlying fears are indeed imaginary, without ever reaching full reassurance.

Perhaps her most significant contribution was however her article on technique of 1936, which has been described as a neglected classic, anticipating much later work on ego resistance in analysis. While previously Searl had been closely associated with the movement around Melanie Klein, the article aroused considerable hostility from Kleinians, in a way anticipating the later Controversial discussions - hostility which ultimately resulted in Searl leaving the psychoanalytic movement.

Searl's downplaying of the role of theory in the article - "The function of theory is to help the analyst's weakness on extra-analytical occasion and is of use to the patient only in this indirect fashion" - may have contributed to this hostility; though again it can be seen as anticipating later positions such as those held by Joseph J. Sandler.

== Publications ==
- 'A Case of Stammering in a Child' International Journal of Psychoanalysis, VIII, 1927
- 'The Flight to Reality' IJP, X, 1929
- 'Danger Situations of the Immature Ego' IJP, X, 1929
- 'A Note on Depersonalization' IJP, XIII, 1932
- 'The Psychology of Screaming' IJP, XIV, 1933
- 'Freudian Light on Children's Behaviour' The New Era, XVII 1936
- 'Some Queries on Principles of Technique', IJP, XVII 1936
