= Paroxysmal attack =

Sudden intensification or recurrence of medical symptoms

- Other names: Paroxysms
- Specialty: Neurology

Paroxysmal attacks or paroxysms are a sudden recurrence or intensification of symptoms, such as a spasm or seizure. These short, frequent symptoms can be observed in various clinical conditions. They are usually associated with multiple sclerosis or pertussis, but they may also be observed in other disorders such as encephalitis, head trauma, stroke, autism, asthma, trigeminal neuralgia, breath-holding spells, epilepsy, malaria, tabes dorsalis, Behçet's disease, and paroxysmal nocturnal hemoglobinuria (PNH). It has also been noted as a symptom of gratification disorder in children.

The word paroxysm means 'sudden attack, outburst' and comes from Greek παροξυσμός (paroxusmós) 'irritation, exasperation'.

Paroxysmal attacks in various disorders have been reported extensively, and ephaptic coupling of demyelinated nerves has been presumed as one of the underlying mechanisms of this phenomenon. This is supported by the presence of these attacks in multiple sclerosis and tabes dorsalis, which both involve demyelination of spinal cord neurons. Exercise, tactile stimuli, hot water, anxiety, and neck flexion may provoke paroxysmal attacks. Most reported paroxysmal attacks are painful tonic spasms, dysarthria and ataxia, numbness, and hemiparesis. They are typically different from other transient symptoms by their brevity (lasting no more than 2 minutes), frequency (from 1–2 times/day up to a few hundred times/day), stereotyped fashion, and excellent response to drugs (usually carbamazepine). Withdrawal of symptoms without any residual neurological finding is another key feature in their recognition.

== See also ==
- BPPV
- Convulsion
- Female hysteria for "hysterical paroxysm"
- Relapse or remission, where symptoms become worse or better
