= Max Eitingon =

Belarusian-German medical doctor

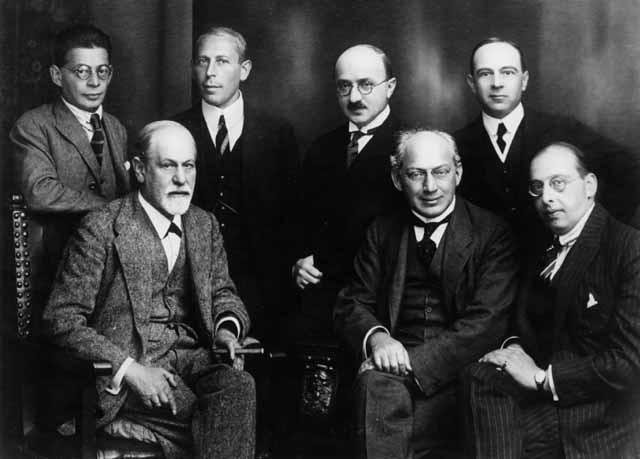
Psychoanalysts committee in 1922 (From left to right): Otto Rank, Sigmund Freud, Karl Abraham, Max Eitingon, Sándor Ferenczi, Ernest Jones, Hanns Sachs

Max Eitingon (German: [ˈaɪtɪŋɡɔn]; 26 June 1881 – 30 July 1943) was a German medical doctor and psychoanalyst, instrumental in establishing the institutional parameters of psychoanalytic education and training.

Eitingon was cofounder and president from 1920 to 1933 of the Berlin Psychoanalytic Polyclinic. He was also director and patron of the Internationaler Psychoanalytischer Verlag (1921–1930), president of the International Psychoanalytic Association (1927–1933), founder and president of the International Training Committee (1925–1943), and founder of the Palestine Psychoanalytic Society (1934) and of the Psychoanalytic Institute of Israel.

== Life ==
Eitingon was born to a wealthy Lithuanian Jewish family in Mohilev, Imperial Russia. He was the son of a successful fur trader Chaim Eitingon. When he was twelve the family moved to Leipzig. He studied at private school and at universities in Halle, Heidelberg, and Marburg — studying philosophy under the neo-Kantian Hermann Cohen — before studying medicine at the University of Leipzig in 1902.

Before completing his dissertation, Eitingon worked as an intern at the Burghölzli psychiatric hospital in Zurich, directed by Eugen Bleuler since 1898, where Carl Jung had been working since 1900. In 1907 Eitingon was sent by Bleuler to meet Freud, and in 1908–1909 underwent five weeks of analysis with Freud: "This was indeed the first training analysis!" He completed his dissertation, Effect of an epileptic attack on mental associations, with Carl Jung's help, and settled in Berlin. In 1913 he married Mirra Jacovleina Raigorodsky, an actress with the Moscow Art Theater.

During World War I Eitingon became an Austrian citizen, joining the army as a doctor and using hypnosis to treat soldiers with war trauma. Settling in Berlin after the war, he was invited by Freud to join the secret Psychoanalytic Committee. Eitingon financed the building of a polyclinic, using Freud's son Ernst Freud as architect. Eitingon, Karl Abraham and Ernst Simmel ran the clinic until the rise of Nazism in 1933. At the Budapest Congress in 1918, Hermann Nunberg had "declared that no one could any longer learn to practice psychoanalysis without having been analyzed himself": as Eitingon's 1922 report made clear, this rule was formalized in the practice of the Polyclinic:

We are all firmly convinced that henceforth no one who has not been analyzed must aspire to the rank of practising analyst. It follows that the analysis of a student himself is an essential part of the curriculum and takes place at the Poliklinik in the second half of the training period, after a time of intensive theoretical preparation by lectures and courses of instruction.

At the 1925 Bad Homburg Congress, Eitingon proposed that the Berlin system of psychoanalytic training should be made an international standard under an International Training Commission. Eitingon was appointed president of the ITC, and kept the position until his death in 1943.

After the family business suffered in the US Great Depression, Eitingon was forced for the first time to take a patient to earn his living. In 1932 he had a cerebral thrombosis. On Freud's advice, Eitingon left Germany in September 1933 and emigrated to Palestine. In 1934 he founded the Palestine Psychoanalytic Association in Jerusalem. However, despite Freud's recommendation, he did not manage to gain a chair in psychoanalysis at the Hebrew University of Jerusalem.

Max Eitingon was described in several books as an important figure in a group of Soviet agents who conducted assassinations in Europe and Mexico, including the murders of Ignace Reiss, General Yevgeny Miller, and Lev Sedov. The story was revived in The New York Times Book Review by Stephen Suleyman Schwartz, which resulted in a lengthy discussion between Schwartz, historians who wrote the books, and others who disputed the involvement of Eitingon in the team, such as Theodore Draper and Walter Laqueur. The discussion was concluded by Robert Conquest who noted that although there is no direct proof of involvement of Max Eitingon in the murders, his financial interests in the Soviet Union and connections with all key members of team, including his brother Leonid Eitingon, Nadezhda Plevitskaya, and Nikolai Skoblin who acted as an intermediary between NKVD and Gestapo in Tukhachevsky affair, are grounds for suspicion.

Eitingon died on 30 July 1943 in Jerusalem, and is buried on Mount Scopus.

== Works ==
- 'Genie, Talent und Psychoanalyse', Zentralblatt für Psychoanalyse 2 (1912) 539–540.
- 'Gott und Vater', Imago 3 (1914), 90–93
- 'Ein Fall von Verlesen', Internationale Zeitschrift für Psychoanalyse 3 (1915), 349–350.
- 'Zur psychoanalytischen Bewegung', Internationale Zeitschrift für Psychoanalyse 8 (1922), 103–106.
- 'Report of the Berlin Psychoanalytical Polyclinic', Bulletin of the International Psychoanalytical Association 4 (1923), 254.
- 'Concluding remarks on the question of lay analysis', International Journal of Psycho-Analysis 8 (1927), p. 399–401
- 'Report of Marienbad Congress', International Journal of Psycho-Analysis 18 (1937), p. 351
- 'In the Dawn of Psychoanalysis', in M. Wulff (ed.) Max Eitingon: in memoriam, Jerusalem: Israel Psychoanalytic Society, 1950

== See also ==
- Nahum Eitingon
