= Holier-than-thou =

A "holier-than-thou" attitude is a form of self-righteousness. The phrase originates from Isaiah 65:5 in the King James Bible, which says (spelling modernized): “Stand by thyself, come not near to me; for I am holier than thou”

Holier Than Thou may also refer to:

- Holier Than Thou (fanzine), a science fiction fanzine
- "Holier Than Thou" (song), a song by Metallica from their self-titled album, 1991
