= The Life and Work of Sigmund Freud =

1953–1957 book by Ernest Jones

- Cover of volume one of the first edition
- Author: Ernest Jones
- Language: English
- Subject: Sigmund Freud
- Publisher: Basic Books
- Publication date: 1953; 1961 (abridged edition)
- Publication place: United States
- Media type: Print (hardback and paperback)
- Pages: 428 (vol. 1); 512 (vol. 2); 537 (vol. 3); 670 (abridged edition)
- ISBN: 978-0140170856

The Life and Work of Sigmund Freud is a biography of Sigmund Freud by the psychoanalyst Ernest Jones.
