= Amphimixis (psychology) =

In psychoanalytic theory, amphimixis is the merging of pleasure-centres into an amorphous unity. The concept was proposed by Sandor Ferenczi, a student and associate of Sigmund Freud.

== Overview ==
Sandor Ferenczi introduced the term into psychoanalysis in Thalassa (1924), where he used it to describe the process of merging of the partial drives to create a diffuse state of infant and childhood pleasure. Ferenczi's idea was developed by Helene Deutsch in her description of female sexuality. The concept was criticised by Michael Balint for conflating forepleasure and end pleasure.

Neville Symington extended the concept of amphimixis to include a central pleasure centre in the self, which provided the erotic basis for the self-love (amour propre) of the narcissist.

== See also ==
- Oral stage
- Phallic monism
- Psychosexual development
