= Clayton J. Whisnant =

Clayton J. Whisnant is Chapman Professor of the Humanities and European History at Wofford College.

== Works ==
- Whisnant, Clayton J. (2012). Male Homosexuality in West Germany: Between Persecution and Freedom, 1945-69. Springer. ISBN 978-1-137-02834-1.
- Whisnant, Clayton J. (2016). Queer Identities and Politics in Germany: A History, 1880–1945. Columbia University Press. ISBN 978-1-939594-10-5.
