= Gratification disorder =

Form of sexual behavior

Gratification Disorder
- Other names: Infantile masturbation, benign idiopathic infantile dyskinesia, infantile gratification
- Specialty: Pediatric psychiatry, pediatric neurology, child sexuality
- Symptoms: Vocalizations with quiet grunting, flushing of the face, sweating, crossing or flexing legs
- Duration: Variable
- Causes: No known causes
- Diagnostic method: Based on symptoms, presence of consciousness, and stopping upon distraction

Gratification disorder is an often misdiagnosed form of masturbatory behavior, or the behavior of stimulating of one's own genitals, seen predominantly in infants and toddlers. Most pediatricians agree that masturbation is both normal and common behavior in children at some point in their childhood. The behavior is labeled a disorder when the child forms a habit, and misdiagnoses of the behavior can lead to unnecessary and invasive testing for other severe health conditions, including multiple neurological or motor disorders.

== Signs and symptoms ==
The behavior of gratification disorder closely mimics that of a seizure, though the exact appearance varies. It often involves symptoms of flushing, or when the skin of the face becomes red, sweating, grunting, and erratic movements of the body. The child remains conscious during episodes of infantile masturbation and can be distracted from the behavior, which could help rule out the suspicion of a serious condition. Additional symptoms can include: rhythmic or rhythmical rubbing of genitals against objects or hands; a fixated or dazed gaze; straightening of the legs or crossed legs; and a pleasant feeling post-episode.

Duration and frequency of the episodes vary from as little as 5–10 minutes, to episodes reported to last 30–40 minutes. Some episodes occur weekly, while other reports document episodes occurring multiple times throughout a single day. In general, parents of children affected by gratification disorder noted an increase in both duration and frequency as time went on before an intervention, or remedy, such as behavioral therapy was introduced.

Because this behavior can be worrisome, the possibility of sexual abuse to the child should be thoroughly examined by parents and/or health care professionals to help determine that this is not the likely reason for this behavior. This masturbatory behavior tends to diminish with age, and as of 2023, there were no clinical trials that explore medical approaches or defined treatment options for gratification disorder.

== Diagnosis ==
Gratification disorder may be unrecognized by both families and clinicians, possibly due to the absence of genital manipulation or physical touching of the genitals. Because of the inability to correctly recognize and diagnose gratification disorder, children are put at higher risk for more invasive testing because the disorder and its characteristics are largely misunderstood. Failure to correctly diagnose can lead to an increased risk of unnecessary testing or the use of potentially harmful medications, such as medications used for seizures or other neurological disorders.

=== Differential diagnosis ===
Little research has been published regarding this early childhood condition, but it is likely misdiagnosed when the child's bodily movements are of concern. The behavior can look different from case to case and does not always involve direct stimulation of the genitals, so the movements exhibited by the child can also resemble conditions such as epilepsy, a neurological condition that causes unprovoked and recurrent seizures; paroxysmal dystonia, a neurological disorder causing episodes of spastic movements that cause muscles to contract involuntarily; dyskinesia, a disorder involving the involuntary contraction of muscles; and gastrointestinal disorders, which would be health issues relating to the stomach or GI tract.

A strategy for differentiating gratification disorder, or infantile masturbation, from other movement disorders or seizure disorders is via direct observation. Usually in cases of gratification disorder, the physical and laboratory examination results are normal. Consciousness is also not altered in gratification disorder, which can be another key element in the differential diagnosis. Children with gratification disorder are likely responsive and should stop an episode upon distraction, which is not something that would be seen in movement or seizure disorders. Several studies stress the importance of direct observation and identifying features of gratification disorder to prevent unnecessary invasive testing and diagnoses.

== Epidemiology ==
Most instances of gratification disorder occur from the ages of 3 months to 3 years but it can sometimes resurface in older adolescence.
