= Sándor Ferenczi =

Hungarian psychoanalyst (1873–1933)

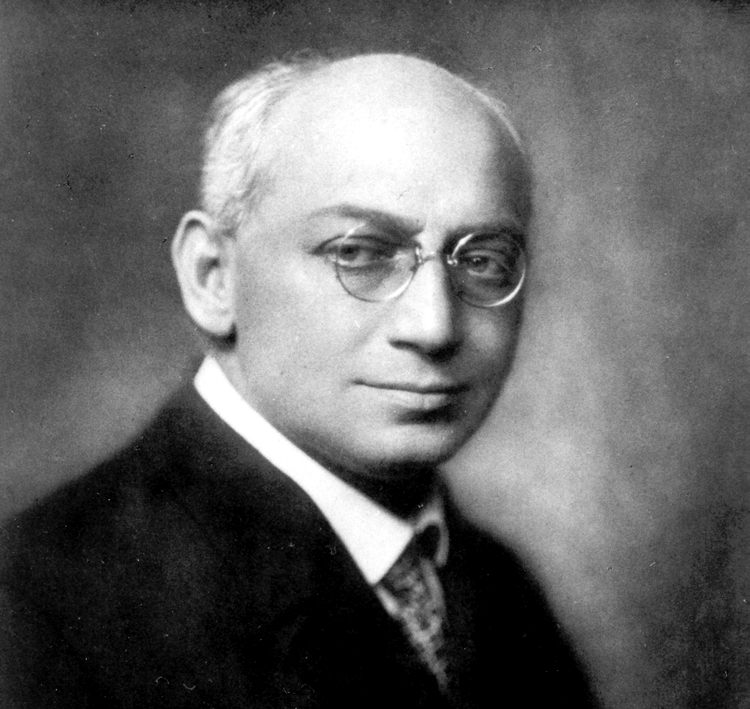
- Born: Sándor Fraenkel; 7 July 1873; Miskolc, Austria-Hungary
- Died: 22 May 1933 (aged 59); Budapest, Hungary
- Citizenship: Hungary
- Known for: Budapest School of Psychoanalysis, identification with the aggressor, regressus ad uterum
- Scientific career
- Fields: Psychoanalysis
- Workplaces: International Psychoanalytical Association (president); Hungarian Psychoanalytical Society (founder)

Sándor Ferenczi (Hungarian: [ˈʃaːndor ˈfɛrɛntsi]; 7 July 1873 – 22 May 1933) was a Hungarian psychoanalyst. Ferenczi was a key theorist of the psychoanalytic school and a close associate of Sigmund Freud.

== Biography ==
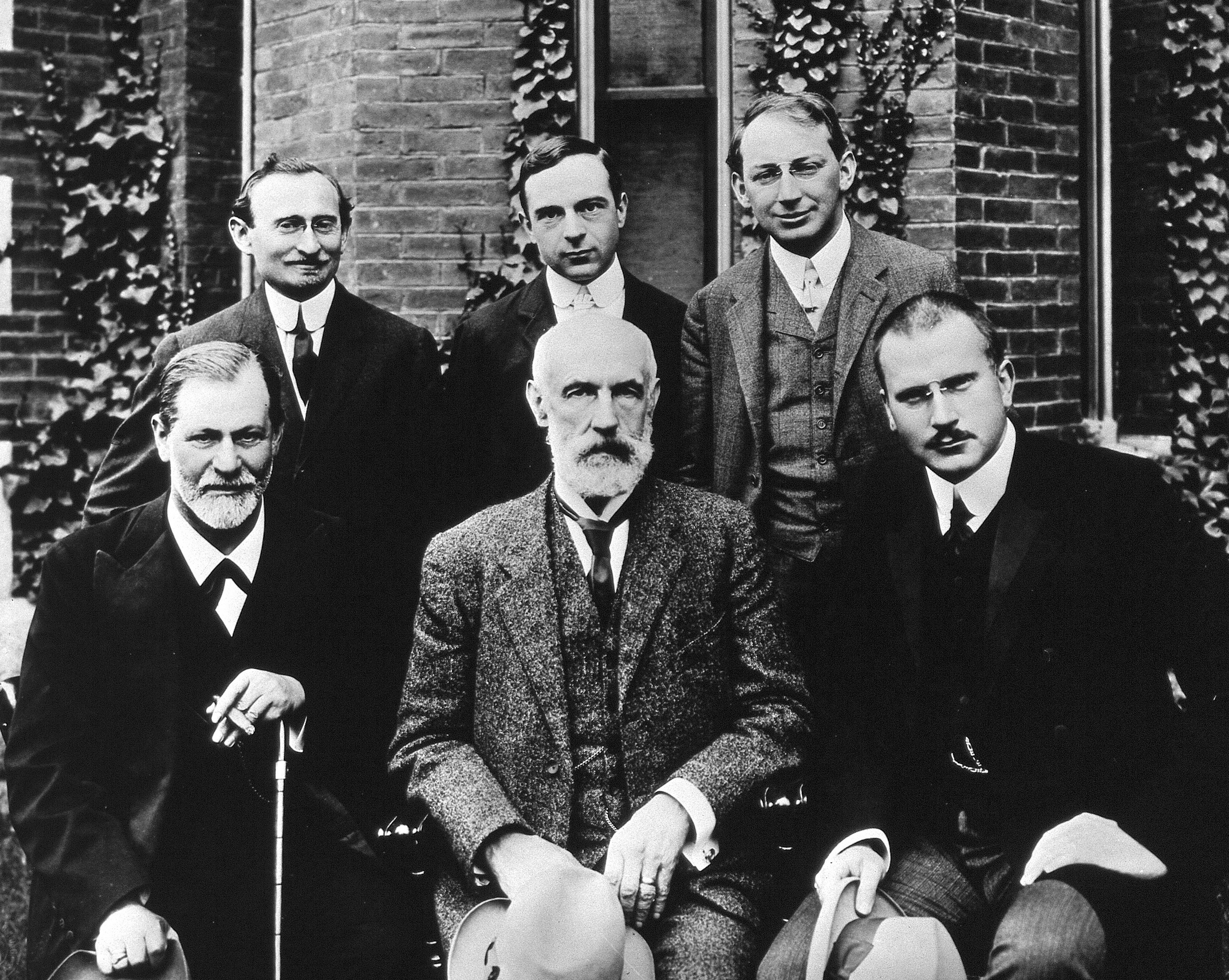
At Clark University in 1909. Front row: Sigmund Freud, G. Stanley Hall, Carl Jung; back row: Abraham A. Brill, Ernest Jones, Ferenczi.

Born Sándor Fraenkel to Baruch Fränkel and Rosa Eibenschütz (both Polish-Jewish émigrés). His family later magyarized their surname to Ferenczi.

As a result of his psychiatric work, he came to believe that his patients' accounts of sexual abuse as children were truthful, having verified those accounts through other patients in the same family. This was a major reason for his eventual disputes with Sigmund Freud.

Prior to this conclusion, he was notable as a psychoanalyst for working with the most difficult of patients and for developing a theory of more active intervention than is usual for psychoanalytic practice. During the early 1920s, criticizing Freud's "classical" method of neutral interpretation, Ferenczi collaborated with Otto Rank to create a "here-and-now" psychotherapy that, through Rank's personal influence, led the American Carl Rogers to conceptualize person-centered therapy.

Ferenczi has found some favour in modern times among the followers of Jacques Lacan as well as among relational psychoanalysts in the United States. Relational analysts read Ferenczi as anticipating their own clinical emphasis on mutuality (intimacy), intersubjectivity, and the importance of the analyst's countertransference. Ferenczi's work has strongly influenced theory and praxis of the interpersonal-relational theory of American psychoanalysis, as typified by psychoanalysts at the William Alanson White Institute.

Ferenczi was president of the International Psychoanalytical Association from 1918 to 1919.

Ernest Jones, a biographer of Freud, termed Ferenczi as "mentally ill" at the end of his life, famously ignoring Ferenczi's struggle with pernicious anemia, which killed him in 1933. Though desperately ill with the then-untreatable disease, Ferenczi managed to deliver his most famous paper, "Confusion of Tongues" to the 12th International Psycho-Analytic Congress in Wiesbaden, Germany, on 4 September 1932.

Ferenczi's reputation was revived in 2002 by publication of Disappearing and Reviving: Sandor Ferenczi in the History of Psychoanalysis. One of the book's chapters dealt with the nature of the relationship between Freud and Ferenczi.

== Ferenczi's main ideas ==
=== Activity in psychoanalytic therapy ===
Contrary to Freud's opinion of therapeutic abstinence, Ferenczi advocated a more active role for the analyst. For example, instead of the relative "passivity" of a listening analyst encouraging the patient to freely associate, Ferenczi used to curtail certain responses, verbal and non-verbal alike, on the part of the analysand so as to allow suppressed thoughts and feelings to emerge. Ferenczi (1994) described in a case study how he used a kind of behavioral activation (uncommon in the psychoanalytic therapy at that time) when he asked an opera singer with performance anxiety to "perform" during a therapy session and in this way to struggle with her fears.

=== Clinical empathy in psychoanalysis ===
Ferenczi believed the empathic response during therapy was the basis of clinical interaction. He based his intervention on responding to the subjective experience of the analysand. If the more traditional opinion was that the analyst had the role of a physician, administering a treatment to the patient based upon diagnostic judgment of psychopathology, Ferenczi wanted the analysand to become a co-participant in an encounter created by the therapeutic dyad. This emphasis on empathic reciprocity during the therapeutic encounter was an important contribution to the evolution of psychoanalysis. Ferenczi also believed that self-disclosure of the analyst is an important therapeutic reparative force. The practice of including the therapist's personality in therapy resulted in the development of the idea of mutual encounter: the therapist is allowed to discuss some content from his/her own life and thoughts, as long as it is relevant to the therapy. This is in contrast to the Freudian therapeutic abstinence according to which the therapist should not involve his/her personal life with the therapy, and should remain neutral. The mutual encounter is a precedent for the psychoanalytic theory of two-person psychology.

=== The "confusion of tongues" theory of trauma ===
Ferenczi believed that the persistent traumatic effect of chronic overstimulation, deprivation, or empathic failure (a term further elaborated by Heinz Kohut) during childhood is what causes neurotic, character, borderline and psychotic disorders. According to this concept, trauma develops as a result of the sexual seduction of a child by a parent or authority figure. The confusion of tongues occurs when the child pretends to be the spouse of the parent. The pathological adult interprets this infantile and innocent game according to his adult "passion tongue" and then forces the child to conform to his passion tongue. The adult uses a tongue the child does not know, and interprets the child's innocent game (his infantile tongue) according to his disturbed perspective. For example, a father is playing with his little girl. During their common game, she offers him the role of her husband and wants him to sleep with her just as he sleeps with her mother. The pathological father misinterprets this childish offer, and touches his daughter in an inappropriate manner while they are in bed together. Here, the child spoke her innocent childish tongue, and the father interpreted her offer with his passionate adult sexual tongue. The adult also attempts to convince the child that the lust on his part is really the love for which the child yearns. Ferenczi generalized the idea of trauma to emotional neglect, physical maltreatment, and empathic failure. The prominent manifestation of these disturbances would be the sexual abuse.

A Lacanian reading of Ferenczi's 'Confusion of Tongues' was published in 2018 by Miguel Gutiérrez-Peláez. Raluca Soreanu has investigated the metapsychological implications of 'Confusion of Tongues' the Clinical Diary for a theory of psychic splitting.

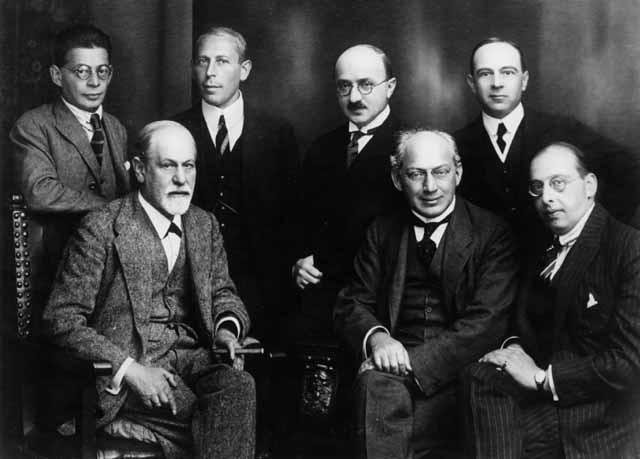
Left to right, seated: Sigmund Freud, Sándor Ferenczi, and Hanns Sachs. Standing; Otto Rank, Karl Abraham, Max Eitingon, and Ernest Jones. Photo 1922

=== Regressus ad uterum ===
In Thalassa: A Theory of Genitality (German: Versuch einer Genitaltheorie, 1924), Ferenczi suggested that the wish to return to the womb (Latin: regressus ad uterum) and the comfort of its amniotic fluids symbolizes a wish to return to the origin of life, the sea. This idea of an "uterine and thalassal regression" became a feature of the so-called Budapest School, up to the disciple Michael Balint and his 1937 paper on "Primary [Object-]Love". According to Ferenczi, all forms of human practice, especially sex, were an attempt to reestablish genitalia with the intrauterine experience – a theory which resonated with architect Richard Neutra and may have inspired, or supplemented, Neutra's fascination with uterine suspension. At the same time, Thalassa is embedded in discourses of popular biology, which are reinterpreted by Ferenczi by using psychoanalytic models. Far from simply leaning on Ernst Haeckel, Wilhelm Bölsche, and post-Lamarckism to bolster the psychoanalytic paradigm, Ferenczi defamiliarizes these popular discourses just at a time when they were starting to inform eugenicist projects.

== In popular culture ==
Karl Graboshas portrays Ferenczi in episode 13 of season 15 "Murdoch on the Couch" (10 January 2022) of the Canadian television period detective series Murdoch Mysteries.

== See also ==
- Amphimixis
- Identification with the aggressor
- Little Arpad
- Narcissistic abuse
- Otto Rank
