= Hanns Sachs =

Austrian psychoanalyst (1881-1947)

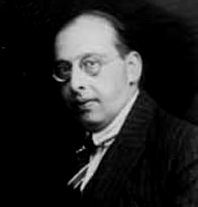
Hanns Sachs

Hanns Sachs (German: [zaks]; 10 January 1881, in Vienna – 10 January 1947, in Boston) was one of the earliest psychoanalysts, and a close personal friend of Sigmund Freud. He became a member of Freud's Secret Committee of six in 1912, Freud describing him as one "in whom my confidence is unlimited in spite of the shortness of our acquaintance".

In 1939, he founded American Imago.

== Life and career ==
Born into an Austrian-Jewish family the son of a lawyer, Sachs was himself practicing as a lawyer in the early twentieth century when he began following Freud's lectures at the University of Vienna: he finally made himself known to Freud and joined the Wednesday Psychological Society by 1910. He presented a paper to the Congress of 1911, and in 1912 began co-editing the journal Imago on non-medical applications of psychoanalysis.

Refused for army service due to short-sightedness, Sachs spent much of the war helping Freud continue to produce psychoanalytic journals, and in 1919 he decided to change from law to (lay) analysis, practicing in Berlin from 1920 onwards. Among the analysts he helped train were Nina Searl and Erich Fromm, Rudolf Loewenstein and Michael Balint.

With the rise of Hitler, Sachs moved from Berlin to Boston in 1932, but remained in close contact with Freud himself: at the latter's deathbed in 1939, he said to Sachs that "I know I have at least one friend in America". He published an affectionate memoir of Freud (which Freud's biographer Peter Gay deemed indispensable) in 1945.

Ernest Jones, who considered Sachs his closest friend among the Viennese, adjudged him both the wittiest and the most apolitical of Freud's inner circle.

== Theoretical contributions ==
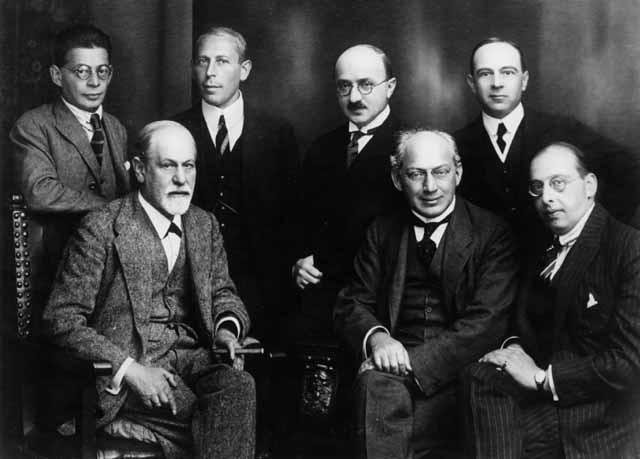
Left to right, seated: Sigmund Freud, Sándor Ferenczi, and Hanns Sachs. Standing; Otto Rank, Karl Abraham, Max Eitingon, and Ernest Jones. Photo 1922

Sachs' first analytic publication, on the subject of dreams (1912) was cited by Freud in his study of group psychology, as was his later study of 1920 on 'The Community of Daydreams'. In the latter, Sachs explored the role of relieving guilt feelings provided by the sharing of daydreams in children, and of art experiences in adults.

His study of Caligula emphasised the shifting characters of those dominated by fleeting and unstable identifications. His work on the female superego stressed the importance/difficulty of desexualising the superego incorporation of the father.

Sachs was also interested in film and psychoanalysis, and published on their connection in Close Up.

== English publications ==
- Hanns Sachs, 'The Community of Daydreams', in The Creative Unconscious (1942)
- Hanns Sachs, 'One of the Motive Factors in the Formation of the Superego in Women', International Journal of Psychoanalysis X 1929
- Hanns Sachs, Caligula (1930)
- Hanns Sachs, Freud, Master and Friend (1945)
- Hanns Sachs, Masks of Love and Life (1948)

== See also ==
- Karl Abraham
- Max Eitingon
- Sándor Ferenczi
- Otto Rank
- Elvin Semrad
