= Ernest Jones (psychoanalyst) =

Welsh neurologist, psychiatrist and psychoanalyst (1879–1958)

Ernest Jones FRCP
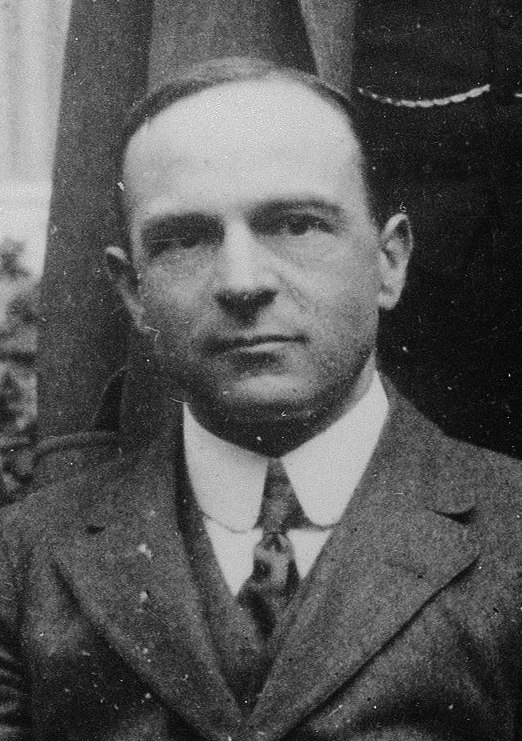
- Jones in 1909
- Born: Alfred Ernest Jones; 1 January 1879; Gowerton, Wales
- Died: 11 February 1958 (aged 79); London, England
- Education: University College London
- Spouses: Morfydd Llwyn Owen (m. 1917; died 1918); Katharina Jokl (m. 1919)
- Scientific career
- Fields: Neurology; psychiatry; psychoanalysis

Alfred Ernest Jones (1 January 1879 – 11 February 1958) was a Welsh neurologist and psychoanalyst. A lifelong friend and colleague of Sigmund Freud from their first meeting in 1908, he became his official biographer. Jones was the first English-speaking practitioner of psychoanalysis and became its leading exponent in the English-speaking world. As President of both the International Psychoanalytical Association and the British Psycho-Analytical Society in the 1920s and 1930s, Jones exercised a formative influence in the establishment of their organisations, institutions and publications.

== Early life and career ==
Ernest Jones was born in Gowerton (formerly Ffosfelin), Wales, an industrial village on the outskirts of Swansea, the first child of Thomas and Ann Jones. His father was a self-taught colliery engineer who went on to establish himself as a successful businessman, becoming accountant and company secretary at the Elba Steelworks in Gowerton. His mother, Mary Ann (née Lewis), was from a Welsh-speaking Carmarthenshire family which had relocated to Swansea. Jones was educated at Swansea Grammar School, Llandovery College, and Cardiff University in Wales. Jones studied at University College London and meanwhile he obtained the Conjoint diplomas LRCP and MRCS in 1900. A year later, in 1901, he obtained an M.B. degree with honours in medicine and obstetrics. Within five years he received an MD degree and a Membership of the Royal College of Physicians (MRCP) in 1903. He was particularly pleased to receive the University's gold medal in obstetrics from his distinguished fellow-Welshman, Sir John Williams.

After obtaining his medical degrees, Jones specialised in neurology and took a number of posts in London hospitals. It was through his association with the surgeon Wilfred Trotter that Jones first heard of Freud's work. Having worked together as surgeons at University College Hospital, he and Trotter became close friends, with Trotter taking the role of mentor and confidant to his younger colleague. They had in common a wide-ranging interest in philosophy and literature, as well as a growing interest in Continental psychiatric literature and the new forms of clinical therapy it surveyed. By 1905 they were sharing accommodation above Harley Street consulting rooms with Jones's sister, Elizabeth, installed as housekeeper. Trotter and Elizabeth Jones later married. Appalled by the treatment of the mentally ill in institutions, Jones began experimenting with hypnotic techniques in his clinical work.

Jones first encountered Freud's writings directly in 1905, in a German psychiatric journal in which Freud published the famous Dora case-history. It was thus he formed "the deep impression of there being a man in Vienna who actually listened with attention to every word his patients said to him...a revolutionary difference from the attitude of previous physicians..."

Jones's early attempts to combine his interest in Freud's ideas with his clinical work with children resulted in adverse effects on his career. In 1906 he was arrested and charged with two counts of indecent assault on two adolescent girls whom he had interviewed in his capacity as an inspector of schools for "mentally defective" children. At the court hearing Jones maintained his innocence, claiming the girls were fantasising about any inappropriate actions by him. The magistrate concluded that no jury would believe the testimony of such children and Jones was acquitted. (Note: At that time, Jones was in a particularly turbulent mental state. Demoralised by his failure to secure a position appropriate to his outstanding qualifications, he was also powerfully sexually attracted to his then client, Loe Kann. Notwithstanding Jones's acquittal, his biographer Maddox suggests that Jones may have suffered a "loss of self-restraint" during his interviews of the adolescent girls.) In 1908, employed as a pathologist at a London hospital, Jones accepted a colleague's challenge to demonstrate the repressed sexual memory underlying the hysterical paralysis of a young girl's arm. Jones duly obliged but, before conducting the interview, he omitted to inform the girl's consultant or arrange for a chaperone. Subsequently, he faced complaints from the girl's parents over the nature of the interview and he was forced to resign his hospital post.

== Personal life ==
Jones's first serious relationship was with Loe Kann, a wealthy Dutch émigré referred to him in 1906 after she had become addicted to morphine during treatment for a serious kidney condition. Their relationship lasted until 1913. It ended with Kann in analysis with Freud and Jones, at Freud's behest, undergoing analysis with Sándor Ferenczi.

A tentative romance with Freud's daughter, Anna, did not survive the disapproval of her father. Before her visit to Britain in the autumn of 1914, which Jones chaperoned, Freud advised him:

She does not claim to be treated as a woman, being still far away from sexual longings and rather refusing man. There is an outspoken understanding between me and her that she should not consider marriage or the preliminaries before she gets 2 or 3 years older.

In 1917, Jones married the Welsh musician Morfydd Llwyn Owen. They were holidaying in South Wales the following year when Morfydd became ill with acute appendicitis. Jones hoped to get his former colleague and brother-in-law, the leading surgeon Wilfred Trotter, to operate but when this proved impossible emergency surgery was carried out at his father's Swansea home by a local surgeon, with chloroform administered as the anaesthetic. As Jones recounts: "after a few days [she] became delirious with a high temperature. We thought there was blood poisoning till I got Trotter from London. He at once recognized delayed chloroform poisoning ... We fought hard, and there were moments when we seemed to have succeeded, but it was too late." Jones arranged for his wife to be buried in Oystermouth Cemetery on the outskirts of Swansea with her gravestone bearing an inscription from Goethe's Faust: Das Unbeschreibliche, hier ist's getan. (Note: The Goethe text translates as "Here the indescribable is done.")

In 1919, following some inspired matchmaking by his Viennese colleagues, Jones met and married Katherine Jokl, a Jewish economics graduate from Moravia. She had been at school in Vienna with Freud's daughters. They had four children in what proved to be a long and happy marriage, though both struggled to overcome the loss of their eldest child, Gwenith, at the age of seven, a casualty of the interwar influenza epidemics. Their son Mervyn Jones became a writer.

== Psychoanalytical career ==
Whilst attending a congress of neurologists in Amsterdam in 1907, Jones met Carl Jung, from whom he received a first-hand account of the work of Freud and his circle in Vienna. Confirmed in his judgement of the importance of Freud's work, Jones joined Jung in Zürich to plan the inaugural Psychoanalytical Congress. This was held in 1908 in Salzburg, where Jones met Freud for the first time. Jones travelled to Vienna for further discussions with Freud and introductions to the members of the Vienna Psychoanalytic Society. Thus began a personal and professional relationship which, to the acknowledged benefit of both, would survive the many dissensions and rivalries which marked the first decades of the psychoanalytic movement, and would last until Freud's death in 1939.

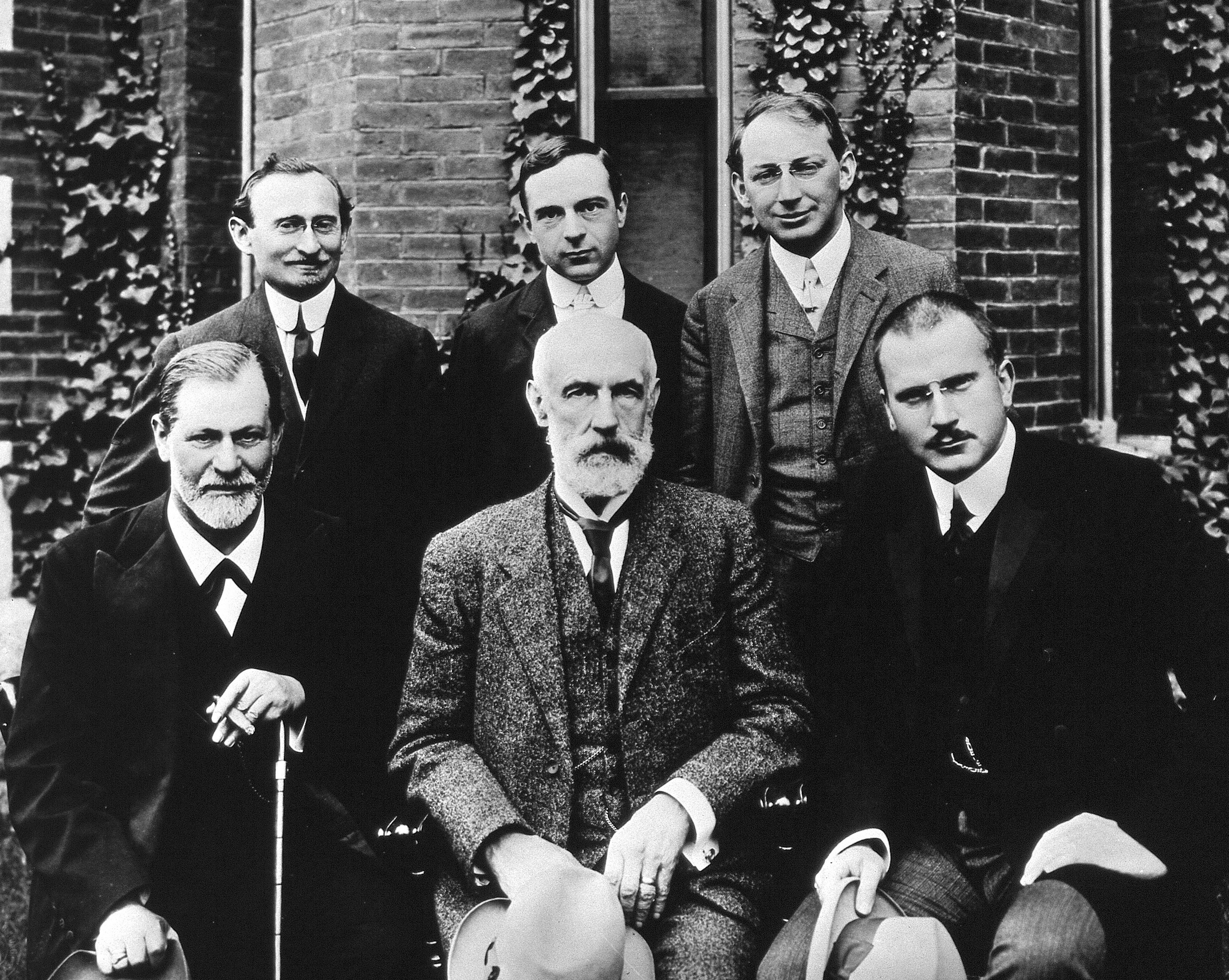
Group photo 1909 in front of Clark University. Front row: Sigmund Freud, G. Stanley Hall, Carl Jung; back row: Abraham A. Brill, Ernest Jones, Sándor Ferenczi

With his career prospects in Britain in serious difficulty, Jones sought refuge in Canada in 1908. He took up teaching duties in the Department of Psychiatry of the University of Toronto (from 1911, as Associate Professor of Psychiatry). In addition to building a private psychoanalytic practice, he worked as pathologist to the Toronto Asylum and Director of its psychiatric outpatient clinic. Following further meetings with Freud in 1909 at Clark University in Worcester, Massachusetts, where Freud gave a series of lectures on psychoanalysis, and in the Netherlands the following year, Jones set about forging strong working relationships with the nascent American psychoanalytic movement. He gave some 20 papers or addresses to American professional societies at venues ranging from Boston, to Washington and Chicago. In 1910 he co-founded the American Psychopathological Association and the following year the American Psychoanalytic Association, serving as its first Secretary until 1913.

Jones undertook an intensive programme of writing and research, which produced the first of what were to be many significant contributions to psychoanalytic literature, notably monographs on Hamlet and On the Nightmare. A number of these were published in German in the main psychoanalytic periodicals published in Vienna; these secured his status in Freud's inner circle during the period of the latter's increasing estrangement from Jung. In this context in 1912 Jones initiated, with Freud's agreement, the formation of a Committee of loyalists charged with safeguarding the theoretical and institutional legacy of the psychoanalytic movement. (Note: Apart from Freud and Jones, the 1912 Committee comprised Otto Rank and Hans Sachs (from Vienna), Karl Abraham (Berlin) and Sándor Ferenczi (Budapest). Later recruits were Max Eitingon (Berlin) and Anna Freud. The Committee continued to function until 1927.) This development also served the more immediate purpose of isolating Jung and, with Jones in strategic control, eventually manoeuvring him out of the Presidency of the International Psychoanalytical Association, a post he had held since its inception. When Jung's resignation came in 1914, it was only the outbreak of the Great War that prevented Jones from taking his place.

Returning to London in 1913, Jones set up in practice as a psychoanalyst, founded the London Psychoanalytic Society, and continued to write and lecture on psychoanalytic theory. A collection of his papers was published as Papers on Psychoanalysis, the first account of psychoanalytic theory and practice by a practising analyst in the English language.

By 1919, the year he founded the British Psychoanalytical Society, Jones could report proudly to Freud that psychoanalysis in Britain "stands in the forefront of medical, literary and psychological interest" (letter 27 January 1919 (Paskauskas 1993)). As President of the Society – a post he would hold until 1944 – Jones secured funding for and supervised the establishment in London of a Clinic offering subsidised fees, and an Institute of Psychoanalysis, which provided administrative, publishing and training facilities for the growing network of professional psychoanalysts.

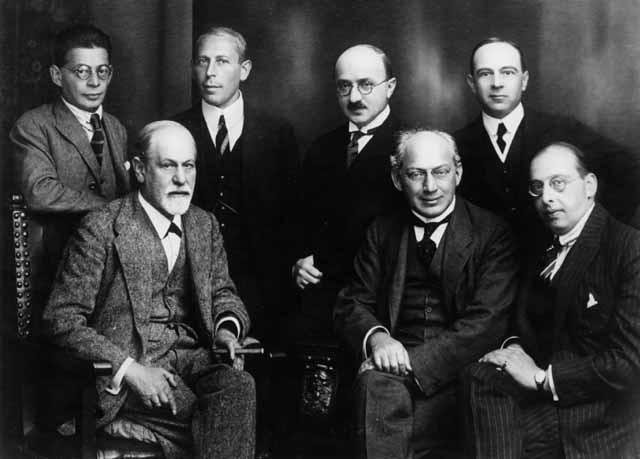
The "Committee", 1922. Left to right, seated: Sigmund Freud, Sándor Ferenczi, and Hanns Sachs. Standing; Otto Rank, Karl Abraham, Max Eitingon, and Ernest Jones.

Jones went on to serve two periods as President of the International Psychoanalytic Association from 1920 to 1924 and 1932 to 1949, where he had significant influence. In 1920 he founded the International Journal of Psychoanalysis, serving as its editor until 1939. The following year he established the International Psychoanalytic Library, which published some 50 books under his editorship. Jones soon obtained from Freud rights to the English translation of his work. In 1924 the first two volumes of Freud's Collected Papers was published in translations edited by Jones and supervised by Joan Riviere, his former analysand and, at one stage, ardent suitor. After a period in analysis with Freud, Riviere worked with Jones as the translation editor of the International Journal of Psychoanalysis. She then was part of a working group Jones set up to plan and deliver James Strachey's translations for the standard edition of Freud's work. Largely through Jones' energetic advocacy, the British Medical Association officially recognised psychoanalysis in 1929. The BBC subsequently removed him from a list of speakers declared to be dangerous to public morality. In the 1930s Jones and his colleagues made a series of radio broadcasts on psychoanalysis.

After Adolf Hitler took power in Germany, Jones helped many displaced and endangered Jewish analysts to resettle in England and other countries. Following the Anschluss of March 1938, Jones flew into Vienna at considerable personal risk to play a crucial role in negotiating and organising the emigration of Freud and his circle to London. (Note: In securing the requisite immigration permits, Jones made use of his personal relationship with the Home Secretary, Sir Samuel Hoare. Both were keen ice skaters and members of the same London skating club.)

== Jones–Freud controversy ==
Jones's early published work on psychoanalysis had been devoted to expositions of the fundamentals of Freudian theory, an elaboration of its theory of symbolism, and its application to the analysis of religion, mythology, folklore and literary and artistic works. Under the influence of Melanie Klein, Jones' work took a new direction.

Klein had made an impact in Berlin in the new field of child analysis and had impressed Jones in 1925 when he attended her series of lectures to the British Society in London. At Jones's invitation she moved to London the following year; she soon acquired a number of devoted and influential followers. Her work had a dramatic effect on the British Society, polarising its members into rival factions as it became clear that her approach to child analysis was seriously at odds with that of Anna Freud, as set out in her 1927 book An Introduction to the Technique of Child Analysis. The disagreement centred around the clinical approach to the pre-Oedipal child; Klein argued for play as an equivalent to free association in adult analyses. Anna Freud opposed any such equivalence, proposing an educative intervention with the child until an appropriate level of ego development was reached at the Oedipal stage. Klein held this to be a collusive inhibition of analytical work with the child.

Influenced by Klein, and initiating what became known as the Jones–Freud controversy, Jones set out to explore a range of interlinked topics in the theory of early psychic development. These included the structure and genesis of the superego and the nature of the feminine castration complex. He coined the term phallocentrism in a critique of Freud's account of sexual difference. He argued together with Klein and her Berlin colleague, Karen Horney, for a primary femininity, saying that penis envy arose as a defensive formation rather than arising from the fact, or "injury", of biological asymmetry. In a corresponding reformulation of the castration complex, Jones introduced the concept of "aphanisis" to refer to the fear of "the permanent extinction of the capacity (including opportunity) for sexual enjoyment".

These departures from orthodoxy were noted in Vienna and were topics that were featured in the regular Freud–Jones correspondence, the tone of which became increasingly fractious. Faced with accusations from Freud of orchestrating a campaign against him and his daughter, Jones sought to allay Freud's concerns without abandoning his new critical standpoint. Eventually, following a series of exchange lectures between the Vienna and London societies, which Jones arranged with Anna Freud, Freud and Jones resumed their usual cordial exchanges.

With the arrival in Britain of refugee German and Viennese analysts in the 1930s, including Anna Freud in 1938, the hostility between the orthodox Freudians and Kleinians in the British Society grew more intense. Jones chaired a number of "extraordinary business meetings" with the aim of defusing the conflict, and these continued into the war years. The meetings, which became known as the controversial discussions, were established on a more regular basis from 1942. By that time, Jones had removed himself from direct participation, owing to ill health and the difficulties of war-time travel from his home in Elsted, West Sussex. He resigned from the presidency of the British Society in 1944, the year in which, under the presidency of Sylvia Payne, there finally emerged a compromise agreement which established parallel training courses providing options to satisfy the concerns of the rival groups that had formed: followers of Anna Freud, followers of Melanie Klein and a non-aligned group of Middle or Independent Group analysts. It was agreed further that all the key policy making committees of the BPS should have representatives from the three groups.

== Later life and death ==
After the end of the war, Jones gradually relinquished his many official posts whilst continuing his psychoanalytic practice, writings and lecturing. The major undertaking of his final years was his monumental account of Freud's life and work, published to widespread acclaim in three volumes between 1953 and 1957. In this he was ably assisted by his German-speaking wife, who translated much of Freud's early correspondence and other archive documentation made available by Anna Freud. His uncompleted autobiography, Free Associations, was published posthumously in 1959.

Always proud of his Welsh origins, Jones became a member of the Welsh Nationalist Party, Plaid Cymru. He had a particular love of the Gower Peninsula, which he had explored extensively in his youth. Following the purchase of a holiday cottage in Llanmadoc, this area became a regular holiday retreat for the Jones family. He was instrumental in helping secure its status in 1956, as the first region of the UK to be designated an Area of Outstanding Natural Beauty.

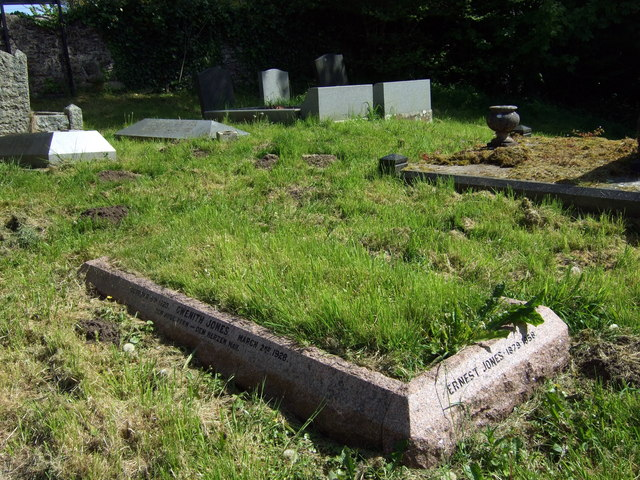
Jones’ grave in the churchyard of St Cadoc's Cheriton on the Gower Peninsula

Both of Jones's main leisure pursuits resulted in significant publications. A keen ice skater since his schooldays, Jones published an influential textbook on the subject. His passion for chess inspired a psychoanalytical study of the life of American chess genius, Paul Morphy.

Jones was made a Fellow of the Royal College of Physicians (FRCP) in 1942, Honorary President of the International Psychoanalytical Association in 1949, and was awarded an Honorary Doctor of Science degree at Swansea University (Wales) in 1954.

Jones died in London on 11 February 1958, and was cremated at Golders Green Crematorium. His ashes were buried in the grave of the oldest of his four children in the churchyard of St Cadoc's Cheriton on the Gower Peninsula.

== Works ==
Maddox (2006) includes a comprehensive bibliography of Jones' writings.

- 1912. Papers on Psycho-Analysis. London: Balliere Tindall & Cox. Revised and enlarged editions, 1918, 1923, 1938, 1948 (5th edition).
- 1920. Treatment of the Neuroses. London: Balliere Tindall & Cox
- 1921. Psycho-Analysis and the War Neuroses. With Karl Abraham, Sándor Ferenczi and Ernst Simmel. London: International Psycho-Analytical Press
- 1923. Essays in Applied Psycho-Analysis. London: International Psycho-Analytical Press. Revised and enlarged edition, 1951, London: Hogarth Press. Reprinted (1974) as Psycho-Myth, Psycho-History. 2 vols. New York: Hillstone.
- 1924 (editor). Social Aspects of Psycho-Analysis: Lectures Delivered under the Auspices of the Sociological Society. London: Williams and Norgate.
- 1928. Psycho-Analysis. London: E. Benn. Reprinted (1949) with an Addendum as What is Psychoanalysis ?. London: Allen & Unwin
- 1931a. On the Nightmare. London: Hogarth Press and Institute of Psycho-Analysis.
- 1931b. The Elements of Figure Skating. London: Methuen. Revised and enlarged edition, 1952. London: Allen and Unwin.
- 1949. Hamlet and Oedipus. London: V. Gollancz.
- 1953. Sigmund Freud: Life and Work. Vol 1: The Young Freud 1856–1900. London: Hogarth Press.
- 1955. Sigmund Freud: Life and Work. Vol 2: The Years of Maturity 1901–1919. London: Hogarth Press.
- 1957. Sigmund Freud: Life and Work. Vol 3: The Last Phase 1919–1939. London: Hogarth Press.
- 1961. Sigmund Freud: Life and Work. An abridgment of the preceding 3 volume work, by Lionel Trilling and Stephen Marcus, with Introduction by Lionel Trilling. New York: Basic Books.
- 1956. Sigmund Freud: Four Centenary Addresses. New York: Basic Books
- 1959. Free Associations: Memories of a Psycho-Analyst. Epilogue by Mervyn Jones. London: Hogarth Press. Reprinted (1990) with a New Introduction by Mervyn Jones. New Brunswick and London: Transaction Publishers.

== Correspondence ==
- Paskauskas, R Andrew (ed), The Complete Correspondence of Sigmund Freud and Ernest Jones, 1908–1939., Belknap Press, Harvard University Press, 1995, ISBN 978-0-674-15424-7
- Sándor Ferenczi – Ernest Jones: Letters 1911–1933. London: Karnac Books, 2013. ISBN 978-1-7804917-6-9

== See also ==
- The Life and Work of Sigmund Freud

== Notes ==
Professional and academic associations
New office	President of the British Psychoanalytical Society; 1919–1944	Succeeded by Sylvia Payne
Preceded by Sándor Ferenczi	President of the International Psychoanalytical Association; 1920–1924	Succeeded by Karl Abraham
Preceded by Max Eitingon	President of the International Psychoanalytical Association; 1932–1949	Succeeded by Leo H. Bartemeier
