= Basic fault theory =

Theory in Human Psychology

Basic Fault Theory was proposed by Michael Balint, and alludes to an individual's inability to form healthy relationships due to unresolved dependency issues from early childhood in relation to the formation of object reactions in an effort to deal with a lack of adjustment between their psychological needs and the lack or negative care provided by someone close to them.

A crucial aspect of the theory is the relationship between the doctor and patient. As this is where the doctor could either make the issue of their basic fault worse, or help the individual get rid of it. Balint suggests that the doctor needs to perform “psychological mothering”, and act almost to re-establish a care relationship for the patient since that is what they most likely were lacking from childhood.

== Background ==
Michael Balint was a practising psychoanalyst, who was an advocate of the object relations theory. Balint was operating during the time of much growth and development in the 1950s for psychoanalysts – his peers were describing concepts such as ‘object relations’, Kleinian psychoanalysis and ‘attachment theory’.

Balint was a student of Sandor Ferenczi, who was one of the first professors of psychoanalysis in 1919. It was with Ferenczi that Balint underwent training in psychoanalysis. Additionally, when Balint was still a young student, his interest in psychoanalysis was furthered by his introduction to Sigmund Freud's work by Alice Szekely-Kovacs. This interest in psychoanalysis caused Balint to analyse the importance of doctor-patient relationships when seeking treatment. Balint published an article in 1923 about the benefits of General Practitioners using psychoanalysis. Balint also received a doctorate in medical sciences for his dissertation, Individual Differences of Behaviour in Early Infancy. Which led Balint to create his theory of object-relations.

The program Balint proposed that General Practitioners should follow is that a person's psyche is best discovered when communicating directly with the person concerned. These potential mental health issues needed to be explored with the cooperation of patient and physician. He also argued that if health care professionals felt that only they, as doctors, were knowledgeable and superior enough than the public to help the sick, the relationship would not be as effective. As Balint argued this would hinder communication channels in treatment. Balint stressed the importance of a healthy, unbiased, friendly relationship between doctor and patient, not unnecessarily applying barriers like status or occupation. Balint strongly believed that the most important aspect of therapy was the patient to analyst relationship. Analysts needed to be highly attuned to reading the subtleties and/or nonverbal cues of their patients in order to evolve their relationship, to uncover what is ‘hurting’ them, or causing a 'fault'.

== Basic Fault Theoretical model ==
=== Theory ===
Basic Fault is a theory created by Michael Balint, which suggests that every human's basic fault is caused in one's childhood. Specifically, a negative event or trauma that occurs in one's childhood between them and an adult, causing a fixation on objects, intense and often overwhelming emotions and the incapacity to deal with stress. This work is related to psychoanalytic theory and caused the beginning of a reformation in this line of theory.

The human mind is made up of biological drives and conflicts and is extremely dynamic. Balint described that the fault humans potentially encounter in development, is neither instinct nor does it originate from a conflict. The fault lies within the mind, and in order to regain balance, needs to be fixed. The fault causing the issue could be resulting from something missing for most of their life. The basic fault developed needs to be healed and is said to be done so by providing the patient with what they are lacking. Balint suggested that for some patients, it may never fully heal, but shall remain a faint, painless scar. The basic fault is also not exclusively located in the mind but can be connected to the whole psychobiological structure of patient. Which can allude to other more common mental health issues, such as character disorders or psychosomatic illnesses. Similarly, Balint outlined that the basic fault was created due to a discrepancy in the patient's early childhood years and was an issue between the individual's biopsychological needs and the care, attention and affection made available to them during these years. The lack of adequate care can lead to deficiencies, thus a basic fault in the individual.

Balint describes that at a basic-fault level, the relationships children are exposed to are exclusively a two-person style – whether these were positive or negative relationships and were extremely important. The nature of this relationship was described as crucial, in relation to the primary object relationship or of primary love, the introduction of a third party can potentially interfere and be viewed by the infant as an unnecessary strain. There is also a distinction between the level of satisfaction and frustration with the primary care-giver. Satisfaction relating to the 'fitting in' of the object with the person, and when successful can produce feelings of tranquility. On the opposite end of the spectrum, there is potential for frustration. Which is the ill-fitting in of the object in relation to the individual, and this can produce very intense and prominent symptoms.

Balint expanded on these concepts in some of his later work; ‘Friendly expanses – horrid empty spaces’. It was here that he devised the concept of two basic defensive mechanisms that are developed, coining the terms ‘ocnophilia’ and ‘philobatism’. The ocnophilic mode is when infants begin to cling to objects (like caregivers) in an effort to avoid empty space. The philobat is a space that feels safe, however the objects can be dangerous.

Balint's views on what causes people to become profoundly disturbed differed from psychoanalysts of the time, as he proposed it was due to a deficit more so than a conflict during developmental stages. It was an ill-fitting relationship between the caregiver and infant, not just a conflict that may have occurred. Arguing that caregivers who provides care that is ‘insufficient, deficient, haphazard, over-anxious, over-protective, harsh, rigid, grossly inconsistent, incorrectly timed, over-stimulating or merely un-understanding or indifferent’ is not good for the infant's development.

=== Application ===
Balint argued that some more ‘rigid’ techniques used by other psychoanalysts at the time were never going to be successful in helping all types of patients, as they relied too much on the interpretation of their life events. While he argued these were useful for patients suffering the effects of conflicts from the Oedipal period of development; more challenging patients (now considered as those with personality disorders), Balint argued were suffering from the fundamental disorder of the basic fault and needed to be treated with more care and less interpretation.

Much of Balint's theories were developed through his experiences with patients he was treating. He observed many of his patients using the word ‘fault’, when describing they felt there was something wrong with them. This spurred Balint to use a geological metaphor to describe faults, suggesting that ‘in geology the word fault is used to describe a sudden irregularity which in normal circumstances might lie hidden but, if strains and stresses occur, may lead to a break, profoundly disrupting the overall structure’.

Balint found that these faults were created during early development stages, such as pre-Oedipal and pre-verbal, and were most successfully reached in regressed states. Balint described regressed states as forms of benign and malignant. Benign regression is described as patients becoming trusting, similar to the way a child does, which fosters creativity and new beginnings. Whereas in malignant regression, patients became increasingly more demanding, using the analyst's attention to them for gratification purposes, instead of opportunities for growth and self-discovery. A crucial aspect in the regression part of therapy was ensuring that the analyst did not interpret too much, as was typical of the Kleinian method, as Balint argued this only made patients feel small, which in turn stimulated the oncophilia (clinginess) and/or malignant regression.

In order to get out of the ‘basic fault zone’, the patient needs to undergo a type of “psychological mothering”, with the help of the doctor. The avoidance of the patient's traumatic situation is also vital. The regression into their past, can be therapeutic if the goal or outcome is recognising the previously avoided need, instead of satisfying it through substitution. Therefore, to re-establish a primary love or care relationship and uncover the basic fault of the past trauma, helps initiate the basic fault to be healed. Balint suggested that a patient is rid of their faults when they are able to no longer compulsively cling to object relations.

Balint also suggested that patients are capable of understanding some ‘tactics’ used by the analyst. The patient potentially possesses the ability to interpret the analyst's behaviour, which Balint describes can be perceived as telepathy or clairvoyance. If the analyst is unable to recognise this, or in other words, respond in with no reaction of anger, or criticism will occur as is expected at the Oedipal level. Instead, it is expected to feel empty or lost. Furthermore, the failing to recognise the patient's abilities, Balint also suggests can appear as persecutory anxieties. Resulting in patients potentially feeling that anything positive could exist, and that their frustrations are caused by anything other than evil intentions, malice or some form of criminal behaviour. While patients could recognise that good things can happen, they believe it to be only by chance, and their constant frustrations are proof of hostility in their environment. Balint described that a patient suffering from the Basic Fault, is experiencing a mixture of suffering, are inclined to behave pugnaciously, while still trying to get on with their life.

== Criticisms ==
Some argue that Balint's proposal about regression needs revision, and that it is not impossible to argue that deficit and conflictual models are competitors. Balint often emphasised that his theory of basic fault was non-conflictual, compared to others like the Kleinians. However, the very nature of basic fault suggests otherwise, as the individuals desire is associated with powerful anxieties they create and that they cannot deal with, which is inherently conflictual. As patients demonstrated a battle between wanting to have their desire met but fearing what would happen by doing so.

Additionally, with the Balint therapist method, the analyst shall be repeatedly ‘tested’ by the patient, as a basic fault refers to failure in all patients’ relational strategies, meaning they need to prove their trustworthiness in order to deserve the patients trust. Which is not necessarily a good thing, as the therapist should not need to demonstrate their trustworthiness repeatedly, some argue it should be demonstrated through their willingness to listen, and as it is their job to do so. Therefore, suggesting that a therapist-patient relationship is not the same as patients' relationships in their real-world, and needs to be treated differently.

== See also ==
- Balint Society
- Psychoanalytic theory
