= Douglas Haldane =

Scottish child psychiatrist

J. Douglas Haldane
- Born: 13 March 1926; Annan, Dumfriesshire, Scotland
- Died: 19 July 2012 (aged 86); St. Andrews, Scotland
- Citizenship: British
- Education: Edinburgh University
- Known for: Child and Family Psychiatry; Family Therapy; Scottish Institute of Human Relations; Marriage Counselling Scotland
- Scientific career
- Fields: Child psychiatry Family Therapy; Marriage counselling Depth psychology Spirituality
- Workplaces: Royal Edinburgh Hospital; Stratheden Hospital; University of Aberdeen; Tavistock Institute of Marital Studies

(Johnston) Douglas Haldane MBE, FRCPsych (born 13 March 1926 in Annan, died 19 July 2012 in St. Andrews) was a pioneering Scottish child psychiatrist, who established Great Britain's first department of Child and Family Psychiatry in 1960 in Cupar in Fife. He opened the first family in-patient treatment unit in Scotland and introduced a range of innovative therapeutic art interventions. He sat on numerous policy working parties and led a variety of professional committees. He became a founding member of the Association for Family Therapy. He was a co-founder of the Scottish Institute of Human Relations. During his time as an academic, he devoted much time to influence the development of a government policy on Marriage. In the 1960s, he was also an elder of the Church of Scotland and a member of an early Iona Community group.

== Early life ==
Douglas Haldane was born Johnston Douglas Leitch, in Annan, Dumfriesshire. Johnston was the family name of one of his grandmothers. His single mother married when he was around 5 years old, and he then took his stepfather's surname. He was a good scholar and attended academies in Dumbarton (where he was evacuated during the early war years) and Dumfries. He entered Edinburgh University to study medicine in 1943, graduating MB ChB in 1948. He was very happy to be one of the first doctors qualifying into the newly formed National Health Service. After a tour as an obstetric house surgeon at Cresswell Maternity Hospital, Dumfries and in Edinburgh, he spent his National Service as a surgeon lieutenant in the RNVR in Great Yarmouth. On completing his service, he married his wife, Kathleen. They had three sons.

== Career ==
In the early 1950s he was promoted to registrar at the Royal Edinburgh Hospital and became lecturer at the Royal College of Nursing. At the end of the decade he was appointed at a relatively young age, consultant psychiatrist and depute physician superintendent at Stratheden Hospital, Cupar in Fife. The hospital had been an old-style asylum, but he pursued his vision of creating a department of Child and Family Psychiatry which he succeeded in doing in 1960 in a designated unit called, 'Playfield House' in the hospital grounds. This became a base for out-reach child and family services in Glenrothes and Kirkcaldy and other areas in the Kingdom of Fife. He believed in involving children's domestic and educational settings and persuaded colleagues from other disciplines to explore new avenues of treatment. One of his notable recruits was the artist, Joyce Laing, who was instrumental in the rehabilitation of a convicted 'lifer' at Barlinnie prison, Jimmy Boyle. Haldane managed to persuade Fife Health Board to build two family residential units in the grounds of Stratheden which he achieved by 1975. In that period, Haldane had been appointed honorary lecturer in psychiatry at the University Edinburgh. In 1976 Haldane took up an academic appointment as senior lecturer at the University of Aberdeen, which afforded more time for writing and committee work. He became honorary consultant to Grampian Health Board. Douglas Haldane formally retired from his university post in 1982 (when the university was making cutbacks), but continued for a further decade with his many other engagements from his home in St. Andrews, which included acting as consultant to the Camphill Movement in Scotland. He was briefly a director of the Garnethill Centre in Glasgow. His sculptor wife pre-deceased him in 2011, having succumbed to dementia. Haldane died shortly and unexpectedly after moving into a residential home, at the age of 86.

=== Activist and 'organisational genius' ===
Haldane understood early on that in the welfare state and under the new National Health Service, child health, youth justice and clinical services were designed away from the clinic or hospital. Accordingly, he devoted much energy and time to a range of committee roles. These included: the Scottish Education Department's working party on 'maladjusted children', and the Secretary State's advisory Council on Childcare. Later on he chaired the Scottish Marriage Council (1984–86) and in the 1990s was engaged with Marriage Counselling Scotland and was invited to sit on the Tavistock Institute of Marital Studies' advisory panel. His far-sightedness prompted the creation of the Malcolm Millar Lectures at Aberdeen. Did his promotion of Scottish 'thinking space' contribute to the nation's longing for autonomy? His obituary in The Scotsman described him as an organisational genius and generous to his patients and colleagues.

=== Legacy of an instigator ===
His grasp of group dynamics and the application of different professional modalities in the public sector, saw Haldane seek out like-minded social entrepreneurs. In that context he is regarded as having been instrumental in persuading J. D. Sutherland to return to his native Scotland, on retiring as medical director of London's Tavistock Clinic in 1968. Together, with several other leading figures, they succeeded in laying the foundations of the Scottish Institute of Human Relations, which was intended as an early form of Think tank and provider of awareness and training for professionals involved in the public and corporate sectors. Meanwhile, Haldane served as honorary president of the Association of Psychiatric Social Workers' Scottish branch, was chairman of Fife's Children's Panel Advisory Council, of the child psychiatry section of the Royal Medico Psychological Association's Scottish executive, vice-president of the Scottish Pre-School Playgroups Association and helped to introduce the idea of play in the hospital setting, which today is commonplace on paediatric wards. With his clinical and policy experience, Haldane was active in the formation of the (British) Association of Family Therapy.

=== Publications ===
In-line with his many professional commitments, Haldane was a prolific author who wrote and co-authored numerous papers and books. These include:

- 'New psychiatric inpatient unit for adolescents' British Medical Journal (1968) iii: 243–5, with McInnes, D.
- Models for Psychotherapy: A Primer. with Alexander, D. A. and Walker, L. G. Publisher: Aberdeen University Press. 1982 ISBN 978-00802-844-60
- Wedlocked?: Intervention and Research in Marriage. David Clark; Douglas Haldane. Polity Press, 1990. ISBN 074-56031-14
- Marriage Now: Asking Questions. Douglas Haldane, (editor with Frances Love). Published by: Marriage Counselling Scotland, Edinburgh, Scotland, 1996,
- A celebration of Marriage? : Scotland, 1931–1981 : implications for marital counselling and therapy Aberdeen University Press 1982.
- Also see Synopsis of all publications since 1980 by Tavistock Relationships.

== Honours and awards ==
In 1994 Douglas Haldane was elected an honorary member of the Society of Psychoanalytical Marital Psychotherapists. In 1995 he was invested as a Member of the Most Excellent Order of the British Empire (MBE) for services to marriage counselling and for family services in Fife.
