= Olga Dormandi =

Hungarian painter and children's book illustrator

- Born: Olga Szélesky-Kovács; 19 February 1900; Szeged, Hungary
- Died: 29 December 1971 (aged 71)
- Spouse: Ladislas Dormandi (m. 1924–1967; his death)
- Children: Judith Dupont (1925–2025)
- Father: Lajos Székely

Olga Dormandi (née Szélesky-Kovács; 19 February 1900 – 29 December 1971) was a Hungarian painter and children’s book illustrator. During her career that spanned six decades, Dormandi created portraits, landscapes, and still lives, and worked with watercolor, oil paint, pastels, stone lithographs, sculpting, pen and ink, screenprint, Chinese ink, and ceramic.

== Life in Hungary ==
Dormandi was born in Szeged, Hungary to Lajos and Vilma Székely. Her parents divorced in 1904 and she and her siblings were adopted by their mother’s second husband, Frigyes Kovács. In 1924 she married her husband Ladislas Dormandi, a Hungarian writer and editor. A year later she gave birth to her only child Judith (born 1925).

Olga Dormandi began drawing and painting as a young child. She studied at the Mme Ernestine Lovagh's School and later was tutored by Róbert Berény, a Hungarian poster artist. Her first exhibition was in 1922, at the Ernst Museum in Budapest.

Many of Dormandi's family members were psychoanalysts, including her mother Vilma, sister Alice, daughter Judith, and her brother-in-law Michael Balint and his second wife Enid Balint. She often created paintings and caricatures of these family members as well as their colleagues, sometimes even traveling to international psychoanalysis conferences in Salzburg and Vienna for this purpose. As a result, Olga left behind a collection of portraits of prominent psychoanalysts from the 20th century.

== Emigration to Paris ==
In 1938, Austria was annexed by Germany in an event called the Anchluss, indicating that the Nazis were moving towards Hungary as well. Dormandi and her family were of Jewish descent, and so that year she moved out of Hungary with her husband, daughter, sister, brother-in-law Michael, and their son John. The family stayed together in Paris until the German occupation of France. The Balints moved to England, while the Dormandis remained in France under much secrecy.

== Work in Paris ==
At the end of the Second World War and the German occupation, Dormandi came out of hiding and was able to resume her artistic career in Paris. She illustrated a luxury edition of Silence of the Sea (Le Silence de la Mer) by Vercors (the original edition without her illustrations was published during the German Occupation of Paris). She exhibited at French galleries, such as the Galerie du Pont des Arts and the Gallerie Berheim Jeune, becoming well known for her many paintings of Pont Neuf. In the 1950s, Dormandi’s painting Young Girls from Hammameth was purchased by the Louvre.

Dormandi lived in Paris for the remainder of her life, although starting in 1956 she made biannual visits to the United States and often traveled around Europe to make portraits. Olga Dormandi died in 1971. She had two exhibits of her work after her death, one in 1973 in New York and one in 2005 in Paris.
