= Dormandi =

Dormandi is a surname. Notable people with the surname include:

- Ladislas Dormandi (1898–1967), Hungarian-born French publisher, translator and novelist
- Olga Dormandi (1900–1971), Hungarian painter and children's book illustrator
