= Ladislas Dormandi =

Hungarian-born French writer (1898–1967)

Ladislas Dormandi (also known as László Dormándi; 1898–1967) was a Hungarian-born French publisher, translator and novelist who wrote in Hungarian and French.

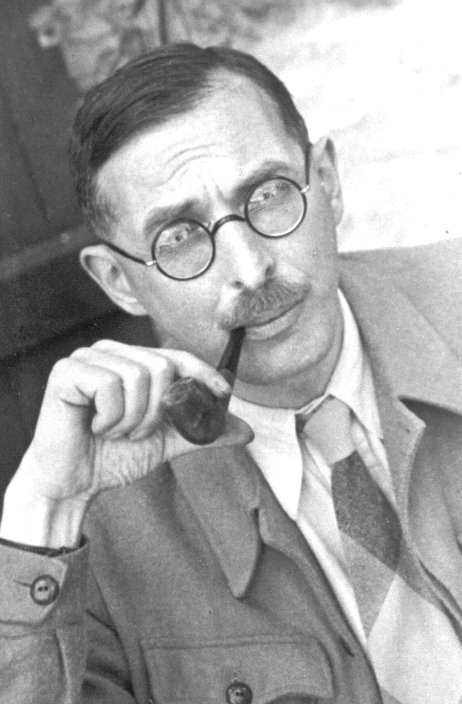

== Biography ==
Dormandi was born on 14 July 1898 in Dormánd, a village of the Austro-Hungarian Empire located since 1918 in Hungary. In 1924, he married the artist Olga Székely-Kovács (1900-1971) whose sister Alice Székely-Kovács (1898-1939) was a psychoanalyst and the first wife of Michael Balint. Dormandi's first novels were published in Hungary under the name László Dormándi. Between the two World Wars, he was also active as a translator and publisher, of for example Thomas Mann and Stefan Zweig.

In 1938, the Dormandis fled Hungary and settled in Paris. During World War II, Dormandi worked for the clandestine publishing house Les Éditions de Minuit. After the war, he became a successful writer in French under the name Ladislas Dormandi. He was awarded the Cazes Prize in 1953 for his novel Pas si fou.

He acquired French nationality by naturalization on 8 April 1948 and died in Paris on 26 November 1967. Dormandi's and Olga Székely-Kovács' daughter Judith Dupont (1925–2025) was a well-known French psychoanalyst.

== Bibliography ==
In Hungarian

- Vihar (1920)
- A tűzsárkány (1921)
- Sólyommadár (1927)
- A jó ember (1930)
- Két jelentéktelen ember (1937, translated in French as Deux hommes sans importance)
- A bajthozó tündér (1941, translated in French as La Fée maléfique)
- Trópusi láz (1941, translated in French as Fièvre tropicale)
- Zárás után (1942)
- A félelem (1946)
- A mű (1948)
- A hórihorgas és a köpcös (1965)
- A múlt zarándoka (1968)
- Bábszínház (1968)

In French

- La vie des autres (1944, translated in Spanish by Julio Cortázar as La vida de los otros)
- La péniche sans nom (1951)
- Pas si fou (1952)
- La Traque (1955)
- Le fantôme de la rue Babel (1956)
- Tu mourras seul (1957)
- L'ombre du capitaine (1958)
- Plus heureux que l'enfance (1960)
- Le naufragé de la terre ferme (1961)
- Le compagnon de voyage (1962)
