= Julio Moizeszowicz =

Argentine psychiatrist (born 1943)

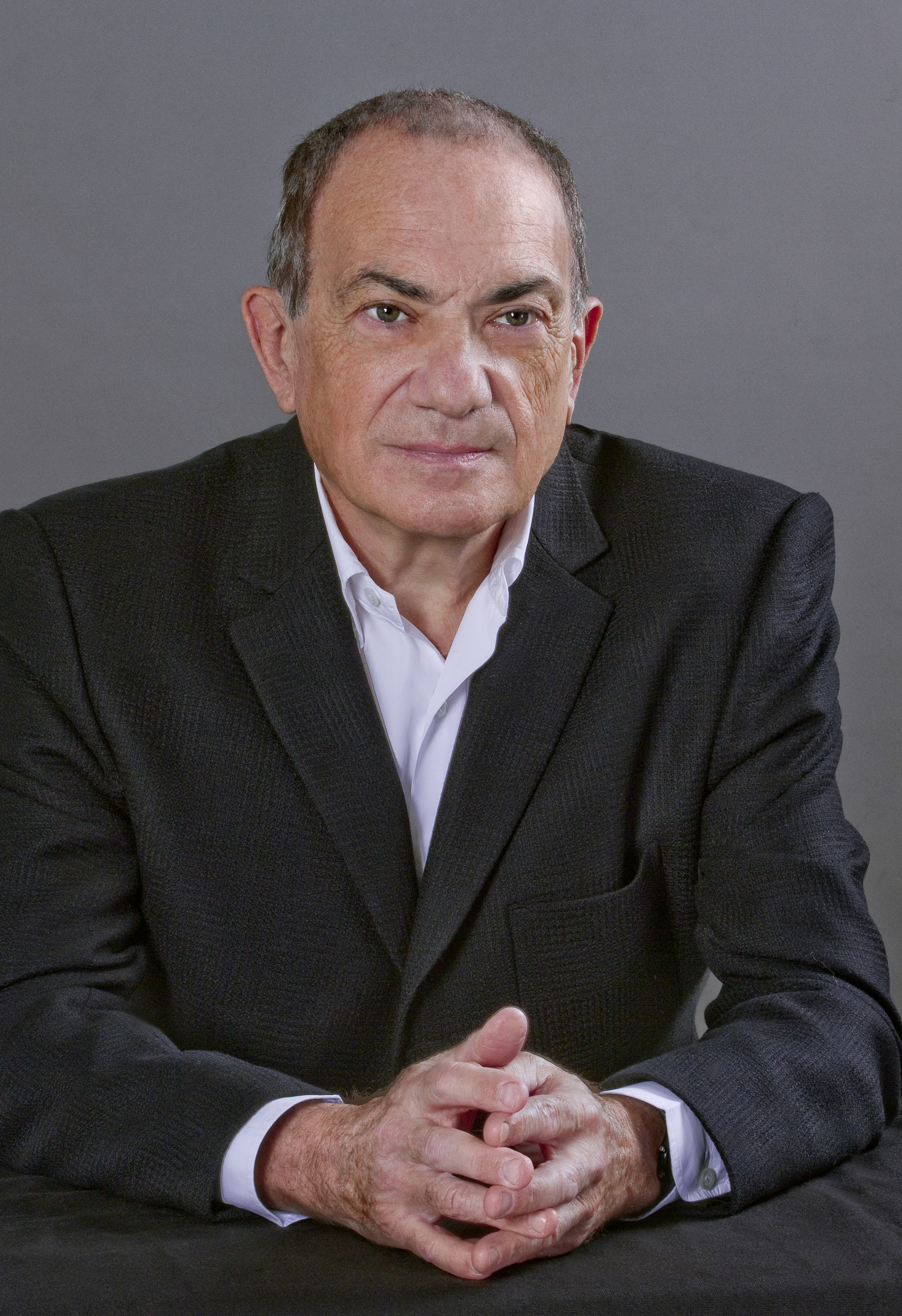
- Born: 25 May 1943; Buenos Aires
- Known for: Development of evidence-based treatments of mental disorders with psychoactive drugs.
- Scientific career
- Fields: Psychiatry, Psychotherapy, Neuroscience
- Workplaces: Profesor de la Facultad de Medicina de Universidad de Buenos Aires

Julio Moizeszowicz is an Argentine psychiatrist. He was born May 25, 1943 in Buenos Aires, Argentina. He is the son of Polish immigrants who moved to Argentina before World War II.

Moizeszowicz's research aims to treat mental disorders such as psychosis, neurosis and depression by rebalancing the relationship between the body and mind through psychotherapy, psychoanalysis and treatment with psychoactive drugs. He uses drugs to address imbalances of neurotransmitters in the brain, preventing the formation or reinforcement of traumatic memories via neuronal plasticity after psychological trauma.

== Career ==
Moizeszowicz was a Resident Physician at the University of Buenos Aires Medical Clinic Research Institute from 1965 to 1968. He worked with the team that performed the first kidney transplants. He was also involved in the first Balint Society group for psychotherapists in Argentina.

In 1968, after completing his residency, he went to Germany to work on clinical drug development. He contributed to Phase I/II studies of a variety of drugs (such as the psychotropic agents nomifensine, etifoxine, clobazam and loprazolam, and the biologic drugs streptokinase and haemaccel) at the Pharmacologic and Medical Department of Hoechst AG, Behringwerke in Germany.

In 1973, he joined the National Neuropsychiatric Hospital José Tiburcio Borda in Buenos Aires. He obtained a specialty degree and certification as a psychiatrist. His thesis was entitled "Current status of the clinical evaluation of psychotropic drugs".

In 1983, as the result of an open scientific competition, he was appointed as an associate professor in the Mental Health Department at Buenos Aires Medical School. The jury included Horacio Etchegoyen, Mauricio Goldenberg and Dionisio Duarte. He held this position until 1994, teaching the application of evidence-based medicine to the neuro-psychopharmacological and psychotherapeutic treatments of patients in the general hospital. From 1983 to 1989, he ran the seminars in psychoanalysis at the Psychoanalytic Association of Buenos Aires (ApdeBA, affiliated with the International Psychoanalytic Association).

Other significant positions include professor of psychopathology at the Buenos Aires Psychoanalytic Association; professor of psychopharmacology at the Argentine Psychiatrist Association; and supervisor at the Psychopharmacology Section of the Psychology Department in the Israeli Hospital, Buenos Aires (1977–1989).

=== Visiting positions ===
- 1985–1986: Professor at Salta Health Sciences School, National University of Salta
- 1997: Visiting Professor at the School of Medicine, National University of Córdoba
- 2001: Visiting Professor at the Galician School of Health Administration, Santiago de Compostela, Spain

=== Society Memberships ===
- Argentine Medical Association
- Argentine Psychiatric Association
- Argentine College of Psychopharmacology and Neuroscience (board member)
- American Psychiatric Association (International member)
- New York Academy of Sciences (International member)

=== Community service ===
He has served as President of the Psychopharmacology Section of the Argentine Psychiatrist Association (affiliated with the World Psychiatric Association, 1983–1993) and as a Member of the Buenos Aires Psychoanalytic Association (component society of the International Psychoanalytic Association). He was medical director at "The Aleph" Day Mental Health Clinic (1986–1995); President of the Foundation of Psychopharmacology Research; Editor of the "Revista Argentina de Psicofarmacología" (Argentine Psychopharmacology Journal, 1995–2000) and the "Revista FundoPsi, Evidencia en Psicofarmacología" (Argentine Journal of Evidence-based Psychopharmacology, 2000–2004).

== Publications ==
- "Psicofarmacología Psicodinámica IV. Estrategias terapéuticas y psiconeurobiológicas" (Psychodynamic Psychopharmacology IV. Therapeutic and psycho-neurobiological strategies), Editorial Paidós, Buenos Aires, 1998. (ISBN 950-12-3180-1).
- "Psicofarmacología y Territorio Freudiano. Teoría y clínica de un abordaje interdisciplinario", (Psychopharmacology and Freudian Territory. A Theory and Clinical interdisciplinary approach), en colaboración con Mirta Moizeszowicz, Editorial Paidós, Buenos Aires, 2000. (ISBN 950-12-4229-3).
- "Psicofármacos en Geriatría", (Psychotropic Drugs in Geriatrics), en colaboración con Myriam Monczor, Editorial McGraw- Hill Interamericana, Buenos Aires, 2001 y 2012. (ISBN 958-41-0272-9).
- "Actualizaciones en Psicofarmacología Psicodinámica 2009". (Updates on Psychodynamic Psychopharmacology 2009), Ediciones Roche, Buenos Aires, 2009. (ISBN 978-987-25235-0-3),
- "Actualizaciones en Psicofarmacología Psicodinámica 2008". (Updates on Psychodynamic Psychopharmacology 2008), Ediciones Roche, Buenos Aires, 2008. (ISBN 978-987-05-4742-6).
- "Actualizaciones en Psicofarmacología Psicodinámica 2007". (Updates on Psychodynamic Psychopharmacology 2007), Ediciones Roche, Buenos Aires, 2007. (ISBN 978-987-05-3015-2).
- "Actualizaciones en Psicofarmacología Psicodinámica 2006". (Updates on Psychodynamic Psychopharmacology 2006), Ediciones Roche, Buenos Aires, 2006. (ISBN 978-987-05-1263-9).
- "Actualizaciones en Psicofarmacología Psicodinámica 2005". (Updates on Psychodynamic Psychopharmacology 2005), Ediciones Roche, Buenos Aires, 2005. (ISBN 987-43-9579-6).
- "Actualizaciones en Psicofarmacología Psicodinámica 2004". (Updates on Psychodynamic Psychopharmacology 2004), Ediciones Roche, Buenos Aires, 2004. (ISBN 987-43-8089-6).
- "Actualizaciones en Psicofarmacología Psicodinámica 2003". (Updates on Psychodynamic Psychopharmacology 2003), Ediciones Roche, Buenos Aires, 2003. (ISBN 987-43-6307-X).
- "Actualizaciones en Psicofarmacología Psicodinámica 2002". (Updates on Psychodynamic Psychopharmacology 2002), Ediciones Roche, Buenos Aires, 2002. (ISBN 987-43-4914-X).
- "Urgencias Psiquiátricas", Capítulo en el libro de Emergencias Médicas y Quirúrgicas ("Psychiatric Emergencies", chapter in the book Medical and Surgical Emergencies, Gerardo Bare y otros), en colaboración con Roberto Bronstein, Ediciones Edimed, Buenos Aires, 1994. (ISBN 950-9275-19-0).
- "Psicofarmacología Psicodinámica III. Nuevos enfoques clínico-terapéuticos". (Psychodynamic Psychopharmacology III. New clinical and therapeutical approaches), Editorial Paidós, Buenos Aires, 1994. (ISBN 950-12-3139-9).
- "Psicofarmacología Psicodinámica II. Aspectos neuroquímicos, neuropsiquiátricos y psicológicos" (Psychodynamic Psychopharmacology II. Neurochemical, neuropsychiatric and psychological aspects), Editorial Paidós, Buenos Aires, 1994. (ISBN 950-12-3116-X).
- "Psicofarmacología Psicodinámica I. Aspectos neuroquímicos y psicológicos". (Psychodynamic Psychopharmacology I. Neurochemical and psychological aspects), Editorial Paidós, Buenos Aires, 1982. (ISBN 950-12-3102-X).
- Utilidad de la potenciación con antipsicóticos atípicos, en la depresión resistente. 26° Congreso Argentino de Psiquiatría, Asociación de Psiquiatras Argentinos, Mar del Plata, Hotel Sheraton, 19-22 Abril 2012.
- Viñetas Clínicas Interactivas: Actualidad diagnóstica y de tratamiento. 26° Congreso Argentino de Psiquiatría, Asociación de Psiquiatras Argentinos, Mar del Plata, Hotel Sheraton, 21-24 Abril 2010
- Psicofarmacología del espectro ¿border-bipolar? 17° Congreso Internacional de Psiquiatría, Asociación Argentina de Psiquiatras, Buenos Aires, Hotel Sheraton, 27-30 septiembre 2010.
- Burn Out. 16° Congreso Internacional de Psiquiatría, Asociación Argentina de Psiquiatras, Buenos Aires, Hotel Sheraton Libertador, 3-6 Octubre 2009.
- Viñetas Clínicas Interactivas: Actualidad diagnóstica y de tratamiento. 25° Congreso Argentino de Psiquiatría, Asociación de Psiquiatras Argentinos, Mar del Plata, Hotel Sheraton, 22-25 Abril 2009.
- Impulsividad/Vulnerabilidad. ¿Tratamiento psicofarmacológico y/o Resiliencia. Simposio Pipelines Drugs, Buenos Aires, Hotel Caesar Park, 4 Noviembre 2008.
- Qué significa ser Atípico en el tratamiento de las psicosis. Riesgos y Beneficios. Utilidad de un nuevo Antipsicótico Atípico. 23° Congreso Argentino de Psiquiatría, Asociación de Psiquiatras Argentinos, Mar del Plata, Hotel Sheraton, 19-22 Abril 2007.
- Tratamiento de la Depresión en el largo plazo. Simposio Neurociencias, Buenos Aires, Hotel Piazzola, 29 Agosto 2005
- Controversial question: Should psychomotor retardation be considered as a good prognostic factor in the treatment of depression?, Medicographia 2003; 25 (74): 47.
- Escitalopram in the treatment of mayor depression disorder with anxiety in a routine clinical outpatient clinic. Fernández L., Bronstein R., Schaumann C., Pedemonte P. Moizeszowicz J., 24th. CINP Congress, Collegium Internationale Neuro-Psychofarmacologicum, París, Francia, 20-24 junio 2004.
- Atípicos, antipsicóticos de vanguardia. Diario La Nación, 17-18 abril de 2004.
- Growth Hormone Neurosecretory Disfunction in Major Depressive Illness. Fiasche R., Fideleff H., Moizeszowicz J., Frieder P., Pagano SM., Holland M., Psychoneuroendocrinology 1995; 20: 727-733.
- "Tratamiento Psicofarmacológico en Clínica de Día". En Moizeszowicz J., Psicofarmacología Psicodinámica III: Nuevos enfoques clínico-terapéuticos. Editorial Paidós, Buenos Aires, 1994, Capítulo 14, págs. 715–730. (ISBN 978-950-12-3139-7).
- "Tratamiento Psicofarmacológico de la Bulimia Nerviosa". En Moizeszowicz J., Psicofarmacología Psicodinámica III: Nuevos enfoques clínico-terapéuticos. Editorial Paidós, Buenos Aires, 1994, Capítulo 12, págs. 681–691. (ISBN 978-950-12-3139-7).
- Psicofármacos y Terapia por la Palabra, en un Sobrio Debate. Diario Tiempo Argentino, 30 marzo 1983.
- Como Combatir la Depresión, Diario Clarín, 2 diciembre 1983.
- Effects of a New Benzodiazepine Derivative in Anxious Patients with gastrointestinal Disorders. Laudano O., Peralta M., Luján L., Aparicio N., Moizeszowicz J., Journal of Clinical Pharmacology 1977; 17: 441–446.
- Controlled Trial of Nomifensin and Viloxazine in the Treatment of Depression in the Elderly. Moizeszowicz J., Subirá S., Journal of Clinical Pharmacology 1977; 17: 81–83.
- Utilidad de la Diferenciación de Benzodiacepinas en el Tratamiento de la Ansiedad. Chappa H., Moizeszowicz J., Prensa Médica Argentina 1976; 63: 339–342.
- Tratamiento de las Neurosis Depresivas-Ansiosas con un Nuevo Psicofármaco: Nomifensin. Chappa H., Levin E., Moizeszowicz J., Acta Psiquiátrica y Psicología de América Latina 1976; 22: 133–138.
- Evaluación del Insomnio por Escalas de Autoadministración. Effectividad de un Nuevo Hipnótico Benzodiacepínico Soluble. Moizeszowicz J., Cúneo G., Guitelman A., Semana Médica 1976; 149: 116–120.
- A Double Blind Comparative Trial of Nomifensin and Desipramine in Depression. Relation Between Treatment and Phenylethylamine Excretion. Acebal E., Subirá S., Spatz H., Faleni R., Merzbacher B., Gales A., Moizeszowicz J., European Journal of Clinical Pharmacology 1976; 10: 109–113.
- Evaluation of the Psychotropic Effect of Etifoxina through Pursuit Rotor Performance and Galvanic Skin Response. Córsico R., Moizeszowicz J., Bursuk L., Rovaro E., Psychopharmacology (Berl) 1976; 45: 301–303.
- Actualización en la Evaluación Clínica de Psicofármacos. Acta Psiquiátrica y Psicológica de América Latina 1975; 21: 41–51.
- Neurocognitive Components of Chronic Schizophrenia. Fiszbein, A., Opler, L.A., Kay S. R., Rosenkilde, C.E., Ramirez, P. M., Moizeszowicz, J., and Gorelick, A. S. Program and Papers on New Research Syllabus, The One Hundred and Forty-Fourth Meeting of the American Psychiatric Association, New Orleans, USA, 1991; NR3.
