= Doctor–patient relationship =

Relationship between a doctor and their patient

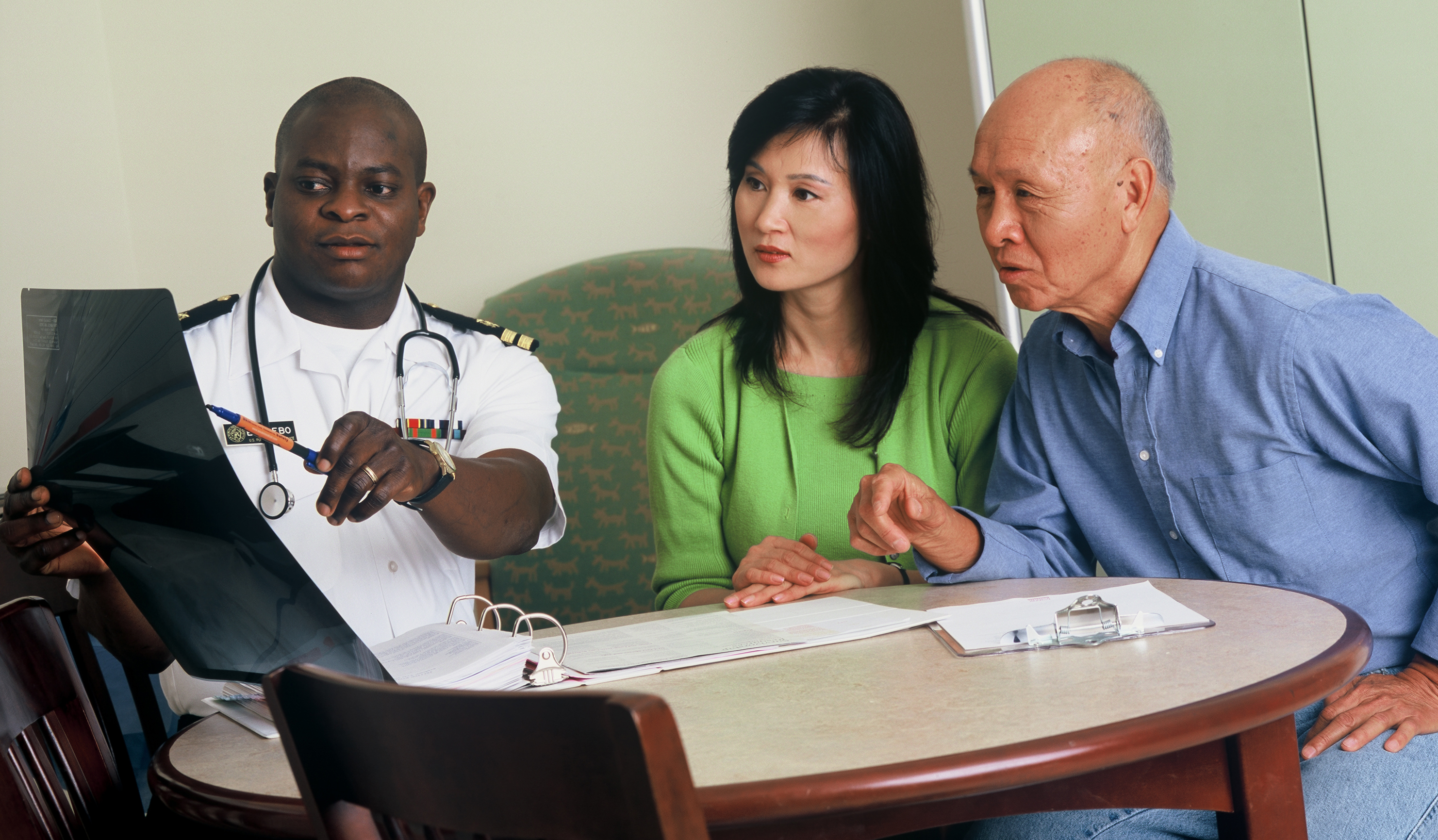
A medical practitioner explains an x-ray to the patient.

The doctor–patient relationship is a central part of health care and the practice of medicine. A doctor–patient relationship is formed when a doctor attends to a patient's medical needs and is usually through consent. This relationship is built on trust, respect, communication, and a common understanding of both the doctor and patients' sides. The trust aspect of this relationship goes is mutual: the doctor trusts the patient to reveal any information that may be relevant to the case, and in turn, the patient trusts the doctor to respect their privacy and not disclose this information to outside parties.

A ceremonial dynamic of the doctor–patient relationship is that the doctor is encouraged by the Hippocratic Oath to follow certain ethical guidelines. Additionally, the healthiness of a doctor–patient relationship is essential to keep the quality of the patient's healthcare high as well as to ensure that the doctor is functioning at their optimum. In more recent times, healthcare has become more patient-centered and this has brought a new dynamic to this ancient relationship.

== Importance ==
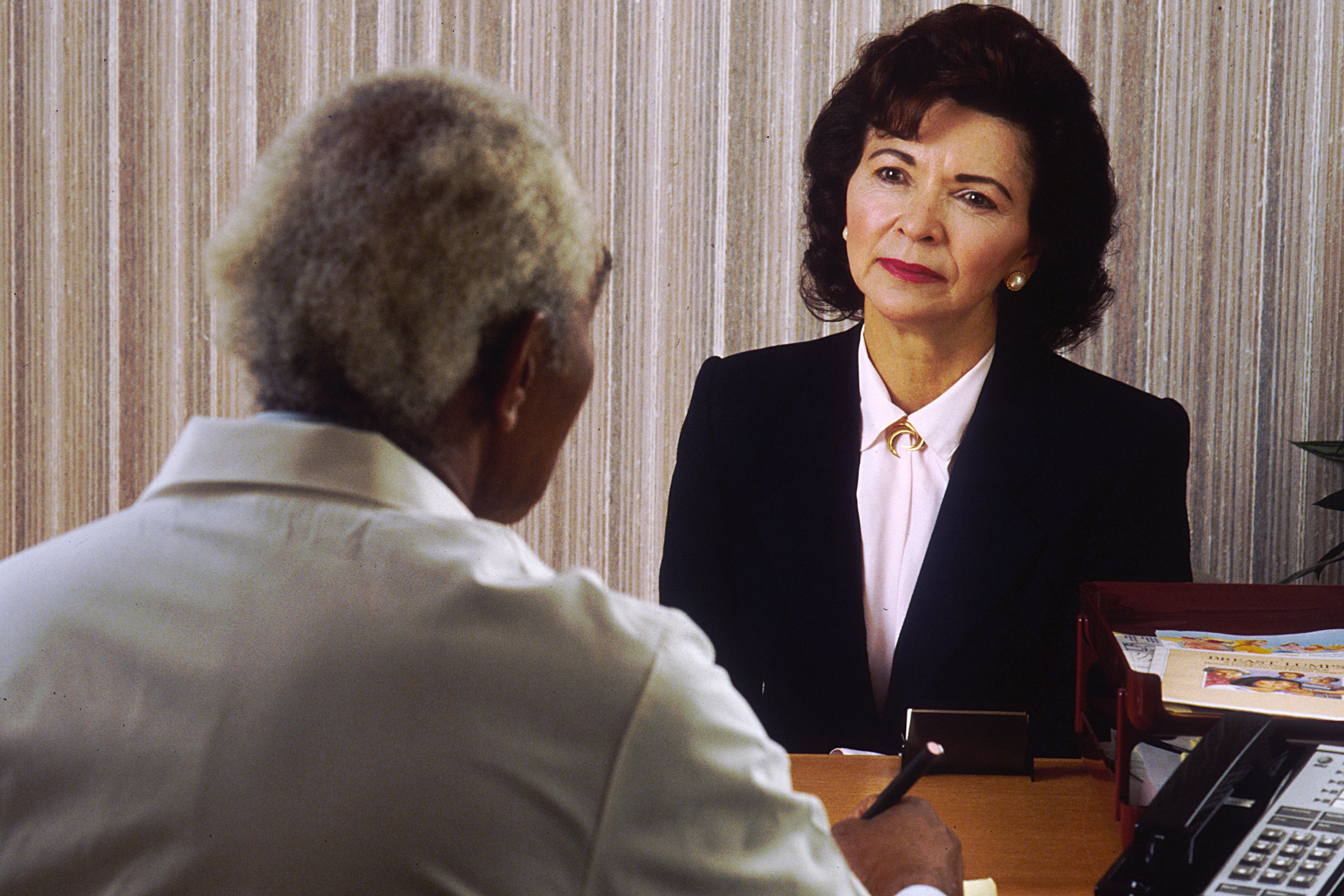
The doctor is providing medical advice to this patient.

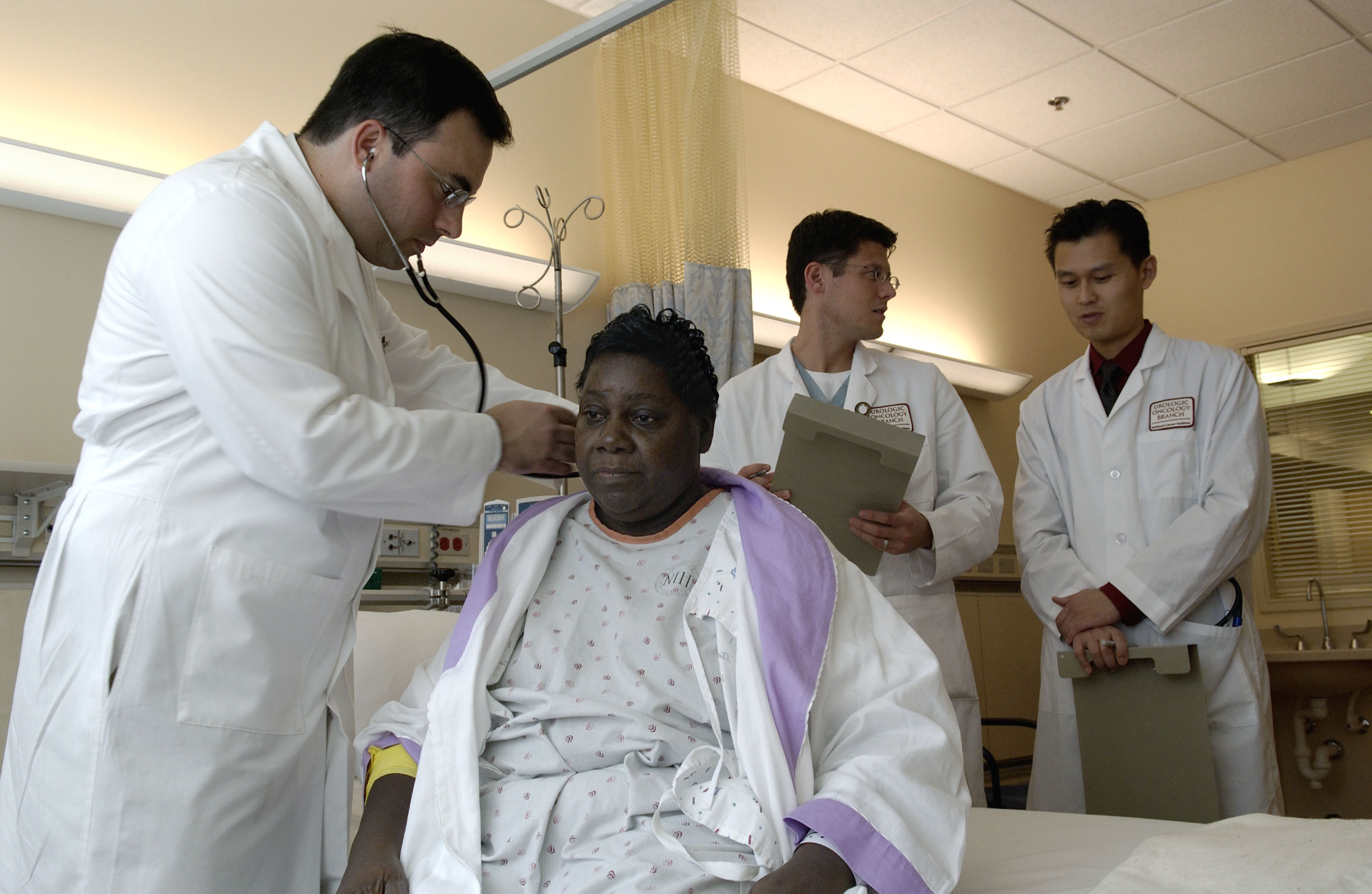
A physician performs a standard physical examination on his patient.

A patient must have confidence in the competence of their physician and must feel that they can confide in them. For most physicians, the establishment of a good rapport with a patient is important. Some medical specialties, such as psychiatry and family medicine, emphasize the physician–patient relationship more than others, such as pathology or radiology, which have very little contact with patients.

The quality of the patient–physician relationship is important to both parties. The doctor and patient's values and perspectives about disease, life, and time available play a role in building up this relationship. A strong relationship between the doctor and patient may lead to frequent, freely-offered quality information about the patient's disease and as a result, better healthcare for the patient and their family. Enhancing both the accuracy of the diagnosis and the patient's knowledge about the disease contributes to a good relationship between the doctor and the patient. In a poor doctor–patient relationship, the physician's ability to make a full assessment may be compromised and the patient may be more likely to distrust the diagnosis and proposed treatment. The downstream effects of this mistrust may include decreased patient adherence to the physician's medical advice, which could result in poorer health outcomes for the patient. In these circumstances, and also in cases where there is genuine divergence of medical opinions, a second opinion from another physician may be sought, or the patient may choose to go to another physician that they trust more. Additionally, the benefits of any placebo effect are also based upon the patient's subjective assessment (conscious or unconscious) of the physician's credibility and skills.

Michael and Enid Balint together pioneered the study of the physician patient relationship in the UK. Michael Balint's "The Doctor, His Patient and the Illness" (1957) outlined several case histories in detail and became a seminal text. Their work is continued by the Balint Society, The International Balint Federation and other national Balint societies in other countries. It is one of the most influential works on the topic of doctor–patient relationships. In addition, a Canadian physician known as Sir William Osler was known as one of the "Big Four" professors at the time that the Johns Hopkins Hospital was first founded. At the Johns Hopkins Hospital, Osler had invented the world's first medical residency system. In terms of efficacy (i.e. the outcome of treatment), the doctor–patient relationship seems to have a "small, but statistically significant impact on healthcare outcomes". However, due to a relatively small sample size and a minimally effective test, researchers concluded additional research on this topic is necessary. Recognizing that patients receive the best care when they work in partnership with doctors, the UK General Medical Council issued guidance for both of doctors named "Ethical guidance for doctors", as well as for patients "What to expect from your doctor" in April 2013.

== Evolution ==
The doctor-patient relationship has changed drastically over the course of history. Originally called a “priest-supplicant relationship” in Ancient Egypt, as doctors were then known as “magicians and priest”. Then, during the Greek enlightenment there was also evidence of this relationship being present. During this time the Greeks had made some break throughs in medicine and had further developed their own version of a doctor patient relationship. They established what was known as the “Hippocratic Oath”. This was a code that would say how a doctor should act towards their patients . This code made it where the health of the patient was put before their “class or status”. This was the turning point for how doctor and patient relationships would be like. These events helped to shape how the doctor and patient relationships would be viewed in the future.

The doctor's patient relationship was previously mentioned throughout history but in the past patients were all taken care of the same way and they had only a few guidelines that involved things such as age and the allergies. Going into 1700 there were very few doctors, and their patients were mostly people from the upper class, but this all changed in the 18th century. During this time the first few hospitals, and doctors, began to get to know the patient by gathering more information on their patients and the symptoms instead of just assumptions. This is because of medical advancements that doctors need to know more about the patients, so they then are able to pinpoint the exact cause of how or what they are feeling (4). These critical moments in history help to improve the overall health of the patients but also improve the relationship between doctors and patients.

== Aspects of relationship ==
=== Informed consent ===
The default medical practice for showing respect to patients and their families is for the doctor to be truthful in informing the patient of their health and to be direct in asking for the patient's consent before giving treatment. Historically in many cultures there has been a shift from paternalism, the view that the "doctor always knows best", to the idea that patients must have a choice in the provision of their care and be given the right to provide informed consent to medical procedures. There can be issues with how to handle informed consent in a doctor–patient relationship; for instance, with patients who do not want to know the truth about their condition. Furthermore, there are ethical concerns regarding the use of placebo. Does giving a sugar pill lead to an undermining of trust between doctor and patient? Is deceiving a patient for his or her own good compatible with a respectful and consent-based doctor–patient relationship? These types of questions come up frequently in the healthcare system and the answers to all of these questions are usually far from clear but should be informed by medical ethics.

=== Shared decision making ===
Health advocacy messages such as this one encourage patients to talk with their doctors about their healthcare.

Shared decision-making involves both the doctor and patient being involved in decisions about treatment. There are varied perspectives on what shared decision making involves, but the most commonly used definition involves the sharing of information by both parties, both parties taking steps to build consensus, and reaching an agreement about treatment.

The doctor does not recommend what the patient should do, rather the patient's autonomy is respected and they choose what medical treatment they want to have done. An alternative practice, for the doctor to make a person's health decisions without considering that person's treatment goals or having that person's input into the decision-making process, is considered grossly unethical and against the idea of personal autonomy and freedom.

The spectrum of a physician's inclusion of a patient into treatment decisions is well represented in Ulrich Beck's World at Risk. At one end of this spectrum is Beck's Negotiated Approach to risk communication, in which the communicator maintains an open dialogue with the patient and settles on a compromise on which both patient and physician agree. A majority of physicians employ a variation of this communication model to some degree, as it is only with this technique that a doctor can maintain the open cooperation of his or her patient. At the opposite end of this spectrum is the Technocratic Approach to risk communication, in which the physician exerts authoritarian control over the patient's treatment and pushes the patient to accept the treatment plan with which they are presented in a paternalistic manner. This communication model places the physician in a position of omniscience and omnipotence over the patient and leaves little room for patient contribution to a treatment plan.

=== Physician communication style ===
Physician communication style is crucial to the quality and strength of the doctor–patient relationship. Patient-centered communication, which involves asking open-ended questions, having a warm disposition, encouraging emotional expression, and demonstrating interest in the patient's life, has been shown to positively affect the doctor–patient relationship. Additionally, this type of communication has been shown to decrease other negative attitudes or assumptions the patient might have about doctors or healthcare as a whole, and has even been shown to improve treatment compliance. Another form of communication beneficial to the patient-provider relationship is self-disclosure by the physician in particular. Historically, medical teaching institutions have discouraged physicians from disclosing personal or emotional information to patients, as neutrality and professionalism were prioritized. However, self-disclosure by physicians has been shown to increase rapport, the patient's trust, their intention to disclose information, and the patient's desire to continue with the physician. These effects were shown to be associated with empathy, which is another important dimension which is often under-emphasized in physician training. A physician's response to emotional expression by their patient can also determine the quality of the relationship, and influence how comfortable patients are in discussing sensitive issues, feelings, or information that may be critical for their diagnosis or care. More passive, neutral response styles which allow for patients to elaborate on their feelings have been shown to be more beneficial for patients, and make them feel more comfortable. Physician avoidance or dismissal of a patient's emotional expression may discourage the patient from opening up, and may be harmful to their relationship with their provider.

=== Physician superiority ===
Historically, in the paternalistic model, a physician tended to be viewed as dominant or superior to the patient due to the inherent power dynamic of physician's control over the patient's health, treatment course, and access to knowledge about their condition. In this model, physicians tended to convey only the information necessary to convince the patient of their proposed treatment course. The physician–patient relationship is also complicated by the patient's suffering (patient derives from the Latin patior, "suffer") and limited ability to relieve it without the physician's intervention, potentially resulting in a state of desperation and dependency on the physician. A physician should be aware of these disparities in order to establish a comfortable, trust-based environment and optimize communication with the patient. Additionally, it may be beneficial for the doctor–patient relationship to create a practice of shared care with increased emphasis on patient empowerment in taking a greater degree of responsibility for their care.

Patients who seek a doctor's help typically do not know or understand the medical science behind their condition, which is why they go to a doctor in the first place. A patient with no medical or scientific background may not be able to understand what is going on with their body without their doctor explaining it to them. As a result, this can be a frightening and frustrating experience, filled with a sense of powerlessness and uncertainty for the patient, though in rare conditions, this pattern tends not to be followed, and due to lack of expertise patients are forced to learn about their conditions.

Discussing diagnoses, laboratory results, and treatment options and outcomes in plain language that patients can understand may provide reassurance and give them a greater sense of agency over their condition. Clear communication between physicians and patients can also strengthen the physician–patient relationship and promote treatment adherence and improved health outcomes. In a randomized trial in a German neurosurgical outpatient clinic, giving patients an AI-generated lay summary of their medical documents before the consultation was associated with higher patient-rated shared decision making, whereas physicians rated the autonomy support they had provided slightly lower.

=== Coercion ===
Under certain conditions healthcare workers are able to treat patients involuntarily, imprison them, or involuntarily administer drugs to alter the patients' ability to think. They may also engage in forms of "informal coercion" where information or access to social services can be used to control a patient.

=== Deception ===
Lying in the doctor–patient relationship is common. Doctors provide minimal information to patients after medical errors. Doctors may lie to patients to displace culpability for poor outcomes and say they avoid giving patients information because it may confuse patients, cause pain, or undermine hope. They may lie to avoid uncomfortable conversation about disability or death, or to encourage patients to accept a particular treatment option. The experience of being lied to may undermine an individual's trust in others or themselves and reduce faith in one's church, community or society and result in avoidant behaviour to avoid being wounded. Patients may seek financial and legal retribution.

Patients may lie to doctors for financial reasons such as to receive disability payments, for access to medication, or to avoid incarceration. Patients may lie out of embarrassment or shame. Palmeira and Sterne suggest that healthcare workers acknowledging the motivations of patients to lie to appear in a positive light to reduce deception by patients.

Palmeira and Sterne offer different psychological framings and motivations for lying. From the perspective of attachment theory, lying may be used to avoid revealing information about an individual, to avoid intimacy and therefore the risk of rejection or shame, or to exaggerate to obtain protection or care. They also discuss the idea of protecting or maintaining an ego ideal.Generally, Palmeira and Sterne suggestion discussions about the amount of information and detail parties wish to discuss, viewing obtaining truth as an ongoing process to increase truthfulness in doctor–patient interactions. Palmeira and Sterne suggest that physicians acknowledge their lack of knowledge, and discuss the amount of detail they wish to discuss to avoid deception.

== Models of a doctor-patient relationship ==
There are many different types of models that show the way a doctor-patient relationship is meant to be structured. The models are important because they help to provide a clear standard for how a doctor-patient relationship is supposed to be like. The first one is the “Active Passive Model.” This model is one of the oldest models. It is how the doctor treats a patient when they are unable to make decisions for themselves. This option is best for when there is a patient who is in a coma or when a doctor cannot postpone treating a patient because then it would risk their life. This option would not be best when you want a say in how you are treated. The next kind of model is the Guidance-cooperation model, this model is how the doctor has more knowledge on medical care than the patient. This option is best for when the patient is seeking medical advice from a doctor and they want to listen to the doctor .This model would not work out if the patient does not want to follow what the doctor is recommending to the patient, the goal is to have shared decision making. The patient in this model is expected to follow the doctor's recommendations. If the patient questions the doctor's recommendations, then that would change the type of model. Another kind of model is the “Mutual participation model”. This is based on where the doctor and patient both are involved in decision making and don't overpower each other. The limitation of this model is that when one party tries to overrule the other party, this causes this model to not work out. Overall, these models all help to shape how people in the medical field interact with their patients.

== Physician bias ==
Physicians have a tendency of overestimating their communication skills, as well as the amount of information they provide their patients. Extensive research conducted on 700 orthopedic surgeons and 807 patients, for instance, found that 75% of the surgeons perceived they satisfactorily communicated with their patients, whereas only 21% of the patients were actually satisfied with their communication. Physicians also show a high likelihood of underestimating their patients' information needs and desires, especially for patients who were not college educated or from economically disadvantaged backgrounds. There is pervasive evidence that patients' personal attributes such as age, sex, and socioeconomic status may influence how informative physicians are with their patients. Patients who are better educated and from upper or upper middle-class positions generally receive higher quality and quantity of information from physicians than do those toward the other end of the social spectrum, although both sides have an equal desire for information.

Race, ethnicity and language has consistently proven to have a significant impact on how physicians perceive and interact with patients. According to a study of 618 medical encounters between mainly Caucasian physicians and Caucasian and African American patients, physicians perceived African Americans to be less intelligent and educated, less likely to be interested in an active lifestyle, and more likely to have substance abuse problems than Caucasians. A study of patients of color showed that having a white physician led to increased experience of microaggressions. Studies in Los Angeles emergency departments have found that Hispanic males and African Americans were less than half as likely to receive pain medication than Caucasians, despite physicians' estimates that patients were experiencing an equivalent level of pain. Another study showed that ethnic-minority groups of varying races reported lower-quality healthcare experiences than non-Hispanic Whites, specifically in treatment decision involvement and information received regarding medications. Other studies show that physicians exhibited substantially less rapport building and empathetic behavior with both Black and Hispanic patients than Caucasians, despite the absence of language barriers.

=== Medical mistrust ===
Mistrust of physicians or the healthcare system in general falls under the umbrella of medical mistrust. Medical mistrust negatively impacts the doctor–patient relationship, as a patient who has little faith in their physician is less likely to listen to their advice, follow their treatment plans, and feel comfortable disclosing information about themselves. Some forms of communication by the physician, such as self-disclosure and patient-centered communication, have been shown to decrease medical mistrust in patients.

Medical mistrust has been shown to be greater for minority group patients, and is associated with decreased compliance, which can contribute to poorer health outcomes. Research of breast cancer patients showed that African American women who received concerning mammogram results were less likely to discuss this with their doctor if they had greater medical mistrust. Another study showed that women with higher physician mistrust waited longer to report symptoms to a doctor and receive a diagnosis of ovarian cancer. Two studies showed that African American patients had more medical mistrust than white patients, and were less likely to undergo a recommended surgery as a result.

Medical mistrust can also develop if physicians appear to be profit seeking. Physicians might alter how they communicate with patients about the price of care to avoid the appearance of pecuniary interest in order to secure their trust.

=== Benefiting or pleasing ===
A dilemma may arise in situations where determining the most efficient treatment, or encountering avoidance of treatment, creates a disagreement between the physician and the patient, for any number of reasons. In such cases, the physician needs strategies for presenting unfavorable treatment options or unwelcome information in a way that minimizes strain on the doctor–patient relationship while benefiting the patient's overall physical health and best interests. When the patient either can not or will not do what the physician knows is the correct course of treatment, the patient becomes non-adherent. Adherence management coaching becomes necessary to provide positive reinforcement of unpleasant options.

For example, according to a Scottish study, patients want to be addressed by their first name more often than is currently the case. In this study, most of the patients either liked (223) or did not mind (175) being called by their first names. Only 77 individuals disliked being called by their first name, most of whom were aged over 65. On the other hand, most patients do not want to call the doctor by his or her first name.

Some familiarity with the doctor generally makes it easier for patients to talk about intimate issues such as sexual subjects, but for some patients, a very high degree of familiarity may make the patient reluctant to reveal such intimate issues.

=== Patient Satisfaction ===
One factor of a doctor-patient relationship is patient satisfaction. There have been many studies done to study what helps with patient satisfaction. Multiple studies have recognized that communication is a key aspect of helping to improve overall patient satisfaction. In the article, it was found that even changing small factors in a doctor's way of communication can help to improve the overall satisfaction of a patient. The researchers also found that this was the trend for the other studies conducted as well. Teaching the staff in the hospital about how to interact with patients and encouraging them to take surveys on the satisfaction of their visit . By educating the staff about these techniques it will help the staff of the hospital continue to improve their patient satisfaction rates. Research has found that this can help build better patient-doctor relationships.

Another study was done that showed what specific things patients expected from their doctors to be satisfied with the care they were receiving. The study showed that patients don't want to feel inferior to the doctors just because of the intelligence gap. When they visit the doctors, they want the doctors to converse with people like they are an ordinary person, not a doctor. Another factor the study showed was that patients want to know that their doctor is following a standard of care, and they want to know that they are in good hands . Trust helps to build a professional relationship with your doctor, so without it, the care that is provided would not be as good as it would have been if there was trust. Lastly, when helping to build good doctor-patient relationships, research indicates that patient satisfaction, communication, and trust are the main factors that contribute to it.

=== Transitional care ===
Transitions of patients between health care practitioners may decrease the quality of care in the time it takes to reestablish proper doctor–patient relationships. Generally, the doctor–patient relationship is facilitated by continuity of care in regard to attending personnel. Special strategies of integrated care may be required where multiple health care providers are involved, including horizontal integration (linking similar levels of care, e.g. multiprofessional teams) and vertical integration (linking different levels of care, e.g. primary, secondary and tertiary care).

=== Turn-taking and conversational dominance ===
Researchers have studied the doctor–patient relationship using the theory of conversation analysis. One of the key concepts in conversation analysis is turn-taking. The process of turn-taking between health care professionals and the patients has a profound impact on the relationship between them. In most scenarios, a doctor will walk into the room in which the patient is being held and will ask a variety of questions involving the patient's history, examination, and diagnosis. These are often the foundation of the relationship between the doctor and the patient as this interaction tends to be the first they have together. This can go a long way into impacting the future of the relationship throughout the patient's care. All speech acts between individuals seek to accomplish the same goal, sharing and exchanging information and meeting each participants conversational goals.

Research carried out in medical scenarios analyzed 188 situations in which an interruption occurred between a physician and a patient. Of these 188 analyzed situations, research found that the doctor is much more likely (67% of the time, 126 occasions) as compared to the patient (33% of the time, 62 occasions). This shows that physicians are practicing a form of conversational dominance in which they see themselves as far superior to the patient in terms of importance and knowledge and therefore dominate all aspects of the conversation. A question that comes to mind considering this is if interruptions hinder or improve the condition of the patient. Constant interruptions from the patient whilst the doctor is discussing treatment options and diagnoses can be detrimental or lead to less effective efforts in patient treatment. This is extremely important to take note of as it is something that can be addressed in quite a simple manner. This research conducted on doctor–patient interruptions also indicates that males are much more likely to interject out of turn in a conversation than women. Men's social predisposition to interject becomes problematic when it negatively impacts a woman physician's messages to her patients who are men: she may not be able to finish her statements and the patient will not benefit from what she was about to say, and the physician herself may fall prey to the socially conventional man's interjection by letting it cut short her professional commentary. Conversely, men physicians need to encourage women patients to articulate their reactions and questions, since women interrupt in conversations statistically less often than men do.

A hurdle can arise from how the thinking process goes: a patient typically relates their story in chronological order, where symptoms, test results, consulting opinions, diagnoses and treatment are intertwined. A provider tends to design their approach in a step-by-step analytical manner, extracting as much details out of symptomatology, then past medical and social history then tests then coming to a suggested diagnosis and management plan. Addressing this upfront and at the onset of the visit and carving enough time for both can help avoid unnecessary interruptions on either part, improve provider-patient relation and constructively facilitate care.

When there is the perception of the end of a visit, a patient sometimes feels more like sharing their main concern, according to the "doorknob disclosure effect". Doorknob disclosure describes a pattern in which patients blurt out their main concerns at the last instant of a visit, as when the care provider is at the door ready to leave.

=== Other involved individuals ===
An example of where other people present in a doctor–patient encounter may influence their communication is one or more parents present at a minor's visit to a doctor. These may provide psychological support for the patient, but in some cases it may compromise the doctor–patient confidentiality and inhibit the patient from disclosing uncomfortable or intimate subjects.

When visiting a health provider about sexual issues, having both partners of a couple present is often necessary, and is typically a good thing, but may also prevent the disclosure of certain subjects, and, according to one report, increases the stress level.

Having family around when dealing with difficult medical circumstances or treatments can also lead to complications. Family members, in addition to the patient needing treatment may disagree on the treatment needing to be done. This can lead to tension and discomfort for the patient and the doctor, putting further strain on the relationship.

=== Telehealth ===
With the extensive use of technology in healthcare, a new dynamic has risen in this relationship. Telehealth is the use of telecommunications and/or electronic information to support a patient. This applies to clinical care, health-related education, and health administration. An important fact about telehealth is that it increases the quality of the doctor–patient relationship by making health resources more easily available, affordable, and more convenient for both parties. Challenges with using telehealth are that it is harder to get reimbursements, to acquire cross-state licensure, to have common standards, maintain privacy, and have proper guiding principles. The types of care that can be provided via telehealth include general health care (wellness visits), prescriptions for medicine, dermatology, eye exams, nutrition counseling, and mental health counseling. Just like with an in-person visit, it is important to prepare for a telehealth consultation beforehand and have good communication with the healthcare provider. More recently, artificial intelligence (AI) tools have begun to support telehealth encounters, with some studies finding that AI-generated responses to patient questions can be rated as more empathetic than those of physicians, a development that may have implications for the doctor–patient relationship.

An interesting outcome of telehealth is that doctors have started to play a different role in the relationship. With patients having more access to information, medical knowledge, and their health data; doctors play the role of a translator between technical data and the patients. This has caused a shift in the way that the doctors see themselves concerning the doctor–patient relationship. Doctors who are engaged in telehealth see themselves as a guide to the patient and undertake the role of a guardian and information manager in the description, collection, and sharing of their patient's data. This is the new dynamic that has risen in this ancient relationship and one which will continue to evolve.

== Bedside manner ==
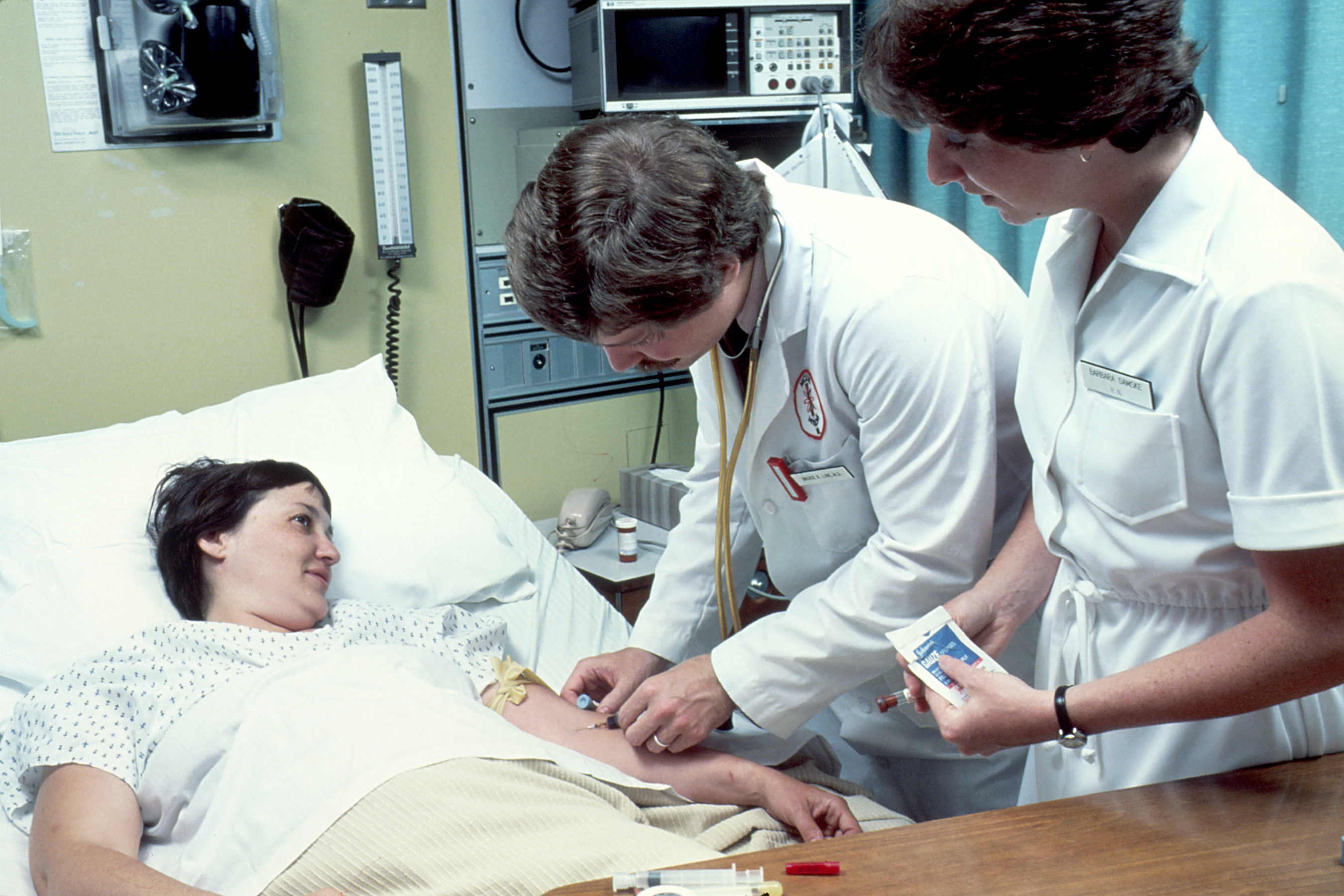
A medical doctor, with a nurse by his side, performs a blood test at a hospital in 1980.

- A good bedside manner is typically one that reassures and comforts the patient while remaining honest about a diagnosis. Historically, empathy in clinicians has often been loosely described as "good bedside manner".
- Vocal tones, body language, openness, presence, honesty, and concealment of attitude may all affect bedside manner.
- Poor bedside manner leaves the patient feeling unsatisfied, worried, frightened, or alone.
- Bedside manner becomes difficult when a healthcare professional must explain an unfavorable diagnosis to the patient, while keeping the patient from being alarmed.

Rita Charon launched the narrative medicine movement in 2001 with an article in the Journal of the American Medical Association. In the article, she claimed that better understanding the patient's narrative could lead to better medical care.

Researchers and Ph.D.s in a BMC Medical Education journal conducted a recent study that resulted in five key conclusions about the needs of patients from their health care providers. First, patients want their providers to provide reassurance. Second, patients feel anxious asking their providers questions; they want their providers to tell them it is okay to ask questions. Third, patients want to see their lab results and for the doctor to explain what they mean. Fourth, patients simply do not want to feel judged by their providers. And fifth, patients want to be participants in medical decision-making; they want providers to ask them what they want.

An example of how body language affects patient perception of care is that the time spent with the patient in the emergency department is perceived as longer if the doctor sits down during the encounter.

== Patient behavior ==
Rude behaviour by patients can have a negative effect on medical outcomes. A study showed that staff who received or witnessed rude behaviour by patients relatives had reduced ability to effectively carry out some of their simpler and more procedural tasks. This is important because if the medical staff are not performing sufficiently in what should be simple tasks, their ability to work effectively in critical conditions will also be impaired. This is consistent with research showing that rudeness by medical staff to one another decreases effectiveness.

== Examples in fiction ==
- Dr. Gregory House (of the show House) has an acerbic, insensitive bedside manner. However, this is an extension of his normal personality.
- In Grey's Anatomy, Dr. Burke compliments Dr. George O'Malley's ability to care for Dr. Bailey's baby by saying "it speaks to a good bedside manner."
- Doc Martin from the Doc Martin British TV series is a good example of a physician with a bad bedside manner.
- Dr Lily Chao from the British TV series Casualty is another example of a Foundation Doctor with a poor bedside manner, whereas her colleague Dr Ethan Hardy has a better one.
- In Lost, Hurley tells Jack Shephard that his bedside manner "sucks". Later in the episode, Jack is told by his father to put more hope into his sayings, which he does when operating on his future wife. The comments continue in other episodes of the series with Benjamin Linus sarcastically telling Jack that his "bedside manner leaves something to be desired" after Jack gives him a harsh negative diagnosis.
- In Closer, Larry the physician tells Anna when they first meet that he is famed for his bedside manner.
- In Scrubs, J.D is presented as an example of a physician with great bedside manner, while Elliot Reid is a physician with bad or non-existent bedside manner at first, until she evolves during her tenure at Sacred Heart. Dr. Cox is an interesting subversion, in that his manner is brash and undiplomatic while still inspiring patients to do their own best to aid in the healing process, akin to a drill sergeant. This show also comically remarked that the most time that a doctor needs to be in the presence of the patient before he finds out everything he needs to know is approximately 15 seconds.
- In Star Trek: Voyager, the Doctor often compliments himself on the charming bedside manner he developed with the help of Kes.
- In M*A*S*H, Hawkeye Pierce, Trapper John McIntyre, B.J. Hunnicutt, and Sherman Potter all possess a caring and humorous bedside manner meant to help patients cope with traumatic injuries. Charles Winchester initially possesses no real bedside manner, acting with detached professionalism, until the rigors of his job help him develop a sense of compassion for his patients. Frank Burns has a poor bedside manner, constantly minimizing the seriousness of his patients' injuries, accusing them of cowardice and goading them to return to the front lines.

== See also ==
- Aggression in healthcare
- Bullying in medicine
- Doctor–patient confidentiality
- Duty of candor
- Medical ethics
- Medical malpractice
- Patient abuse
- Physician
- Professional boundaries
- Patients' Welfare Association

== Further information ==
- Alexander GC, Casalino LP, Meltzer DO (August 2003). "Patient-physician communication about out-of-pocket costs". JAMA. 290 (7): 953–8. doi:10.1001/jama.290.7.953. PMID 12928475.
- Alexander GC, Casalino LP, Tseng CW, McFadden D, Meltzer DO (August 2004). "Barriers to patient-physician communication about out-of-pocket costs". J Gen Intern Med. 19 (8): 856–60. doi:10.1111/j.1525-1497.2004.30249.x. PMC 1492500. PMID 15242471.
- Alexander GC, Casalino LP, Meltzer DO (March 2005). "Physician strategies to reduce patients' out-of-pocket prescription costs". Arch. Intern. Med. 165 (6): 633–6. doi:10.1001/archinte.165.6.633. PMID 15795338.
- Alexander GC, Lantos JD (2006). "The doctor-patient relationship in the post-managed care era". Am J Bioeth. 6 (1): 29–32. doi:10.1080/15265160500394556. PMID 16423784. S2CID 8019757.
- Pham HH, Alexander GC, O'Malley AS (April 2007). "Physician consideration of patients' out-of-pocket costs in making common clinical decisions". Arch. Intern. Med. 167 (7): 663–8. doi:10.1001/archinte.167.7.663. PMID 17420424.
