= Clara Lazar Geroe =

Hungarian-Australian psychiatrist and psychoanalyst

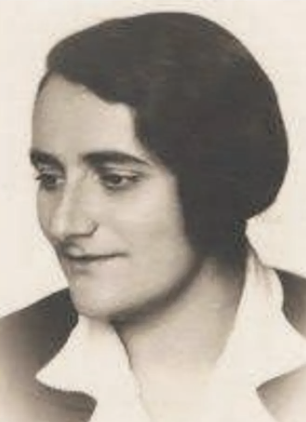
- Born: Klára Lazar; October 4, 1900; Pápa
- Died: February 12, 1980 (aged 79); Parkville Victoria, Australia
- Other name: Clara Lazar - Geroe
- Education: University of Pécs, Hungarian Psychoanalytical Society
- Known for: Australia's first full member of the British Psychoanalytical Society; appointed as Australia's first Training Analyst (1941)
- Partner(s): Vilmos Geroe, b. 25 December 1898

Clara Lazar Geroe born Klára Lazar (October 4, 1900 – February 12, 1980) was a Hungarian-Australian psychiatrist and psychoanalyst. She began practicing psychoanalysis in 1931 in Budapest and in 1940 in Melbourne.

== Life ==
Klara Lazar Geroe was born in Pápa in Hungary in 1900. Her Jewish parents were Ilona (born Lusztig) and her husband Adolf Adam Lazar, a well respected wholesale grocer. She attended the Pápa Calvinist Lyceum because she wanted to study medicine. This school provided the subjects she needed to matriculate. She had become interested in psychoanalysis after reading a book by Sandor Ferenczi. At the end of World War One, Hungary was in a political turmoil and this chaos affected her education. Due to the Numerous Clausus Act of 1920 she was obliged to leave Hungary in 1920 to study at university, initially in Prague, before finally returning to Hungary in 1923 to complete her medical degree at the University of Pécs. She was then appointed to the Apponyi Clinic in Budapest under the direction of psychologist Dr Pal Ranschburg, working as a neurologist while simultaneously commencing psychoanalytic training.

Known as Dr Klara Lazar, Geroe was one of Michael Balint's students. She began her psychoanalytic training with a cohort of candidates in the Hungarian Psychoanalytical Society in 1926. Upon qualifying in March 1931 she became a full member of the Hungarian Psychoanalytical society and member of the International Psychoanalytical Association

Geroe specialised in pedagogic psychoanalysis, and, in addition to private practice, worked at the Society's Polyclinic. In 1932, in collaboration with her colleague Margaret Dubovitz, she took charge of the educational guidance service. She also ran a clinic for the organisation- the 'Friends of Children of Hungarian Labourers'. She lectured to parents and teachers about child development in partnership with senior members of the Hungarian Psychoanalytical Society. Geroe was appointed by the Society as a training analyst for pedagogues in 1938.

With the rise in Naziism during the 1930s life was increasingly difficult for Jews. After the Anschluss in Vienna on 11 March 1938 the British Psychoanalyst and Secretary of the British Psychoanalytical SocietyJohn Rickman advised Jewish analysts in Hungary to leave, as well as supporting Ernest Jones's efforts for the migration of Viennese analysts including Freud himself. Geroe discussed going to New Zealand in a party of six Hungarian analysts but their application was refused. Geroe and two of her colleagues Andrew Peto and Elisabeth Kardos then turned to Australia. After much lobbying, particularly from Duncan Hall, the Australian born Colonial Secretary at the League of Nations, and several Australian doctors including British Psychoanalytical Society Associate Roy Coupland Winn in Sydney, and in Melbourne Dr Paul Dane, all of their applications were successful. Only Geroe and her family emigrated. Peto and Kardos decided to remain in Hungary. Clara Gero and her husband, Vilmos (William) and son, George, arrived in Melbourne on 13 March 1940.

Upon her arrival in Melbourne Clara Geroe had understood she was to be employed at the newly founded Melbourne Institute for Psychoanalysis. However negotiations with the donor, Lorna Traill, the daughter of a shipping businessman were difficult and took many months to resolve. While the Melbourne Institute of Psychoanalysis was formally launched on 11 October 1940, it finally opened its doors for business on 15 January 1941. In its first annual report (1941)Geroe listed patient referrals and treatment, the work of the Children's Clinic, and her public education activities. As a refugee doctor in Australia Clara Geroe was not able to gain registration to practice unless she studied the final three years of an Australian medical degree. She was therefore recognised to be, technically, a 'lay analyst' for many years. Appointed as a Training Analyst by the British Psychoanalytical Society in July 1941, she established weekly Study Groups attended by doctors and lay professionals and began training psychoanalytic candidates. Echoing her experience in Budapest, Geroe provided lectures to the public:teachers, parents, kindergarten teaching students and educationists and officers of the children's court, among them.

Registration as an Australian medical practitioner finally occurred in 1956 - a result of legislative changes favoring the registration of refugee doctors who had made significant contributions to Australian society. Geroe had long established herself as a Psychoanalyst, training candidates from both the medical and non medical professions from her rooms at 111 Collins Street, Melbourne. Together with her colleague and Hungarian Emigre Andrew Peto who finally arrived in Australia in 1949 and Roy Coupland Winn, Geroe supported the opening of the Sydney Institute of Psychoanalysis in 1951 and overseen the establishment of the Australian Association of Psychoanalysts in December 1952 – the forerunner of the Australian Psychoanalytical Society.

Geroe continued her practice as a psychoanalyst until her death. She died in Parkville in 1980.
