= Judith Dupont =

French psychoanalyst and translator (1925–2025)

- Born: 22 September 1925; Budapest, Hungary
- Died: 1 October 2025 (aged 100); Paris, France
- Parents: Ladislas Dormandi (father); Olga Dormandi (mother)

Judith Dupont (22 September 1925 – 1 October 2025) was a French psychoanalyst, translator, and editor.

== Life and career ==
Dupont was born in Budapest on 22 September 1925. Her father Ladislas Dormandi was a publisher and writer, and her mother, Olga Dormandi, was a painter. Dupont migrated to France with her family in 1938. She studied medicine in Paris, graduating in pathological anatomy in 1955. She is noted for translating and publishing the works of Sándor Ferenczi, helping to introduce his works to the French public. In 1969, she published the psycho-analytical journal Coq-Héron, which was one of the first to publish papers by Sándor Ferenczi and Michael Balint.

Dupont died in Paris on 1 October 2025, at the age of 100.

== Distinctions ==
- Sigourney Award (2013)

== Publications ==
=== Works ===
- Au fil du temps... Un itinéraire analytique, Paris, CampagnePremière, 2015, ISBN 2372060139.
- Le manuel à l'usage des enfants qui ont des parents difficiles (pseudon. Jeanne Van Den Brouck), préface de Françoise Dolto, Paris, Jean-Pierre Delarge, 1980, rééd. Le Seuil, Point virgule No. 17, 2006 ISBN 202089226X.

=== Journal editions ===
- Avec Michelle Moreau Ricaud, co-édition de trois numéros spéciaux sur Balint, The American Journal of Psychoanalysis, March 2002, vol.62, No. 1. et 62, No. 4, September 2004, vol. 64, No. 3.

=== Articles and chapters ===
- Publier un tel livre n’est pas anodin..., in D. Platier Zeitoun, J. Polard (dir.), Vieillir… Des psychanalystes parlent, Erès, 2009.
- Qu’est-ce que l’état de santé. Le point de vue de Michael Balint, Revue française de psychosomatique, No. 36 2009.
- L’éducatif dans la psychanalyse, Le Coq-Héron, No. 199, «Psychanalyse et éducation», Erès, 2009, en ligne.
- Pour une pédagogie psychanalytique, in François Marty et Florian Houssier (dir.), Éduquer l’adolescent ? Nîmes, Champ social, 2007.
- L’humour dans la correspondance Freud/Ferenczi, in Stéphane Michaud (dir), Correspondances de Freud, p. 59-68, Presses Sorbonne Nouvelle, 2007.
- La notion de trauma selon Ferenczi et ses effets sur la recherche psychanalytique ultérieure, Filigrane, 2008.
- Repères sur la question du trauma : Freud, Balint, Abraham et Torok, in Jean Claude Rouchy (dir), La psychanalyse avec Nicolas Abraham et Maria Torok, p. 77-79, coll. « Transition », Erès, 2001 ISBN 2-86586-915-6.

=== Translations and editions ===
- Sándor Ferenczi
  - Thalassa. Psychanalyse des origines de la vie sexuelle, présentée par Nicolas Abraham, traduction de Judith Dupont et Myriam Viliker, Paris : Payot, 2000.
  - Œuvres complètes I, 1908-1912. Psychanalyse I / Sandor Ferenczi, traduction de Judith Dupont avec la collaboration du Dr Philippe Garnier, préface de Michael Balint / Paris : Payot, 1968.
  - Œuvres complètes II, 1913-1919. Psychanalyse 2, traduction de Judith Dupont et de Myriam Viliker, avec la collaboration du Dr Philippe Garnier, préface de Michael Balint / Paris : Payot, 1978.
  - Œuvres complètes, III, 1919-1926. Psychanalyse 3, traduction de Judith Dupont et Myriam Viliker, Paris : Payot, 1982.
  - Œuvres complètes IV, 1927-1933, traduit par l'équipe du Coq Héron (J. Dupont, S. Hommel, P. Sabourin et al.), préface de Pierre Sabourin, introduction de Michael Balint, Paris : Payot, 1982.
  - Journal clinique : janvier-octobre 1932, préface de Michael Balint, traduit par l'équipe de traduction du Coq Héron, avant-propos de Judith Dupont, postface de Pierre Sabourin, Paris : Payot, 2014.
  - Transfert et introjection, traduit par Judith Dupont avec la collaboration de Philippe Garnier, préface de Simone Korff-Sausse, Paris : Éd. Payot & Rivages, 2013.
  - Perspectives de la psychanalyse : sur l'indépendance de la théorie et de la pratique, avec Otto Rank, traduit de l'allemand par Michèle Pollak-Cornillot, Judith Dupont et Myriam Viliker / Paris : Payot, 1994.
- Michael Balint
  - Techniques psychothérapeutiques en médecine, avec Enid Balint, traduit de l'anglais par Judith Dupont et Jean-Paul Valabrega, Paris : Payot, 1966.
  - Amour primaire et technique psychanalytique, traduit par J. Dupont, R. Gelly, S. Kadar, Paris : Payot, 1972.
  - Les Voies de la régression, avec une étude de Enid Balint, traduit par Myriam Viliker et Judith Dupont, Paris : Payot, 1981.
  - Le défaut fondamental : aspects thérapeutiques de la régression, traduit de l'anglais par Judith Dupont et Myriam Viliker, Paris : Payot, 2003.
- Correspondences
  - Correspondance : 1921-1933. Sandor Ferenczi, Georg Groddeck, traduction de l'allemand, notes et commentaires par le Groupe de traduction du Coq-Héron, préface par Judith Dupont, Paris : Payot, 1982.
  - La Correspondance Ernest Jones-Michael Balint, sous la responsabilité de Eva Brabant et Judith Dupont, Ramonville Saint-Agne : Erès, 2004.
  - Correspondance : 1907-1926, Sigmund Freud, Otto Rank, présentation et annotations de Patrick Avrane, traduit de l'allemand par Suzanne Achache-Wiznitzer, Judith Dupont et al. / Paris : CampagnePremière, 2015.
  - Correspondance : Sigmund Freud, Sándor Ferenczi, 1: 1908-1914 (1994), 2: 1914-1919 (1996), 3: 1920-1933 (2000), dir. André Haynal et l'équipe du Coq-Héron, Paris, Calmann-Lévy.
