= Ros Draper =

British therapist

Ros Draper is a therapist, supervisor, teacher, and writer, and has made major contributions to the development of family therapy in Britain. Positions held include Senior Clinical Lecturer at the Tavistock Clinic, London, Chair for the Institute of Family Therapy, and Birkbeck College, University of London MSc in a Systemic Approach to Management, Coaching and Consultation.

She has worked in both adult and child psychiatric settings. In 1988, Ros co-founded the influential Systemic Thinking and Practice book series and her title Teaching Family Therapy (1993) remains key text in the field. More recently, Ros has developed ways of using family therapy and systemic practice in primary care and educational settings and, in addition to her private practice, is a member of the teaching and therapy team at the Family Institute, Cardiff and at the Juniper Centre, an eating disorders service in Southampton. Ros Draper currently has a private practice in Hampshire and London.

Notable achievements as a writer and editor include creating (with David Campbell) the influential Systemic Thinking and Practice series, published by Karnac Books (London) and co-authoring (with Rudi Dallos) An Introduction to Family Therapy – Systemic Theory and Practice, considered key reading for students and practitioners of family therapy and systemic practice.

== Bibliography ==
- Draper, Ros; Gower, Myrna; Huffington, Clare (1991). Teaching family therapy. London: Karnac Books. ISBN 978-1-85575-021-0.
- Dallos, Rudi; Draper, Ros (2010). An Introduction to Family Therapy (3rd ed.). Maidenhead: McGraw-Hill International (UK) Ltd. ISBN 978-0-335-23801-9.
- Dallos, Ros; Campbell, David; Huffington, Clare (1992). Second Thoughts on the Theory and Practice of the Milan Approach to Family Therapy (The Systemic Thinking and Practice Series) (1st ed.). Routledge. ISBN 978-1855750142.
