= Tavistock and Portman NHS Foundation Trust =

London Psychotherapic Clinic

The Tavistock Centre – Tavistock and Portman NHS Foundation Trust
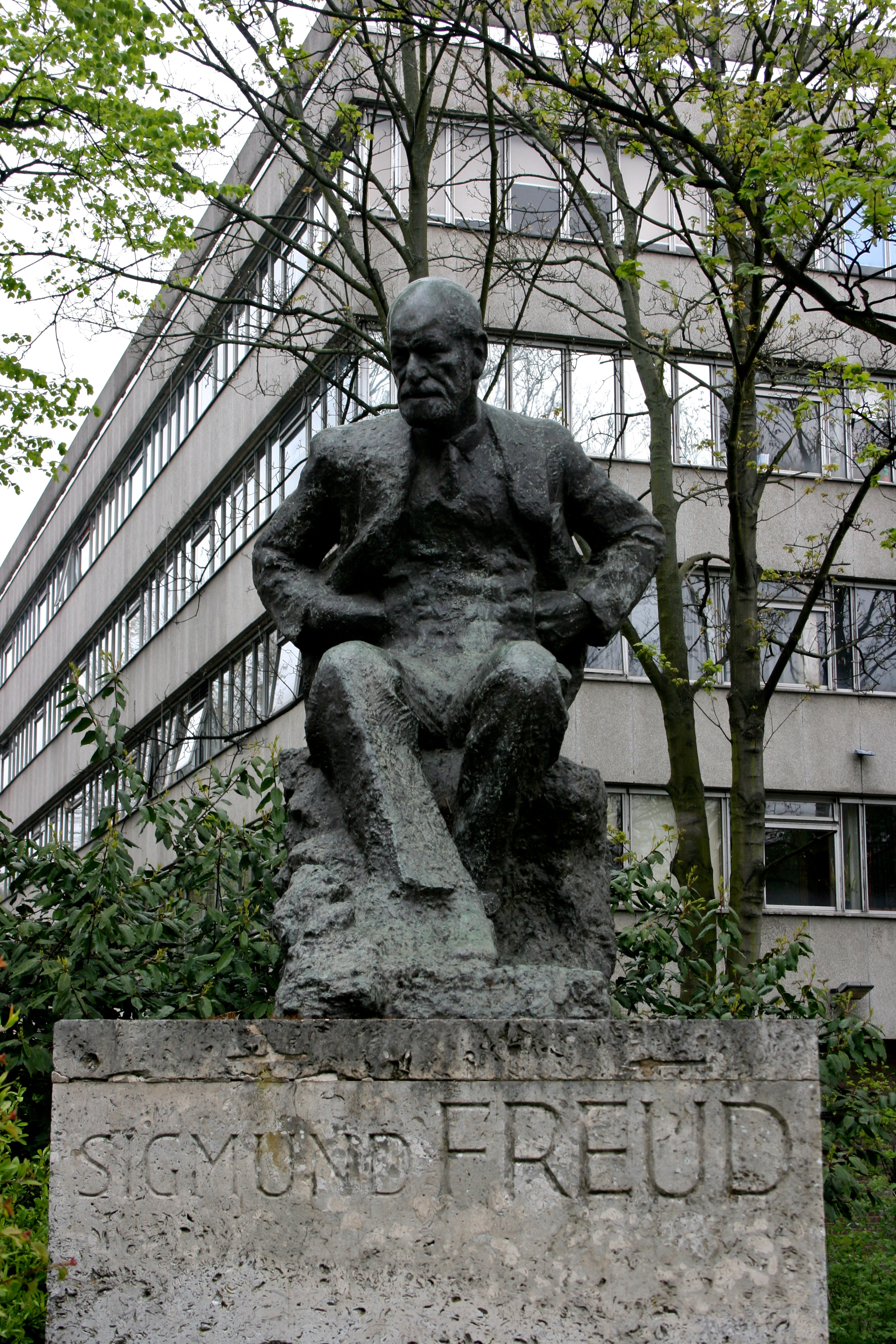
- Nemon's statue of Sigmund Freud, in front of the Tavistock Centre, London
- Formation: 1920
- Dissolved: March 31, 2026; 5 months ago
- Headquarters: London, United Kingdom
- Coordinates: 51.5466°N 0.1748°W
- Website: tavistockandportman.nhs.uk

The Tavistock and Portman NHS Foundation Trust was a specialist mental health trust based at the Tavistock Centre in Swiss Cottage in London, England. It specialised in talking therapies and operated an out-patient clinic model, keeping people in the community in the support networks of their families, friends and workplaces. It ran 33 mental health services and one specialist school. The Trust provided professional training and postgraduate studies. The education and training department ran over 100 courses and catered for 2,000 students a year from the United Kingdom and abroad. The Trust's third strand of activity was research and published widely on its own imprint as well as in scientific and medical journals.

On 1 April 2026, the Trust merged with North London NHS Foundation Trust, forming one of the largest community and mental health trusts in London.

== History ==
The Trust was originally founded as the Tavistock Clinic on 27 September 1920 by Hugh Crichton-Miller. Its original premises were at 51 Tavistock Square, which is where it took its name from. When it was founded, it had two departments, namely adults and children. Teaching and lecturing to other professional audiences also began almost as soon as the clinic opened.

By the end of the 1920s, the Tavistock Clinic needed to expand, so it became incorporated as a charity: The Tavistock Institute of Medical Psychology in 1929. Initially, this was to raise money for an extension, but by 1932 it had outgrown its premises in Bloomsbury. The Tavistock Clinic obtained a lease for a disused mews on the corner of Torrington Place and Malet Place by University College. This allowed for specialised clinical rooms with one-way mirrors as well as a lecture theatre that allowed the Clinic to develop an educational offering. In 1932 it was thanks to JA Hadfield that the Tavistock Clinic first got university recognition for its Diploma in Psychological Medicine from the University of London. Being a charity meant that the Clinic could also apply for grants and in 1936 it won its first research fellowship from the Rockefeller Foundation - ATM Wilson studied the peptic ulcer in its psychological and social aspects.

During World War 2 the Tavistock Clinic relocated to a temporary site in Hampstead after its central London sites were destroyed in the Blitz. Many of the staff took positions in the military, the then Director, J R Rees, was appointed consultant psychiatrist to the Army at Home and made responsible for the mental health of approximately three million people.

After the war, the Tavistock Clinic joined the NHS as a founding organisation in 1948, with its staff being the first to be paid by the new NHS from April 1948.

The immediate era after the war was a period of huge growth and innovation for the Tavistock Clinic. Wilfred Bion took charge of the Clinic and prepared it to join the NHS. He established the Tavistock Institute of Human Relations (TIHR) in 1948, which embodied a multi-disciplinary and integrative approach to the behavioural sciences. As this new organisation could not join the NHS with the Clinic, it was incorporated as a separate company. In 1948, Enid Balint founded the Family Discussion Bureau with Lily Pincus and Alison Lyons (later renamed the Tavistock Marital Studies Institute and now known as Tavistock Relationships, which still operates under the Tavistock Institute of Medical Psychology).

John Bowlby joined the Tavistock Clinic after World War 2 and took charge of the Children's Department. At the Tavistock Clinic, he began work that would eventually become significant to the field of human development: Attachment Theory, which explains how bonds between infants and caregivers shape everything that follows. Attachment theory has influenced several forms of contemporary psychotherapy.

The Tavistock and Portman NHS Trust was formed in 1994, when the Tavistock Clinic merged with the neighbouring Portman Clinic in Fitzjohns Avenue. The Portman specialises in areas of forensic psychiatry, including the treatment of addictive, sociopathic and criminal behaviours and tendencies.

It successfully became the Tavistock and Portman NHS Foundation Trust in 2006, one of the first mental health trusts to do so.

== Early history ==
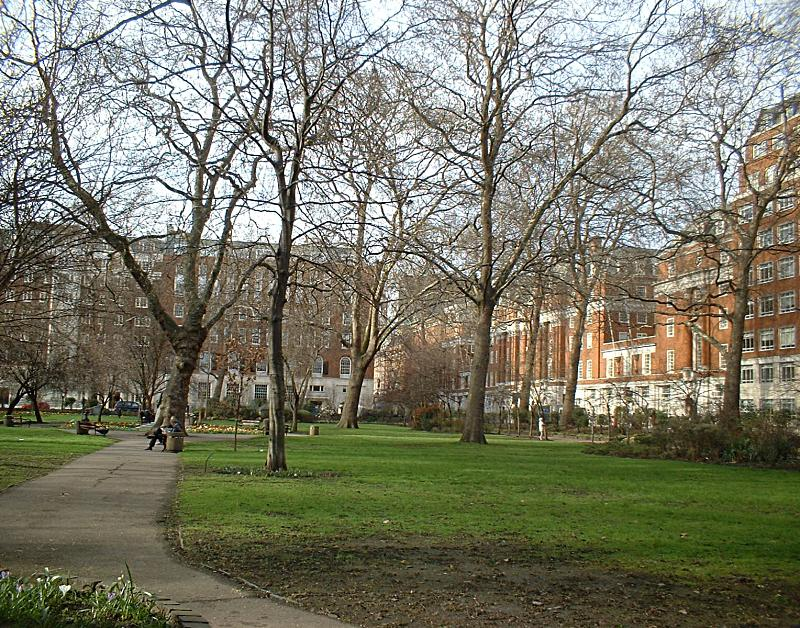
Tavistock Square in Bloomsbury, London, birthplace in 1920 of the Tavistock Clinic

It owes its name to its original location in Tavistock Square in central London. When it moved later to larger premises, it took its name with it. Although Hugh Crichton-Miller was a psychiatrist who developed psychological treatments for shell-shocked soldiers during and after the First World War, clinical services were always destined for both children and adults.. The clinic's first patient was a child. From its foundation, it was also clear that to offer free treatment to all who need it meant that the Tavistock Clinic needed to generate income by providing training to clinical professionals who could eventually help people across the UK and beyond. The clinical staff were also researchers. These principles remain influential to this day.

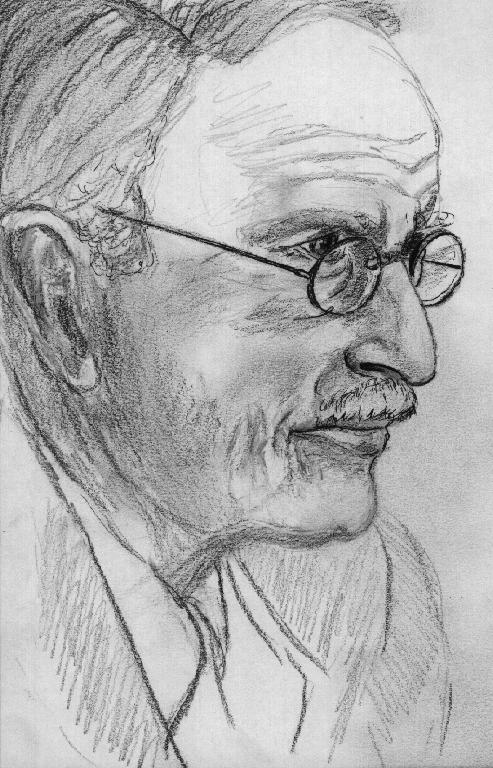
Carl Gustav Jung

Following its foundation, the Tavistock Clinic developed a focus on preventive psychiatry, expertise in group relations – including army officer selection, social psychiatry, and action research. There was an openness to different streams of research and thought, as, for instance, the famous series of lectures given by the Swiss psychiatrist and one-time collaborator of Sigmund Freud, Carl Jung, which were attended by doctors, churchmen and members of the public, including H. G. Wells and Samuel Beckett.

Its staff, who were still mainly unpaid honorary psychiatrists, psychologists and social workers, were interested in researching and consulting to leadership within the armed forces. The staff also offered treatment to members of the civilian population who might be traumatised by the prospect of a further world war, which could bring bombing of cities, evacuation of children and the shocks of loss and bereavement.

== Post-war history ==
After the Second World War, the Tavistock Clinic benefited from the Northfield Hospital experience and from the arrival of talented professionals from Europe, many fleeing Nazi persecution. In 1948, it became a leading clinic within the newly created National Health Service. At this point, its education and training services were managed separately by the Tavistock Institute for Medical Psychology, which was also the umbrella for the Tavistock Institute, involved in social action research and thinking about group relations and organisational dynamics, and for work with marital couples. The clinic was managed on a democratic model by a professional committee and further developed its distinct focus on multi-disciplinary and community-centred work. At the Clinic's centenary in 2020, many post-war Tavistock staff contributed personal chapters in "The Tavistock Century" (edited by Margot Waddell and Sebastian Kraemer, Phoenix Publishing House https://firingthemind.com/product/9781912691715/)

=== Children and young people ===
New developments in child and adolescent mental health were particularly fruitful in the immediate post-war period. In 1948, the creation of the children's department supported the development of training in child and adolescent psychotherapy. Dr John Bowlby supported this new training and naturalistic infant observation. He also developed Attachment Theory. Husband and wife clinicians James Robertson and Joyce Robertson showed in their film work the impact of separation in temporary substitute care on young children, for example, when their parent was admitted to hospital. The Australian Hazel Harrison was teacher-in-charge from 1954 to 1956, where she worked with Bowlby. They looked in detail at English pre-school education.

The Tavistock Clinic opened its Adolescent Department in 1959, recognising the distinctive developmental needs and difficulties of younger and older adolescents. In 1967, it absorbed the London Child Guidance Clinic, founded in 1929.

In 1989, the Tavistock established the Gender Identity Development Service (GIDS), a highly specialised clinic for young people presenting with difficulties with their gender identity. In July 2022, following a critical independent review from Hilary Cass, it was announced that this service would be discontinued and replaced with regional clinics providing a more "holistic" approach.

=== Training in education ===
By the 1960s, the Tavistock Clinic was also providing both 1-year and 4-year professional training courses in educational psychology, the latter embracing a teacher training element through Leicester University School of Education. For a number of years, the senior tutor and principal psychologist for these courses was Irene Caspari, who did much to promote the concept and practice of Educational therapy. In the 1970s, systemic psychotherapy became the Tavistock Clinic's newest professional training. Applications of the clinical ideas and skills of its multidisciplinary clinicians are at the heart of its education and training, with academically validated programmes developing from the early 1990s with the University of East London, and later with the University of Essex and Middlesex University.

=== Reflecting on the workplace ===
Work discussion, supervised clinical practice and experiential group relations work are central to many trainings, all of which aim to equip mental health workers with the emotional, organisational, and relational capacities to operate confidently in front-line settings. A BBC TV series 'Talking Cure: Jan' brought the work of the Clinic to a wider audience in 1999. Organisational consultancy by former CEO Anton Obholzer, featured in the TV series, and their edited collection, with Vega Roberts, 'The Unconscious at Work: Individual and Organizational Stress in the Human Services', remains one of the classic texts to emerge from the Tavistock Clinic.

=== Public sphere ===
The Tavistock's tradition of social and political engagement has been renewed in recent years through its programme of Policy Seminars which model a dialogic, exploratory approach to policy analysis and debate with the social epidemiologist, Richard G. Wilkinson, the psychologist, Oliver James and the columnist, Polly Toynbee, among recent contributors. The series of Thinking Space events follows a similar model of participatory engagement around themes of diversity, racism, and sexual orientation.

The Tavistock Institute, which had been part of the Tavistock family, moved to its own premises in 1994. The Tavistock Centre for Couples Relationships, TCCR, formerly the Tavistock Institute of Marital Studies, was always a separate, charitably-funded organisation which left the Tavistock Centre for new premises in 2009.

== NHS Trust ==
In 1994, the Tavistock Clinic joined with the Portman Clinic to become the Tavistock and Portman NHS Trust. In 2006 the Trust acquired NHS Foundation Trust status and become the Tavistock and Portman NHS Foundation Trust. It is an active member of UCL Partners, the Academic Health Service Centre located in North London.

Paul Burstow, a former Minister of State for Care and Support in the Cameron-Clegg coalition government, became Chair of the Trust in November 2015.

=== Services ===
The Trust provides clinical services for children and families, young people and adults. It also provides multi-disciplinary training and education. These programmes include core professional training, for example in psychiatry, psychology, social work and advanced psychotherapy training, as well as applied programmes for anyone working in the mental health or social care workforce.

Since 2010, the clinical work of the Trust has diversified, with new services, such as the Family Drug and Alcohol Court in Milton Keynes, and the City and Hackney community psychotherapy service.

It is the largest provider of transgender healthcare services in England, but funding for the service has not kept pace with demand. In August 2019, 5,717 people were on the waiting list for a first appointment, and the average waiting time was about two years. The Gender Identity Development Service (GIDS) at the Tavistock Centre came under scrutiny due to reports that concerns over children's welfare were "shut down"; the Tavistock and Portman NHS Trust defended their practices.

In July 2022, following criticism in the interim report by Hilary Cass, it was announced that this service would be discontinued and replaced with regional clinics providing a more "holistic" approach. It was set to close at the end of March 2024 but, as of 2026, the clinic is still open.

In August of 2022, The Times reported that the Tavistock Clinic was to be sued by 1000 families. No such action has begun.

In February 2023, BBC journalist Hannah Barnes's book, Time to Think: The Inside Story of the Collapse of the Tavistock's Gender Service for Children was published; Barnes said she "wanted to write a definitive record of what happened [at GIDS] because there needs to be one."

In early 2026, Yorkshire Bylines reported on a Freedom of Information request to the trust that cast doubt on the basis for the media furore and the scale of complaints to and legal cases against the clinic that had previously been reported.

=== Performance ===
The Tavistock was named by the Health Service Journal as one of the top hundred NHS trusts to work for in 2015. At that time, it had 449 full-time equivalent staff, and a sickness absence rate of 0.92%. 84% of staff recommend it as a place for treatment and 73% recommended it as a place to work.

The Trust borrowed £58 million in 2016, which it intends to repay by selling its current sites.

=== Discrimination claim ===
The Tavistock has been accused of forcing racist ideology on students, with lectures such as "Whiteness - A Problem of Our Time", and in 2022 a claim against the Trust for discrimination on the basis of race and religion was commenced.

== Notable contributors to the clinic ==
Over the years many hundreds of staff members, at all levels, have contributed to the work of this institution. This list is merely representative of some of the lasting contributors to the different fields encompassed by the Clinic.

- Mary Ainsworth
- Anne Alvarez
- Robin Anderson
- Laverne Antrobus
- David Armstrong
- Enid Balint
- Michael Balint
- Edward Armstrong Bennet
- Esther Bick
- Wilfred Bion
- Mary Boston
- Stanford (Sandy) Bourne
- John Bowlby
- Harold Bridger
- Inge Britt-Krause
- Ron Britton
- Agnes Bryan
- John Byng-Hall
- Irene Caspari
- Andrew Cooper
- Dilys Dawes
- Domenico Di Ceglie
- Henry Dicks
- Ros Draper
- Caroline Garland
- Robert H. Gosling
- J. A. Hadfield
- Martha Harris
- Rob Hale
- Martha Harris
- Clare Huffington
- Dugmore Hunter
- Joan Hutton
- Elizabeth (Betty) Irvine
- Rachel James
- Sebastian Kraemer
- R. D. Laing
- Emanuel Lewis
- Frank Lowe
- David Malan
- Donald Meltzer
- Isabel Menzies Lyth
- Emanuel Miller
- Eric Miller
- Dr William Moodie
- Dr Anton Obholzer
- Renos Papadopoulos
- Sylvia Payne
- Lily Pincus
- John Rawlings Rees
- A. K. Rice
- John Rickman
- James Robertson - who made the film 'A Two-Year-Old Goes to Hospital'
- Phil Richardson
- Felicitas Rost
- Margaret Rustin
- John Steiner
- Rob Senior
- Valerie Sinason
- Jon Stokes
- Phil Stokoe
- Dr Jo Stubley
- J. D. Sutherland
- Ian Dishart Suttie
- Ailsa Swarbrick
- Neville Symington
- David Taylor
- Eric Trist
- Wilfred Trotter
- Judith Trowell
- Pierre Turquet
- Frances Tustin
- Margot Waddell
- Rosemary Whiffen
- Arthur Hyatt Williams
- Gianna Williams
- Isca Wittenburg

=== Medical directors, chief executives and Chair of Trust ===
- Hugh Crichton-Miller 1920–1933
- John Rawlings Rees 1933–1947
- J. D. Sutherland 1947–1968
- Robert H. Gosling 1968–1985
- Anton Obholzer 1985–2002
- Nick Temple 2002–2015
- Paul Burstow 2015–2022
- Matthew Patrick 2008–2013
- Paul Jenkins 2015–2022
- Michael Holland 2022 -

== The Scottish Institute of Human Relations ==
In line with Hugh Crichton-Miller's original vision for clinics to be set up in communities across the country, his dream was not realised in his 'native' Scotland for another 50 years. However, with Jock Sutherland's return to Edinburgh in 1968, he became the catalyst for the formation of an organisation modelled on the London centre, albeit on a smaller scale. The Scottish Institute of Human Relations (SIHR), now defunct, was constituted as a charitable educational institution in Edinburgh in the early 1970s. Eventually a branch was opened in Glasgow. The 'MacTavi', as it was sometimes fondly called, worked closely with the National Health Service in Scotland and provided psychoanalytic training and courses for professionals in the health and educational systems and beyond. It also guided adults and children into treatment for the forty years of its operation. SIHR was finally dissolved in 2013 and its centres closed down. Some of its functions were taken over by a number of other organisations, specifically psychoanalytic training has become the remit of the Scottish Association for Psychoanalytic Psychotherapy (SAPP).

== See also ==
- British Psychotherapy Foundation
- Child Guidance
- Educational psychology
- Havelock Ellis
- Sigmund Freud
- Family therapy
- Group psychotherapy
- Healthcare in London
- Margaret Lowenfeld
- Mental health in the United Kingdom
- Organizational theory
- Psychoanalysis
- Psychoanalytic infant observation
- Psychotherapy
- Socio-analysis
- Winifred Rushforth
