= Scottish Institute of Human Relations =

Psychoanalytic training organization, 1972-2014

The Scottish Institute of Human Relations (SIHR) was an organisation founded in Edinburgh, Scotland, in 1972, to promote a broader understanding of mental health and training in Talking therapies. Its origins go back to the practice of Dr W.R.D. Fairbairn, the Scottish psychoanalyst, and the return to Scotland in 1968 of Dr J. D. Sutherland, one-time medical director of the Tavistock Clinic in London. Other founding contributors included T. Drummond Hunter, a senior NHS administrator, the educationalist Alan Harrow, the philanthropist Sheila Oppenheim, the Kirk minister and son-in-law of Lord Reith, Murray Leishman, and the psychiatrist, Dr J. Douglas Haldane.

The Institute ran conferences and courses, modelled on the multidisciplinary and psychoanalytic thinking of its sister organisation in London. It was, however, entirely independent with the benefit of having connections to members of the University of Edinburgh, government and enterprises in Scotland and its own independent educational and judicial systems. In the 1990s it opened an office in Glasgow to broaden its reach in Scotland. It ran successfully for 40 years.

Due to insolvency, it was obliged to wind up in 2012 and was finally dissolved in 2014.
