= Lily Pincus =

German-British social worker (1898–1981)

- Born: 13 March 1898 Karlovy Vary, Bohemia, Austria-Hungary
- Died: 22 October 1981 (aged 83) London, England
- Occupation: Social worker, author, co-founder of the Family Discussion Bureau
- Citizenship: British
- Subject: Marriage, bereavement

Lily Pincus (née Lazarus, 13 March 1898 – 22 October 1981) was a German-British social worker, marital psychotherapist and author. She was a co-founder of the Family Discussion Bureau, which is now part of the Tavistock and Portman NHS Foundation Trust, and became a leading writer on marital stability and bereavement.

== Early life ==
Pincus was born in 1898 in Karlovy Vary to a Jewish family. Her parents were Julius Jakob Lazarus and Ida Lazarus (née Weinfeld), and they had an arranged marriage in the 1890s. She had two brothers, Oskar and Max, and in 1903, her family moved to Berlin. From 1914 to the summer of 1916 she trained in scientific photography at the Lottehaus Museum in Wetzlar.

== Marriage ==
In 1918 she met Fritz Pincus. They married on 1 June 1922 and moved to Glienicke, on the outskirts of Potsdam, in May 1925 with their friends Günther and Claire Loewenfeld. Pincus worked as a secretary and radiographer. Due to the lack of equipment to protect from radiation, Pincus became unable to conceive.

== Life and career in Britain ==
On 2 February 1939, Pincus and her husband fled from Nazi Germany to Britain, settling in Harlech, Gwynedd, Wales. Her brothers and their families managed to escape and joined her in Harlech. In Wales, Pincus and her husband befriended the Welsh civil servant Thomas Jones. He offered them employment at Coleg Harlech, the adult educational institution that he had founded in 1927. In her later autobiography, she reflected on the soothing effect of the local scenery on refugees, the friendly and welcoming atmosphere in Harlech, daily life in a Welsh mining community and Welsh nationalism. After World War II ended, Pincas and her husband became British citizens.

In April 1943, Pincus and her husband moved to London. Despite having no formal social work training, Pincus was employed in Fulham as a social worker by the Charity Organisation Society, whilst her husband found work at the BBC. Pincus was described at this early stage of her social work career as "a quite exceptional, unobtrusive, but wise caseworker" with a talent for "glimpsing the human behind the hostile fact," by Enid Balint, who was then the manager of London's inner city Citizens Advice Bureau.

In 1946, Pincus, Balint and Alison Lyons founded the Family Discussion Bureau (later renamed the Tavistock Marital Studies Institute and now known as Tavistock Relationships within the Tavistock and Portman NHS Foundation Trust). Pincus directed the Bureau until 1965, and continued working there until 1973. Pincus is credited with bringing a "social work ethos" to the institution. Pincus and her Tavistock colleagues developed the idea of "conjoint therapy," where two caseworkers were assigned to a married couple, and developed understandings of shared phantasies. They were part of the British post-war trend of treating marital stability as dependent upon the spouses’ psychological maturity and establishing equal-but-different gender roles between husband and wife. Pincus felt that in contrast to traditional societies with differentiated roles for the sexes within marriage, modern British couples were navigating the development of their masculinity and femininity without clear societal standards and were therefore experiencing sexual problems and marital failure. She also argued that when a couple had a child and the previously two person relationship changed dynamic, if the father could not allow a third person into the relationship they would be unable to care freely for the infant or provide support for the mother.

Pincus edited Marriage Studies in Emotional Conflict and Growth in 1960. Alongside her work on marriage, Pincus also advocated for intimacy with death and the dying, becoming a leading writer on bereavement and the importance of mourning. She wrote about the significance of the loss of a parent in childhood, discussing how for children "the loss of a parent rouses the need to progress, to mature, to be potent." Her husband suffered from lung cancer for many years before he died in 1963, and Pincus also drew on her personal experiences of his ill health and death in her writing. She was critical of old people's residential homes where there was lack of understanding and appreciation of each old person's individuality.

While living in England, Pincus converted to the Anglican Church of England.

== Publications ==
Pincus published several books on the topics of marriage, family and bereavement, including The Marital Relationship as a Focus for Casework (1971), Death and the Family: The Importance of Mourning (1976), Secrets in the Family (1978, co-authored with Consultant Psychiatrist Christopher Dare), Life and Death (1978) and The Challenge of a Long Life (1981, with contributions by Aleda Erskine).

Shortly before her death, Pincus published her autobiography: Verloren – gewonnen: Mein Weg von Berlin nach London (1980, in German). Pincus' last writings were posthumously published in the journal Bereavement Care in 1984.

== Death ==
She died in 1981 in London.

== Legacy ==
James V. Fisher drew upon Pincus' publications and work at Tavistock in The Uninvited Guest: Emerging from Narcissism towards Marriage (1999).
