= John Derg Sutherland =

Scottish psychiatrist (1905–1991)

John Derg Sutherland CBE FRSE (23 April 1905 – 14 June 1991), also known as Jock Sutherland, was a Scottish physician, psychoanalyst and theorist, notable also for his role as Medical Director of the Tavistock Clinic.

== Life and career ==
John "Jock" Derg Sutherland was born in Edinburgh on 23 April 1905, the sixth of eight children. He studied medicine at the University of Edinburgh and the University of Glasgow.

As a psychiatrist in Edinburgh, Sutherland undertook a training analysis with Ronald Fairbairn. In 1935, aged 30, he was elected a Fellow of the Royal Society of Edinburgh. His proposers were James Drever, Sir Godfrey Thomson, W. R. D. Fairbairn and Francis Albert Eley Crew.

At the onset of World War II he moved to a psychiatric unit in Glasgow, expecting a wave of mentally scarred soldiers. In 1941 he briefly joined the Royal Army Medical Corps.

In 1942 he moved to London to work at the Tavistock Clinic, serving as its Director from 1947 to 1968. From 1968 to 1974 he worked at the Royal Edinburgh Hospital, contributing psychodynamic principles to the general psychiatric training.

He published a number of articles on psychoanalytic subjects, from object relations theory to group therapy, both singly and co-authored; as well as having an extensive private practice.

Among the colleagues he worked with, and whose careers he fostered, were Harry Guntrip, Charles Rycroft and R. D. Laing.

His work in the United States played a significant part in opening up ego psychology to the object relations tradition.

After his return to Edinburgh in 1968, he was instrumental in the formation in 1972 of the Scottish Institute of Human Relations, SIHR, which became a sister 'outpost' north of the border, of the Tavistock Clinic, London, and was sometimes referred to as the 'MacTavi'. The Scottish Institute had offices in Edinburgh and Glasgow and was finally dissolved in 2013 after over forty years of operation as a professional body.

Sutherland died in Edinburgh on 14 June 1991.

== Publications ==
- Fairbairn's Journey into the Interior (1989)
- The Autonomous Self (1994)

Sutherland's biography of John Buchan examines the theme of autonomy and compliance as explored in Buchan's writings.

== See also ==
- Kingsley Hall
- Object relations theory
- Menninger Foundation
- Philadelphia Association
- Sick Heart River
