= Tavistock Relationships =

Operating unit of the Tavistock Institute

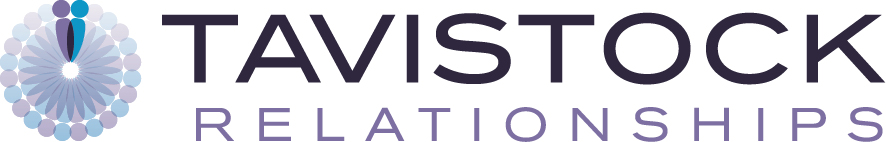
Tavistock Relationships

Tavistock Relationships is an operating unit of The Tavistock Institute of Medical Psychology.

The founding body in 1920 of the Tavistock Clinic. It is a registered charity and company that is limited by guarantee.

== Tavistock Relationships ==
Founded in 1948 as the Family Discussion Bureau by Enid Balint, Lily Pincus and Alison Lyons, Tavistock Relationships aims to improve the quality of adult couple relationships, prevent family breakdown and enhance the lives of children. It is an operating unit of the Tavistock Institute of Medical Psychology. It is a national organisation, with an international reputation for:

1. supplying specialist therapeutic services to couples and individuals experiencing difficulties in their relationships;
2. providing training and consultancy on delivering, developing, and managing services for couples and families;
3. undertaking research that contributes to the understanding of couple and family relationships and how best they might be improved;
4. developing therapeutic practice, training, and research as interdependent and interlinked activities.

Its working philosophy derives from the knowledge and insights generated by psycho-analytically oriented clinical practice and research. It has grown up in the 'Tavistock' tradition, which embodies this philosophy in the United Kingdom, and shares close working links with the Tavistock Clinic.

In January 2005 it took over responsibility for supplying training and clinical services formerly provided by London Marriage Guidance. It is registered as a training organisation by the United Kingdom Council for Psychotherapy, the British Psychoanalytic Council, and the British Association for Counselling and Psychotherapy. For funding it depends upon strategic grants from the Department for Education and Skills, fees charged for services, project grants, and charitable donations.

From June 2016 the Tavistock Centre for Couple Relationships, also known as TCCR, was officially renamed Tavistock Relationships.

== Organisation ==
Tavistock Relationships currently has an establishment of 50 staff. Around 70 additional colleagues assist the Centre in providing services as visiting lecturers, clinicians, researchers and consultants, either on a paid or unpaid basis. Its annual turnover is in excess of £4 million.

== See also ==
- Relationship counseling
- Relationship education
- Loving kindness
- Marriage
