= Balint Society =

British medical organization

The Balint Society, founded in the UK in 1969, is a supportive and collaborative medical organization of clinicians and teachers who emphasize the importance of the use of emotion and personal understanding in the doctor's work and the therapeutic potential of the doctor-patient relationship. The society was created to continue the efforts of Enid and Michael Balint, who set up a school in the 1950s to educate other doctors about the patient-doctor relationship.

The society's international affiliates are registered with the International Balint Federation.

== Balint groups ==
A Balint group is a group of clinicians who meet regularly and present cases to each other to discuss. The aim is a group process of exploration and for the medical participants to transform uncertainty and difficulty in the doctor-patient relationship into a greater understanding and meaning that nurtures a more therapeutic alliance between clinician and patient.

== See also ==
- Compassion fatigue
- Burnout (psychology)
- Enid Balint
- Michael Balint
