= John Rickman (psychoanalyst) =

British psychiatrist & psychoanalyst

- Born: 10 April 1891; Dorking, UK
- Died: 1 July 1951 (aged 60)
- Scientific career
- Fields: Clinical Psychoanalysis
- Institutions: Tavistock
- Notable students: W.R. Bion

John Rickman (10 April 1891 – 1 July 1951) was an English psychoanalyst.

== Biography ==
=== Early life ===
John Rickman was the only child in an extended Quaker family and was throughout his life a practising Quaker. His father ran an ironmonger's shop in Dorking and died of tuberculosis when John was 2. His mother never remarried, and the main male influences in his early life were his grandfathers. John's maternal grandfather was often unkind to him, something he recalled years later when in analysis with Sándor Ferenczi. He was at Leighton Park, the Quaker school near Reading, along with two other leading members of the British Psychoanalytical Society, Helton Godwin Baynes and Lionel Penrose. Rickman later studied Natural Sciences at King's College, Cambridge, followed by Medicine at St Thomas' Hospital in London.

=== First World War ===
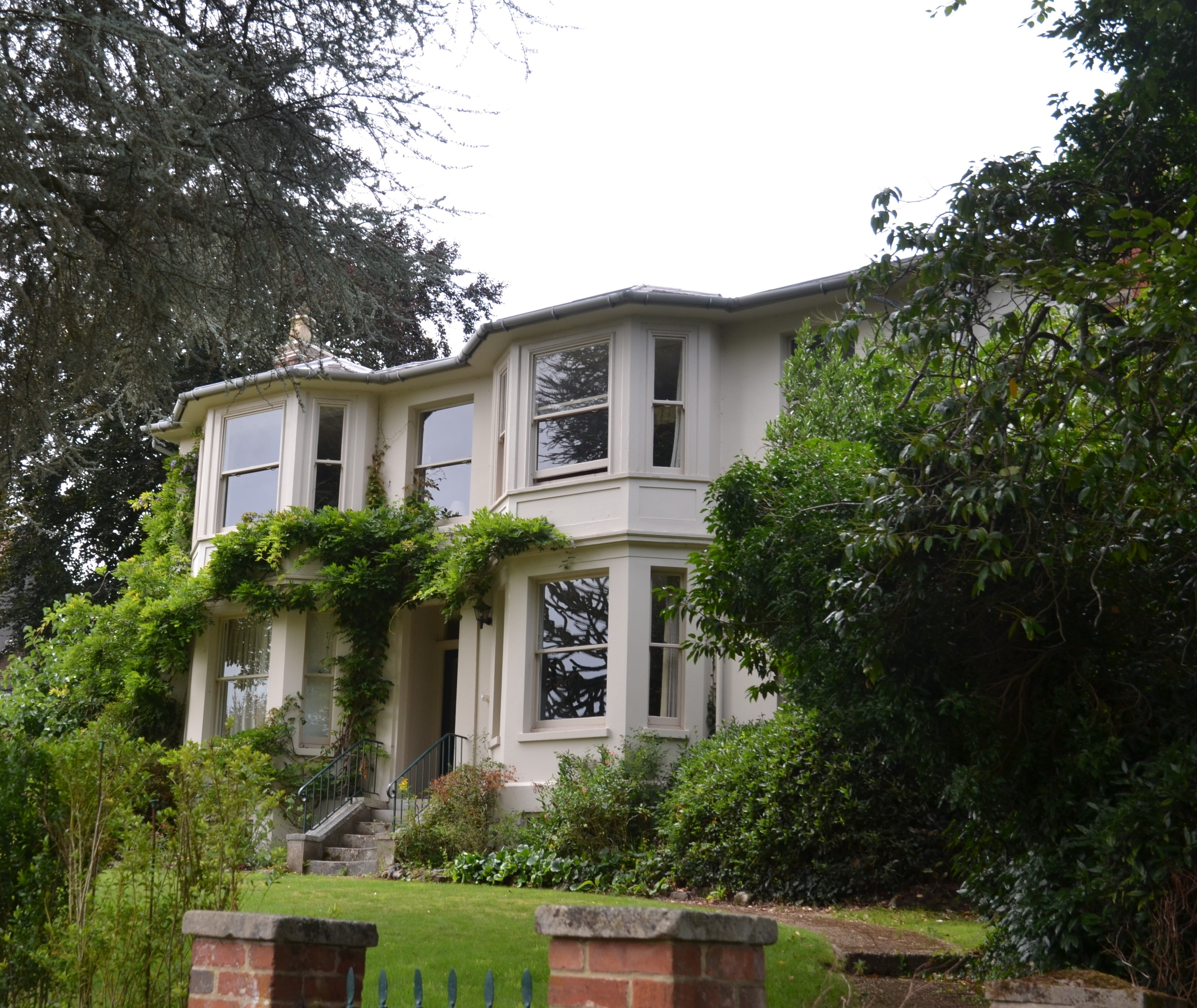
22 Rose Hill, Dorking, Rickman's home in 1916.

When the First World War broke out, John continued his training and faced with conscription, became a conscientious objector and refused to join up. In 1916 Rickman joined 'the Friends' War Victims Relief Service' in the Samara Oblast province of South Russia, where there was great poverty and deprivation, and the Czar still ruled. There he taught peasant women how to nurse typhoid patients during an epidemic and made anthropological observations of the severe limitations of village life. In 1917 Rickman met an American social worker Lydia Cooper Lewis, who had just joined the Relief Service unit. John and Lydia married in Buzuluk on 20 March 1918, after the revolution, and then set off on a dramatic and dangerous escape from the horrors of Civil War, arriving at Vladivostok after more than three months on a very slow trans-Siberian railway journey, frequently stopped and searched by rival agents of the civil war. Once home, Rickman worked as a medical officer with psychiatric patients at Fulbourn Hospital in Cambridge. In Cambridge he met W. H. R. Rivers, an anthropologist and physician who had treated soldiers traumatized by the war at Craiglockhart Hospital in Edinburgh. Rivers advised Rickman to seek an analysis with Freud.

=== Between the wars ===
In 1919 Rickman went to Vienna to have analysis with Freud. He made many contacts there, including Karl Abraham (1877–1925) and Sándor Ferenczi (1873–1933). He continued with Freud until 1922, when he qualified as a psychoanalyst. In 1928 he travelled to Budapest to have treatment from Ferenczi. In 1934 Rickman began an analysis with Melanie Klein that was to continue, intermittently, until 1941 and again for some sessions after the war. In 1938, Wilfred Bion, who had been working as a psychotherapist at the Tavistock Clinic, asked Rickman to be his training psychoanalyst. This was brought to a premature end by the onset of the second world war.

=== Second World War ===
At the beginning of 1940 Rickman was sent to Wharncliffe Hospital near Sheffield, where his work attracted considerable interest and admiration from army psychologists and psychiatrists, including Wilfred Bion, who visited him there. As a result of this reunion Bion drafted what came to be known as the Wharncliffe Memorandum, of which no copy has survived. It contained some of the first ideas on what was to become after the war the therapeutic community movement. Rickman joined the Royal Army Medical Corps (RAMC) and with the rank of major was posted to Northfield Military Hospital near Birmingham in July 1942. Most of the patients there were soldiers who could not manage army life. Rickman's approach was thoughtful, practical and hopeful, not typical of army psychiatrists of the day. Wilfred Bion asked to be transferred to Northfield and arrived in September of the same year. Here he initiated what has since been seen as a revolutionary experiment with groups which, though it lasted only six weeks, led to developments in the understanding and management of groups, not only in mental health but in public services and organisations.

=== After the Second World War ===
Over three decades Rickman played an important part in the foundation and development of the British Psychoanalytical Society, and later, behind the scenes, in building a bridge between it and the Tavistock Clinic. He was the editor of the British Journal of Medical Psychology from 1935 to 1949 and published a great deal (Rickman 1957). Most of his writing after the First World War was infused with psychoanalysis, but his experiences in Russia and Cambridge, and his Quaker commitment to social justice, sexual equality and non-violence, put him ahead of his time. At the end of the war Rickman renewed his involvement in the British Psychoanalytical Society and was elected president from 1947 to 1950.

He died on 1 July 1951, aged only 60.

== Bibliography ==
- King, P., ed. (2003) No Ordinary Psychoanalyst: The Exceptional Contributions of John Rickman. London: Karnac Books.
- Rickman, J. (1957) Selected Contributions to Psycho-Analysis. London: Hogarth Press; reprinted (2003) with a new preface. London: Karnac Books.
