= Enid Balint =

British psychoanalyst and welfare worker

- Enid Balint
- Born: Enid Flora Albu; 1 December 1903; London
- Died: 19 July 1994 (aged 90)

Enid Balint or Enid Flora Balint-Edmonds (1 December 1903 – 19 July 1994) was a British psychoanalyst and welfare worker.

== Life ==
Enid Flora Albu was born on 1 December 1903 in London. Her early education was at Hampstead High School and Cheltenham Ladies College. Albu took a degree in economics at the London School of Economics, graduating in 1925. She had two daughters following her marriage to philology Professor Robert Eicholtz (later Eccles) on the 25 March 1925.

During and after the war, Enid had much to do with the organisation and administration of the Family Welfare Association and Citizens' Advice Bureaux, helping families who lost their homes during the bombing. She had specialised in public administration whilst at university.

With her experience of the dislocations suffered by families during the war, she undertook additional study of psychoanalysis in 1948 under John Rickman. In 1948, she founded the Family Discussion Bureau with Lily Pincus and Alison Lyons (later renamed the Tavistock Marital Studies Institute and now known as Tavistock Relationships within the Tavistock and Portman NHS Foundation Trust), in order to train social workers needed for family counselling. After Rickman's death in 1951, she continued her studies with Donald Winnicott, who became a strong influence on her.

Her marriage to Eicholtz ended in 1952. During this time she started to work with Michael Balint and they married on 2 January 1953. Her new husband was known for his academic study of the doctor-patient relationship. Today it is considered that he and Enid had an equal influence of the scientific understanding of this important relationship. They worked together lectures and attending conferences and together they wrote several books. They developed the idea of treating a married couples who had issues, separately but in parallel, with the husband and the wife having different therapists.

Enid was in charge of the training and research course for general practitioners at the Tavistock Clinic until 1965. In 1968 she gave a lecture which was later published as The Possibilities of Patient-Centered Medicine. Michael Balint died on New Year's Eve in 1970 in Bristol and after his death until 1974 she directed of the British Psychoanalytical Society (now Institute of Psychoanalysis). A volume of her papers, Before I was I: Psychoanalysis and the Imagination, was published in 1993.

She married again in 1976, to Robin H.G. Edmonds CMG MBE retired diplomat and historian, but continued to practise. She died in 1994.

Under her leadership a number of Balint organisations developed in several countries including an International Balint Organisation. The UK Balint Organisation was founded in 1969 to continue the work begun by Michael and Enid Balint in the 1950s.
