= Alice Balint =

Hungarian psychoanalyst

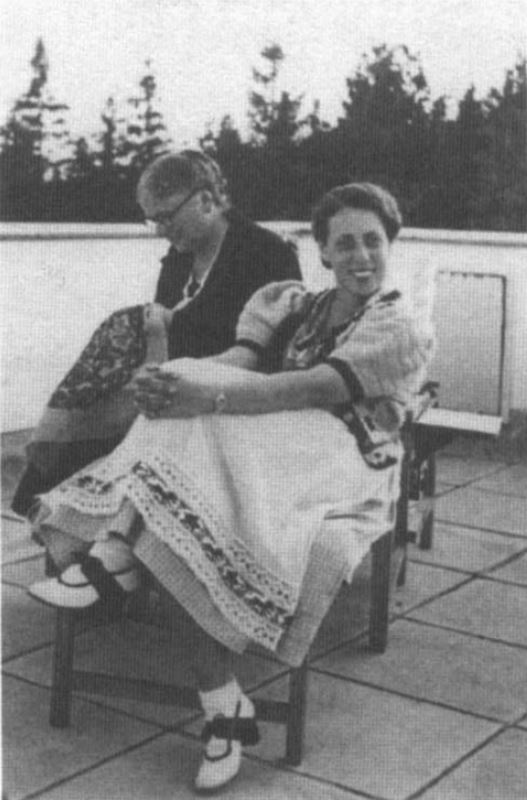
- Alice Bálint in Manchester, England (1939)
- Born: 1898
- Died: 1939 (aged 40–41)
- Spouse: Michael Balint (m. 1920)

Alice Balint (born Alice Székely-Kovács; 1898–1939) was a Hungarian psychoanalyst.

== Early life ==
Balint's mother, Vilma Kovács, had also been a psychoanalyst. Balint was also a childhood friend of Margaret Mahler.

She married Michael Balint, also a psychoanalyst, in 1920. The two soon moved from Hungary to Berlin. However, they returned to Budapest in 1924, and lived at No.12 Mészáros Street, five floors above the Hungarian Psychoanalytical Society's Polyclinic, which opened in 1931.

== Career ==
Balint wrote the book The Psychoanalysis of the Nursery, which was first published in Hungarian in 1931, and later in German, Spanish, French, and English. Balint planned to translate it into English herself, but died before being able to. It was published in English in 1953.

Balint, her husband, and their son moved to Manchester in 1939, as did many other Hungarian psychoanalysts who were anxious about World War II. Balint died later that year of a ruptured aortic aneurysm. She and her husband left behind one son, John A. Balint (1925–2016).
