= Michael Balint =

Hungarian psychoanalyst (1896–1970)

- Born: Mihály Mór Bergsmann; 3 December 1896; Budapest, Austria-Hungary
- Died: 31 December 1970 (aged 77); London, England
- Occupation: Psychoanalyst
- Movement: Object relations theory
- Spouses: Alice Székely-Kovács (died 1939) Enid Flora Eichholz (m. 1958)
- Children: John A. Balint (1925-2016)

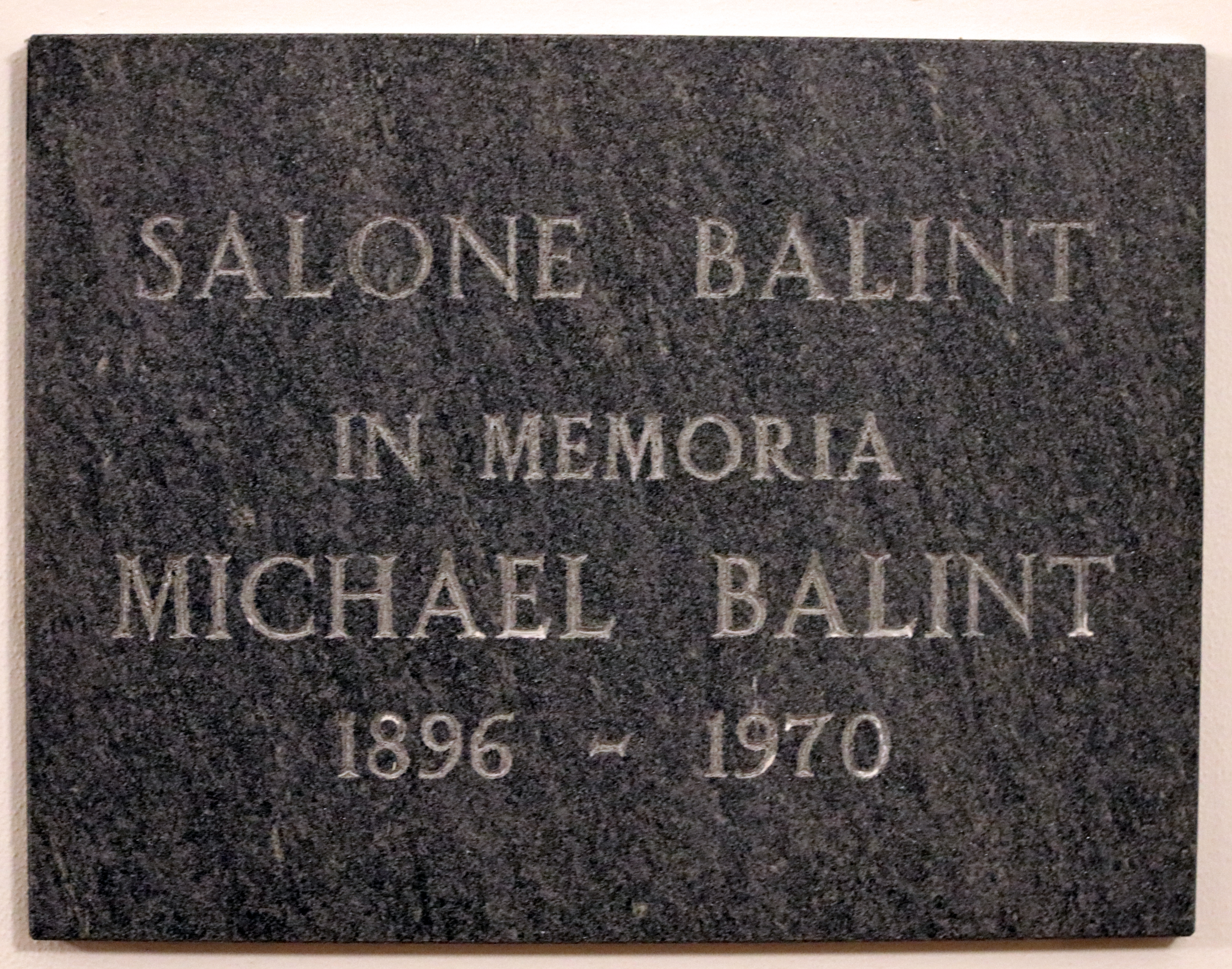
Memorial plaque for Balint at Monte Verità in Ticino, Switzerland

Michael Balint (Hungarian: Mihály Bálint [ˈmihaːj ˈbaːlint]; 3 December 1896 – 31 December 1970) was a Hungarian psychoanalyst who spent most of his adult life in England. He was a proponent of the object relations school.

== Life ==
Balint was born Mihály Mór Bergsmann in Budapest, the son of a practising physician. It was against his father's will that he changed his name to Bálint Mihály. He also changed religion, from Judaism to Unitarian Christianity. During World War I Bálint served at the front, first in Russia, then in the Dolomites. He completed his medical studies in Budapest in 1918. On the recommendation of his future wife, Alice Székely-Kovács, Bálint read Sigmund Freud's "Drei Abhandlungen zur Sexualtheorie" (1905) and "Totem und Tabu". He also began attending the lectures of Sándor Ferenczi, who in 1919 became the world's first university professor of psychoanalysis.

Bálint married Alice Székely-Kovács and in about 1920 the couple moved to Berlin, where Bálint worked in the biochemical laboratory of Otto Heinrich Warburg (1883–1970), who won the Nobel Prize in 1931. His wife worked in a folklore museum. Bálint now worked on his doctorate in biochemistry, while also working half time at the Berlin Institute of psychoanalysis. Both he and his wife Alice in this period were educated in psychoanalysis.

In 1924, the Bálints returned to Budapest, where he soon assumed a leading role in Hungarian psychoanalysis and his son, John, was born. He was employed at the Budapest Psychoanalytical Institute, becoming its director in 1935 after Ferenczi died. Clara Lazar Geroe was one of his students. The political conditions in Hungary made life and psychotherapy very difficult for Jews . John Rickman advised all Jewish analysts to leave and with his assistance Balint emigrated to London settling in Manchester, England, in early 1939, where Bálint became Clinical Director of the Child Guidance Clinic. Here Alice died, leaving Bálint with their son. In 1944 Bálint remarried, but the relationship soon ended, although they were not divorced until 1952. In 1944 his parents, about to be arrested by the Nazis in Hungary, committed suicide. That year Bálint moved from Manchester to London, where he was attached to the Tavistock Clinic and began learning about group work from W.R. Bion; he also obtained the Master of Science degree in psychology.

In 1949 Bálint met Enid Flora Eichholz, who worked in the Tavistock Institute of Human Relations with a group of social workers and psychologists on the idea of investigating marital problems. Michael Balint became the leader of this group and together they developed what is now known as the "Balint group": a group of physicians sharing the problems of general practice, focussing on the responses of the doctors to their patients; the first group of practising physicians was established in 1950. Michael and Enid married in 1958. In 1968 Balint became president of the British Psychoanalytical Society.

The Michael-Balint-Institut für Psychoanalyse, Psychotherapie und analytische Kinder- und Jugendlichen- Psychotherapie in Hamburg is named for him.

== Work ==
=== The three stages ===
Balint 'took an early interest in the mother-infant relationship...a key paper on "Primary Object-Love" dates from 1937'. Thereafter, developing an idea of John Rickman, he argued that 'mental function is quite different, and needs to be described differently, in three-person and two-person relationships, and different in creative activity alone'. Lacan wrote (almost approvingly) that 'Michael Balint has analysed in a thoroughly penetrating way the intricate interaction of theory and technique in the genesis of a new conception of analysis...[using] the catchphrase, borrowed from Rickman, of a "two-body psychology"'. On that basis, Balint thereafter explored the idea of what he called '"the basic fault": this was that there was often the experience in the early two-person relationship that something was wrong or missing, and this carried over into the Oedipal period (age 2–5)'.

By 1968, then, Balint had 'distinguished three levels of experience, each with its particular ways of relating, its own ways of thinking, and its own appropriate therapeutic procedures'.

'Psychoanalysis begins at level 3 – the level at which a person is capable of a three-sided experience...primarily the Oedipal problems between self, mother, and father'. By contrast, 'the area of the Basic Fault is characterised by a very peculiar exclusively two-person relationship'; while a 'third area is characterised by the fact that there are no external objects in it' – level number 1.

'Therapeutic failure is attributed by Balint to the analyst's inability to "click in" to the mute needs of the patient who has descended to the level of the basic fault'; and he maintained that 'the basic fault can only be overcome if the patient is allowed to regress to a state of oral dependence on the analyst...and experience a new beginning'.

=== Focal psychotherapy ===
Along with his wife, Enid Balint, and Paul H. Ornstein, Balint developed a process of brief psychotherapy he termed "focal psychotherapy", in which 'one specific problem presented by the patient is chosen as the focus of interpretation'. The therapy was carefully targeted around that key area to avoid (in part) the risk that 'the focal therapy would have degenerated into long-term psychotherapy or psychoanalysis'. Here as a rule interpretation remained 'entirely on the whole-person adult level...it was the intention to reduce the intensity of the feelings in the therapeutic relationship'.

In accordance with the thinking of other members of 'what is known as the British independent perspective...such as W. R. D. Fairbairn and D. W. Winnicott', great stress was laid upon the creative role of the patient in focal therapy: 'To our minds, an "independent discovery" by the patient has the greatest dynamic power'.

It has been suggested that it was in fact this 'work of Michael Balint and his colleagues which led to time-limited therapies being rediscovered'.

=== Ocnophilia and philobatism ===
Michael Balint introduced two new concepts into psychoanalytic language in his book Thrills and Regression: ocnophilia and philobatism. The two terms refer to two types of orienting oneself toward object relationships, with ocnophilia consisting in stubbornly attaching oneself to objects, and being unwilling to exist in an empty space without such objects, while philobatism refers to the opposite, a state of mind where one is at an absolute distance to objects. Balint writes:

"[...] for the philobat the world is structured by safe distance and sight, and for the ocnophil by physical proximity and touch. In the event of fear or anxiety, the reaction of the ocnophil is to get as near as possible to his object, to squat or sit down, go on all fours, lean towards, or even press his whole body to the protecting object. Parallel with this he turns his face away, even shuts his eyes, trying not to see the danger. The reaction of the philobat is what is generally called the heroic one: turning towards the approaching danger, facing it in order to watch it, keeping away from objects that offer false security, standing upright on his own."

Balint links these two dispositions to the general question of how people relate to situations of danger, specifically that of the thrill, translated as "Angstlust" (the lust of anxiety) into German, although Balint is careful to separate the two in the preface of the German translation. In Balint's mind, people tend to regress into either one of these primitive mental states when faced with anxiety, and therein they express essential attachment experiences.

Ocnophilia literally refers to a philia of clinging into something, and is a compound of οκνέω (oknéo, to cling) and φιλιά (philia), while philobatism combines again φιλιά (philia), with batism, derived from βατείν (bateín) which means to walk. The acrobat (literally the high-walker) would be an exemplary form of someone who is a philobat precisely in the sense that she gives herself over to a form of walking that is adventurous and dangerous, yet distant as well. Balint suggests that the (male) acrobat may be thought of as enacting the primal scene when performing in a highly erect form on the tight rope, before eventually returning to mother earth, and the "beautiful young girl" awaiting him.

== Balint groups ==
'Michael Balint [as] part of the independent tradition in British psychoanalysis, [was] influential in setting up groups (now known as "Balint groups") for medical doctors to discuss psychodynamic factors in relation to patients'. " Instead of repeating futile investigations of increasing complexity and cost, and then telling these people there was nothing wrong with them, Balint taught active search for causes of anxiety and unhappiness, and treatment by remedial education aiming at insight, rather than tablets aiming at suppression of symptoms." Such seminars provided opportunities for GPs 'to discuss with each other and with him aspects of their work with patients for which they had previously felt ill-equipped. Since his death the continuance of this work has been assured by the formation of the Balint Society'.

== Works ==
- Individual Differences of Behaviour in Early Infancy. Dissertation for Master of Science in psychology. London, 1945.
- Primary Love and Psycho-Analytic Technique. 1956.
- The Doctor, His Patient and the Illness. London: Churchill Livingstone, 1957.
  - Dutch translation: De dokter, de patiënt, de ziekte. [vert. [uit het Engels] door S.J.E. Pannekoek-Westenburg] (Aula 192). Utrecht: Het Spectrum, 1965.
  - German translation: Der Arzt, sein Patient und die Krankheit. Stuttgart: Klett, 1966.
- Thrills and Regressions. 1959.
  - German translation: Angstlust und Regression. Stuttgart: Klett-Cotta, 1991.
- The Basic Fault: Therapeutic Aspects of Regression. 1967.
- The Clinical Diary of Sándor Ferenczi. Edited by Judith Dupont. Translated by Michael Balint and Nicola Zarday Jackson. First cloth edition, 1988.

== See also ==
- Balint Society
- Regressus ad uterum

== Sources ==
- Balint, Michael (August 1965). "interview of Dr Michael Balint by Dr. Bluma Swerdloff". Columbia University Psychoanalytic Movement Project: oral history, 1963–1982 (Interview). Interviewed by Bluma Swerdloff. London.
- Elder, Andrew; Gosling, Robert; Stewart, Harold (1996). Michael Balint: Object Relations Pure and Applied. London: Routledge. ISBN 9780415144667.
- Osborne, Thomas (1993). "Mobilizing Psychoanalysis: Michael Balint and the General Practitioners". Social Studies of Science. 23 (1): 175–200. doi:10.1177/030631293023001006.
- Sedlak, Franz; Gerber, Gisela (1992). Beziehung als Therapie Therapie als Beziehung. Michael Balints Beitrag zur heilenden Begegnung. Munich: Ernst Reinhardt Verlag. ISBN 3-497-01257-2.
