= A. T. M. Wilson =

British psychiatrist

Alexander Thomson Macbeth Wilson RAMC FRCPsych FBPsS FRSA
- Born: 1906; Avondale, South Lanarkshire
- Died: 14 September 1978 (aged 71–72); Compiègne, France
- Occupation: Chairman of the Tavistock Institute Professor of organisational behaviour at the London Graduate School of Business Studies Adviser at Unilever
- Notable work: Some Aspects of Social Process Transitional Communities and Social Reconnection: A Study of the Civil Resettlement of British Prisoners of War
- Spouse: Mary

Alexander Thomson Macbeth Wilson (also known as 'Tommy') (1906 – 14 September 1978) was a British psychiatrist who was a pioneer of therapeutic communities.

== Early life ==
A. T. M. Wilson was born in Avondale, Lanarkshire, in 1906 to parish council registrar Alexander Wilson and his wife Hannah Thomson Wilson. He studied at the University of Glasgow, graduating BSc in 1929. Wilson became an MD in 1940.

== Inter-war work at the Tavistock Clinic ==
From 1931 to 1934, Wilson was Lecturer in Physiology at the Middlesex Hospital Medical School. He then became Rockefeller Research Fellow and Physician at the Tavistock Clinic.

In 1937, Wilson and Daniel T. Davies (from the Royal Free Hospital) published a paper on gastric conditions suggesting that stress played a key role in the development of peptic ulcers. The now-famous paper went on to conclude that particular personalities were particularly prone to developing gastric conditions.

== World War II work ==
Early in the war, Wilson was briefly appointed Acting Medical Director of the Tavistock Clinic. This was only a short appointment, because in 1941 Wilson joined the Royal Army Medical Corps. His first project involved a study of morale with Thomas Main, and at this time he also studied the sociological and disciplinary structure of the forces and the work of Moreno and Lewin. Wilson also worked with Brigadier Francis Crew at the Directorate of Biological Research, conducting statistical and epidemiological research for the military.

Like almost all of the Tavistock staff, Wilson was involved in creating new methods of selecting personnel for the British Army, helping to develop a scheme of War Office Selection Boards. Following on from this work, Wilson then became a member of the committee on the recruitment and selection of the administrative class of the Civil Service.

By far the most notable work that Wilson engaged in during the war involved the planning and creation of a system to help returning prisoners of war: Civil Resettlement Units. He headed the Crookham Experiment from November 1943 to February 1944, which studied medics repatriated under the Geneva Convention. He then led a pilot unit in Derby called No. 10 Special Reception and Training Unit (SRTU). As a result of these pilot studies, in April 1945 the first Civil Resettlement Unit (CRU) opened at Hatfield House. CRUs were described as "transitional communities" and built upon the therapeutic community ideas of Tavistock colleagues such as Wilfred Bion. In July, the King and Queen visited the unit, resulting in significant media coverage for the programme and Wilson's military colleague Colonel Dick Rendel.

== Post-war work ==
After the war, Wilson was a founding member and influential figure of the Tavistock Institute. He and his Tavistock colleague Eric Trist wrote to propose the creation of a journal in partnership with Kurt Lewin and his group at MIT. The journal Human Relations was founded in 1947. In 1948, Wilson played a key role in directing the Tavistock towards a focus on marriage and marital stress. This culminated in a project for the Family Welfare Association and Citizens Advice Bureaus, focussing on marital problems.

In addition to his work for the Tavistock, from 1949 to 1954, Wilson was honorary secretary of the Royal Society of Medicine. He was also the chairman of the World Health Organization committee on automation and mental health, and a member of the Medical Practitioners Union.

Wilson continued as chairman of the Tavistock management committee until 1958, when he was appointed adviser to Unilever on the use of social science. In 1966, the Ministry of Labour created a committee to consider the problems of management training. Wilson was one of the 16 members. He was awarded the Burnham Medal by the British Institute of Management in 1968.

Wilson left Unilever in 1970, when he became Professor of Organisational Behaviour at the London Graduate School of Business Studies. He retired from his professorship in 1974, though he retained his connection with the university as a fellow.

Wilson died unexpectedly on a working visit to Compiègne, France, in 1978.
