= John Rawlings Rees =

British psychiatrist

John Rawlings Rees CBE FRCP
- Born: 25 June 1890; Leicester, England
- Died: 11 April 1969 (aged 78); London, England
- Occupations: Director of the Tavistock clinic President of the World Federation for Mental Health
- Spouse: Mary Isobel Hemingway (m. 1920)

John Rawlings Rees, CBE, FRCP (25 June 1890 – 11 April 1969) was a British civilian and military psychiatrist.

== Early life ==
Born in Leicester to the Methodist minister Reverend Montgomery Rees and his wife Catharine Millar, John Rawlings Rees experienced frequent relocations during his early life as his father moved from manse to manse. After a period spent at Leeds, most of Rees education took place at Bradford Grammar School. He then attended King's College, Cambridge, where he studied Medicine and Natural Science and played water polo.

Following his degree, Rees worked at the Victoria Park Chest Hospital, studying tuberculosis. Rees was finishing his medical education at the London Hospital when the First World War broke out. He joined the Friends Ambulance Unit in 1914, and later became a medical officer in the Royal Army Medical Corps, where he was awarded the Belgian Knight of the Order of the Crown for his work with Belgian civilians. After being invalided back to London for a time, Rees was placed in charge of a motor ambulance unit in Mesopotamia until 1919, when he demobilised with the rank of captain.

== Inter-War work at the Tavistock Clinic ==
Hugh Crichton-Miller invited Rees to work with him at a private psychiatric nursing home, Bowden House, Harrow on the Hill. Rees married Mary Isobel Hemingway (10 September 1887 – 4 October 1954), the resident medical officer at Bowden House, in 1921. Their marriage occurred shortly after Rees and Crichton-Miller created the Tavistock Square Clinic for Functional Nervous Disorders, a voluntary hospital which opened in 1920. Mary also joined the staff of the Tavistock Clinic. The clinic specialised in the new 'dynamic psychologies' of Sigmund Freud and his followers, and in particular the Object relations theory of Ronald Fairbairn and others. As well as educating others at the clinic, Rees took the DPH in 1920 and MRCP in 1936. Rees was one of the key figures at the original Tavistock Clinic and became its medical director from 1933. He began to make plans to establish an Institute of Medical Psychology, with beds and more opportunities to train people in psychiatric methods, and bought a site in Bloomsbury to build it, but his plans were halted by the outbreak of the Second World War.

== Second World War ==
Rees was appointed consulting psychiatrist to the British Army during the Second World War, and obtained the rank of brigadier. According to Eric Trist, another key member of the original Tavistock group:

In 1941 a group of psychiatrists at the Tavistock Clinic saw that the right questions were asked in Parliament to secure the means to try new measures. As a result they were asked to join the Directorate of Army Psychiatry, and did so as a group.

During the war, Rees oversaw his colleagues' experiments with group psychotherapy, 'therapeutic communities', morale, rehabilitation, and selection tests.

=== Rudolf Hess affair ===
The work which occupied most of Rees time during the war was the case of Rudolf Hess. Together with Henry Dicks, a fellow member of the Tavistock Clinic group, Rees was charged with the care of Hitler's Deputy at the secret prison locations where he was held following his capture after landing in Scotland. Over the four-year period from June 1941 to Hess' appearance at the Nuremberg trial, Rees apparently established a relationship with Hess: Hess' diaries record many meetings with Rees, referred to at this time as Colonel Rees, in which Hess accused his captors of attempting to poison, drug, and 'mesmerise' him. In 1945 Rees was a member of the three-man British panel (with Churchill's personal physician Lord Moran, and eminent neurologist Dr George Riddoch) which assessed Hess's capability to stand trial for war crimes.

== End of the war and Operation Phoenix ==
As a result of his war work, Rees was appointed a Commander of the Order of the British Empire in 1946. He received awards including the Thomas Salmon Memorial lectureship of the New York Academy of Medicine in 1944, the William Withering lectureship at the University of Birmingham in 1945, and shared the first new Lasker Award with Brock Chisholm in 1945.

After the war, the Tavistock Clinic underwent considerable changes, in which Rees played a key role. He was a member of a group who referred to themselves as the ‘invisible college’, in reference to the 17th century precursor to the Royal Society. This group orchestrated "Operation Phoenix", making plans for Tavistock to rise from the ashes of war. After the war, this group, including Rees and five others, formed the Interim Planning Committee of the Tavistock Clinic. This committee was chaired by Wilfred Bion, meeting twice a week to formulate a new way forward for their work at Tavistock, based on war-time experience. Rees’ plans for the Institute of Medical Psychology were never realised; instead, the group went on to found the Tavistock Institute, with funding from the Rockefeller Foundation. Rees left shortly afterwards in 1947.

== President of World Federation for Mental Health ==
After leaving the Tavistock, Rees’ first role was as the chief organiser of the 1948 International Congress for Mental Health, held in London. At this congress, the World Federation for Mental Health was founded, and Rees was elected as the first president. This organisation is now a non-governmental organisation with formal consultative status at the United Nations. There is an annual Rees lecture in memory of Rees' wife, Mary Hemingway Rees, "among the first staff members at the Tavistock Clinic when it was founded in 1920" and "one of the founders of the WFMH" with her husband.

Rees retired from his post in 1962, though he continued to act as a consultant. He died at his London home on 11 April 1969.

== Selected bibliography ==
- The Social Engagement of Social Science: a Tavistock Anthology Vol 1 (1990), E. L. Trist, Free Association Books, ISBN 0-8122-8192-6
- Fifty Years of the Tavistock Clinic, Henry V Dicks (1970), Routledge, ISBN 0-7100-6846-8
- The Shaping of Psychiatry by War (New York: Norton, 1945)
- The Case of Rudolf Hess; A Problem in diagnosis and forensic psychiatry (1948), by John R. Rees, Henry Victor Dicks
- Hess, the Missing Years, 1987, by David Irving, Macmillan Press (many references indexed to Rees) ISBN 0-333-45179-1.
- Rees, Colonel J. R. (October 1940). "Strategic Planning for Mental Health". Ment Health (Lond). 1 (4): 103–106. PMC 5092653. PMID 28908962.
