= Auto-socio-analysis =

Auto-socio-analysis (French: auto-socioanalyse) is a research practice within reflexive sociology in which a researcher applies the analytical instruments of sociology to their own biography, social trajectory, and position within a given social or intellectual field. The term combines auto-analysis (self-analysis) with socio-analysis (sociological analysis), distinguishing the practice from both psychoanalytic self-analysis, which examines an individual's unconscious mental life, and from conventional autobiography, which has been argued to impose a false narrative coherence on a life — the "biographical illusion" described by French sociologist Pierre Bourdieu.

Bourdieu is the figure most closely associated with the concept, having practiced and theorized it across several late-career works; it has since been elaborated by other scholars in the same tradition, notably Gérard Mauger, and taken up in a related but distinct form by the writer Annie Ernaux.

== Origins in Bourdieu's work ==
The aim of a properly sociological self-examination, in this account, is an "objectivation of the objectifying subject" — turning the tools a sociologist ordinarily uses to analyse others back onto their own social position, dispositions, and unconscious assumptions. Bourdieu developed the idea most extensively in the closing chapter of Science of Science and Reflexivity (French original 2001; English translation 2004) and then in a stand-alone book, Esquisse pour une auto-analyse (2004), published in English as Sketch for a Self-Analysis (Polity Press, 2007; University of Chicago Press, 2008), written in the final years of his life as an attempt at a sociological, rather than autobiographical, account of his own scientific trajectory; its opening pages describe the project as an attempt to assemble "elements for an auto-socioanalysis" rather than a memoir. It was, in his own description, "vehemently not an autobiography", but an application of his own concepts and methods to his own life, including his social origins in rural southwestern France, his education, and his position within the French academic field.

Groundwork for the practice appears earlier in An Invitation to Reflexive Sociology (1992), co-written with Loïc Wacquant, which includes a section titled "Sociology as Socioanalysis" arguing that reflexivity should be a standing feature of sociological practice — shaping how research questions and methods are chosen from the outset — rather than an afterthought applied once research is complete.

== Distinction from collective reflexivity ==
Later scholars in this tradition, including Mauger, distinguish an individual researcher's auto-socio-analysis from what was called "collective socio-analysis" (socio-analyse collective), in which a group of researchers subject one another's assumptions and social positions to mutual scrutiny, on the grounds that no one can fully objectify their own point of view unassisted. Mauger's 2022 article situates the practice within this wider programme of reflexive sociology and surveys later scholars who have carried it out, describing debates over how such a reflexive, self-analytical stance should be positioned relative to standard sociological objectivity.

== Applications beyond Bourdieu ==
Auto-socio-analysis has since been treated by other scholars as a transferable method rather than a one-off exercise. A 2020 article by Séverine Kakpo and Claire Lemêtre examined its use as a teaching tool in a sociology course at the University of Nantes, in which first-year students were guided through producing an auto-socio-analysis of their own trajectory as a way of easing their transition into academic sociological work and addressing the unequal cultural preparation different students bring to university study. Grazia Scarfò Ghellab's peer-reviewed article in the open-access journal SociologieS frames the practice specifically as a condition for scientific rigour in sociological research generally, arguing that without a reflexive, self-analytical posture, a researcher's own unexamined historical and social determinants distort their findings from the outset.

== Reception in sociology ==
A 2011 review article by Frédéric Lebaron in the peer-reviewed journal Economy and Society examined Sketch for a Self-Analysis alongside a companion volume, arguing that Bourdieu's scholarly work developed in tandem with his own reflection on both his native social milieu and the academic milieu he later entered, and that self-analysis and (collective) socio-analysis were mutually reinforcing elements of his method. Reviewers of Sketch for a Self-Analysis have similarly described the book as "a case study in reflective socioanalysis" useful for understanding the approach in practice, alongside its value as an account of Bourdieu's life and of mid-twentieth-century French intellectual life more broadly.

== See also ==
- Pierre Bourdieu
- Reflexivity (social theory)
- Habitus (sociology)
- Socio-analysis
- Autoethnography
