= Civil Resettlement Units =

Post-World War II resettlement scheme

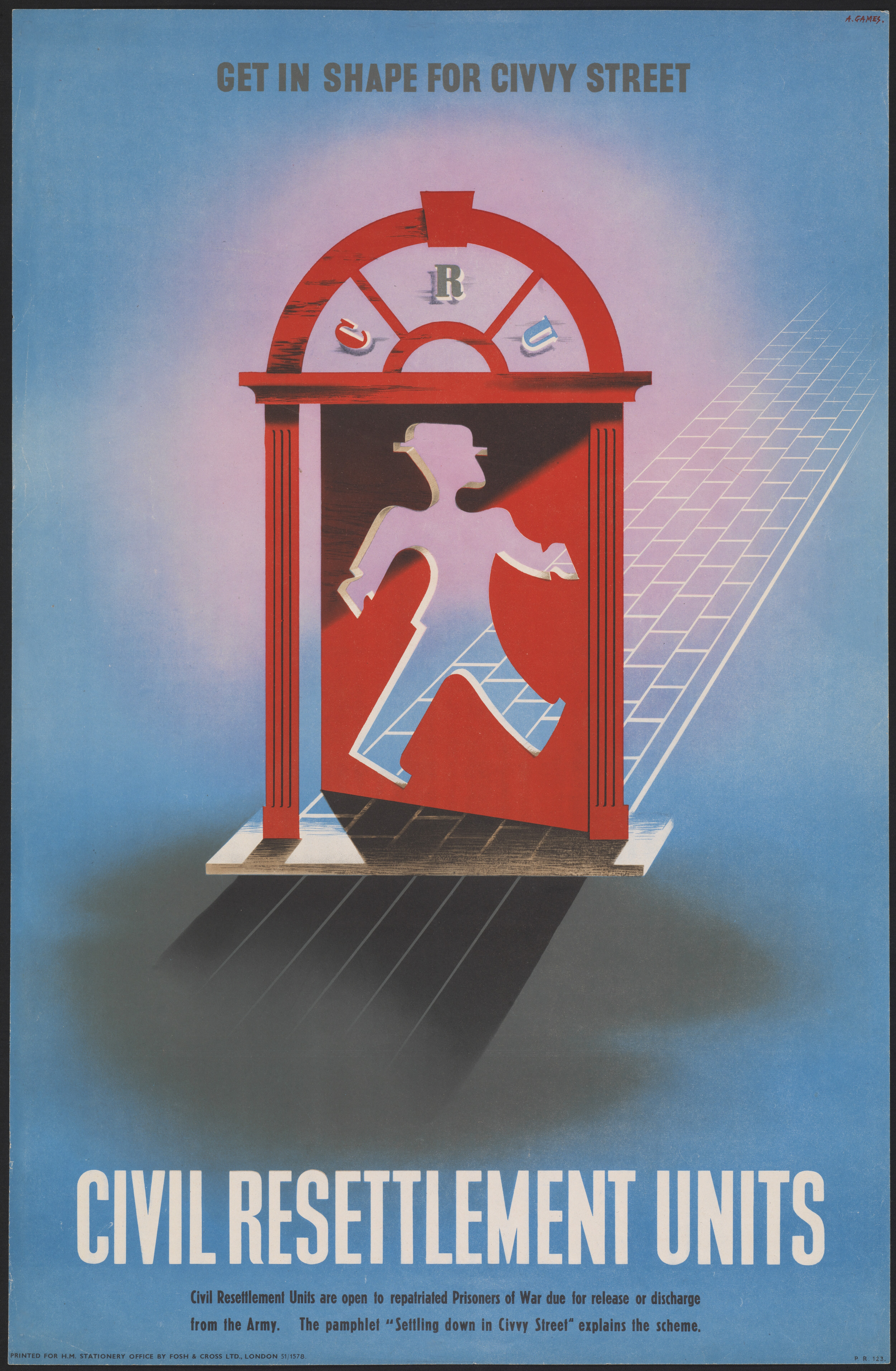
The poster created to advertise CRUs during the Second World War

Civil Resettlement Units (CRUs) was a scheme created during the Second World War by Royal Army Medical Corps psychiatrists to help British Army servicemen who had been prisoners of war (POWs) to return to civilian life, and to help their families and communities to adjust to having them back. Units were set up across Britain from 1945 and later expanded to provide for Far East Prisoners of War (FEPOWs) as well as those who had been captive in European camps. By March 1947, 19,000 European POWs and 4,500 FEPOWs had attended a unit.

== Background ==
During the First World War and shortly afterwards, many psychiatrists including Sigmund Freud assumed that soldiers who had been captured were 'virtually immune' from psychological harm because they were at a safe distance from battle. This was linked with the belief that shell shock might be a way of escaping from danger. Around the time of the Second World War, this view began to change. Psychiatrists and psychologists such as Millais Culpin and Adolf Vischer argued that POWs were at risk of mental harm, and Vischer coined the term "barbed-wire disease" to describe this condition. Psychiatrists had been keen to look into these ideas, and the outbreak of war gave them the opportunity to conduct research. The 1929 Geneva Convention had changed how POWs were dealt with by setting forth rules for prisoner exchange which made it possible for POWs to be returned to their home nations before the end of the war.

In September 1943, Lieutenant General Sir Alexander Hood hosted an Army meeting at the Directorate of Army Psychiatry to discuss the repatriation of POWs, at which it was decided that British Army psychiatrists should investigate what difficulties POWs might experience on their return home, and how these difficulties might be dealt with. As with much British Army psychiatry during the Second World War, work on rehabilitating POWs was headed by a group who called themselves the "Invisible College" and who formed the Tavistock Institute after the war.

=== Northfield Military Hospital ===
POWs experiencing the most apparently severe difficulties on repatriation were treated at military psychiatric hospitals such as Northfield Military Hospital. Psychiatrists Major Whiles and Alfred Torrie noted that patients were often 'markedly resentful of everyone and everything.' Psychiatrists suggested that these feelings could lead to civil unrest after the war if experienced by the significant number of POWs who would be returning.

=== No. 21 WOSB ===
Psychiatrist Major Wilfred Bion and psychologist Lieutenant Colonel Eric Trist conducted work at No. 21 War Office Selection Board (WOSB), Selsdon Court Hotel, Surrey where they attempted to adapt officer selection methods to the purpose of selecting POWs who might be capable of returning to active service. The "officer reception unit" was intended to 'provide them with advice on military retraining and re-employment, and on other problems.' Bion suggested that resettlement should use 'psychiatric machinery; but the machinery need not cause irritation by creaking' and so any programme for handling POWs should appear more military than medical though it should incorporate psychiatric treatment in a subtle manner.

=== The Crookham Experiment ===
At No. 1 RAMC Depot at Boyce Barracks in Crookham, psychiatrist Major A. T. M. "Tommy" Wilson headed an experimental programme to rehabilitate repatriated medical personnel. The experiment ran from November 1943 to February 1944, and involved 1200 POWs undergoing a four-week programme of rehabilitation and training. POW problems included low morale, absenteeism, high levels of sickness, and psychological disturbance. Conclusions from the experiment were published in a memorandum titled The Prisoner of War Comes Home. This document argued that most POWs were not mentally ill but were maladjusted, and required support on their return home.

=== Special Reception and Training Unit ===
In February 1944, the War Office agreed to establish a voluntary scheme to help POWs return to Britain based upon the Army psychiatrists' work. This scheme was announced in the House of Lords in July 1944. In November 1944, a pilot unit called No. 10 Special Reception and Training Unit (SRTU) was set up in Derby. Wilson was selected to head this Unit as opposed to Bion, who expressed his dismay in a letter to fellow psychiatrist John Rickman. Bion believed that the psychological principles underpinning the CRUs, which built on his earlier work at Northfield, were underdeveloped and needed further refinement. However, the first group of POWs were imminently due to return to Britain from Germany, which is likely why Wilson was selected to lead the SRTU.

The SRTU pilot indicated to the Army psychiatrists that some changes were required before a scheme could be created on a larger scale. The "hutted camp" was too similar to a stalag, so more luxurious accommodation should be provided in future, and the proposed six weeks was deemed too long and so cut to four weeks. Lectures were not very popular, but visits to workshops proved unexpectedly popular, so the team built connections with the Ministry of Labour to facilitate work placements and visits. Food was a particular concern of POWs, so table service was provided rather than having men queue.

== Establishment of Civil Resettlement Units ==
In March 1945, the War Office agreed for 20 Civil Resettlement Units to be created. In the spring of 1945, the CRU organisers made frantic preparations for the first large wave of POWs returning from Germany. They secured Hatfield House as CRU Headquarters and No. 1 CRU, and other country houses across Britain were adapted for use as CRUs so that men could attend a Unit close to where they lived.

=== Name ===
The planning team who created the CRUs gave a great deal of thought to what they should be called. Based on the Crookham and No. 21 WOSB investigations, Army psychiatrists emphasised that POWs were very sensitive to accusations or implications that they were mentally "damaged." Based on this the Adjutant General Sir Ronald Adam issued official instructions that:

The word "rehabilitation is frequently taken to connote a process of mental or physical reconditioning made necessary as the prisoner of war is looked on as abnormal or even a "mental case" [thus] the expression "mental rehabilitation" or these words separately shall not be used in conversation or in writing.

One of the participants at the SRTU had also strongly recommended that the planners change the name of the Unit. He stated that 'I would not call it a Special Training Unit to any man... I think the word "training" should be changed.' In the end, the planners decided that 'the expressions "resettlement" or "resettlement training" will be employed instead.'

=== Staff ===
Each unit had a Commanding Officer and Second-in-Command (who were military men), a Medical Officer (usually a psychiatrist, though often this was not acknowledged to the participants attending), Vocational Officer, Ministry of Labour Liaison and a Civil Liaison Officer (a social worker, usually a woman, trained in psychological methods).

A large proportion of the other CRU staff were Auxiliary Territorial Service staff: POWs might not have interacted with women for years, so these women staff were intended to help repatriates become more comfortable in mixed company as well as to facilitate the running of CRUs.

The team at No. 1 CRU, the CRU Headquarters, consisted of Tommy Wilson as the head psychiatrist and Medical Officer, Colonel Richard Meadows Rendel as Commanding Officer, psychologists Eric Trist and Isabel Menzies Lyth, mathematician Harold Bridger, and military officers Ian Dawson and Dick Braund.

=== Programme ===
A "syndicate" of 60 volunteers (in four batches of 15) arrived each week at the CRU. They listened to introductory talks from the Commanding Officer and Medical Officer. After this, the programme was entirely voluntary except for an interview when a participant left the CRU. Participants had the opportunity to attend workshops, visit nearby workplaces or have work-experience placements. They were able to attend group discussions, meet with the Vocational Officer to talk about careers, and meet with the Civil Liaison Officer to talk about social or relationship concerns. Whist drives and dances were held at the CRUs, bringing the local civilian population to the Unit with the intention of helping civilians and repatriated POWs to interact and adjust to one another. Men were not required to wear their military uniforms except for the pay parade when they were given their salaries.

=== Communication and publications about CRUs ===
To inform POWs about the scheme as early as possible, information was distributed through the British Red Cross and the officers of the Supreme Headquarters Allied Expeditionary Force, who had access to POWs whilst they were still in prisoner of war camps.

A leaflet called Settling Down on Civvy Street was issued to POWs after they had been back in Britain for a week or two. This timing was intended to catch their attention when the initial excitement of repatriation had subsided and POWs might begin to experience some frustration or have questions.

Many local or regional newspapers carried stories about local CRUs and the local men participating in the scheme. National newspapers also reported the creation of the CRUs, and on 12 July 1945, the King and Queen visited Hatfield, which generated significant news coverage.

=== POW participation ===
All of those who attended the CRUs were volunteers. Those from the earlier studies were compelled by the Army to attend, but were due for discharge or release on completion of their course.

With the atomic bombings of Hiroshima and Nagasaki, the War Office planned for CRUs to accept only Far East prisoners of war (FEPOWs), based on the assumption that the CRUs would not be able to manage the combined number of POWs from Europe and the Far East and that the FEPOWs were more in need of the service. Wilson and Rendel felt that European POWs should not be denied the opportunity to attend, and went to lengths to expand the programme where possible and make space for both groups. Rendel and Wilson were removed from heading the programme as a result. By the end of March 1947, more than 19,000 European POWs and 4,500 FEPOWs had attended a CRU.

== Validation ==
Major Adam Curle and Eric Trist conducted a study to evaluate the efficacy of CRUs. They found that 26% of POWs who attended a CRU demonstrated "unsettlement" compared with 64% of POWs who did not attend a CRU. Curle and Trist found that the "settled" men studied had better social relationships than a civilian control sample. They argued that this demonstrated the CRU's worth as a therapeutic community. However, they also noted that the results might have been affected by more "settled" men being more likely to attend a CRU in the first place.

Edgar Jones and Simon Wessely have argued that the small sample size and the single location studied limit the validity of the validation study.

== Legacy and related work ==
The principles and some of the methods devised for the CRUs were later adapted and applied to European civilian refugees displaced by war.

CRUs represent one of the first controlled experiments in social psychology. The work conducted at the CRUs contributed to the development of the concept and methods of therapeutic communities. Many of the staff of No. 1 CRU had worked on WOSBs, and their collaborative work on these two schemes resulted in them coming together after the war to establish the Tavistock Institute of Human Relations in 1947.

The archives of the Tavistock Institute, which include extensive materials on the psychological principles behind and creation of the CRUs, have been catalogued and donated to the Wellcome Library where they can be ordered and viewed.

== See also ==
- Demobilisation of the British Armed Forces after the Second World War
- Demob suit
