= Eric Trist =

English scientist (1909–1993)

Eric Lansdown Trist OBE
- Born: 11 September 1909; Dover, Kent, England, UK
- Died: 4 June 1993 (aged 83); Carmel, Monterey County, California, USA
- Education: Pembroke College, Cambridge; Yale University
- Occupations: Social Scientist, Tavistock Institute; Lecturer, University of St Andrews; Professor of Organizational Behavior and Social Ecology, UCLA; Professor of Organizational Behavior and Social Ecology, Wharton School of the University of Pennsylvania; Professor of Organizational Behavior and Social Ecology, York University
- Notable work: The Social Engagement of Social Science: A Tavistock Anthology
- Spouse: Beulah Varney

Eric Lansdown Trist (11 September 1909 – 4 June 1993) was an English scientist and leading figure in the field of organizational development (OD). He was one of the founders of the Tavistock Institute for Social Research in London.

== Biography ==
Trist was born in 1909 in Dover, Kent, England of a Cornish father, Frederick Trist, and a Scottish mother, Alexina Trist nee Middleton. He grew up in Dover experiencing dramatic air raids in World War I, and attended the local county school. He went to Pembroke College, Cambridge, in 1928, where he read English Literature, graduating with first-class honours. Influenced heavily by his don I. A. Richards he became interested in Psychology, Gestalt psychology, and Psychoanalysis, and went on to read psychology under Frederic Bartlett. At that time (1932/3) Trist has said he was very interested in articles by Kurt Lewin. When Kurt Lewin (who was Jewish) left Germany as Adolf Hitler came to power, he travelled to Palestine via the USA, stopping off in England, where Trist briefly met him and showed him around Cambridge.

Trist graduated in Psychology in 1933, with a distinction, and went to Yale University in the USA and again met Lewin, who was at Cornell University and then Iowa. He visited B. F. Skinner, a key figure in Behaviourism in Boston. After witnessing some disturbing experiences during the Depression, he became politically interested for the first time, and read Karl Marx.

Trist returned to the UK in 1935 with his first wife Virginia Traylor (b. 11 Sep 1909, m. 6 Jul 1935 Manhattan, New York) (a granddaughter of John Henry Traylor), her mother and sister. Trist met Oscar Adolph Oeser, who headed the psychology department at the University of St Andrews, Scotland, and went on to study unemployment in Dundee.

At the outbreak of the second world war Trist became a clinical psychologist at the Maudsley Hospital, London, treating war casualties from Dunkirk. He recalls how, in 1940, in the London blitz, "some very frightened people came out of their rooms, ran all over the grounds and we had to go and find them." The Maudsley, at Mill Hill, was a teaching hospital, and Trist attended seminars and met people from the Tavistock Clinic, whom he was keen to join. Opposed by his boss, Sir Aubrey Lewis, who wouldn't let him go, he joined the Tavistock group in the army, as a way of getting free, and was replaced by Hans Eysenck. Trist went to Edinburgh and worked on the War Office Selection Boards (WOSBs), with Jock Sutherland and Wilfred Bion. For the last two years of the war, Trist was chief psychologist at the Headquarters of the Civil Resettlement Units (CRUs) for repatriated prisoners of war, working to schemes devised by Tommy Wilson and Wilfred Bion. He described this as "probably the most exciting single experience of my professional life".

Following the death of his first wife and marriage to Beulah J. Varney (b. 1st quarter 1925, m. 2nd quarter 1959, Middlesex, England), in July 1966 Trist moved to America as Professor of Organizational Behavior and Social Ecology in the Graduate School of Business Administration at UCLA. In 1969 he joined Russell L. Ackoff in the Social Systems Science Program (S-cubed) at the Wharton School, the University of Pennsylvania. He taught there until 1978 when he became an emeritus professor. In that same year he joined the Faculty of Environmental Studies, York University, Toronto where he initiated a program in future studies and taught there until 1983.

In the 1990s Trist wrote a three-volume account of the Tavistock, along with Hugh Murray and Fred Emery, The Social Engagement of Social Science. He died on 4 June 1993 in Carmel, California. By his second wife, Beulah J. Varney, he had one son and one daughter.

== Work ==
=== Influences of Kurt Lewin ===
Trist was heavily influenced by Kurt Lewin, whom he met first 1933 in Cambridge, England. Kurt Lewin had moved from studying behaviour to engineering its change, particularly in relation to racial and religious conflicts, inventing sensitivity training, a technique for making people more aware of the effect they have on others, which some claim as the beginning of political correctness.

This would later influence the direction of much of work at the Tavistock Institute, in the direction of management and, some would say, manipulation, rather than fundamental research into human behaviour and the psyche. It was a partnership between Trist's group at the Tavistock, and Lewin's at MIT that launched the Journal 'Human Relations' just before Lewin's death in 1947.

=== The Tavistock group ===
It was the wartime experiences of Trist and his various associates that created what became known as 'the Tavistock group', which formed a planning committee to meet and plan the future of the Tavistock after the war. The Tavistock Institute was formed, with Trist as deputy chairman, and Tommy Wilson as chairman, with a grant from the Rockefeller Foundation in February 1946, and a new Tavistock Clinic became part of the newly formed National Health Service. Many of the group went into formal Psychoanalytic training.

Trist was much influenced by Melanie Klein, who visited the Tavistock, as well as by his colleagues John Bowlby, Donald Winnicott, Wilfred Bion and Jock Sutherland. Though close to Wilfred Bion during the war, Trist later wrote that he was glad he did not join Bion at this point, because "he left groups in the 1950s – which flummoxed everybody – and got completely absorbed in psychoanalysis", adding, "that was when the cult of Bion – a wrong cult in my view – became established."

Trist and the Tavistock became involved in industrial projects until 1951, and was given the Lewin Award in 1951. The family discussion group was formed, and John Bowlby did his world-famous studies on mother-child separation and the establishment of family systems therapy. With cooperation and contributions from Kurt Lewin in the USA, the publication of Human Relations, the Tavistock Journal began, and Trist commented that this gave the Tavistock credibility in the USA, saying, "its articles wouldn't have been accepted by any of the other British psychological journals".

=== Organizational research ===
In 1949, his organizational research work, studying work crews in at Elsecar Collieries, with Ken Bamforth, resulted in the famous article, "Some Social and Psychological Consequences of the Longwall Method of Coal Getting." This article highlighted aspects of the miners organisation that today would be termed lean or agile.

=== Socio-technical systems ===
Trist also collaborated with Fred Emery on developing the socio-technical systems approach to work design.

== Publications ==
- Trist, E., and Bamforth, W., Some Social and Psychological Consequences of the Long Wall Method of Coal-Getting, ín: Human Relations, Vol. 4, 3-38, 1951.
- Trist, E., and Sofer, C., Exploration in Group Relations, Leicester, Leicester University Press, 1959.
- Emery F. and Trist E., The Causal Texture of Organizational Environments, in: Human Relations, Vol 18 (1) p21-32, 1965.
- Emery F. and Trist E., Toward a Social Ecology, 1972.
- Trist, Eric L. et al., The Social Engagement of Social Science: A Tavistock Anthology : The Socio-Ecological Perspective (Tavistock Anthology), University of Pennsylvania, May 1997. ISBN 0-8122-8194-2

== See also ==
- Isabel Menzies Lyth
- Socio-analysis
