= Isabel Lyth =

Psychoanalyst and social scientist

by Amy Louise Fraher

Isabel Menzies Lyth born Isabel Edgar Punton Menzies (September 12, 1917 – January 13, 2008) was a British psychoanalyst in the Kleinian tradition, known for her work on unconscious mechanisms in institutional settings.

== Life ==
Born and raised in Scotland, her mother was Sarah Curran (born Ness) and her father was the Revd Hugh Menzies. Menzies went to Madras College with a scholarship and she graduated with a double first in economics and experimental psychology at St Andrews in 1939, and became a lecturer there from 1939-45. Thanks to Eric Trist, during the war she became involved with the group around W. R. Bion studying social dynamics in officer training at the War Office Selection Boards and in the relationships of prisoners of war at Civil Resettlement Units. Menzies then moved to London to join them at the Tavistock Institute; qualified as a psychoanalyst in 1954; and underwent a second training analysis with Bion himself.

She married the analyst Oliver Lyth on 23 May 1975, in Hampstead. He died in 1981.

== Theoretical contributions ==
Building on the work on social fantasy systems of Elliott Jaques, Menzies produced in 1959 a classic study of hospital systems as defences against the anxieties raised by caring for people in life and death situations. By establishing a rigid hierarchy, fixed psychological roles and a routinisation of work, the hospital was able to diffuse responsibility and anxiety from the individual nurse to the system as a whole. That benefit came, however, at a cost: the use of the primitive defences of splitting, denial and projection prevented more mature forms of coping with anxiety to emerge, and thus stifled individual growth.

Menzies (Lyth) continued to explore the role of institutions in containing anxiety throughout her life, but conceded that, despite her wide theoretical acclaim, in practice institutional structures remained in large part impervious to psychoanalytic modification.

== Selected writings ==
- ____'The Functioning of Social Systems as a Defence Against Anxiety' Human Relations 13 (1959) 95-121
- ____Containing Anxiety in Institutions: Selected Essays. London: Free Association Books, 1988.
- ____The Dynamics of the Social: Selected Essays. London: Free Association Books, 1989.

== See also ==
- Family nexus
- Group dynamics
- Organizational dynamics
- Socio-analysis
- James Robertson
- Joyce Robertson
