= Socio-analysis =

Socio-analysis is the activity of exploration, consultancy, and action research which combines and synthesises methodologies and theories derived from psychoanalysis, group relations, social systems thinking, organisational behaviour, and social dreaming.

== Socio-analysis and wonder ==
Anxiety, its exploration, and understanding are of central concern to psychoanalysis, which was founded to explore the mental problems of medical patients. While socio-analytic exploration frequently uncovers systemic pain, (of which anxiety is a part), the "pain" is a guide to transformation of the system as a whole with all its potentialities for growth. Joshua Bain has suggested that the emphasis on anxiety is limiting, and that a more appropriate paradigm for socio-analysis is wonder. Wonder was regarded by Plato as the beginning of philosophy, and its link to exploration, creativity, and the growth of capacities of human beings, would seem to make it the appropriate starting point for socio-analysis as well.

== History ==
Socio-analysis has its roots in the first Northfield Experiment carried out by Wilfred Bion and John Rickman, and reported in the Lancet in 1943, and later by Bion in the Bulletin of the Menninger Clinic in 1946. Bion is generally regarded as the father of socio-analysis (although the word was not used in those days).

=== Northfield experiments ===
Northfield Hospital was a military hospital, situated in Birmingham, in the English Midlands, with the task of treating soldiers who had developed psychiatric problems, in order to get them back into the war. Together with John Rickman, Wilfred Bion introduced group meetings as the principal method of change for these patients. This experiment, together with the Second Northfield Experiment associated with the innovations of S. H. Foulkes, Tom Main and Harold Bridger, contributed the following elements to the emerging discipline of socio-analysis:

- Attention to, and making hypotheses, and interpretations, about conscious and unconscious functioning at the level of the group. A group was no longer regarded as simply an aggregate of individuals, but as having its own intrinsic dynamics that required understanding and interpretation.
- The concept of working therapeutically with the "institution as a whole", or the "whole community". The idea of the "therapeutic community" which burgeoned after the Second World War, e.g. at the Menninger Clinic in Kansas, and the Cassel Hospital in London has its origins in Main's work at Northfield.

=== Group relations theory and Tavistock conferences ===
Bion's exploration of group dynamics at the Tavistock Clinic in London after the war culminated in a seminal publication "Experiences in Groups", which describes and analyses three basic assumptions that can be observed in group behaviour at different times: basic assumption dependency, basic assumption fight / flight, and basic assumption pairing. Basic assumptions operate unconsciously within groups at the same time a group may be engaged in a conscious work task – that Bion called a W group.

These insights of Bion together with theories of Kurt Lewin led to the first Group Relations Conference in 1957 that was sponsored by the Tavistock Institute of Human Relations and Leicester University, and directed by Eric Trist.

The "Leicester" Conference as it came to be known under the leadership of A.K. Rice and colleagues such as Pierre Turquet, Eric Miller,

=== Other influences ===
Other influences on the nascent discipline of socio-analysis that emerged from the work of social scientists at the Tavistock Institute in the 1950s were action research; the discovery of socio-technical systems by Eric Trist and Ken Bamforth, its development by Trist and Emery, Rice and Miller; and Elliott Jaques and Isabel Menzies's concept of social systems being structured as a defence against anxiety.

=== Social dreaming ===
A recent methodology for the exploration of social phenomena has been the discovery of social dreaming by Gordon Lawrence at the Tavistock Institute in 1982.

Up until 1996 the work that has been described in this article went under different labels.

=== Organisation dynamics ===
The Australian Institute of Socio-Analysis pioneered a three-year professional training program in socio-analysis in 1999, and began publishing a journal Socioanalysis in 1999. While the Australian Institute of Socio-Analysis no longer exists, the work of socio-analysis continues to be developed by the National Institute of Organisation Dynamics Australia (NIODA). Other organisations which do socio-analytic or closely related work include the William Alanson White Institute in New York, the A.K. Rice Institute (AKRI) in the United States, the Tavistock Institute, Tavistock Clinic, the Grubb Institute and OPUS, all in London, the Centre for Applied Research in Philadelphia, the International Society for the Psychoanalytic Study of Organisations , the University of Wuppertal , and practitioners from many countries who work in the tradition of Wilfred Bion. The journal Socioanalysis is now published by Group Relations Australia.

=== Organisational dreaming ===
Current developments in socio-analysis include Bain's discovery of organisational dreaming, which is based on the observation that dreams are "container sensitive", and that the dreams shared by people within an organisation during a project will reflect organisational realities that are the "unexpressed known" within the organisation.

=== Authority, wonder and the sangha ===
The work of the Centre for Socio-Analysis has also led to a formulation of "authority" that is based in wonder and the sangha (Buddhist notion of "people on the path") in contrast to usual understandings that are based on the individual, anxiety, and hierarchy.

== See also ==
- Socio-technical systems
- Sociotechnical systems theory
- Nazareth-Conferences
