= WOSB =

WOSB may refer to:

- War Office Selection Boards, used by the British Army during World War II
- Woman Owned Small Business, classification by the Small Business Administration
- WOSB (FM), a radio station (91.1 FM) licensed to serve Marion, Ohio, United States
