= War Office Selection Boards =

WW2-era officer selection process in the British Army

War Office Selection Boards, or WOSBs, (pronounced Wosbees) were a scheme devised by British Army psychiatrists during World War II to select potential officers for the British Army. They replaced an earlier method, the Command Interview Board, and were the precursors to today's Army Officer Selection Boards. The WOSBs were also later adapted to civilian purposes such as selecting civil servants and firemen.

== Background ==
Following British defeats and German successes with Blitzkrieg in the early months of World War II, Members of Parliament and the British media expressed concerns with how the British Army was being led. There was a notable shortage of officers, with a shortfall of 25% meaning that the War Office was unable to properly staff units, and there was a high proportion of breakdowns. In addition, the Army was perceived as old-fashioned and inefficient, as well as tainted by social bias.

On a more local level, Assistant Adjutant-General Colonel Frederick Hubert Vinden observed that there was a very high failure rate at Officer Cadet Training Units (OCTUs): he visited each board in 1941, and pinpointed failings in the Command Interview Board as making poor selections of officer candidates and thus causing the failures. Psychiatrist Eric Wittkower of the RAMC had been conducting research on "problem" officers who had broken down or caused disruption, and concluded that these men lacked 'ability or qualities of personality adequate to withstand the stresses of their job.' When Wittkower and Vinden met in a pub after Vinden's visit to the final OCTU on his tour, the result was a discussion about how to improve officer selection by utilising psychological methods. Wittkower had been passed a copy of the selection methods used by the Wehrmacht, and so Vinden and Wittkower met with psychiatrists Thomas Ferguson Rodger, A. T. M. Wilson and Ronald Hargreaves, and the head of Scottish Command, Sir Andrew Thorne, who had been military attaché in Berlin in the 1930s and seen the German methods being used. The group made plans to experiment with and adapt these methods for use by the British Army. Army psychiatry was dominated by psychiatrists from the Tavistock Clinic, and so many figures from that organisation were involved in officer selection from the earliest experiments.

=== Edinburgh experiment ===
In summer 1941, Wittkower and Ferguson Rodger conducted experiments with the German officer selection tests at the Company Commander's School in Edinburgh headed by Alick Buchanan-Smith. The procedure involved:

1. Written self-description by the candidate.
2. Life-history obtained by interview.
3. Group intelligence test.
4. Observation test.
5. Choice-reaction test.
6. Performance-under-stress test.

The observation test was ruled out as not useful, and the choice-reaction test and performance-under-stress tests gave only low positive correlation with the psychiatrists' assessments of candidates' personalities and so were dismissed.

Though the results of the intelligence tests were not available in time to be used to assess the candidates, they were assumed to be useful and an advisory committee even suggested that officers should only be chosen from those who scored highly on intelligence tests. Historian Nafsika Thalassis has argued that this reflected the widespread view of the time that intelligence was a national problem that touched upon many areas of life.

The Edinburgh experiment was assessed based on how well the psychiatrists' conclusions about officer candidates matched with commanding officers' assessments. Out of 48 men studied, there was essential agreement in 26 cases, substantial agreement in 12 cases, and essential disagreement in 12.

=== Bowlby & Southern Command ===
Concurrently with the Edinburgh experiment, John Bowlby conducted research with officer candidates at an OCTU in Southern Command, Wiltshire. He used Raven's Progressive Matrices and interviewed candidates and then rated them on the same four-point scale that the OCTU used. His assessments of the candidates matched with those of commanding officers in 34 out of 36 cases and were deemed a success at picking out capable officers.

A memorandum was drawn up in late 1941 to report the results of the psychological experiments to the War Office, and specifically to Adjutant-General Sir Ronald Adam, who was responsible for personnel issues in the Army. Adam expressed satisfaction with the methods and encouraged the War Office to approve a new system.

== WOSBs ==
The Army psychiatrists' proposals for officer selection on psychological lines were well-received and an experimental unit, No. 1 War Office Selection Board (WOSB) was established in Edinburgh and opened on 15 February 1942. The first WOSB was based in the Genetics Institute headed by Francis Albert Eley Crew in the King's Buildings of the University of Edinburgh. Colonel J.V. Delahaye DSO was the first WOSB President. Wilfred Bion was the Board Psychiatrist, and Eric Trist the Board Psychologist. The first sergeant-testers were Alex Mitchell and David O'Keefe, and the first Military Testing Officer was Captain W.N. Gray. 10 batches of candidates passed through the experimental WOSB: under the new system, rather than a simple interview candidates went to a large country house and underwent three days of testing incorporating various methods.

In April 1942, the War Office expressed its satisfaction with the scheme and commanded that WOSBs should be created 'throughout Great Britain as fast as possible.' Boards were hosted in country houses, which had the space to accommodate candidates and the tests. WOSBs were later also created overseas. Boards were also created for choosing women officers for the Auxiliary Territorial Service, staffed by women including women psychiatrists. Very little documentation on the women's Boards seems to have survived.

At the peak of the WOSBs, there were 19 psychologists (5 women), 31 officers, nearly 600 non-technical officers (about 50 women) and 700 NCOs (about 200 women) working on selection. Between 1942 and 1945, more than 125,000 candidates passed through the WOSBs in the UK, of whom nearly 60,000 passed. In the Middle East, Italy, and North Africa, around 12,700 candidates attended WOSBs and roughly 5,600 passed.

=== Methods ===
The methods of the WOSBs were intended to select candidates who were capable of managing men and relating well to others, as well as being intelligent and physically and technically capable. To select such candidates, a typical Board took place over a course of 3 days, during which a battery of tests were used. The usual format of the days at Boards was as follows:

1. New candidates introduced to the Board staff and given arm bands (names and ranks were concealed in an effort to limit bias). They were given written tests including questionnaires, psychological pointers, and tests of mental ability.
2. Groups of candidates took part in Command Situations which involved obstacle courses and/or discussions and Leaderless Group Tests.
3. Interviews were conducted and the final conference was held at which Board staff made decisions on candidates. Opportunities were provided for candidates to receive feedback whether or not they had been successful.

==== Mental Ability ====
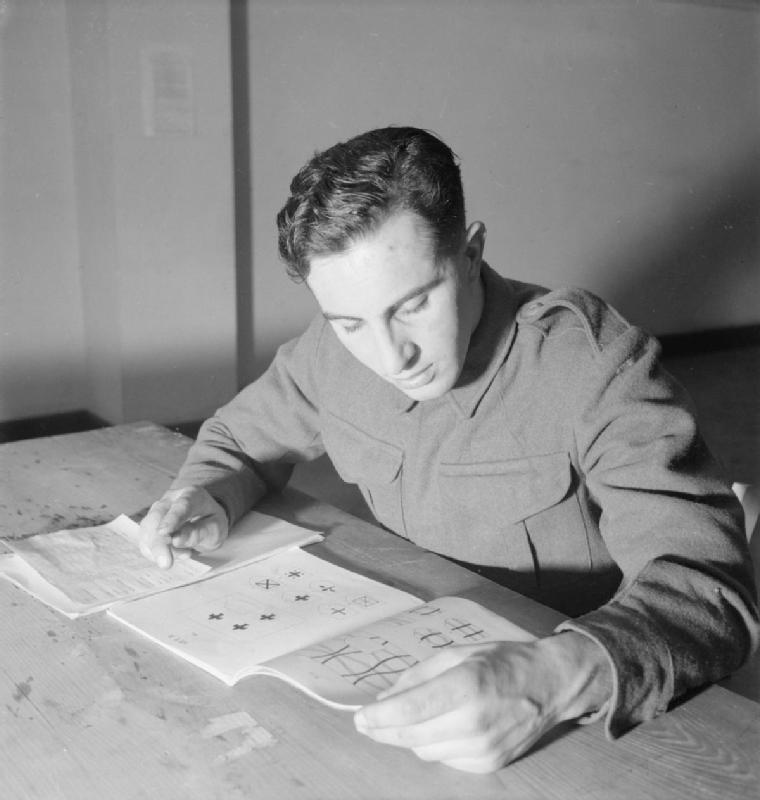
A recruit takes a test as part of his boards.

Though they were often called intelligence tests, advisor John Raven was emphatic that several of the tests used at WOSBs were not intelligence tests but tests of mental ability. Tests included verbal and non-verbal reasoning tests and a version of Raven's Progressive Matrices that was specially created for WOSBs to better distinguish between those at the highest end of the mental ability scale.

==== Psychological Pointers ====
Various "psychological pointers" were used to help highlight areas that the psychological members of the WOSBs may like to follow-up on in later interviews or observations. The pointers were determined by three psychologists: Jock Sutherland, Eric Trist, and Isabel Menzies Lyth. The "pointers" included a self-description, word association, and thematic apperception tests.

==== Command Situations & Leaderless Groups ====
Candidates were expected to demonstrate their ability to relate to others as a leader or in a more ambiguous position via Command Situations and Leaderless Group tests. As the names suggest, in Command Situations, a person was given command of a group whilst they completed an activity or held a discussion and behaviour was observed. In Leaderless Group tests, no leader was appointed to the group, who were then set a task to complete. The task was the "set" problem, but the "real" problem which psychologically trained observers were judging was the participant's ability to balance their desire to do well as an individual with the need to work with and support other members of the group. Leaderless Group tests in particular were credited as changing 'the entire character of the WOSBs' because the innovation made the Boards centres for experimentation and learning.

==== Questionnaires & Interviews ====
Two questionnaires were given to WOSB candidates: Questionniare I covered education, occupation and hobbies and Questionnaire II covered medical family history and so only medical members of the Board were permitted to read Questionnaire II.

The final component of the WOSBs was interviews. The interview method was intended particularly to help the Board to make decisions on borderline candidates who had been highlighted by the preceding tests. There were also two interviews: the Board President and the Board Psychiatrist both interviewed candidates. At some boards, the two interviews led to conflict and jostling for power between the President and the Psychiatrist (see Reception, below).

== Reception ==
The WOSBs seemed popular with the majority of the candidates who went through the system, with questionnaires revealing high satisfaction amongst both successful and unsuccessful candidates. Complaints from those rejected came predominantly from those with a public school background. However, there was hostility to the WOSBs from some senior Army figures such as Bernard Paget and Prime Minister Winston Churchill. Churchill actually appointed an Expert Committee to investigate the work of psychologists and psychiatrists in the services, with the particular intention that they focus upon uses (or misuses) of psychoanalysis.

The psychiatric interview was a point of particular concern. In 1943, the Expert Committee ruled that no more than half of candidates should have psychiatric interviews, and later that no questions about sex or religion should be asked. Psychiatrists at Boards got around this by re-defining a "psychiatric interview", issuing a memorandum that asserted that a "psychiatric interview" was one which dealt with particularly sensitive topics but an interview with a psychiatrist along general lines was simply an interview and therefore unproblematic.

== Validation ==
In numbers, the WOSBs also appeared to have been successful. Between 1943 and 1945 the failure rate at OCTUs fell to only 8% despite an overall decrease in quality of army intakes. A follow-up study indicated that 76% of officers selected by WOSBs were providing completely satisfactory service.

Psychologists Philip Vernon and John Parry (members of the National Institute of Industrial Psychology who worked with the Royal Navy) criticised the WOSBs scheme for technical deficiencies. They argued that as the Board President had the final say, there was variation across WOSBs depending on how far the President accepted psychological methods and guidance.

In 1950, psychiatrist Ben Morris and Chief Psychologist to the War Office Bernard Ungerson, exchanged articles in the journal Occupational Psychology discussing the validity of WOSBs. Ungerson questioned the validity of the WOSBs; Morris published a defence in response to Ungerson, arguing that the WOSBs could not be assessed based on officer quality, as this was affected by training which was completely separate from selection.

== Legacy ==
Some of the methods used at WOSBs (and No. 21 WOSB itself) were used by the Army psychiatrists in early investigations of problems with repatriated prisoners of war.

The WOSBs were a precursor to the Army Officer Selection Board that is in place today. During World War II, WOSBs selection methods were adapted for use by armed forces all over the world, including in India and Canada. WOSBs were also adapted for use as Civil Service Selection Boards (CSSBs), for use by the Office of Strategic Services, Unilever and other commercial enterprises, and for fire services, police forces, etc.

The staff who created the WOSBs found that they had many shared interests. Calling themselves the "Invisible College" (in reference to the Invisible College who were the precursors of the Royal Society), they went on to form the Tavistock Institute of Human Relations after the war.
