= Frederick Hubert Vinden =

British army officer

Frederick Hubert Vinden CIE
- Born: 1895
- Died: 2 February 1977; Paris
- Occupation: British Army Brigadier
- Spouse: Rose Vinden (d. 10 February 2005)
- Children: Anthony John Vinden

Frederick Hubert Vinden (1895 - 2 February 1977) was a Brigadier in the British Army who played a key role in the establishment of new officer selection methods, the War Office Selection Boards. Vinden later had a career in international service. He played a key role in building the Indian Civil Service after the country was declared independent in 1947, and worked for the UN, UNESCO, and the OECD.

== Early life ==
Frederick Vinden was born in 1895 and grew up in Exeter, Devon, England. He was educated at Exeter School and the Sorbonne.

== Military career ==
Vinden's military service began during World War I when he enlisted and served as a junior NCO in the 20th Battalion Royal Fusiliers. He served on the Western front from November 1915, and was later commissioned into the Suffolk Regiment, with whom he served during the Battle of the Somme and the Battle of Arras. Vinden attended the Army Staff College, Camberley, and worked as an instructor at No. 18 Officer Cadet Battalion in Bath.

During the 1920s, Vinden served in Ireland at the Curragh internment camp. He did not enjoy this role as he felt too inexperienced and was frustrated by the number of disturbances. In an effort to prevent escape attempts, Vinden signed a notice warning internees that they were putting their lives at risk, however even a mock shooting staged with a British guard dressed as a prisoner seemed to have little effect at dissuading future attempts.

In the 1930s, Vinden supervised trials which led to British Army use of the Bren Gun. He then became Director of Intelligence in the Far East. In this role, he produced reports on the security of Singapore and Malaya. He said of this work that, "Intelligence is not always an affair of spies looking through keyholes or of seduction by charming ladies with big black eyes."

During World War II, Vinden became Assistant Adjutant General. He was responsible for the provision of officers, and complained of a shortfall so severe that he was unable to provide enough personnel to the Middle East and India. Vinden and Sir Andrew Thorne subsequently worked with psychiatrists including Eric Wittkower and Thomas Ferguson Rodger to adapt German methods for use in selecting officers for the British Army. The scheme created was the War Office Selection Boards (WOSBs). In 1943, Vinden took WOSBs to the Indian Army when he was appointed Director of Selection and Personnel.

== International service career ==
On retiring from the British Army, Vinden served for two years in the Indian Home Department. When independence was declared in 1947, he became Joint Secretary to the Indian Government, where he helped to establish Jawaharlal Nehru's Civil Service.

In the early 1950s, Vinden worked recruiting personnel for the UN Technical Assistance Programme. He followed this role with work for UNESCO and, in the 1960s, work for the OECD. He was actively involved in the selection committee for Voluntary Service Overseas and assisted the National Foundation for Educational Research.

== Personal life ==
Vinden married Rose (died 10 February 2005) and they had a son Anthony John Vinden.
