= James Gooch (psychoanalyst) =

American psychiatrist (1934–2020)

James Allan Gooch
- Born: November 2, 1934; Stanford, Kentucky
- Died: April 4, 2020 (aged 85); Beverly Hills, California United States

Academic background
- Education: Andrews University; Loma Linda University

Academic work
- Discipline: Psychoanalysis
- Institutions: University of Southern California; Reiss-Davis Child Study Center; Psychoanalytic Center of California

James Gooch (2 November 1934 – 4 April 2020) was an American psychiatrist and psychoanalyst influential in promoting the ideas of Melanie Klein, Wilfred Bion (with whom he trained), and the British Object Relations theorists in Southern California in the 1980s and 1990s. He was chair of the Department of Psychoanalysis at the California Graduate Institute, an independent professional school for psychologists, and during 1984-1990 he was founding president of the Psychoanalytic Center of California (PCC), a Kleinian-oriented psychoanalytic institute in Los Angeles. He was also a founding member of The Confederation of Independent Psychoanalytic Societies and served for eight years as the North American Representative to the Board of the IPA International Psychoanalytic Association.

Gooch received his MD from Loma Linda University School of Medicine in 1959 and completed his residency in psychiatry and child psychiatry at Cedars-Sinai Medical Center during 1962-1967. He did postgraduate training in psychoanalysis at the Southern California Psychoanalytic Institute 1962-1970 and received a PhD in psychoanalysis in 1971. He was psychoanalyzed by Wilfred Bion, a major figure in Kleinian psychoanalysis. Gooch then became a major proponent of the fledgling Kleinian movement in Southern California from his position as department chair at the California Graduate Institute. Gooch was a founding member of the Psychoanalytic Center of California and its first president from 1984-1990. He continued his private psychoanalytic practice from his home in Los Angeles until shortly before his death in April 2020.
