= Ronald Hargreaves =

British psychiatrist

Ronald Hargreaves OBE, FRCP, MRCS
- Born: George Ronald Hargreaves; 14 July 1908
- Died: 18 December 1962 (aged 54); National Hospital, Queen Square, London, England
- Occupation: Psychiatrist
- Spouse: Dr Eva G. Byrde (married 1933)
- Children: 4

George Ronald Hargreaves OBE, FRCP, MRCS (14 July 1908 – 18 December 1962) was a civilian and military psychiatrist.

== Early life ==
Hargreaves was born in Yorkshire^{[dubious]} to James Arthur Hargreaves, and was the eldest of four children (a brother was broadcaster Jack Hargreaves). He was educated at Mill Hill School and then studied medicine at University College London, where he was involved in the students' dramatic society. Hargreaves then attended University College Hospital Medical School, where he had the opportunity to become house physician and house surgeon. Hargreaves was unable to take up this appointment because the death of his father^{[dubious]} required him to take paid work to support his younger siblings.

Hargreaves was reluctant to spend time on unnecessary postgraduate training and examinations when he had already secured the first openings in his chosen specialism. Therefore, instead of pursuing Membership of the Royal College of Physicians, he began his career in psychiatry serving at Hill End Hospital in St Albans, whilst simultaneously working as a clinical assistant to Bernard Hart at University College Hospital. He later worked at Cassel Hospital, Penshurst, Kent.

In 1933, Hargreaves married Eva Byrde. Together they had four daughters.

In 1938, Ronald was appointed full physician at the Tavistock Clinic and Eva gained her diploma in anaesthetics.

== War service ==
When World War II broke out, Hargreaves volunteered for the Royal Army Medical Corps to serve as a psychiatrist. Whilst waiting to be called up, he read up on Army history, regulations, structure and training. He paid particular attention to Fortescue's History of the British Army and a book on Army psychiatry written by the American psychiatrist Thomas Salmon at the end of the First World War, and used the expertise gleaned from these works to impress Army personnel who were sceptical about psychiatrists. Nevertheless, he was accepted in the specialism and was commissioned as a medical officer (MO) on 1 April 1940, as a Lieutenant in the RAMC (128236).

Hargreaves began his war-work in Northern Command as the Command Psychiatrist. The posting was a fortunate one, and may not have been entirely coincidental, as the General Officer Commanding (GOC) of Northern Command was Sir Ronald Adam, who was known to be particularly keen to find new, objective and empirical methods for selection and training: Hargreaves could hardly have found a more sympathetic commander, and it would be interesting to examine the interaction between the two and the relation this had on the evolution of new procedures within the command. In any case, Hargreaves and his Tavistock colleagues were themselves very interested in the Army's system of selection, and only a few months after joining up, Hargreaves was experimenting with the use of Raven's Progressive Matrices as a way of screening out unsuitable recruits. His work on psychological methods of selection and allocation helped to bring about the creation of the Directorate for the Selection of Personnel, a General Service Selection scheme (GSS), and War Office Selection Boards (WOSBs).

As well as his work on selection, Hargreaves also participated in work on neuroses. His research into causes of psychoneuroses in soldiers demonstrated that men with no predisposition to psychological breakdown, based on family history and childhood behaviour, were still at risk. He argued that more attention should be paid to the circumstances of the breakdown, rather than purely focussing on background and patient history. He shaped the work conducted at Northfield Military Hospital by encouraging Harold Bridger to follow up on the group therapy work that Wilfred Bion and John Rickman had initiated, and by passing information on the Northfield experiments to Karl Menninger for the Journal of the Menninger Clinic.

In due course, Hargreaves was promoted out of the Command, to take his ideas Army-wide, based at the War Office. In addition, he also liaised with the United States Army and the Canadian Army, whom he advised on the use of psychological staff, when visiting North America in 1943 as Consultant to the Army.

In the course of his military career, Hargreaves was promoted from Lieutenant to Lieutenant-Colonel and, at the end of the war, his contribution to military psychiatry was recognised with the award of a military OBE, in the New Year's Honours of 1946.

== Post-War ==
After his release from the Army, Hargreaves worked for a time at the Tavistock Institute and then as a medical officer at Unilever.

In 1948, he was invited by Brock Chisholm to become the first chief of the mental health section of the new World Health Organization (WHO), a Geneva-based agency of the United Nations, where he was an advocate of the concept of mental hygiene. Hargreaves worked at the WHO from 1948 to 1955, when he retired in order to take up an academic post at home.

In 1955 he was appointed Nuffield Professor of Psychiatry at the University of Leeds, where he was also awarded an honorary MSc in 1957. At Leeds, Hargreaves worked with colleagues such as Max Hamilton, running trials on chlorpromazine. Hamilton and Hargreaves developed a number of scales to measure anxiety, including the HAMA.

Hargreaves was elected MRCP in 1959 and FRCP in 1962. As well as working for the university, Hargreaves served on the Medical Research Council, the Royal Medico-Psychological Association, and the British Medical Association. He also collected flamenco records and had an expert knowledge of flamenco dancing.

Hargreaves' wife Eva died at the beginning of 1962 and Ronald himself also died young, after an operation, on 18 December of the same year.
