= Enid Mumford =

British social scientist and computer scientist

- Born: March 6, 1924; Merseyside, Northwest England
- Died: April 7, 2006 (aged 82)
- Occupations: Social scientist; computer scientist; Professor Emerita; (Manchester University); Visiting Fellow; (Manchester Business School)
- Organizations: Chartered Institute of Personnel and Development; (member); British Computer Society (BCS); (Fellow and later Honorary Fellow)
- Parents: Arthur McFarland (father); Dorothy Evans (mother)
- Awards: American Warnier Prize; Lifetime Achievement Award; (Exceptional Achievement in Information Systems)

Enid Mumford (6 March 1924 – 7 April 2006) was a British social scientist, computer scientist and Professor Emerita of Manchester University and a visiting fellow at Manchester Business School, largely known for her work on human factors and socio-technical systems.

== Biography ==
Enid Mumford was born on Merseyside in North West England, where her father Arthur McFarland was magistrate and her mother Dorothy Evans was teacher. She attended Wallasey high school, and received her BA in Social Science from Liverpool University in 1946.

After graduation Enid Mumford spent time working in industry, first as personnel manager for an aircraft factory and later as production manager for an alarm clock manufacturer. The first job was important for her career as an academic, since it involved looking after personnel policy and industrial relations strategy for a large number of women staff. The second job also proved invaluable, as she was running a production department, providing a level of practical experience that is unusual among academics.

As a newly joined member of Manchester Business School, Enid provides formative advice to students starting on research/engineering projects advising students to choose topics of study that are interesting yet challenging. In addition, Enid mentions that research projects should include research methods such as Large-scale surveys, face-to-face interviews and close observations. Finally, she suggests all students to keep good respectable terms with everyone involved with their research methods.

She was a companion of the Chartered Institute of Personnel and Development, a Fellow of the British Computer Society (BCS), also an Honorary Fellow of the BCS in 1984, and also a founder member and ex-chairperson of the BCS Sociotechnical Group.

In 1983, Enid Mumford was awarded the American Warnier Prize for her contributions to information science. In 1996, she was given an Honorary Doctorate by the University of Jyvaskyla in Finland. And in 1999, she was the only British recipient of a Leo Lifetime Achievement Award for Exceptional Achievement in Information Systems, one of only four in that year. Leo Awards are given by the Association for Information Systems (AIS) and the International Conference on Information Systems (ICIS).

== Work ==
=== Research in industrial relations ===
At the Faculty of Social Science at Liverpool University Mumford carried out research in industrial relations in the Liverpool docks and in the North West coal industry.

The purpose of research is understanding, explanation and prediction. When gathering data from face-to-face interviewing programs, fewer formal methods are shown to be more respectable and often show superior quality of information. Whereas observational research tends to look at the patterns of behaviour and insights into why this behaviour is taking place. This can be hard to apply statics to this data, rather a description of what has taken place and why, will be more beneficial.

=== Human factors and socio-technical systems ===
Early in her career Enid Mumford realised that the implementation of large computer systems generally resulted in failure to produce a satisfactory outcome. Such failure could arise even when the underlying technology was adequate. She demonstrated that the underlying cause was an inability to overcome human factors associated with the implementation and use of computers. Four decades later, despite the identification of these sociotechnical factors and the development of methodologies to overcome such problems, large scale computer implementations are often unsuccessful in practice.

Mumford recognised that user participation of system design is just as important as the technology being introduced. She believed it was important to take into account users' social and technical needs when creating an IS, and that user participation is needed for this to happen. Mumford described participation as the democratic processes that allow staff to have control over the environment they work in and the future of their job.

Enid Mumford specifically emphasized the importance of participative system design. This emphasis has been accepted within the context of IS development. One of the main success factors indicated from this design was the importance of exploitative progression in the post implementation environment. Enid Mumford's theory of the importance of user participation has been widely recognised as effective and beneficial.

Mumford also used Talcott Parsons and Edward Shils’ patterns variables to propose five different contracts that can be used to evaluate employer-employee relationships.

One of the contracts proposed was the work structure contract, which aimed to emphasize the importance of ensuring employees found their jobs both interesting and challenging. To implement this contract, Mumford states the need for the continual questioning of production processes and principles alongside the identification of tools, techniques, and technologies which can be considered efficient and humanistic.

Influencing all five contracts of the employer-employee relationship was the value contract. This contract specifically set out to develop a set of values both employees and management could agree on, simply because the values and interests of employees differ from those of the employers. Mumford described that employees were interested in being economically incentivised in exchange for the services they provide; however, the overall consensus was to produce values such as long-term humanistic profitability, ensuring both company economic success and employee motivation.

=== The socio-technical approach ===
While at MBS, Mumford developed a close relationship with the Tavistock Institute and became interested in their democratic socio-technical approach to work organisation. Since then, she has applied this approach to the design and implementation of computer-based systems and information technology. One of her largest socio-technical projects was with the Digital Equipment Corporation (DEC) in Boston. In the 1970s she became a member of the International Quality of Working Life Group, the goal of which was to spread the socio-technical message around the world. She later became a council member of the Tavistock Institute and was also a member of the US Socio-technical Round Table.

Mumford’s 2000 conference paper titled “Socio-Technical Design: An Unfulfilled Promise or a Future Opportunity?” discussed the origins and evolution of socio-technical design, starting with its beginnings at the Tavistock institute. Mumford outlined the promises and possibilities of socio-technical design that were apparent at the time of its conception. She highlighted the ways that it had moved from success into failure, and evaluated the socio-technical initiatives that had occurred in different nations.

Despite the replacement of socio-technical projects by more efficient systems such as lean production, socio-technical notions remain essential when conceptualizing frameworks involving humans and computers (Mumford, 2000).

Choosing the type of method you are going to use is dependent on a number of factors. Mumford highlights the importance of the question ‘what will be most effective in enabling me to collect the data I need to test my hypothesis and answer my questions?’. The chosen method may be a single technique but is preferably a blend of techniques that will reinforce each other and provide different but complimentary data. Often a mix of methods produces the best results as it not only considers the political issues with research such as differences in opinions between researchers and how the task should be carried out, but also allows the subject to be fully investigated to achieve the most accurate results.

Among Enid Mumford’s accomplishments and spearheading believing is the advancement of a coordinated strategy for frameworks usage named Effective Technical and Human Implementation of Computer Systems (ETHICS) that joins work plan as a feature of the frameworks arranging and execution exertion. This examination addresses why ETHICS at first rose in prominence and afterward declined throughout the long term. To respond to this inquiry, we apply Latour's (1999) five-circle structure to depict the arrangement of science. The discoveries uncover that Mumford held and adjusted numerous heterogeneous entertainers and assets that together added to the forming of ETHICS. As the substance of ETHICS was formed by the interweaving of numerous components, when a portion of these components later changed and subverted their past arrangement, the substance of ETHICS was not reshaped, and subsequently it lost its status and declined. The paper closes by drawing more broad exercises for IS research.

"Future Analysis, it is an attribute of most of today’s computer systems is their flexibility in terms of work organization. To help systems designers, managers and other interested groups take advantage of this flexibility and achieve good organizational as well as good technical design, the author developed the ETHICS method."

Mumford suggests change and that those affected by it should be involved and have an input on the change if it’s to be accepted. This reflects on the ethical views Mumford has as she supports the idea of morality as a natural right. She makes it very clear on how moral responsibility is personal and precious and how no one can take it away from someone. This is relatable to employees as they should be made aware of the changes within their organization.

Enid Mumford developed the information systems research community, her favoured method of research came in the form of action research as this helps to promote cooperative development of systems. This research method is proven by the influential Manchester conference in 1984. This was the first conference to ever question the broadly differing conceptions of what established Information Systems research is.

Enid Mumford’s draws success from the implementation of Socio-Technical Design; an organisational development method that focuses on the relationship between people and technology in the work environment. Its relationship with action research, was highlighted by its evolution in the 1960s and 1970s. Which improved general work practices as well as the relationship between management and workers. With the Global economy being in a recession during the early 1980s, Enid Mumford’s theory of socio-technical design gave way to several cost cutting methods that helped better organisations during this period. By making technology more viable in the workplace environment, enabling them to introduce lean production and suitable downsizing techniques.

=== ETHICS Methodology of Systems Implementation ===
Enid Mumford devised the ETHICS approach to the design and implementation of computer-based information systems. She explains in her work that while others are more intent on improving the ‘bottom line’ of corporations with the use of IT, Enid’s approach was more focused on the everyday workers and IT’s impact on their working lives (Avison et al., 2006).

Her work placed the social context and human activities/needs at the centre of IS design. Findings from projects across the 1960 and 1970s were consolidated by Mumford and her peers to bring rise to system development methodology known as ETHICS (Effective Technical & Human Implementation of Computer-based Systems).

In the progress method Mumford used, she included quick ethics, to support the business process. By including quick ethics in the process, it created the business process to become more efficient and more effective in attaining business objectives and was able to offer a higher quality working environment that inspires staff.

Furthermore, Mumford’s work around Ethics Methodology, change management, and the humanly acceptable development of systems to provide an ethically acceptable way for the use technology was supported by Critical Research in Information Systems (CRIS) as many of ideas that still dominate Critical Research, which aim to improve the Social Reality. The overlapping theories between Mumford’s work and CRIS are related to change and change management, which have links to the issues of power and coercion. Mumford’s also uses wording derived from the Marxist tradition of Critical Research, for example the ‘ideology of capitalism’. Mumford also debated the commodification of computing and working time, which is also identified as a critical research area. Making Enid Mumford’s work around Ethics Methodology and Change very important in today’s economy.

Effective Technical and Human Implementation of Computer Systems (ETHICS) method is made to help integrate the company and its aims with that of its stakeholders. ETHICS uses a mix of technology and people participation to come up with solutions. The ETHICS method can greatly contribute to encourage people to embrace change and adopt new technological solution, thus resulting in higher job satisfaction and efficiency. This ETHICS method follows 15 steps for designing new systems, they start with asking why to change and then end with the evaluation and testing to see if it is achieving what is required.

Designing human systems for new technology (Ethics) methods that are transforming virtually every aspect of human life, interaction, and the process of work. such changes are drastically evident in the way in which human work is performed and organised. the ethics states that the bridge builders in IT development aim to understands the users from a presentation perspective, furthermore, to work in collaboration in the development and growth of IT artifacts, which then results in serving the interests of the stakeholders.

=== Action Research ===
A theoretical foundation in Mumford’s career was Action research – an approach adopted from the Tavistock Institute in which analysis and theory are associated with remedial change. She believed "There should be no theory without practice and no practice without research." Whilst working at Turner’s Asbestos Cement, she used this approach to survey the sales office, who then discussed their problems internally and implemented a work structure that alleviated most of their efficiency and job satisfaction problems.

== Enid Mumford: a tribute ==
Nineteen individuals influenced by Enid Mumford contributed to Enid Mumford: A Tribute, an article reflecting on Mumford's contributions.

== Publications ==
Enid Mumford has produced a large number of publications and books in the field of sociotechnical design. A selection:

- 1989. XSEL's Progress: the continuing journey of an expert system. Wiley.
- 1995. Effective Systems Design and Requirements Analysis: the ETHICS Approach. Macmillan.
- 1996. Systems Design: Ethical Tools for Ethical Change. Macmillan.
- 1999. Dangerous Decisions: problem solving in tomorrow's world. Plenum.
- 2003. Redesigning Human Systems. Idea Publishing Group.
- 2006. Designing human systems: an agile update to ETHICS

=== Books and book chapters ===
- Mumford, E. (1983). Designing Secretaries: The Participative Design of a Word Processing System. Manchester Business School, UK. ISBN 0-903-8082-5-0. First published 1983, http://www.opengrey.eu/item/display/10068/558836
- Mumford, E. (1996). Systems design in an unstable environment. Systems Design Ethical Tools for Ethical Change, 30–45. https://doi.org/10.1007/978-1-349-14199-9_3, Macmillan, Basingstoke, UK. ISBN 0-333-66946-0. First published January 1996,
- Mumford E. (1996). An Ethical Pioneer: Mary Parker Follett. Chapter 4. pp 46–63. In “Systems Design Ethical Tools for Ethical Change”. Palgrave, London. ISBN 978-1-349-14199-9, First published: January 1996, https://doi.org/10.1007/978-1-349-14199-9_4
- Mumford Enid (1996). Designing for freedom in the ethical company. Chapter 6. pp79–98. In "Systems Design Ethical Tools for Ethical Change". Palgrave, London, UK. ISBN 978-1-349-14199-9. First published on: 11 November 1996, doi:10.1007/978-1-349-14199-9_6
- Mumford Enid (1997). Requirements Analysis for Information Systems. Chapter 3. pp 15–20. In “Systems for Sustainability”, which is edited by Frank A. Stowell, Ray L. Ison, Rosalind Armson, Jacky Holloway, Sue Jackson and Steve McRobb. Springer, Boston, MA. ISBN 978-1-4899-0265-8. First published 31 July 1997. doi:10.1007/978-1-4899-0265-8
- Mumford, E. (1999). The Problems of Problem Solving. In Dangerous Decisions: Problem Solving in Tomorrow’s World (pp. 13–24). Springer, Boston, MA. https://doi.org/10.1007/978-0-585-27445-4_2
- Mumford, E. (1999). Dangerous Decisions Problem Solving in Tomorrow's World. [ebook] Chapter 4, Problem Solving and the Police pp. 59–73. First published on: 31 May 1999 https://link.springer.com/book/10.1007/b102291
- Mumford, E. (2001). Action Research: Helping Organizations to Change. Chapter 3.pp. 46–77. In”Qualitative Research in IS: Issues and Trends”,edited by Trauth, Eileen M., UK.1-930708-06-8. First published:1 July 2000, https://www.igi-global.com/gateway/chapter/28259
- Mumford Enid & Carolyn Axtell (2003). Tools and Methods to Support the Design and Implementation of New Work Systems. Chapter 17. pp 331–346. In “The new workplace: a guide to the human impact of modern working practices”, edited by David Holman David Holman, Toby D. Wall, Chris W. Clegg, Paul Sparrow and Ann Howard. Wiley & Sons, Chichester, UK. ISBN 0-471-48543-8. First published: 1 January 2002, doi:10.1002/9780470713365.ch17 Publisher link: villey.com
- Mumford, Enid (2003). Redesigning human systems. Hershey, PA: Information Science Pub. ISBN 0-585-47581-4. OCLC 53207253.
- Enid Mumford, Steve Hickey, and Holly Matthies (2006). Designing Human Systems for New Technology - The ETHICS Method, by Enid Mumford (1983) ISBN 0-903-808-285 Pages 37–51 https://books.google.com/books?id=he9NuM64WN8C&pg=PP1
