= Mary Hemingway Rees =

English psychiatrist

Mary Hemingway Rees MRCS LRCP
- Born: Mary Isobel Hemingway; 10 September 1887; Melton Mowbray, Leicestershire, England
- Died: 4 October 1954 (aged 67); London, England
- Occupation: Psychiatrist
- Spouse: John Rawlings Rees (m. 1921)
- Children: 1

Mary Hemingway Rees (10 September 1887 – 4 October 1954), born Mary Isobel Hemingway, was an English psychiatrist.

== Early life ==
Mary Isobel Hemingway was born in Melton Mowbray. She was the daughter of Charles Robert Hemingway, CBE, JP, a railway contractor.

== Education ==
She studied at Cheltenham Ladies’ College, followed by medical education at the Universities of Edinburgh, Glasgow, and Birmingham.

== Career ==
She qualified as a medic in 1914. After qualifying, she worked in obstetrics at Queen’s Hospital and Birmingham General Hospital. Between 1916 and 1918, she worked at St Chad’s Hospital, Birmingham.

After the First World War, Mary Hemingway worked as the resident medical officer at Bowden House, a nursing home for psychiatric patients run by Hugh Crichton-Miller. At Bowden, she met the psychiatrist John Rawlings Rees, whom she married in 1921. ‘J.R.’ and Crichton-Miller established the Tavistock Clinic in 1920, and Hemingway Rees joined the staff there as a psychiatrist. Hemingway Rees continued her work with patients at the Tavistock throughout World War II.

In addition to being a practicing psychiatrist, Hemingway Rees was an active member of the Medical Women's Federation, and was the chairman of its committee on psychological medicine. She also supported charitable causes. Hemingway Rees was a founder of the World Federation for Mental Health (of which her husband became the first president), and hosted WFMH events and participated in both the scientific and social programmes of meetings.

== Death and legacy ==
She died shortly after returning from the WFMH Congress in Canada in 1954: the Federation acknowledged her contribution to the field by establishing the Mary Hemingway Rees Memorial Lecture. This lecture, delivered annually to the WFMH congress since 1958, addresses the theme of ‘spiritual values in mental health’, in accordance with her interests.
