= James Grotstein =

James S. Grotstein (November 8, 1925, Ohio – May 30, 2015, Los Angeles, California) was a psychiatrist and psychoanalyst.

== Career ==
He was known for his role in the popularization and explication of the work of Melanie Klein and Wilfred Bion. Among other topics, he expanded on Klein's notions of the paranoid-schizoid and depressive positions. His roles in psychoanalytic organizations included serving as North American Vice President of the International Psychoanalytical Association (IPA), and on the editorial board of the International Journal of Psychoanalysis (IJP).

Grotstein served as a hospital corpsman in the U.S. Navy during the Second World War. He earned his B.S. from the University of Akron in 1948 and his M.D. from Western Reserve University (later Case Western Reserve University) in 1952. He completed his medical internship at Michael Reese Hospital in Chicago. He trained in psychiatry at Pennsylvania Hospital, the Veterans Administration Hospital in Los Angeles, and UCLA's Neuropsychiatric Institute (where he served as the first Chief Resident, 1955–56).

In addition to his private practice in Los Angeles, he was professor of clinical psychiatry at UCLA and associated with both the Los Angeles Psychoanalytic Society and Institute (LAPSI, now the New Center for Psychoanalysis) and the Psychoanalytic Center of California (PCC).

== Select publications ==
- 1981 Grotstein, J. S. ‘Wilfred R. Bion: The man, the psychoanalyst, the mystic. A perspective on his life and work‘. Contemporary Psychoanalysis, 17:501–536.
- 1981 Grotstein, J.S. Splitting and Projective Identification. New York: Jason Aronson.
- 1985 Grotstein, J. S. ‘The evolving and shifting trends in psychoanalysis and psychotherapy‘. Journal of the American Academy of Psychoanalysis and Dynamic Psychiatry, 13(4):423–452.
- 1989 Grotstein, J. S. ‘A revised psychoanalytic conception of schizophrenia: an interdisciplinary update’. Psychoanalytic Psychology, 6(3):253–275.
- 2000 Grotstein, J. S. Who is the Dreamer Who Dreams the Dream? A Study of Psychic Presences. The Analytic Press.
- 2004 Grotstein, J.S. ‘Notes on the superego‘. Psychoanalytic Inquiry, 24(2):257–270.
- 2007 Grotstein, J. S. A Beam of Intense Darkness: Wilfred Bion’s Legacy to Psychoanalysis. Karnac.
- 2009 Grotstein, J. S. But at the Same Time and on Another Level: Volume 1: Psychoanalytic Theory and Technique in the Kleinian/Bionian Mode. Karnac.
- 2009 Grotstein, J. S. But at the Same Time and on Another Level: Volume 2: Clinical Applications in the Kleinian/Bionian Mode. Karnac.
