= Sociotechnical system =

Organizational development approach

Sociotechnical systems (STS) in organizational development is an approach to complex organizational work design that recognizes the interaction between people and technology in workplaces. The term also refers to coherent systems of human relations, technical objects, and cybernetic processes that are inherent to large, complex infrastructures. Social society, and its constituent substructures, qualify as complex sociotechnical systems.

The term sociotechnical systems was coined by Eric Trist, Ken Bamforth and Fred Emery, in the World War II era, based on their work with workers in English coal mines at the Tavistock Institute in London. Sociotechnical systems pertains to theory regarding the social aspects of people and society and technical aspects of organizational structure and processes. Here, technical does not necessarily imply material technology. The focus is on procedures and related knowledge, i.e. it refers to the ancient Greek term techne. "Technical" is a term used to refer to structure and a broader sense of technicalities. Sociotechnical refers to the interrelatedness of social and technical aspects of an organization or the society as a whole.

Sociotechnical theory is about joint optimization, with a shared emphasis on achievement of both excellence in technical performance and quality in people's work lives. Sociotechnical theory, as distinct from sociotechnical systems, proposes a number of different ways of achieving joint optimization. They are usually based on designing different kinds of organization, according to which the functional output of different sociotechnical elements leads to system efficiency, productive sustainability, user satisfaction, and change management. Sociotechnical approaches are critical to providing resilience to complex systems. The notion of a system of sociotechnical systems has been introduced to address the need to optimize connected but largely independent complex systems that can be imagined, for example, within a broad-scale intelligent road network system consisting of autonomous vehicles, traffic management centers, service providers, delivery services, etc. and interfacing with a broader logistical network.

== Overview ==
Therefore, sociotechnical theory is about joint optimization, that is, designing the social system and technical system in tandem so that they work smoothly together. Sociotechnical theory, as distinct from sociotechnical systems, proposes a number of different ways of achieving joint optimization. They are usually based on designing different kinds of organization, ones in which the relationships between socio and technical elements lead to the emergence of productivity and wellbeing, rather than all too often case of new technology failing to meet the expectations of designers and users alike.

The key elements of the STS approach include combining the human elements and the technical systems together to enable new possibilities for work and pave the way for technological change (Trist, 1981). The involvement of human elements in negotiations may cause a larger workload initially, but it is crucial that requirements can be determined and accommodated for prior to implementation as it is central to the systems success. Due to its mutual causality (Davis, 1977), the STS approach has become widely linked with autonomy, completeness and job satisfaction as both systems can work together to achieving a goal.

Enid Mumford (1983) defines the socio-technical approach to recognize technology and people to ensure work systems are highly efficient and contain better characteristics which leads to higher job satisfaction for employees, resulting in a sense of fulfilment to improving quality of work and exceeding expectations. Mumford concludes that the development of information systems is not a technical issue, but a business organization issue which is concerned with the process of change.

== Principles ==
Some of the central principles of sociotechnical theory were elaborated in a seminal paper by Eric Trist and Ken Bamforth in 1951.

"The key elements of the STS approach include combining the human elements and the technical systems together to enable new possibilities for work and pave the way for technological change. Due to its mutual causality, the STS approach has become widely linked with autonomy, completeness and job satisfaction as both systems can work together to achieving a goal."

=== Responsible autonomy ===
Sociotechnical theory was pioneering for its shift in emphasis, a shift towards considering teams or groups as the primary unit of analysis and not the individual. Sociotechnical theory pays particular attention to internal supervision and leadership at the level of the "group" and refers to it as "responsible autonomy". The overriding point seems to be that having the simple ability of individual team members being able to perform their function is not the only predictor of group effectiveness. There are a range of issues in team cohesion research, for example, that are answered by having the regulation and leadership internal to a group or team.

These, and other factors, play an integral and parallel role in ensuring successful teamwork which sociotechnical theory exploits. The idea of semi-autonomous groups conveys a number of further advantages. Not least among these, especially in hazardous environments, is the often felt need on the part of people in the organisation for a role in a small primary group. Such a need arises in cases where the means for effective communication are often somewhat limited. As Carvalho states, this is because "...operators use verbal exchanges to produce continuous, redundant and recursive interactions to successfully construct and maintain individual and mutual awareness...".

The key to responsible autonomy seems to be to design an organization possessing the characteristics of small groups whilst preventing the "silo-thinking" and "stovepipe" neologisms of contemporary management theory. In order to preserve "...intact the loyalties on which the small group [depend]...the system as a whole [needs to contain] its bad in a way that [does] not destroy its good".

=== Adaptability ===
Carvajal states that "the rate at which uncertainty overwhelms an organisation is related more to its internal structure than to the amount of environmental uncertainty". Sitter in 1997 offered two solutions for organisations confronted, like the military, with an environment of increased (and increasing) complexity: "The first option is to restore the fit with the external complexity by an increasing internal complexity. ...This usually means the creation of more staff functions or the enlargement of staff-functions and/or the investment in vertical information systems". Vertical information systems are often confused for "network enabled capability" systems (NEC) but an important distinction needs to be made, which Sitter et al. propose as their second option: "...the organisation tries to deal with the external complexity by 'reducing' the internal control and coordination needs. ...This option might be called the strategy of 'simple organisations and complex jobs'". This all contributes to a number of unique advantages. Firstly is the issue of "human redundancy" in which "groups of this kind were free to set their own targets, so that aspiration levels with respect to production could be adjusted to the age and stamina of the individuals concerned". Human redundancy speaks towards the flexibility, ubiquity and pervasiveness of resources within NEC.

The second issue is that of complexity. Complexity lies at the heart of many organisational contexts (there are numerous organizational paradigms that struggle to cope with it). Trist and Bamforth (1951) could have been writing about these with the following passage: "A very large variety of unfavourable and changing environmental conditions is encountered ... many of which are impossible to predict. Others, though predictable, are impossible to alter."

Many types of organisations are clearly motivated by the appealing "industrial age", rational principles of "factory production", a particular approach to dealing with complexity: "In the factory a comparatively high degree of control can be exercised over the complex and moving "figure" of a production sequence, since it is possible to maintain the "ground" in a comparatively passive and constant state". On the other hand, many activities are constantly faced with the possibility of "untoward activity in the 'ground'" of the 'figure-ground' relationship" The central problem, one that appears to be at the nub of many problems that "classic" organisations have with complexity, is that "The instability of the 'ground' limits the applicability ... of methods derived from the factory".

In Classic organisations, problems with the moving "figure" and moving "ground" often become magnified through a much larger social space, one in which there is a far greater extent of hierarchical task interdependence.

=== Whole tasks ===
Another concept in sociotechnical theory is the "whole task". A whole task "has the advantage of placing responsibility for the ... task squarely on the shoulders of a single, small, face-to-face group which experiences the entire cycle of operations within the compass of its membership." The Sociotechnical embodiment of this principle is the notion of minimal critical specification. This principle states that, "While it may be necessary to be quite precise about what has to be done, it is rarely necessary to be precise about how it is done".

The key factor in minimally critically specifying tasks is the responsible autonomy of the group to decide, based on local conditions, how best to undertake the task in a flexible adaptive manner. This principle is isomorphic with ideas like effects-based operations (EBO). EBO asks the question of what goal is it that we want to achieve, what objective is it that we need to reach rather than what tasks have to be undertaken, when and how. The EBO concept enables the managers to "...manipulate and decompose high level effects. They must then assign lesser effects as objectives for subordinates to achieve. The intention is that subordinates' actions will cumulatively achieve the overall effects desired".

=== Meaningfulness of tasks ===
Effects-based operations and the notion of a "whole task", combined with adaptability and responsible autonomy, have additional advantages for those at work in the organization. This is because "for each participant the task has total significance and dynamic closure".

Greater interdependence (through diffuse processes such as globalisation) also bring with them an issue of size, in which "the scale of a task transcends the limits of simple spatio-temporal structure. By this is meant conditions under which those concerned can complete a job in one place at one time, i.e., the situation of the face-to-face, or singular group". In other words, in classic organisations the "wholeness" of a task is often diminished by multiple group integration and spatiotemporal disintegration.

== Topics ==
=== Sociotechnical system ===
Social technical means that technology, which by definition, should not be allowed to be the controlling factor when new work systems are implemented. So in order to be classified as 'Sociotechnical', equal attention must be paid to providing a high quality and satisfying work environment for employees.

The Tavistock researchers, presented that employees who will be using the new and improved system, should be participating in determining the required quality of working life improvements. Participative socio‐technical design can be achieved by in‐depth interviews, questionnaires and collection of data.

Participative socio-technical design can be conducted through in-depth interviews, the collection of statistics and the analysis of relevant documents. These will provide important comparative data that can help approve or disprove the chosen hypotheses. A common approach to participative design is, whenever possible, to use a democratically selected user design group as the key information collectors and decision makers. The design group is backed by a committee of senior staff who can lay the foundations and subsequently oversee the project.

Alter describes sociotechnical analysis and design methods to not be a strong point in the information systems practice. The aim of socio-technical designs is to optimise and join both social and technical systems. However, the problem is that of the technical and social system along with the work system and joint optimisation are not defined as they should be.

=== Sustainability ===
Standalone, incremental improvements are not sufficient to address current, let alone future sustainability challenges. These challenges will require deep changes of sociotechnical systems. Theories on innovation systems; sustainable innovations; system thinking and design; and sustainability transitions, among others, have attempted to describe potential changes capable of shifting development towards more sustainable directions.

=== Autonomous work teams ===
Autonomous work teams also called self-managed teams, are an alternative to traditional assembly line methods. Rather than having a large number of employees each do a small operation to assemble a product, the employees are organized into small teams, each of which is responsible for assembling an entire product. These teams are self-managed, and are independent of one another.

In the mid-1970s, Pehr Gyllenhammar created his new “dock assembly” work system at Volvo’s Kalmar Plant. Instead of the traditional flow line system of car production, self-managed teams would assemble the entire car. The idea of worker directors – a director on the company board who is a representative of the workforce – was established through this project and the Swedish government required them in state enterprises.

=== Job enrichment ===
Job enrichment in organizational development, human resources management, and organizational behavior, is the process of giving the employee a wider and higher level scope of responsibility with increased decision-making authority. This is the opposite of job enlargement, which simply would not involve greater authority. Instead, it will only have an increased number of duties.

The concept of minimal critical specifications. (Mumford, 2006) states workers should be told what to do but not how to do it. Deciding this should be left to their initiative. She says they can be involved in work groups, matrices and networks. The employee should receive correct objectives but they decide how to achieve these objectives.

=== Motivation ===
Motivation in psychology refers to the initiation, direction, intensity and persistence of behavior. Motivation is a temporal and dynamic state that should not be confused with personality or emotion. Motivation is having the desire and willingness to do something. A motivated person can be reaching for a long-term goal such as becoming a professional writer or a more short-term goal like learning how to spell a particular word. Personality invariably refers to more or less permanent characteristics of an individual's state of being (e.g., shy, extrovert, conscientious). As opposed to motivation, emotion refers to temporal states that do not immediately link to behavior (e.g., anger, grief, happiness). With the view that socio-technical design is by which intelligence and skill combined with emerging technologies could improve the work-life balance of employees, it is also believed that the aim is to achieve both a safer and more pleasurable workplace as well as to see greater democracy in society. The achievement of these aims would therefore lead to increased motivation of employees and would directly and positively influence their ability to express ideas. Enid Mumford's work on redesigning designing human systems also expressed that it is the role of the facilitator to “keep the members interested and motivated toward the design task, to help them resolve any conflicts”.

Mumford reflects on leadership within organisations, because lack of leadership has proven to be the downfall of most companies. As competition increases employers have lost their valued and qualified employees to their competitors. Opportunities such as better job roles and an opportunity to work your way up has motivated these employees to join their rivals. Mumford suggests that a delegation of responsibility could help employees stay motivated as they would feel appreciated and belonging thus keeping them in their current organization. Leadership is key as employees would prefer following a structure and knowing that there is opportunity to improve.

When Mumford analysed the role of user participation during two ES projects A drawback that was found was that users found it difficult to see beyond their current practices and found it difficult to anticipate how things can be done differently. Motivation was found to be another challenge during this process as users were not interested in participating (Wagner, 2007).

=== Work System Theory (WST) and Work System Method (WSM) ===
The WST and WSM simplifies the conceptualization of traditional complicated socio-technical system (STS) approach (Alter, 2015). Extending the prior research on STS which divides social and technical aspects; WST combines the two perspectives in a work system and outlines the framework for WSM which considers work system as the system of interest and proposes solutions accordingly (Alter, 2015).

The Work System Theory (WST) and Work System Method (WSM) are both forms of socio-technical systems but in the form of work systems. Also, the Work System Method encourages the use of both socio-technical ideas and values when it comes to IS development, use and implementation.

=== Evolution of socio-technical systems ===
The evolution of socio-technical design has seen its development from being approached as a social system exclusively. The realisation of the joint optimisation of social and technical systems was later realised. It was divided into sections where primary work which looks into principles and description, and how to incorporate technical designs on a macrosocial level.

=== Benefits of seeing sociotechnical systems through a work system lens ===
Analysing and designing sociotechnical systems from a work system perspective and eliminates the artificial distinction of the social system from the technical system. This also eliminates the idea of joint optimization. By using a work system lens in can bring many benefits, such as:

- Viewing the work system as a whole, making it easier to discuss and analyse
- More organised approach by even outlining basic understanding of a work system
- A readily usable analysis method making it more adaptable for performing analysis of a work system
- Does not require guidance by experts and researchers
- Reinforces the idea that a work system exists to produce a product(s)/service(s)
- Easier to theorize potential staff reductions, job roles changing and reorganizations
- Encourages motivation and good will while reducing the stress from monitoring
- Conscientious that documentation and practice may differ

=== Social network / structure ===
The social network perspective first started in 1920 at Harvard University within the Sociology Department. Within information systems social networks have been used to study behaviour of teams, organisations and Industries. Social network perspective is useful for studying some of the emerging forms of social or organisational arrangements and the roles of ICT.

=== Social media and Artificial Intelligence ===
Recent work on Artificial Intelligence considers large Sociotechnical Systems, such as social networks and online marketplaces, as agents whose behaviour can be purposeful and adaptive. The behaviour of recommender systems can therefore be analysed in the language and framework of sociotechnical systems, leading also to a new perspective for their legal regulation.

=== Multi-directional inheritance ===
Multi-directional inheritance is the premise that work systems inherit their purpose, meaning and structure from the organisation and reflect the priorities and purposes of the organisation that encompasses them. Fundamentally, this premise includes crucial assumptions about sequencing, timescales, and precedence. The purpose, meaning and structure can derive from multiple contexts and once obtained it can be passed on to the sociotechnical systems that emerge throughout the organisation.

=== Sociological perspective on sociotechnical systems ===
A 1990s research interest in social dimensions of IS directed to relationship among IS development, uses, and resultant social and organizational changes offered fresh insight into the emerging role of ICT within differing organizational context; drawing directly on sociological theories of institution. This sociotechnical research has informed if not shaped IS scholarship. Sociological theories have offered a solid basis upon which emerging sociotechnical research built.

=== ETHICS history ===
Enid Mumfords ETHICS development was a push from her to remind those in the field that research doesn't always need to be done on things of current interest and following the immediate trends over your current research is not always the way forward. A reminder that work should always be finished and we should never “write them off with no outcome.” as she said.

STS principles are directly applied in modern software architecture and DevOps practices. The concept of joint optimization guides the design of technical systems (e.g., microservices, cloud infrastructure) alongside the social structure of the teams developing and maintaining them. This interaction is often captured by Conway's Law, which posits that the structure of a system will mirror the communication structure of the organization that builds it. The STS perspective is used to counteract the negative effects of this law by aligning team topology with service architecture.

In high-risk sectors like aviation, healthcare, and critical infrastructure, STS serves as a core analytical framework for understanding and mitigating system failures. Failures are viewed not as purely technical malfunctions or simple human errors, but as emergent properties arising from complex interactions within the sociotechnical system. Resilience Engineering (RE) explicitly adopts this view, shifting the focus from preventing failure (Safety-I) to ensuring things go right (Safety-II)—by studying how human personnel adapt and cope with complexity to maintain system safety.

Cybersecurity is fundamentally a sociotechnical challenge. While many frameworks have been techno-centric, an STS perspective views the system as having both a technical sub-system (firewalls, software) and a social sub-system (organizational culture, security policies, and user behavior). Achieving cyber resilience—the ability to maintain essential functions despite attacks—requires the joint optimization of both, recognizing that the human element often constitutes the critical failure point.

The Techné Distinction and System Scope

A crucial element of the original STS framework that retains relevance in contemporary analysis is the distinction of the "technical" sub-system. It refers not only to material technology (e.g., machinery or computer hardware) but also to procedures, processes, and the necessary specialized knowledge—a concept rooted in the ancient Greek notion of techné (craft or art).

In 21st-century STS analysis, this broad scope is vital. It ensures that analysis goes beyond material technology (like an AI algorithm) to include the procedures, workflows, and expert knowledge required to deploy, govern, and ethically manage that technology. This distinction prevents an overly simplistic focus solely on hardware and software, guaranteeing that factors like workflow design and knowledge transfer are properly included in the sociotechnical scope.

== See also ==
- Complex systems – System composed of many interacting components
- Cybernetics – Study of circular causal processes
- Feedback – Process where information about current status is used to influence future status
- Human factors – Designing systems to suit their users
- Remote work – Employees working from any location
- Social machine
- Social network – Social structure made up of a set of social actors
- Sociology – Scientific study of human society and relationships
- Sociotechnology – Study of processes on the intersection of society and technology
- Systems theory – Interdisciplinary study of systems
- Systems science – Study of the nature of systems
