= Tavistock Institute =

British not-for-profit organisation

Tavistock Institute of Human Relations
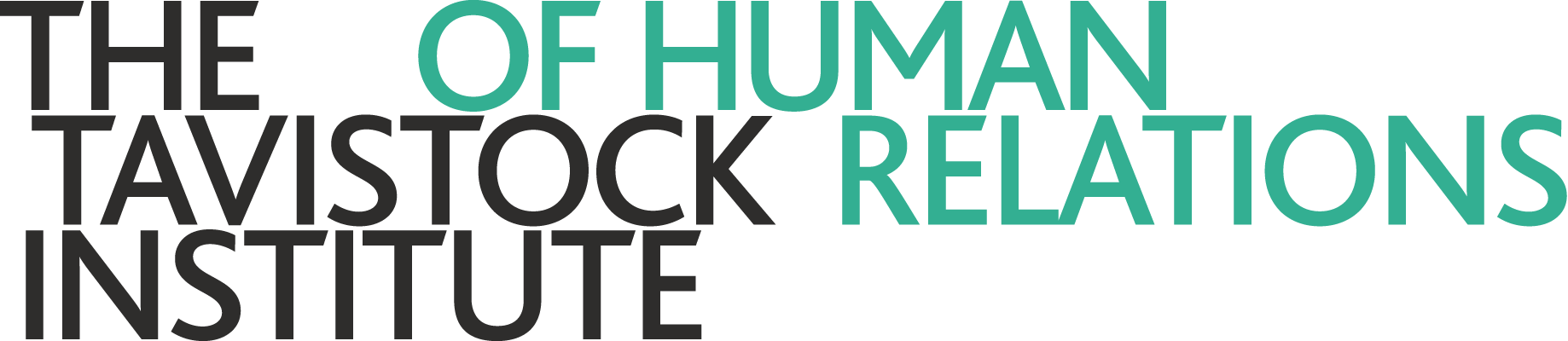

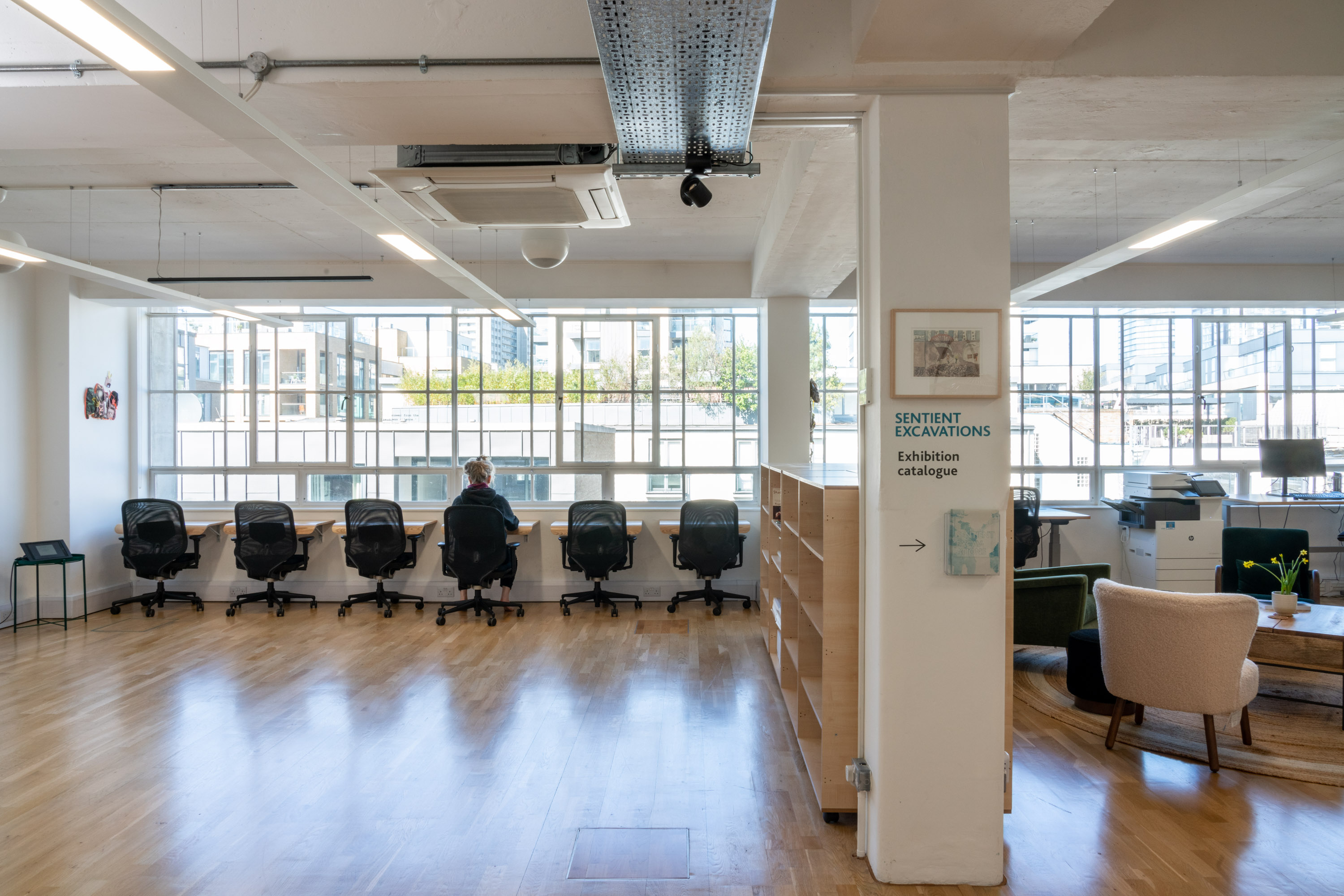
- Abbreviation: TIHR
- Formation: 20 September 1947; 79 years ago
- Founders: Elliott Jaques, Henry Dicks, Leonard Browne, Ronald Hargreaves, John Rawlings Rees, Mary Luff, Wilfred Bion, and Tommy Wilson
- Legal status: Charity
- Purpose: To improve working life and conditions for people within organisations, communities and broader societies
- Headquarters: Featherstone Street, London
- Location: Featherstone Street, London
- Region served: United Kingdom
- Services: action research, organisational development and change consultancy, evaluation, executive coaching and professional development
- Fields: Social Science: trans-disciplinary
- CEO: Dr Eliat Aram
- Parent organization: The Tavistock Association
- Website: www.tavinstitute.org

The Tavistock Institute of Human Relations is a British non-profit research and consulting organisation, specialising in the study of group behaviour. There are sister organisations in China and Germany.

It was formally established in September 1947. It publishes a peer-reviewed journal Human Relations with Sage Publications and it hosts the journal Evaluation. The institute is located in Featherstone Street in Old Street, Clerkenwell, London.

== Activities ==
The Tavistock Institute offers research, consultancy, project evaluation work and professional development programmes, based on unique methodologies drawn from social sciences and applied psychology. Methods include systems psychodynamics, complexity theory, Theory of Change and Social Dreaming. The main method is experiential learning - learning through experience.

The institute's website describes its work as having a focus on how humans relate to each other and non-human systems, how people grow and learn and effect creativity and change, in groups.

=== Research, evaluation and consultancy ===
The institute's portfolio includes leadership development programmes in the NHS, work with female innovators in European sustainable fashion via the "shemakes" collaboration, a five-year programme of work with women and girls' projects in England, an evaluation of Barnardo's work with care-experienced young people, including a focus on the voices of the young people, and a study of continuing vocational education for the European Union.

The institute's clients are individuals, teams, organisations and partnerships of organisations – undertaking work and projects in government, business / industry and the 3rd & 4th sectors at local, national and international level. The list includes organisations and sectors of all shapes and sizes, from grassroots community-based organisations to government agencies. Examples include the European Union, many British government departments, Third Sector and private clients.

In 2023, the institute's organisation in Europe, Tavistock Institut gGmbH, based in Germany, moved its office to Berlin. The institute has an arm in China - Tavistock Institute China.

=== Professional development ===
The professional development and training work that the institute offers is in the fields of organisation development and group relations.

The institute is developing online training courses available on the Teachable website

Learning programmes are tailored and delivered in-house or online for organisations, including the NHS

=== Sharing knowledge ===
The academic journal Human Relations is owned by the Tavistock Institute and published by Sage.

Recent books and reports published by authors linked to the Institute include a Systems Psychodynamics trilogy, a book on the Theory of Change and how it can be used to support organisational development and a report on labour shortages in the European Union published by Eurofound.

== History ==
The early history of the Tavistock Institute overlaps with that of the Tavistock Clinic because many of the staff from the Clinic worked on new, large-scale projects during World War II, and it was as a result of this work that the institute was established.

During the war, staff from the Tavistock Clinic played key roles in British Army psychiatry. Working with colleagues in the Royal Army Medical Corps and the British Army, they were responsible for innovations such as the War Office Selection Boards (WOSBs) and Civil Resettlement Units (CRUs). The group that formed around the WOSBs and CRUs were fascinated by this work with groups and organisations, and sought to continue research in this field after the war. Various influential figures had visited the WOSBs during the war, so there was scope for consultancy work, but the Clinic staff also planned to become a part of the National Health Service when it was established, and they had been warned that such consultancy and research would not be possible under the auspices of the NHS. Because of this, the Tavistock Institute of Human Relations was created in 1947 to carry out work specifically with organisations once the Clinic was incorporated into the NHS. The Rockefeller Foundation awarded a significant grant that facilitated the creation of the institute.

In the early years, income was derived from research grants, contract work, and fees for professional development courses. During the 1950s and 1960s, the institute carried out a number of signature projects in collaboration with major manufacturing companies including Unilever, the Ahmedabad Manufacturing and Calico Printing Co., Shell, Bayer, and Glacier Metals. They also conducted work for the National Coal Board. Particular focuses included management, women in the workplace, and the adoption (or rejection) of new technologies. Projects on the interaction between people and technology later became known as the sociotechnical approach.

The 1950s also saw the institute conducting consumer research and exploring attitudes to things as varied as Bovril, fish fingers, coffee and hair.

In the 1960s and 1970s, there was a notable focus on public health organisations such as hospitals. Studies examined a range of aspects of healthcare, from ward management and operating theatres to the organisation of cleaning staff.

More recently, the institute has conducted work for the European Commission and British government bodies.

=== Research units ===
In the institute's early years, there were four main units: Programme Groups A and B within a Committee on Human Resources; Organisation and Social Change and Operations Research Unit; and a Committee on Family and Community Psychiatry.

The Human Resources Centre (HRC) and the Centre for Applied Social Research (CASR) were established in the 1950s, and in 1963 the Institute of Operational Research (IOR) was established in conjunction with the British Operational Research Society. The Centre for Organisational and Operational Research (COOR) was created from a merger of the HRC and the IOR in 1979.

The Self Help Alliance project begun in the 1980s led to further work in evaluation and the creation of a dedicated unit, the Evaluation Development Review Unit (EDRU) in 1990.

=== Key figures ===
The institute was founded by a group of key figures from the Tavistock Clinic and British Army psychiatry including Elliott Jaques, Henry Dicks, Leonard Browne, Ronald Hargreaves, John Rawlings Rees, Mary Luff and Wilfred Bion, with Tommy Wilson as chairman. Other well-known people that joined the group shortly after were Isabel Menzies Lyth, J. D. Sutherland, John Bowlby, Eric Trist, Michael Balint and Fred Emery. Although he died before the TIHR was formally established, Kurt Lewin was an important influence on the work of the Tavistock: he was a notable influence on Trist, and contributed an article to the first issue of Human Relations.

Many of the members of the Tavistock Institute went on to play major roles in psychology. John Rawlings Rees became first president of the World Federation for Mental Health. Jock Sutherland became director of the new post-war Tavistock Clinic, when it was incorporated into the newly established British National Health Service in 1946. Ronald Hargreaves became deputy director of the World Health Organization. Tommy Wilson became chairman of the Tavistock Institute. One of the most influential figures to emerge from the institute was the psychoanalyst Isabel Menzies Lyth. Her seminal paper 'A case study in the functioning of social systems as a defence against anxiety' (1959) inspired a whole branch of organisational theory emphasising unconscious forces that shape organizational life. A.K. Rice did considerable work on problems of management, increasing productivity at one factory by 300%. Eric Miller became director of the Group Relation Program in 1969, and in this function he later developed the design of the Nazareth-Conferences.

The Tavistock Institute became known as a major proponent in Britain for psychoanalysis and the psychodynamic theories of Sigmund Freud and his followers. Other names associated with the Tavistock include Melanie Klein, Carl Gustav Jung, J. A. Hadfield, Charles Rycroft, Enid Mumford and R. D. Laing. (Note: Laing came to the Tavistock Institute in 1956 at the invitation of Jock Sutherland, who was then director of the Tavistock Clinic, to train on a grant. His training, under Charles Rycroft, was at the Institute of Psychoanalysis.)

== Tavistock for the workplace ==
The techniques used to rehabilitate soldiers were believed by some researchers to be applicable to a more human-centered organisation of work in industry by empowering lower ranking employees. This agenda helped showcase the two sociotechnical scholarship attributes: the close association of technological and social systems and also, the importance of worker involvement.

== Focus of conspiracy theorists ==
The Tavistock Institute has sometimes been associated with conspiracy theories, the most common of which associate it with the Beatles and the Rolling Stones. Two books focusing on this are The Tavistock Institute of Human Relations: Shaping the Moral, Spiritual, Cultural and Political (2006) by John Coleman and Tavistock Institute: Social Engineering the Masses (2015) by Daniel Estulin.

The Rough Guide to Conspiracy Theories notes that the Tavistock Institute has been named by some conspiracy theorists as having a part in "The most extravagant anti-Illuminati conspiracy theory" of John Coleman "known as [the] 'Aquarian Conspiracy'. This totalitarian agenda culminates in the Illuminati 'taking control of education in America with the intent and purpose of utterly and completely destroying it.'" By "'means of rock music and drugs to rebel against the status quo, thus undermining and eventually destroying the family unit'." Todd Van Luling, writing in HuffPost also mentioned this idea "from popular conspiracy theorist Dr John Coleman", saying that "The Tavistock Institute is a publicly known British charity founded in 1947, but conspiracy theorists believe the Institute's real purpose is to similarly engineer the world's culture." The Post looks at Coleman's claim that the popularity of the Beatles was an Illuminati plot to advance the "Aquarian Conspiracy".

== Collections ==
The Institute of Education, University College London holds the records of the Group Relations Training Association (GRTA), a national network promoting and supporting personal and organisational growth through group learning methods established by the Tavistock Institute.
