= Human Relations =

Monthly academic journal

- Discipline: Management
- Language: English
- Edited by: Nick Turner University of Calgary

Publication details
- History: 1947–present
- Publisher: SAGE Publications in association with the Tavistock Institute of Human Relations
- Frequency: Monthly
- Impact factor: 3.043 (2017)

Standard abbreviations
- ISO 4: Hum. Relat.

Indexing
- CODEN: HUREAA
- ISSN: 0018-7267 (print); 1741-282X (web)
- LCCN: 50057567
- OCLC no.: 1752393

Links
- Journal homepage; Online access; Online archive; Journal page at publisher website

Human Relations is a monthly peer-reviewed academic journal covering research on social relationships in work-related settings. The journal is published by SAGE Publications on behalf of the Tavistock Institute of Human Relations (London). The journal was established in 1947 by the Tavistock Institute and the Research Center for Group Dynamics at the Massachusetts Institute of Technology.

== Abstracting and indexing ==
According to the Journal Citation Reports, the journal has a 2017 impact factor of 3.043, ranking it 4th out of 98 journals in the category "Social Sciences, Interdisciplinary" and 55th out of 902 journals in the category "Management".
