= Wilfred Bion =

English psychoanalyst and psychiatrist

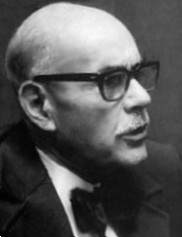
- Born: Ruprecht Bion; 8 September 1897; Mathura, North-Western Provinces, British India
- Died: 28 August 1979 (aged 81); Oxford, Oxfordshire, England
- Education: The Queen's College, Oxford
- Occupation: Psychoanalyst
- Known for: Group processes "The Grid"; Object relations theory Learning from experience (alpha elements, beta elements, and alpha function); Bizarre objects Containment theory
- Spouse(s): Betty Jardine; Francesca Bion
- Children: 3

Wilfred Ruprecht Bion (/biːˈɒn/; 8 September 1897 – 8 November 1979) was an influential English psychoanalyst, who became president of the British Psychoanalytical Society from 1962 to 1965.

== Early life and military service ==
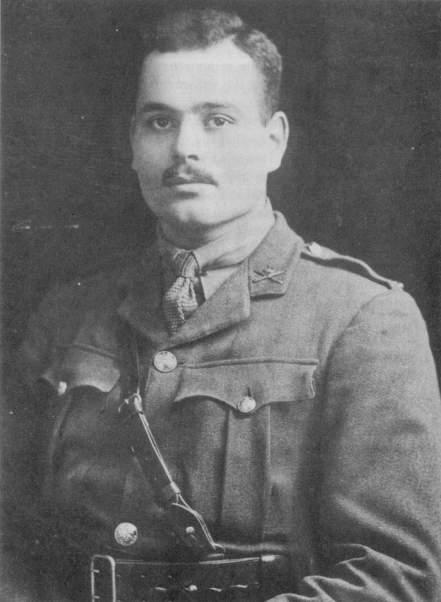
Wilfred Bion in uniform in 1916

Bion was born in Mathura, North-Western Provinces, India, and educated at Bishop's Stortford College in England. After the outbreak of the First World War, he served in the Tank Corps as a tank commander in France, and was awarded both the Distinguished Service Order (DSO) (on 18 February 1918, for his actions at the Battle of Cambrai), and the Croix de Chevalier of the Légion d'honneur. He first entered the war zone on 26 June 1917, and was promoted to temporary lieutenant on 10 June 1918, and to acting captain on 22 March 1918, when he took command of a tank section, he retained the rank when he became second-in-command of a tank company on 19 October 1918, and relinquished it on 7 January 1919. He was demobilised on 1 September 1921, and was granted the rank of captain. The full citation for his DSO reads:

Awarded the Distinguished Service Order.

[...]

T./2nd Lt, Wilfred Ruprecht Bion, Tank Corps.

For conspicuous gallantry, and devotion to duty. When in command of his tank in an attack he engaged a large number of enemy machine guns in strong positions, thus assisting the infantry to advance. When his tank was put out of action by a direct hit he occupied a section of trench with his men and machine guns and opened fire on the enemy. He moved about in the open, giving directions to other tanks when they arrived, and at one period fired a Lewis gun with great effect from the top of his tank. He also got a captured machine gun into action against the enemy, and when reinforcements arrived he took command of a company of infantry whose commander was killed. He showed magnificent courage and initiative in a most difficult situation.

"Bion's daughter, Parthenope...raises the question of just how (and how far) her father was shaped as an analyst by his wartime experiences...under[p]inning Bion's later concern with the coexistence of regressed or primitive proto-mental states alongside more sophisticated one".

== Career ==
In 1945, during the Second World War, Bion's wife Betty Jardine gave birth to a daughter, but Betty died a few days afterwards. His daughter, Parthenope, became a psychoanalyst in Italy, and often lectured and wrote about her father's work. Parthenope died, together with her 18-year-old daughter Patrizia, in a car crash in Italy in July 1998.

Bion's theories, which were always based in the phenomena of the analytic encounter, revealed both correspondences and expansions of core ideas from both Sigmund Freud and Melanie Klein. At one point, he attempted to understand thoughts and thinking from an 'algebraic', 'geometric' and 'mathematised' point of view, believing there to be too little precision in the existing vocabulary, a process culminating in "The Grid". Later he abandoned the complex, abstract applications of mathematics, and the Grid, and developed a more intuitive approach, epitomised in Attention and Interpretation (1970).

In 1968, Bion moved to Los Angeles, California, where he remained until 1977. During those years he mentored a number of psychoanalysts interested in Kleinian approaches, including James Gooch (psychoanalyst) and other founding members of the Psychoanalytic Center of California. Shortly before his death, he returned to Oxfordshire.

== Reception and stature ==
Wilfred Bion was a potent and original contributor to psychoanalysis. He was one of the first to analyse patients in psychotic states using an unmodified analytic technique; he extended existing theories of projective processes and developed new conceptual tools. The degree of collaboration between Hanna Segal, Wilfred Bion and Herbert Rosenfeld in their work with psychotic patients during the late 1950s, and their discussions with Melanie Klein at the time, means that it is not always possible to distinguish their exact individual contributions to the developing theory of splitting, projective identification, unconscious phantasy and the use of countertransference. As Donald Meltzer (1979, 1981), Denis Carpy (1989, p. 287), and Michael Feldman (2009, pp. 33, 42) have pointed out, these three pioneering analysts not only sustained Klein's clinical and theoretical approach, but through an extension of the concept of projective identification and countertransference they deepened and expanded it. In Bion's clinical work and supervision the goal remains insightful understanding of psychic reality through a disciplined experiencing of the transference–countertransference, in a way that promotes the growth of the whole personality.

'Bion's ideas are highly unique', so that he 'remained larger than life to almost all who encountered him'. He has been considered by Neville Symington as possibly "the greatest psychoanalytic thinker...after Freud".

There is some historical evidence to suggest that the idea of containment may have been suggested to Bion in the mid-1930s, by an encounter with C.G.Jung: Bion attended Jung's 1935 lectures at the Tavistock Clinic, in which Bion was an active participant (asking three questions of Jung about a range of aspects of Jung's thinking). The experience was described by James Grotstein, Bion's biographer and "one of Bion's most influential pupils", as having had a "dramatic impact" on Bion.

== Group experiments ==
Bion performed a lot of group experiments when he was put in charge of the training wing of a military hospital. Besides observing the basic assumptions recurring in these groups, he also has observed some very interesting phenomena which he believed may well apply to society.

Bion also claimed that "...what the individual says or does in a group illumines both his own personality and his view of the group; sometimes his contribution illumines one more than the other." This observation is related to the psychological phenomenon of projection.

Bion posited the presence of "anonymous" contributions to a group as the foundations for "a successful system of evasion and denial". A related phenomenon is that of deindividuation.

In Experiences in Groups, Bion asserted that whenever a group is formed, it seeks a leader to follow. Moreover, he claimed that in the absence of a formal leader who satisfies the group, the most mentally ill member of the group will be treated as an informal leader: "In its search for a leader the group finds a paranoid schizophrenic or malignant hysteric if possible; failing either of these, a psychopathic personality with delinquent trends will do; failing a psychopathic personality it will pick on the verbally facile high-grade defective."

== Group dynamics—the "basic assumptions" ==
Wilfred Bion's observations about the role of group processes in group dynamics are set out in Experiences in Groups and Other Papers, written in the 1940s but compiled and published in 1961, where he refers to recurrent emotional states of groups as 'basic assumptions'. Bion argues that in every group, two groups are actually present: the work group, and the basic assumption group. The work group is that aspect of group functioning which has to do with the primary task of the group—what the group has formed to accomplish; will "keep the group anchored to a sophisticated and rational level of behaviour". The basic assumption group describes the tacit underlying assumptions on which the behaviour of the group is based. Bion specifically identified three basic assumptions: dependency, fight–flight, and pairing. When a group adopts any one of these basic assumptions, it interferes with the task the group is attempting to accomplish. Bion believed that interpretation by the therapist of this aspect of group dynamics would, whilst being resisted, also result in potential insight regarding effective, co-operative group work.

In dependency, the essential aim of the group is to attain security through, and have its members protected by, one individual. The basic assumption in this group culture seems to be that an external object exists whose function it is to provide security for the immature individual.

Bion considered that "the three basic-assumption groups seem each in turn to be aggregates of individuals sharing out between them the characteristics of one character in the Oedipal situation". Behind the Oedipal level, however, Bion postulated the existence of still more primitive, part-object phantasies; and "the more disturbed the group, the more easily discernible are these primitive phantasies and mechanisms". Such phantasies would prove the main focus of Bion's interest after his second analysis.

== Bion on thinking ==
"During the 1950s and 1960s, Bion transformed Melanie Klein's theories of infantile phantasy...into an epistemological "theory of thinking" of his own." Bion used as his starting point the phenomenology of the analytic hour, highlighting the two principles of "the emergence of truth and mental growth. The mind grows through exposure to truth." The foundation for both mental development and truth are, for Bion, emotional experience.

The evolution of emotional experience into the capacity for thought, and the potential derailment of this process, are the primary phenomena described in Bion's model. Through his hypothesized alpha and beta elements, Bion provides a language to help one think about what is occurring during the analytic hour. These tools are intended for use outside the hour in the clinician's reflective process. To attempt to apply his models during the analytic session violates the basic principle whereby "Bion had advocated starting every session 'without memory, desire or understanding'—his antidote to those intrusive influences that otherwise threaten to distort the analytic process."

=== Alpha elements, beta elements, and alpha function ===
Bion created a theory of thinking based on changing "beta" (β) elements into "alpha" (α) ones. In his model, beta elements are unmetabolized aspects of psychic, somatic, or affective experience, and alpha elements are thoughts that can be thought by the thinker. The concept of beta elements stemmed from the "basic assumptions" identified in Bion's work with groups: "[T]he fundamental anxieties that underlie the basic assumption group resistances were originally thought of as proto-mental phenomena...forerunners of Bion's later concept of beta-elements." They were equally conceptual developments from his work on projective identification—from the "minutely split 'particles'" Bion saw as expelled in pathological projective identification by the psychotic, who would then go on to "lodge them in the angry, so-called bizarre objects by which he feels persecuted and controlled". For "these raw bits of experience he called beta-elements...to be actively handled and made use of by the mind they must, through what Bion calls alpha-functions, become alpha-elements".

β elements, α elements and α function are elements that Bion (1963) hypothesizes. He does not consider β-elements, α- elements, nor α function to actually exist. The terms are instead tools for thinking about what is being observed. They are elements whose qualities remain unsaturated, meaning we cannot know the full extent or scope of their meaning, so they are intended as tools for thought rather than real things to be accepted at face value (1962, p. 3).

Bion took for granted that the infant requires a mind to help it tolerate and organize experience. For Bion, thoughts exist prior to the development of an apparatus for thinking. The apparatus for thinking, the capacity to have thoughts "has to be called into existence to cope with thoughts" (1967, p. 111).

To learn from experience, alpha-function must operate on the awareness of the emotional experience; alpha–elements are produced from the impressions of the experience; these are thus made storable and available for dream thoughts and for unconscious waking thinking... If there are only beta-elements, which cannot be made unconscious, there can be no repression, suppression, or learning. (Bion, 1962, p. 8)

α-function works upon undigested facts, impressions, and sensations, that cannot be mentalized—beta-elements. α-function digests β-elements, making them available for thought (1962, pp. 6–7).

Beta-elements are not amenable to use in dream thoughts but are suited for use in projective identification. They are influential in producing acting out. These are objects that can be evacuated or used for a kind of thinking that depends on manipulation of what are felt to be things in themselves as if to substitute such manipulations for words or ideas... Alpha-function transforms sense impressions into alpha-elements which resemble, and may in fact be identical with, the visual images with which we are familiar in dreams, namely, the elements that Freud regards as yielding their latent content when the analyst has interpreted them. Failure of alpha-function means the patient cannot dream and therefore cannot sleep. As alpha-function makes the sense impressions of the emotional experience available for conscious and dream—thought the patient who cannot dream cannot go to sleep and cannot wake up. (1962, pp. 6–7)

=== Bizarre object ===
Bizarre objects, according to Bion, are impressions of external objects which, by way of projective identification, form a "screen" that's imbued with characteristics of the subject's own personality; they form part of his interpretation of object relations theory. Bion saw psychotic attacks on the normal linking between objects as producing a fractured world, where the patient felt themselves surrounded by hostile bizarre objects—the by-products of the broken linkages. Such objects, with their superego components, blur the boundary of internal and external, and impose a kind of externalised moralism on their victims. They can also contain ego-functions that have been evacuated from the self as part of the defence against thinking, sensing, and coming to terms with reality: thus a man may feel watched by his telephone, or that the music player being listened to is in fact listening to him in turn.

==== Later developments ====
Hanna Segal considered bizarre objects more difficult to re-internalise than either good or bad objects due to their splintered state: grouped together in a mass or psychic gang, their threatening properties may contribute to agoraphobia.

=== Knowledge, love and hate ===
Successful application of alpha-function leads to "the capacity to tolerate the actual frustration involved in learning ("K") that [Bion] calls 'learning from experience'". The opposite of knowledge "K" was what Bion termed "−K": "the process that strips, denudes, and devalues persons, experiences, and ideas."

Both K and −K interact for Bion with Love and Hate, as links within the analytic relationship. "The complexities of the emotional link, whether Love or Hate or Knowledge [L, H, and K – the Bionic relational triad]" produce ever-changing "atmospheric" effects in the analytic situation. The patient's focus may wish to be "on Love and Hate (L and H) rather than the knowledge (K) that is properly at stake in psychoanalytic inquiry."

For Bion, "knowledge is not a thing we have, but a link between ourselves and what we know ... K is being willing to know but not insisting on knowledge." By contrast, -K is "not just ignorance but the active avoidance of knowledge, or even the wish to destroy the capacity for it" – and "enacts what 'Attacks on Linking' identifies as hatred of emotion, hatred of reality, hatred of life itself."

Looking for the source of such hate (H), Bion notes in Learning from Experience that, "Inevitably one wonders at various points in the investigation why such a phenomenon as that represented by −K should exist. ... I shall consider one factor only – Envy. By this term I mean the phenomenon described by Melanie Klein in Envy and Gratitude" (1962, p. 96).

=== Reversible perspective and −K ===
"Reversible Perspective" was a term coined by Bion to illuminate "a peculiar and deadly form of analytic impasse which defends against psychic pain". It represents the clash of "two independently experienced views or phenomena whose meanings are incompatible". In Bion's own words, "Reversible perspective is evidence of pain; the patient reverses perspective so as to make a dynamic situation static."

As summarised by Etchegoyen, "Reversible perspective is an extreme case of rigidity of thought. ... As Bion says, what is most characteristic in such cases is the manifest accord and the latent discord." In clinical contexts, what may happen is that the analyst's "interpretation is accepted, but the premises have been rejected ... the actual specificity, the substance of the interpretation". Reversible perspective is an aspect of "the potential destruction and deformation of knowledge" – one of the attacks on linking of −K.

=== O: The ineffable ===
As his thought continued to develop, Bion came to use Negative Capability and the suspension of Memory and Desire in his work as an analyst, in order to investigate psychic reality - which he regarded as essentially 'non-sensuous' (1970). Following his 1965 book Transformations he had an increasing interest in what he termed the domain of "O" – the unknowable, or ultimate Truth. "In aesthetics, Bion has been described as a neo-Kantian for whom reality, or the thing-in-itself (O), cannot be known, only be "be-ed" (1965). What can be known is said by Bion to be in the realm of K, impinging through its sensory channels.

Bion would speak of "an intense catastrophic emotional explosion O," which could only be known through its aftereffects. Where before he had privileged the domain of knowledge (K), now he would speak as well of "resistance to the shift from transformations involving K (knowledge) to transformations involving O ... resistance to the unknowable". Hence his injunctions to the analyst to eschew memory and desire, to "bring to bear a diminution of the 'light' – a penetrating beam of darkness; a reciprocal of the searchlight. If any object existed, however faint, it would show up very clearly". In stating this he was making connections to Freud, who in a letter to Lou Andreas Salome had referred to a mental counterpart of scotopic, "mole like vision", used to gain impressions of the Unconscious. He was also making links with the apophatic method used by contemplative thinkers such as St. John of the Cross, a writer quoted many times by Bion. Bion was well aware that our perception and our attention often blind us to what genuinely and strikingly is new in every moment.

== Containment theory ==
Bion's concept of containment, first developed in his 1962 book Learning from Experience, represents one of his most significant contributions to psychoanalytic theory. The theory describes a psychological process whereby one person (the container) receives and processes the unbearable feelings and experiences of another (the contained).

=== Origins and development ===
The containment model emerged from Bion's observations of the mother-infant relationship and his clinical work with psychotic patients. Drawing on Melanie Klein's concept of projective identification, Bion expanded it from a defensive mechanism to a communicative process essential for psychological development. He proposed that the mother serves as a psychological "container" for the infant's primitive anxieties and unprocessed emotional experiences (which he termed "beta elements"). Bion used the notation "♀︎♂︎" to represent the container–contained relationship, describing the dynamic interplay between:

- The container (♀︎) which receives, holds, and processes
- The contained (♂︎) which is projected, held, and transformed

=== Maternal reverie and alpha function ===
Central to containment theory is Bion's concept of "maternal reverie," which describes the mother's receptive state of mind that allows her to receive the infant's projections. Through what Bion termed "alpha function," the mother processes the infant's raw sensory data and emotional experiences (beta elements) into manageable, thinkable forms (alpha elements) that can be re-introjected by the infant. Failure of adequate containment may lead to what Bion described as "nameless dread" – primitive anxieties that cannot be processed or thought about.

==== Application to psychoanalysis ====
In clinical practice, the analyst functions as a container for the patient's unbearable emotions and experiences. Bion emphasized that this process requires the analyst to maintain a state of mind free from "memory and desire" to fully receive the patient's projections. Through containment, patients gradually develop their own capacity to contain and process difficult emotional experiences.

== Late Bion ==
"For the later Bion, the psychoanalytic encounter was itself a site of turbulence, 'a mental space for further ideas which may yet be developed'." In his unorthodox quest to maintain such "mental space", Bion "spent the final years of his long and distinguished professional life [writing] a futuristic trilogy in which he is answerable to no one but himself, A Memoir of the Future."

If we accept that "Bion introduced a new form of pedagogy in his writings...[via] the density and non-linearity of his prose", it comes perhaps to a peak here in what he himself termed "a fictitious account of psychoanalysis including an artificially constructed dream ... science fiction". We may conclude at least that he achieved his stated goal therein: "To prevent someone who KNOWS from filling the empty space".

== Bibliography ==
- Bion, W.R. (1940). The war of nerves. In Miller and Crichton-Miller (Eds.), The Neuroses in War (pp. 180 – 200). London: Macmillan, 1940.
- Bion, W.R. (1943). Intra-group tensions in therapy, Lancet 2: 678/781 - 27 Nov. 1943, in Experiences in Groups (1961).
- Bion, W. R.(1946). Leaderless group project, Bulletin of the Menninger Clinic, 10: 77–81.
- Bion, W. R. (1948a). Psychiatry in a time of crisis, British Journal of Medical Psychology, vol.XXI.
- Bion, W. R. (1948b). Experiences in groups, Human Relations, vols. I-IV, 1948–1951, Reprinted in Experiences in Groups (1961).
- Bion, W. R. (1950). The imaginary twin, read to the British Psychoanalytical Society, 1 Nov. 1950. In Second Thoughts (1967).
- Bion, W. R. (1952). Group dynamics: a review. International Journal of Psycho-Analysis, vol. 33:, Reprinted in M. Klein, P. Heimann & R. Money-Kyrle (editors). New Directions in Psychoanalysis (pp. 440–477). Tavistock Publications, London, 1955. Reprinted in Experiences in Groups (1961).
- Bion, W. R. (1954). Notes on the theory of schizophrenia. Read in the Symposium "The Psychology of Schizophrenia" at the 18th International psycho-analytical congress, London, 1953 International Journal of Psycho-Analysis, vol. 35: Reprinted in Second Thoughts (1967).
- Bion, W. R. (1955a). The Development of Schizophrenic Thought, International Journal of Psycho-Analysis, vol. 37: Reprinted in Second Thoughts (1967).
- Bion, W. R. (1955b). Language and the schizophrenic, in M. Klein, P. Heimann and R. Money-Kyrle (editors). New Directions in Psychoanalysis (pp. 220 – 239).Tavistock Publications, London, 1955.
- Bion, W. R. (1957a). The differentiation of the psychotic from the non-psychotic personalities, International Journal of Psycho Analysis, vol. 38: Reprinted in Second Thoughts (1967).
- Bion, W. R. (1957b). On Arrogance, 20th International Congress of Psycho-Analysis, Paris, in Second Thoughts (1967).
- Bion, W. R. (1958). On Hallucination, International Journal of Psycho-Analysis, vol. 39, part 5: Reprinted in Second Thoughts (1967).
- Bion, W. R. (1959). Attacks on linking, International Journal of Psycho-Analysis, vol. 40: Reprinted in Second Thoughts (1967).
- Bion, W. R. (1961). Experiences in Groups, London: Tavistock.
- Bion, W. R. (1962a). A theory of thinking, International Journal of Psycho-Analysis, vol. 43: Reprinted in Second Thoughts (1967).
- Bion, W. R. (1962b). Learning from Experience, London: William Heinemann. [Reprinted London: Karnac Books,]. Reprinted in Seven Servants (1977e).
- Bion, W. R. (1963). Elements of Psycho-Analysis, London: William Heinemann. [Reprinted London: Karnac Books]. Reprinted in Seven Servants (1977e).
- Bion, W. R. (1965). Transformations. London: William Heinemann [Reprinted London: Karnac Books 1984]. Reprinted in Seven Servants (1977e).
- Bion, W. R. (1966). Catastrophic change, Bulletin of the British Psychoanalytical Society, 1966, N°5.
- Bion, W. R. (1967a). Second Thoughts, London: William Heinemann. [Reprinted London: Karnac Books 1984].
- Bion, W. R. (1967b). Notes on memory and desire, Psycho-analytic Forum, vol. II n° 3 (pp. 271 – 280). [reprinted in E. Bott Spillius (Ed.). Melanie Klein Today Vol. 2 Mainly Practice (pp. 17–21) London: Routledge 1988].
- Bion, W. R. (1970). Attention and Interpretation. London: Tavistock Publications. [Reprinted London: Karnac Books 1984]. Reprinted in Seven Servants (1977e).
- Bion, W.R. (1973). Bion's Brazilian Lectures 1. Rio de Janeiro: Imago Editora. [Reprinted in one volume London: Karnac Books 1990].
- Bion, W. R. (1974). Bion's Brazilian Lectures 2. Rio de Janeiro: Imago Editora. [Reprinted in one volume London: Karnac Books 1990].
- Bion, W.R. (1975). A Memoir of the Future, Book 1 The Dream. Rio de Janeiro: Imago Editora. [Reprinted in one volume with Books 2 and 3 and 'The Key' London: Karnac Books 1991].
- Bion, W. R. (1976a). Evidence. Bulletin British Psycho-Analytical Society N° 8, 1976. Reprinted in Clinical Seminars and Four Papers (1987).
- Bion, W.R. (1976b). Interview, with A.G.Banet jr., Group and Organisation Studies, vol. 1 No. 3 (pp. 268 – 285). September 1976.
- Bion, W.R. (1977a). A Memoir of the Future, Book 2 The Past Presented. Rio de Janeiro: Imago Editora. [Reprinted in one volume with Books 1 and 3 and 'The Key' London: Karnac Books 1991].
- Bion, W.R. (1977b). Two Papers: The Grid and Caesura. Rio de Janeiro: Imago Editora. [Reprinted London: Karnac Books 1989].
- Bion, W. R. (1977c). On a Quotation from Freud, in Borderline Personality Disorders, New York: International University Press. Reprinted in Clinical Seminars and Four Papers(1987). [Reprinted in Clinical Seminars and Other Works. London: Karnac Books, 1994].
- Bion, W. R. (1977d). Emotional Turbulence, in Borderline Personality Disorders, New York: International University Press. Reprinted in Clinical Seminars and Four Papers(1987). [Reprinted in Clinical Seminars and Other Works. London: Karnac Books, 1994].
- Bion, W. R. (1977e). Seven Servants. New York: Jason Aronson inc. (includes Elements of Psychoanalysis, Learning from Experience, Transformations, Attention and Interpretation).
- Bion, W.R. (1978). Four Discussions with W.R. Bion. Perthshire: Clunie Press. [Reprinted in Clinical Seminars and Other Works. London: Karnac Books, 1994].
- Bion, W.R. (1979a). Making the best of a Bad Job. Bulletin British Psycho-Analytical Society, February 1979. Reprinted in Clinical Seminars and Four Papers (1987). [Reprinted in Clinical Seminars and Other Works. London: Karnac Books, 1994].
- Bion, W.R. (1979b). A Memoir of the Future, Book 3 The Dawn of Oblivion. Perthshire: Clunie Press. [Reprinted in one volume with Books 1 and 2 and 'The Key' London: Karnac Books 1991].
- Bion, W.R. (1980). Bion in New York and São Paulo. (Edited by F.Bion). Perthshire: Clunie Press.
- Bion, W.R. (1981). A Key to A Memoir of the Future. (Edited by F.Bion). Perthshire: Clunie Press. [Reprinted in one volume London: Karnac Books 1991].
- Bion, W.R. (1982). The Long Weekend: 1897-1919 (Part of a Life). (Edited by F.Bion). Abingdon: The Fleetwood Press.
- Bion, W.R. (1985). All My Sins Remembered (Another part of a Life) and The Other Side of Genius: Family Letters. (Edited by F.Bion). Abingdon: The Fleetwood Press.
- Bion, W.R. (1985). Seminari Italiani. (Edited by F.Bion). Roma: Borla.
- Bion, W.R. (1987). Clinical Seminars and Four Papers, (Edited by F.Bion). Abingdon: Fleetwood Press. [Reprinted in Clinical Seminars and Other Works. London: Karnac Books, 1994].
- Bion, W.R. (1992). Cogitations. (Edited by F.Bion). London: Karnac Books.
- Bion, W.R. (1997a). Taming Wild Thoughts. (Edited by F.Bion). London: Karnac Books.
- Bion, W.R. (1997b). War Memoirs 1917 - 1919. (Edited by F.Bion). London: Karnac Books.
- Bion, Wilfred R (1999). Seminar held in Paris, 10 July 1978. Transcribed by Francesca Bion Sept
- Bion, Wilfred R (2014). The Complete Works of W. R. Bion. Edited by Mawson, C. (2014). Karnac Books, London. 16 Volumes

== See also ==
- Ernest Jones
- Henry Ezriel
- Ignacio Matte Blanco
- Melanie Klein
- Donald Winnicott
- Negative capability
- Object relations theory
- Paranoid anxiety
- Projective identification
- Socio-analysis
- Tavistock Institute
- Unthought known
- Donald Meltzer
- Ideas of reference
- Sexual fetishism
- Surrealism
