= Quality investing =

Investment strategy

Quality investing is an investment strategy based on a set of clearly defined fundamental criteria that seeks to identify companies with outstanding quality characteristics. The quality assessment is made based on soft (e.g. management credibility) and hard criteria (e.g. balance sheet stability). Quality investing supports best overall rather than best-in-class approach.

== History ==
The idea for quality investing originated in the bond and real estate investing, where both the quality and price of potential investments are determined by ratings and expert attestations. Later the concept was applied to investments in enterprises in equity markets.

Benjamin Graham, the founding father of value investing, was the first to recognize the quality problem among equities back in the 1930s. Graham classified stocks as either Quality or Low Quality. He also observed that the greatest losses result not from buying quality at an excessively high price, but from buying Low Quality at a price that seems good value. Warren Buffett said that one wants to buy companies that can be run by idiots, because some day they will be.

The quality issue in a corporate context attracted particular attention in the management economics literature following the development of the BCG matrix in 1970. Using the two specific dimensions of life cycle and the experience curve concept, the matrix allocates a company's products – and even companies themselves – to one of two quality classes (Cash Cows and Stars) or two Non-quality classes (Question Marks and Dogs). Other important works on quality of corporate business can be found primarily among the US management literature. These include, for example, "In Search of Excellence" by Thomas Peters and Robert Waterman, "Competitive Advantage" by Michael Porter, " Built to Last" by Jim Collins and Jerry Porras, and "Good to Great" by Jim Collins. and "Quality Investing" by Lawrence Cunningham

Quality investing gained credence in particular after the burst of the Dot-com bubble in 2001 when investors witnessed the spectacular failures of companies such as Enron and Worldcom. These corporate collapses focused investors’ awareness on quality, which may vary from stock to stock. Investors started to pay more attention to quality of balance sheet, earnings quality, information transparency, and corporate governance quality.

== Identification of quality ==
As a rule, systematic quality investors identify quality stocks using a defined set of criteria that they have generally developed themselves and revise continually. Selection criteria that demonstrably influence and/or explain a company's business success or otherwise can be broken down into five categories:

- Market positioning: quality company possesses an economic moat, which distinguishes it from peers and allows to conquer leading market position. The company operates in the industry which offers certain growth potential and has global trends (e.g. ageing population for pharmaceuticals industry) as tailwinds.
- Business model: According to the BCG matrix, the business model of a quality company is usually classified as star (growing business model, large capex) or cash cow (established business model, ample cash flows, attractive dividend yield). Having a competitive advantage, quality company offers good product portfolio, well-established value chain and wide geographical span.
- Corporate governance: Evaluation of corporate management execution is mainly based on soft-criteria assessment. Quality company has professional management, which is limited in headcount (6-8 members in top management) and has a low turnover rate. Its corporate governance structure is transparent, plausible and accordingly organized.
- Financial strength: Solid balance sheet, high capital and sales profitability, ability to generate ample cash flows are key attributes of quality company. Quality company tends to demonstrate positive financial momentum for several years in a row. Earnings are of high quality, with operating cash flows exceeding net income, inventories and accounts receivables not growing faster than sales etc.
- Attractive valuation: Valuation ultimately is related to quality, which is similar to investments in real estate. Attractive valuation, which is defined by high discounted cash flow (DCF), low P/E ratio and P/B ratio, becomes an important factor in quality investing process.

According to a number of studies the company can sustain its quality for about 11 months in average, which means that quantitative and qualitative monitoring of the company is done systematically.

== Comparison to other investment models ==
Quality investing is an investment style that can be viewed independent of value investing and growth investing. A quality portfolio may therefore also contain stocks with Growth and Value attributes.

Nowadays, Value Investing is based first and foremost on stock valuation. Certain valuation coefficients, such as the price/earnings and price/book ratios, are key elements here. Value is defined either by valuation level relative to the overall market or to the sector, or as the opposite of Growth. An analysis of the company's fundamentals is therefore secondary. Consequently, a Value investor will buy a company's stock because he believes that it is undervalued and that the company is a good one. A quality investor, meanwhile, will buy a company's stock because it is an excellent company that is also attractively valued.

Modern Growth Investing centers primarily on Growth stocks. The investor's decision rests equally on experts' profit forecasts and the company's earnings per share. Only stocks that are believed to generate high future profits and a strong growth in earnings per share are admitted to a Growth investor's portfolio. The share price at which these anticipated profits are bought, and the fundamental basis for growth, are secondary considerations. Growth investors thus focus on stocks exhibiting strong earnings expansion and high profit expectations, regardless of their valuation. Quality investors, meanwhile, favor stocks whose high earnings growth is rooted in a sound fundamental basis and whose price is justified.

== See also ==
- Value investing
- Growth investing
