= McKinsey 7S Framework =

Management model

Visual representation of the model

The McKinsey 7S Framework is a management model developed by business consultants Robert H. Waterman, Jr. and Tom Peters (who also developed the MBWA motif, "Management By Walking Around", and authored In Search of Excellence) in the 1980s. This was a strategic vision for groups, to include businesses, business units, and teams. The 7 S's are structure, strategy, systems, skills, style, staff and shared values.

The model is most often used as an organizational analysis tool to assess and monitor changes in the internal situation of an organization.

The model is based on the theory that, for an organization to perform well, these seven elements need to be aligned and mutually reinforcing. So, the model can be used to help identify what needs to be realigned to improve performance, or to maintain alignment (and performance) during other types of change.

Whatever the type of change – restructuring, new processes, organizational merger, new systems, change of leadership, and so on – the model can be used to understand how the organizational elements are interrelated, and so ensure that the wider impact of changes made in one area is taken into consideration.

== Name ==
Whilst the terms "7S Framework" or "7S Model" are often used, Dagmar Recklies notes that the model is better known with its "McKinsey" association, because Peters and Waterman were based with McKinsey & Co when they developed their model.

== History ==
In 1977, McKinsey director Ron Daniel launched two projects. The first and major one, the Business Strategy project, was allocated to top consultants at McKinsey's New York City headquarters and was given significant resources. It was headed by Frederick Gluck, and despite promise, the project could not manage to effectively implement the new strategies. The second project was related to the problem of implementation: organizational effectiveness. This project was headed by Cleveland-based James Bennet.

Peters states that directly after graduating with a PhD from Stanford and returning to McKinsey, Daniel handed him a "fascinating assignment". Motivated by the new ideas coming from Bruce Henderson's Boston Consulting Group, Peters "was asked [by Daniel] to look at 'organization effectiveness' and 'implementation issues' in an inconsequential offshoot project nested in McKinsey's rather offbeat San Francisco office". While Daniel's first project was focused on Business Strategy, this second project was concerned with "Organization", which Peters defined as involving "the structure-and-people side". The "Organization" project was seen by Peters to be less important, according to Peters in a Fast Company interview.

Despite being described as "marginal", the project "had an infinite travel budget that allowed [Peters] to fly first-class and stay at top-notch hotels, and a license from McKinsey to talk to as many cool people as [he] could all around the United States and the world". Peters admits that "There was no carefully designed work plan. There was no theory that I was out to prove. I went out and talked to genuinely smart, remarkably interesting, first-rate people." In addition to Karl Weick and Einar Thorsrud, Peters notes that Douglas McGregor's theory of motivation, known as Theory X and Theory Y, was directly influential on the direction of the project.

In a 1978 article, "Symbols, Patterns and Settings", Peters argued that "shifting organizational structure" and "inventing new processes" – structure and system, respectively – were only two tools of organizational change. Peters then outlined eight "mundane" tools that every manager has at their fingertips. He described this article as a "tentative presentation" and "the first public expression of these ideas."

In 1979, McKinsey's Munich office requested Peters to present his findings to Siemens. That provided the spur for Peters to create a 700-slide two-day presentation. Word of the meeting reached the US and Peters was invited to present also to PepsiCo. However, unlike the hyper-organised Siemens, the PepsiCo management required a tighter format than 700 slides, so Tom Peters consolidated the presentation into eight themes. Each of these eight would form a chapter of In Search of Excellence.

In 1980, Waterman joined Peters, and, along with Waterman's friend Tony Athos and Richard Pascale – both academics – came together at a two-day retreat in San Francisco to develop what would become known as the 7S Framework, the same framework that would organize In Search of Excellence. In June 1980, Peters published an op-ed in the Manager's Journal section of the Wall Street Journal titled "The Planning Fetish". In this article, he "stressed the importance of execution and dismissed the whole idea of strategy." As strategy was McKinsey's main operation at the time, this was seen as a "frontal assault" on the company, leading Mike Bulkin, the head of the New York office, to demand that Daniel fire Peters.

The primary "innovative" theme that undergirded what would become the well-known book In Search of Excellence book was that "structure is not organization". This also happened to be the title of a 1980 journal article authored by Bob Waterman, Tom Peters, and Julien Phillips in which they argue that the "picture of the thing is not the thing.... An organizational structure is not an organization." This article also introduced what would become the McKinsey 7S Framework.

=== In Search of Excellence ===
The work of Peters, Waterman, Athos, and Pascale leading up to the widely successful In Search of Excellence, not only elaborated the eight themes that would form each chapter, but also the 7 S's frame the different ways in which the firms profiled in the book were "excellent."

=== The Art of Japanese Management ===
Athos and Pascale, although not named as co-authors of the 1982 publication of In Search of Excellence, published their own study in a 1981 book titled The Art of Japanese Management. This book used the 7S Framework to compare the Japanese firm Matsushita with the American company ITT. Just as Peters emphasized throughout his writing, the important distinction between American and Japanese management was not the so-called "hard" technical aspects of organization, but rather the "soft" cultural aspects.

== Objective ==
The framework aims to analyze how well an organization is positioned to achieve its intended objective. Its central premise is that organisation is not determined by structure alone, but six other factors all need to be considered. Among these seven "interdependent elements", three "hard" elements are considered easily identifiable, while four "soft" elements are harder to describe.

The basic premise of the model is that there are seven internal aspects of an organization that need to be aligned if it is to be successful:

Hard Elements

- Strategy - Strategy is defined as the set of actions that a firm plans in response to or anticipation of changes to its external environment. These actions allow a firm to improve its competitive positioning. Purpose of the business and the way the organization seeks to enhance its competitive advantage.
- Structure – Structure allows the firm to focus on areas that are deemed important for its evolution. This includes division of activities, integration and coordination mechanisms.
- Systems – These include formal and informal procedures for measurement, reward and resource allocation.

Soft Elements

- Shared Values – These values define the firm's key beliefs and aspirations that form the core of its corporate culture. Shared values are considered central because they influence and shape the organisation's culture, impacting how individuals within the organisation behave and make decisions.
- Skills – The organization's core competencies and distinctive capabilities. It is argued that old skills can often act as a hindrance in developing new skills.
- Staff – Staff considers people as a pool of resources, which need to be nurtured, developed, guarded, and allocated. It includes organization's human resources, demographic, educational and attitudinal characteristics.
- Style – Typical behaviour patterns of key groups, such as CEOs, managers, and other professionals.

== Usage ==
- Improve the performance of a company
- Examine the likely effects of future changes within a company
- Align departments and processes during a merger or acquisition
- Determine how best to implement a proposed strategy
