= Barnewall Two-way Model =

The Barnewall Two-way Model, also known as the Barnewall Two-way Behavioral Model, is an investor psychographic profiling model.

The Barnewall Two-way model was initially conceptualized and proposed by Marilyn MacGruder Barnewall in 1987 in an academic paper titled Psychological Characteristics of the individual investor. The model classifies and distinguishes investors mainly into two main broad categories: passive investors and active investors.

== See also ==
- Bielard, Biehl and Kaiser five-way model
- Behavioral economics
- Investor profile
