= Selling Blue Elephants =

2007 book

Selling Blue Elephants: How to Make Great Products That People Want Before They Even Know They Want Them
- Selling Blue Elephants: How to Make Great Products That People Want Before They Even Know They Want Them
- Author: Howard Moskowitz, Alex Gofman
- Language: English
- Genre: Marketing
- Publisher: Wharton School Publishing
- Publication date: April 11, 2007
- Publication place: United States
- Media type: Print (Hardback)
- Pages: 272 p.
- ISBN: 0-13-613668-0
- OCLC: 76786794
- Dewey Decimal: 658.8 22
- LC Class: HF5415.153 .M68 2007

Selling Blue Elephants: How to Make Great Products That People Want Before They Even Know They Want Them is a book written by Howard Moskowitz and Alex Gofman (Publisher: Wharton School Publishing 2007).

The book outlines a new solution-oriented learning experience co-developed with Prof. Jerry (Yoram) Wind of Wharton School of Business - Rule Developing Experimentation (RDE).

RDE is the systematized process of designing, testing and modifying alternative ideas, packages, products, or services in a disciplined way so that the developer and marketer discover what appeals to the customer, even if the customer can't articulate the need, much less the solution. The book describes best practices in the RDE from some of today's top companies: HP, Prego, Vlasic, MasterCard and others. Filled with real-life stories, this book changes the way people think about selling to their present and future customers.
