= Merrelyn Emery =

Australian social scientist (1940–2026)

- Born: Merrelyn Burchett; 27 April 1940; Broken Hill, New South Wales, Australia
- Died: August 2026 (aged 86); Canberra, Australian Capital Territory, Australia
- Education: University of New England (BA, 1960; BA Hons, 1964), University of New South Wales (PhD, 1986)
- Known for: Open systems theory, Search Conference, Participative Design Workshop
- Partner: Fred Emery (died 1997)
- Scientific career
- Fields: Social science, organizational development
- Workplaces: Australian National University (1967–1997); Concordia University (adjunct)
- Website: www.socialsciencethatactuallyworks.com

Merrelyn Emery (27 April 1940 – August 2026) was an Australian social scientist known for her contributions to Open systems theory (OST) as a framework for organisational and community change. Her work included the two-stage model of active adaptation combining the Search Conference with the Participative Design Workshop and the systematisation of the Search Conference method in her 1982 monograph Searching, substantially revised in Searching: The theory and practice of making cultural change (1999).

== Early life and education ==
Merrelyn Emery was born on 27 April 1940 in Broken Hill, New South Wales, and grew up partly in Broken Hill and partly on an Aboriginal camp at Menindee on the Darling River. She completed a Bachelor of Arts in Psychology at University of New England, with first-class honours, in 1964. In 1986, she was awarded a PhD in marketing by the University of New South Wales for research on the neurophysiological effects of television viewing.

== Career ==
Emery worked as a part-time demonstrator and research assistant in psychology at the University of New England (1963–1965), and then at the Australian National University (ANU) from 1967. She joined the ANU's Centre for Continuing Education in 1970, as both a tutor and research assistant, and from 1976 to 1997 as a lecturer. It is here she and Fred Emery collaborated on the development of OST and its applied methodologies in Australia and internationally. She has held an adjunct position at the Department of Applied Human Sciences, Concordia University, in Montreal, and was an associate of the consultancy Amerin Pty Ltd.

In 2012, she delivered the W. Ross Ashby Memorial Lecture at the European Meetings on Cybernetics and Systems Research in Vienna, sponsored by the International Federation for Systems Research.

== Research ==
Emery's doctoral dissertation examined the impact of television viewing on children. Chris Mercogliano discusses her work in his 2004 book Teaching the Restless in which he notes Emery noted the absence of research in the area, leading her status as a 'leading expert in the field. Emery's work further showed that children are not equally susceptible to issues with exposure to television, and it was the act of watching television and not its content that was problematic.

Emery's later research and consulting work focused on Open Systems Theory as developed at the Tavistock Institute in the 1950s and 1960s and extended in Australia from 1969 onward. Her contributions span methodology, theoretical development and applied research.

=== Search Conference and Participative Design Workshop ===
Emery systematised the Search Conference, which is a participative planning method originated by Fred Emery and Eric Trist at the Tavistock Institute in 1959, as a reliable method for organisational and community change. In his 1992 book, Marvin Ross Weisbord described her as 'an explorer who has influenced a generation of search managers'. Her 1982 monograph Searching: for New Directions, in New Ways, for New Times documented the method's design and management alongside anthropological evidence for participative-democratic structures in pre-industrial cultures. The book was substantially revised as Searching: The theory and practice of making cultural change (1999), which became the standard reference on the method in English. With Ronald E. Purser she also co-authored The Search Conference (1996). She edited the 1993 volume Participative Design for Participative Democracy, the definitive treatment of the Participative Design Workshop, and established variants of the workshop suited to different organisational contexts.

=== Two-stage model of active adaptation ===
Emery formulated the two-stage model that combines the Search Conference (for participative strategic planning) and an adapted version of the Participative Design Workshop (structural design) into a single methodology for what OST calls active adaptation. De Guerre and Deering describe the theoretical framework as incomplete until she developed the model, with earlier applications often failing at the implementation stage.

=== Systemic statistics ===
With Rossana Alvarez, Emery published in Systemic Practice and Action Research in 2000 the first quantitative analysis of an organisation-in-environment derived from qualitative Search Conference data, establishing a method for producing quantitative results from qualitative material without discarding context.

== Death ==
Emery died in Canberra in August 2026, at the age of 86.

== Selected publications ==
- Emery, F.; Emery, M. (1976). A Choice of Futures: To Enlighten or Inform. Leiden: Martinus Nijhoff. doi:10.1007/978-1-4684-6948-6
- Emery, M. (1982). Searching: for New Directions, in New Ways, for New Times. Canberra: Centre for Continuing Education, Australian National University. ISBN 0909850054
- Emery, M. (ed.) (1993). Participative Design for Participative Democracy. Revised and enlarged edition. Canberra: Centre for Continuing Education, Australian National University. ISBN 0958772835
- Emery, M.; Purser, R. E. (1996). The Search Conference: A Powerful Method for Planning Organizational Change and Community Action. San Francisco: Jossey-Bass. ISBN 9780787901929
- Emery, M. (1999). Searching: The theory and practice of making cultural change. Amsterdam: John Benjamins. ISBN 9789027217684
- Emery, M. (2000). "The Current Version of Emery's Open Systems Theory." Systemic Practice and Action Research 13(5), 623–643. doi:10.1023/A:1009577509972
- Baburoglu, O. N.; Emery, M. (eds.) (2000). Educational Futures: Shifting Paradigm of Universities and Education. Istanbul: Sabanci Universitesi.
- Emery, M. (2006). Future of Schools: How Communities and Staff can Transform their School Districts. Lanham, MD: Rowman & Littlefield Education.
- Emery, M. (2010). "Refutation of Kira and van Eijnatten's critique of the Emerys' open systems theory." Systems Research and Behavioral Science 27(6), 701–710. doi:10.1002/sres.1010
- Emery, M. (2014). "Better late than never: Open systems theory's plan to deal with climate change." In G. S. Metcalf (ed.), Social Systems and Design. Tokyo: Springer, 185–211. doi:10.1007/978-4-431-54478-4_8
- Emery, M. (2021). Did 9/11 change the world? Tracking the future.
- Emery, M. (2026). An Open Systems Science. Self-published, www.socialsciencethatactuallyworks.com.
