= James C. Collins =

American business consultant and writer

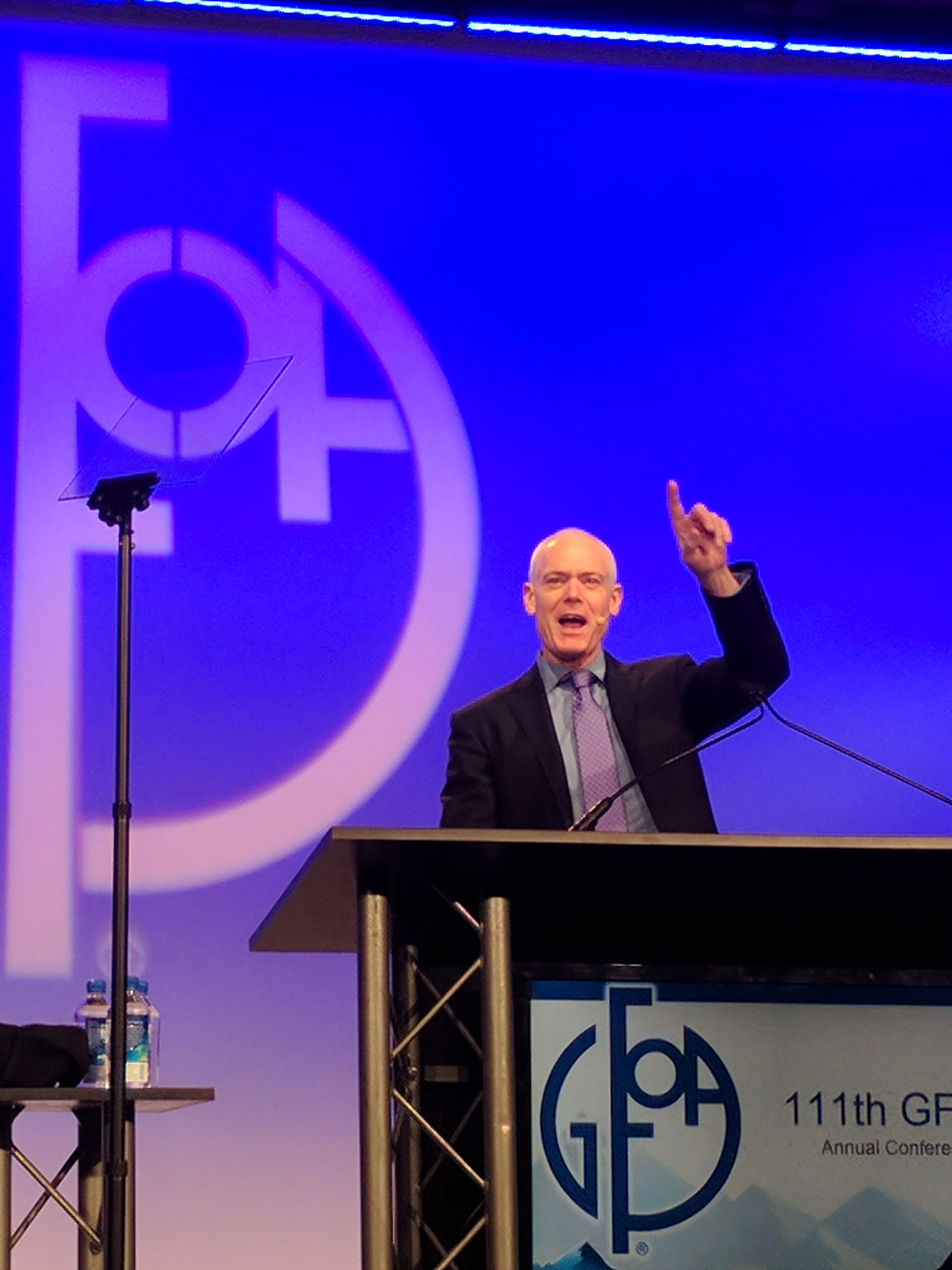
- James C. Collins speaking in Denver, Colorado (May 2017)
- Born: January 25, 1958 (age 68); Aurora, Colorado
- Education: Stanford University (BA, MBA)
- Occupation: Author
- Spouse: Joanne Ernst
- Website: jimcollins.com

James C. Collins (born 1958) is an American researcher, author, speaker and consultant focused on business management and company sustainability and growth.

== Early life and education ==
Collins received a BS in Mathematical Sciences at Stanford University, graduating in 1980.

Collins was granted honorary doctoral degrees from the University of Colorado and the Peter F. Drucker Graduate School of Management at Claremont Graduate University.

== Career ==
Following graduation, Collins spent 18 months in McKinsey & Co.'s San Francisco office. He was exposed to what may have been an influential project for him – two partners at McKinsey, Tom Peters and Robert Waterman, were running a McKinsey research project that later became the best-seller In Search of Excellence.

After his time at McKinsey, he returned to study at Stanford, graduating with an MBA from the Stanford Graduate School of Business in 1983. He then worked as a product manager for Hewlett-Packard for 18 months.

Collins began his research and teaching career on the faculty of Stanford University's Graduate School of Business in 1988. In 1992, he received the Distinguished Teaching Award.

He published his first book, Beyond Entrepreneurship: Turning Your Business into an Enduring Great Company co-authored with William C. Lazier, in 1992.

He published his first best-seller Built To Last, co-authored with Jerry Porras, in 1994.

In 1995, he founded a management laboratory in Boulder, Colorado, where he now conducts research and teaches executives from the corporate and social sectors. During that time, Collins has served as a senior executive at CNN International, and also worked with social sector organizations, such as: Johns Hopkins School of Medicine, the Girl Scouts of the USA, the Leadership Network of Churches, the American Association of K-12 School Superintendents, and the United States Marine Corps.

== Personal life ==
Collins is married to former triathlete and 1985 Ironman World Championship winner, Joanne Ernst.

== Publications ==
Books

- 1992: Beyond Entrepreneurship: Turning Your Business into an Enduring Great Company by James C. Collins and William C. Lazier
- 1994: Built to Last: Successful Habits of Visionary Companies by James C. Collins and Jerry I. Porras
- 2001: Good to Great: Why Some Companies Make the Leap … And Others Don’t by James C. Collins
- 2005: Good to Great and the Social Sectors by James C. Collins
- 2009: How the Mighty Fall: And Why Some Companies Never Give In by James C. Collins
- 2011: Great By Choice by James C. Collins and Morten T. Hansen
- 2019: Turning the Flywheel: A Monograph to Accompany Good to Great by James C. Collins
- 2020: BE 2.0 (Beyond Entrepreneurship 2.0): Turning Your Business into an Enduring Great Company by James C. Collins and William C. Lazier
- 2026: What to Make of a Life: Cliffs, Fog, Fire and the Self-Knowledge Imperative by Jim Collins
