= The Halo Effect =

The halo effect is the tendency for positive impressions of a person, company, country, brand, or product in one area to positively influence one's opinion or feelings.

The Halo Effect or Halo Effect may also refer to:

- The Halo Effect (band), a Swedish melodic death metal band
- The Halo Effect (book), a 2007 book by Phil Rosenzweig
- "Halo Effect", a song by Rush from the 2012 album Clockwork Angels
