= Hans Jacob Arnold Kreyberg =

Norwegian professor of economics

Hans Jacob Arnold Kreyberg (November 24. 1924 - June 5. 1983) was a Norwegian professor of economics. He was born at Levanger, grew up in Oslo and spent the first part of the Second World War in the USA where he graduated from Riverdale before entering the Norwegian medical corps alongside his father Leiv Kreyberg.

In 1951, he received a degree in economics at The University of Oslo, and until 1959 held a scholarship with a special interest in Keynes' economics working with Ragnar Frisch and Trygve Haavelmo, to be known as "the Oslo School". In 1961 he published an overview of the Keynes' models which was republished in 1972 with a preface by Ragnar Frisch. In 1956 he received the King's Gold Medal for a paper outlining basic economic and social ideas as expressed through a demand for a strong activation of our country's natural resources. Two radio lectures were published in 1959 and republished in 2011.

In 1959 he came as deputy manager to the Department of economics at The Norwegian Institute of Technology (NTH) in Trondheim and was docent from 1962 with a special interest in operational analysis (OR). He spent a year as visiting professor after invitation from The University of Minnesota in 1963/64. In 1970 he received a PhD with the thesis "On the maximum principle of optimal control in economic processes" and became professor at The Norwegian Institute of Technology the same year.

He conducted student seminars at NTH examining the economy and administration of companies in relation to the society in general ("Samfunn og bedrift"), expanded the learning material for students in engineering, and contributed to the development of the degree dr. ing. (Doctor of Engineering) with a significant increase in candidates with this degree from NTH. He was also a member of the Norwegian Manager education council from 1971 and pioneered in establishing seminars in administrative leadership for industrial leaders in Norway in cooperation with Einar Thorsrud and others. He also contributed to the modelling of the long-term economic development in Norway in 1975 and was invited by the government in Costa Rica to help with their long-term economic planning in the 1970s.

Apart from a short stay as a statistician in Copenhagen's WHO office in 1951 he contributed during the 1950s and -60's to his father's work in establishing the causal connection between tobacco smoking and lung cancer at a population level.

Hans Jacob Kreyberg was active in several political movements, most importantly as leader of the Popular movement against Norwegian membership in the European Common Market (1970–77) in Sør-Trøndelag, and he served as a deputy to the Norwegian Parliament (1973–77) for the Socialist party.

He also held a membership in the Norwegian Research Council and as deputy to the Norwegian State Oil Company (Statoil) from 1974.

The Department of Economics where he served at NTH (1959–83) has since been integrated into the current Department of Industrial Economics and Technology Management under the Faculty of Economics and Management at NTNU.
