= Joanne Ernst =

American triathlete

Medal record

Women's triathlon

Representing United States

Ironman World Championship
Gold medal – first place	1985	Individual
Bronze medal – third place	1986	Individual

Joanne Ernst is an American former triathlete who won the 1985 Hawaii Ironman Triathlon.

== Results ==
Date	Position	Event	Swim time	Bike time	Run time	transition time	Total time
October 1985	1st	Ironman Triathlon, Hawaii	1:01:42	5:39:13	3:44:26		10:25:22
October 1986	3rd	Ironman Triathlon, Hawaii					10:00:07

== Family ==
Joanne Ernst is married to management consultant and writer Jim Collins. They have no children.
