= Nancy Austin =

American writer and business consultant

Nancy Kimball Austin
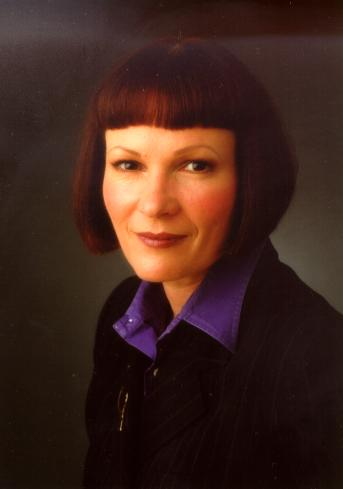
- Born: c. 1949; Portland, Oregon, United States
- Occupation: American writer

Nancy Kimball Austin (born c. 1949) is an American writer and business consultant, best known for co-writing the bestsellers A Passion for Excellence (1985) and The Assertive Woman (1975). Her books have sold approximately one million copies, and been published in seven languages.

== Biography ==
Austin was born c. 1949 in Portland, Oregon, the oldest of three children. Her parents were both from Seattle, Washington – her father was in mortgage banking, and her mother was a homemaker. Austin received a BA and 1977 MBA from UCLA, became a member of the Alpha Phi sorority , and was affiliated with the Neuropsychiatric Institute, where she was part of a team that was brought together to study and improve the community mental health system in California. She married Bill Cawley c.1975, becoming stepmother to his 8-year-old son, Jeff. 1975 was also the year that she wrote The Assertive Woman, which continues to be in print 30 years later. It has been translated into several languages, and sold approximately 420,000 copies.

She worked for four years at Hewlett Packard Company in Palo Alto, California, where she ran the company's management-development seminars. In 1983, she co-founded The Tom Peters Group, the Palo Alto-based consulting and research firm, and in 1985 she founded "Nancy K. Austin, Inc." in Northern California. In 1985, Austin and Peters wrote A Passion for Excellence, which soared to #1 on The New York Times bestseller list and sold more than 500,000 copies in its first six months.

Austin was also President of Not Just Another Publishing Company, a coach for managers and health-based practitioners, and a frequently-invited keynote speaker to international business conferences, speaking both to corporations and to government groups such as the United States Air Force. She has given hundreds of talks in the United States, Australia, Africa, Asia, Europe, and South America, and is a contributing editor to Working Woman and Inc. magazines.

She presently lives in Capitola, California with her husband and son.. She is also on the board of directors at Shakespeare Santa Cruz and Dominican Hospital in Santa Cruz.

== Publications ==
=== Books ===
- The Assertive Woman: A New Look (co-written with Stanlee Phelps)
  - June 1975, Price Stern Sloan
  - 1975, Impact Publishers. ISBN 0-915166-21-6
  - 1982, Impact Publishers. ASIN B00072QQRW
  - Revised edition, 1987, Impact Publishers. ISBN 0-915166-61-5
  - 3rd edition, June 1997, Impact Publishers. ISBN 1-886230-05-6
  - 4th edition, 2002, Impact Publishers. ISBN 1-886230-49-8
- A Passion for Excellence: The Leadership Difference, 1985 (co-written with Tom Peters)
  - April 1985, Random House. ISBN 0-394-54484-6
  - 1986, Warner Books. ISBN 0-446-38348-1
  - January 4, 1989 (reissue), Warner Books. ISBN 0-446-38639-1
  - May 31, 1994, Gardners Books, ISBN 1-86197-589-9

=== Selected articles ===
- Working Woman
  - November 1995, "Management's New Numbers Game"
  - March 1996, "Beyond the Trick Question"
- Inc. magazine
  - April 1997, "What Balance?"
  - May 1998, "Buzz"
  - October 1999, "Pure Internet Play"
- 1099
  - August 7, 2000 "Drum Machine" (about Michael Bayard)
  - List of all Austin's articles at 1099
- Incentive, "The Competitive Edge: Work-Life Paradox", September 1, 2004

== Sources ==
- AEI Speakers Bureau biography
- Professional Convention Management Association
- Speaking.com biography
- CNN, March 3, 2003, "Workaholics anonymous: The sweet science of slowing down" (Austin is quoted)
