= Positive deviance =

Approach to behavioral and social change

Positive deviance (PD) is an approach to behavioral and social change. It is based on the idea that, within a community, some individuals engage in unusual behaviors allowing them to solve problems better than others who face similar challenges, despite not having additional resources or knowledge. These individuals are referred to as positive deviants.

The concept first appeared in nutrition research in the 1970s. Researchers observed that, despite the poverty in a community, some families had well-nourished children. Some suggested using information gathered from these outliers to plan nutrition programs.

== Principles ==
Positive deviance is a strength-based approach applicable to problems requiring behavior and social change. It is based on the following principles:

- Communities already have the solutions; they are the best experts in solving their problems.
- Communities self-organize and are equipped with the human resources and social assets to solve agreed-upon problems.
- Collective intelligence. Intelligence and know-how are not concentrated in the leadership of a community alone or in external experts but are distributed throughout the community. Thus, the PD process aims to elicit collective intelligence to apply it to specific problems requiring behavior or social change.
- Sustainability is the cornerstone of the approach. The PD approach enables the community or organization to seek and discover sustainable solutions to a given problem because the demonstrably successful uncommon behaviors are already practiced in that community within the constraints and challenges of the current situation.
- It is easier to change behavior by practicing it rather than knowing about it. "It is easier to act your way into a new way of thinking than think your way into a new way of acting".

== Original application ==
The PD approach was first operationalized and applied in programming in the field by Jerry and Monique Sternin through their work with Save the Children in Vietnam in the 1990s (Tuhus-Dubrow, Sternin, Sternin and Pascale).

At the start of the pilot, 64% of children weighed in the pilot villages were malnourished. Through a PD inquiry, the villagers found poor peers in the community that, through their uncommon but successful strategies, had well-nourished children. These families collected foods typically considered inappropriate for children (e.g., sweet potato greens, shrimp, and crabs), washed their children's hands before meals, and actively fed them three to four times a day instead of the typical two meals a day provided to children.

Unknowingly, PDs had incorporated foods already found in their community that provided essential nutrients: protein, iron, and calcium. A nutrition program based on these insights was created. Instead of simply telling participants what to do differently, they designed the program to help them act their way into a new way of thinking. Parents were required to bring one of the newly identified foods to attend a feeding session. They brought their children and, while sharing nutritious meals, learned to cook the new foods.

At the end of the two-year pilot, malnutrition fell by 85%. Results were sustained and transferred to the participants' younger siblings.

This approach to programming was different in important ways. It is always appropriate, as it operates within the assets of a community, and it, therefore, caters to its specific cultural context, e.g., village, business, schools, ministry, department, or hospital. Additionally, by seeing that certain members of their community are already engaging in an uncommon behavior, others are more likely to adopt it themselves, as this serves as "social proof" that the behavior is acceptable for everyone within the community. Furthermore, the solutions stem from the community, avoiding thus the "immune response" that can occur when outside experts enter a community with best practices that are often unsuccessful in promoting sustained change. (Sternin)

Since it was first applied in Vietnam, PD has been used to inform nutrition programs in over 40 countries by USAID, World Vision, Mercy Corps, Save the Children, CARE, Plan International, Indonesian Ministry of Health, Peace Corps, Food for the Hungry, among others.

== Steps ==
A positive deviance approach may follow a series of steps.

=== An invitation to change ===
A PD inquiry begins with an invitation from a community that wishes to address a significant issue they face. This is crucial, as it is the community that acquires ownership of the process.

=== Defining the problem ===
The definition of the problem is carried out by and for the community. This will often lead to a problem definition that differs from the outside "expert" opinion of the situation. The community establishes a quantitative baseline, allowing it to reflect on the problem given the evidence at hand and measure the progress toward its goals. This is also the beginning of the process of identifying stakeholders and decision-makers involved. Additional stakeholders and decision-makers will be pulled in throughout the process as they are identified.

=== Determining the presence of PD individuals or groups ===
Using data and observation, the community can identify the positive deviants in their midst.

=== Discovering uncommon practices or behaviors ===
The Positive Deviance Inquiry aims to discover uncommon practices or behaviors. The community, having identified positive deviants, sets out to find the behaviors, attitudes, or beliefs that allow the PD to be successful. The focus is on the successful strategies of the PD, not on making a hero of the person using the strategy. This self-discovery of people/groups just like them who have found successful solutions provides "social proof" that this problem can be overcome now, without outside resources.

=== Program design ===
After identifying successful strategies, the community decides which strategies they would like to adopt, and they design activities to help others access and practice these uncommon and other beneficial strategies. Program design is not focused on spreading "best practices" but on helping community members "act their way into a new way of thinking" through hands-on activities.

=== Monitoring and evaluation ===
PD-informed projects are monitored and evaluated through a participatory process. As the community decides on and performs the monitoring, the tools they create will be appropriate to the setting. Even illiterate community members can participate through pictorial monitoring forms or other appropriate tools. Evaluation allows the community to track their progress toward their goals and reinforces the changes they are making in behaviors, attitudes, and beliefs.

=== Scaling up ===
The scaling up of a PD project may happen through many mechanisms: the "ripple effect" of other communities observing the success and engaging in a PD project of their own, through the coordination of NGOs, or organizational development consultants. Irrespective of the mechanism employed, the community discovery process of PDs in their midst remains vital to the acceptance of new behaviors, attitudes, and knowledge.

== Applications ==
=== Preventing hospital-acquired infections ===
The PD approach has been applied in hospitals in the United States, Brazil, Canada, Mexico, Colombia, and England to stop the spread of hospital-acquired infections such as Clostridioides difficile and Methicillin-resistant Staphylococcus aureus (MRSA). The Centers for Disease Control and Prevention (CDC) evaluated pilot programs in the U.S. and found units using the approach decreased their infections by 30-73%.

Additionally, it has been used in healthcare settings by increasing the incidence of hand washing and improving care for patients immediately after a heart attack.

=== Primary care (Bright Spotting) ===
Termed "Bright Spotting", instead of positive deviance, the primary care pilot initiative first took place in rural New Hampshire and is still ongoing. The outpatient clinic identified a complex patient population, from the clinic's perspective, studied the risk factors of that population, then identified measures that would signify that a patient has become healthy and sustained health. Once these measures were identified (using both data and the practices' knowledge of the patients), "Bright Spots" were identified as those that meet both high-risk criteria and achieved health. Finding positive deviant patients through predictive analytics has also been suggested as a possible tool in discovery. Once these patients were identified the care team performed qualitative research to discover their patterns of behavior. The results were then shown to the bright spots and their families who then designed a peer learning experience with the results in mind. The community meetings were then facilitated using both positive deviance facilitation techniques as well as applying the "Citizen Health Care Model", which is very similar to positive deviance approaches.

=== Public health ===
A PD project helped prisoners in a New South Wales prison stop smoking. Projects in Burkino Faso, Guatemala, Ivory Coast, and Rwanda addressed reproductive health in adolescents. PD maternal and newborn health projects in Myanmar, Pakistan, Egypt, and India have improved women's access to prenatal care, delivery preparation, and antenatal care for mothers and babies.

PD projects to prevent the spread of HIV/AIDS took place in 2002 with motorbike taxi drivers in Vietnam, and in 2004 with sex workers in Indonesia. A PD project to enhance psychological resilience amongst adolescents vulnerable to depression and anxiety was implemented in the Netherlands.

=== Child protection ===
A five-year PD project starting in 2003 to prevent girl trafficking in Indonesia with Save the Children and a local Indonesian NGO, helped them find viable economic options to stay in their communities.

A PD project to stop Female Genital Mutilation/Cutting in Egypt began in 1998 with CEDPA (Center for Development and Population Activities), COST (Coptic Organization for Services and Training), Caritas in Minya, Community Development Agency (CDA), Monshaat Nasser in Beni Suef governorate, and the Center for Women's Legal Assistance (CEWLA). Efforts have already shown a reduction in the practice.

In Uganda, a project with the Oak Foundation and Save the Children helped girls who were child soldiers with the Lords Resistance Army in Sudan reintegrate into their communities.

=== In education ===
PD projects in New Jersey, California, Argentina, Ethiopia, and Burkina Faso have addressed dropout rates and keeping girls in school.

=== Private sector ===
Proponents of PD within management science argue that, in any population (even in such seemingly mundane groups as service personnel in fast food environments), the positive deviants have attitudes, cognitive processes, and behavioral patterns that lead to significantly improved performance in key metrics such as speed of service and profitability. Studies claim that the widespread adoption of positive-deviant approaches consistently leads to significant performance improvement.

PD had been significantly extended to the private sector, by William Seidman and Michael McCauley. Their extensions include methodologies and technologies for:

- Quickly identifying the positive deviants
- Efficiently gathering and organizing the positive deviant knowledge
- Motivating a willingness in others to adopt the positive deviant approaches
- Sustaining the change by others by integrating it into their pre-existing emotional and cognitive functions
- Scaling the positive deviant knowledge to large numbers of people simultaneously

Positive deviance was further extended to groups or organizations by Gary Hamel. Hamel looks to Positive Deviant companies to set the example for "management innovation."

== See also ==
- Creativity
- Deviance (sociology)
- Individuality
- Invention
- Nonconformity
- Divergent thinking
- Outliers (book)
- Thinking outside the box
- Rebellious Motivational State
