= Fred Emery (psychologist) =

Australian psychologist (1925–1997)

- Born: Frederick Edmund Emery; 27 August 1925; Narrogin, Western Australia, Australia
- Died: 10 April 1997 (aged 71); Canberra, Australia
- Education: BSc Hons (Psychology), University of Western Australia, 1946; PhD (Psychology), University of Melbourne, 1953
- Occupations: Psychologist, academic

Frederick Edmund Emery (27 August 1925 – 10 April 1997) was an Australian psychologist and social scientist specialising in the field of organisational development, particularly in the theory of participative work design structures, such as self-managing teams.

== Life and career ==
Emery was born in Narrogin, Western Australia, and was the son of a drover. He was the Dux of Fremantle Boys' High in Western Australia at the age of 14. He earned his honours degree in science from the University of Western Australia in 1946 and joined the department's teaching staff in 1947. He subsequently spent nine years as staff of the Department of Psychology at the University of Melbourne, where he obtained his PhD in 1953. During 1951-1952, he held a UNESCO Fellowship in Social Sciences and was attached to the Tavistock Institute of Human Relations in the United Kingdom. As a staff member at the University of Melbourne, he made contributions to rural sociology, CPA, and the effects of film and television viewing.

In 1957, Emery left Australia for London to join the staff of the Tavistock Institute. He had previously worked with Eric Trist on sociotechnical systems while working as a UNESCO Research Fellow and published The Characteristics of Socio-technical Systems in 1959.

He, along with Trist and other colleagues, established "open sociotechnical systems theory" as an alternative paradigm for organisational design. They field-tested this on a national scale in Norway, in partnership with Einar Thorsrud.

After returning to Australia, Emery focused on developing a new method aimed at creating jointly optimised sociotechnical systems. This approach was designed to promote the diffusion of sociotechnical concepts rather than serve as an alternative to autocracy in the workplace. The method he developed in collaboration with Merrelyn Emery, known as the Participative Design Workshop, has been in use since 1971, replacing the previous 9-step method that had been used in Norway.

Sociotechnical systems are part of a broader theoretical framework known as Open Systems Theory (OST). Key publications by Emery and Trist include The Causal Texture of Organisational Environments (1965) and Towards a Social Ecology (1972). These works laid the foundations for Emery's development of OST.

Emery returned to Australia in 1969 and enrolled at the Australian National University (ANU). He served as a senior research fellow until November 1979, initially in the Department of Sociology (RSSS) and later, from 1974, at the Centre for Continuing Education. He was also a visiting professor in Social Systems Science at Wharton's Department of Social Systems Sciences and spent the 1967–68 academic year at the Centre for Advanced Studies in the Behavioural Sciences at Stanford University.

Emery was awarded the first Elton Mayo award in 1988 by the Australian Psychological Society and obtained a DSc from Macquarie University in 1992.

At the ANU, Emery continued his action research in industry and the public sector, developing new tools to enhance democratic practices within organisations and communities.

In 1979, his CCE Fellowship came to an end, and Emery subsequently worked as a consultant. In the final two years before his death, he co-edited the third and final volume of the Tavistock anthology, published by the University of Pennsylvania Press: The Social Engagement of Social Science.

Emery died at his home in Canberra, Australia, on 10 April 1997, at the age of 71.

== Publications ==
- 1969. Systems thinking. (Ed.). Harmondsworth: Penguin Books ISBN 0140800719
- 1969. Form and content in industrial democracy. With E. Thorsrud, London: Tavistock.ISBN 978-0415264389
- 1972. On Purposeful Systems: An Interdisciplinary Analysis of Individual and Social Behavior as a System of Purposeful Events. With Russell Ackoff. Chicago: Aldine-Atherton.ISBN 978-0202307985
- 1973. Hope within walls. With M. Emery. Canberra: Centre for Continuing Education, Australian National University.
- 1976. Choice of futures: To enlighten or inform (Part III). With M. Emery. Leiden: Martinus Nijhoff.
- 1976. Living at Work With Chris Phillips. Australian Government Printing Service.
- 1976. Democracy at work. With E. Thorsrud, Leiden: Martinus Nijhoff.
- 1977. Futures we are in. Leiden: Martinus Nijhoff.
- 1978. Emergence of a new paradigm of work. Canberra: Centre for Continuing Education, Australian National University.
- 1980. Domestic market segments for the telephone. With M. Emery, PA Consultants.
- 1981. Open systems thinking. Volumes I & II. Penguin.
- 1989. Towards real democracy. Toronto: Ontario QWL Centre, Ministry of Labour.
- 1991. Attitudes towards Centres for Professional Development at the University of New England. With M. Emery. Lismore: UNE.NR.
