= Critical success factor =

Management term

Critical success factor (CSF) is a management term for an element necessary for an organization or project to achieve its mission. To achieve their goals they need to be aware of each key success factor (KSF) and the variations between the keys and the different roles key result area (KRA).

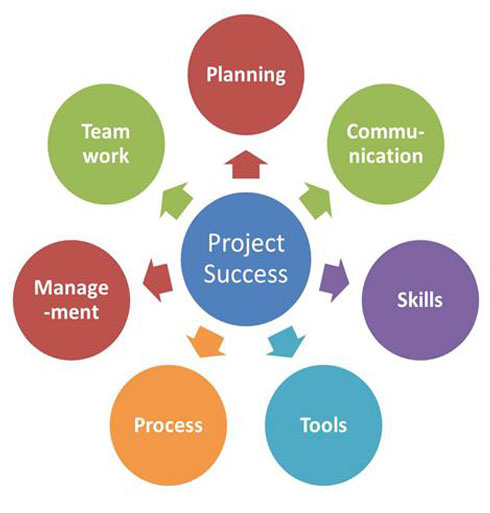
Main success keys.

A CSF is a critical factor or activity that is required for ensuring the success of a company or an organization. The term was initially used in the world of data analysis and business analysis. For example, a CSF for a successful Information Technology project is user involvement.

Critical success factors should not be confused with success criteria. The latter are outcomes of a project or achievements of an organization necessary to consider the project a success or the organization successful. Success criteria are defined with the objectives and may be quantified by key performance indicators (KPIs).

== Concept history ==
The concept of "success factors" was developed by D. Ronald Daniel of McKinsey & Company, who published an article entitled "Management Information Crisis" in the Harvard Business Review in 1961. The process was refined into critical success factors by John F. Rockart between 1979 and 1981. In 1995, James A. Johnson and Michael Friesen applied it to many sector settings, including healthcare.

== Relation to Key Success Area and Key Success Factors ==
The Critical Success Factor is basically the main system to achieve successes in a company, but to make that possible is necessary to put together the Key Success Factor that needs to be personalized depending on the department, each role has their own Key Success Area. These systems try to achieve success for the company based in standards and rules that need to be followed step by step to guarantee a better service for the clients or partners.

== Key Result Area (KRAs) ==
Key result areas or KRAs refer to the rules for a specific role in a company. The terms highlight the scope of the job profile for the employee, enabling them to have a better view of their possible role in the company. Which KRA will defer from each other depending on the department.

The Key Result Area is a specific role which each department needs to follow to deliver the goods or services in perfect condition to the final customer or to another department which will have different KSFs. It affects overall performance of the organisation and initiative of all employees towards change management thoughts which lead to their personnel as well as technical knowledge.

== Key Success Factors (KSFs) ==
In project management, multiple cross-cultural studies spread over decades have shown that the basic Key Success Factors can be summarized as follows:

| Dominant strategy | |
| Plan | |
|---|---|
| Clear definition of the project chart, goals, roles, and impacts | Clarity (transparency) |
| Access to financial resources | Efficacy |
| Set norms of quality | Efficacy |
| Realistic calendar of tasks and activities | Efficacy |
| Balanced budget | Efficacy |
| Processes | |
| Formal work methodology | Efficiency |
| Solid infrastructures | Efficiency |
| People | |
| Team work | Collaboration |
| Competencies | Competencies (Trust) |
| Commitment | Commitment |
| Power | |
| Experienced managers | Control and transparency |
| Sense of fairness | Fairness |
| Contingency strategy | |
| Risk and vulnerability assessments | Efficacy and efficiency |

== Examples ==
- The UK Government's Balanced Scorecard, used for major construction, infrastructure and capital investment procurement projects, seeks to ensure that procuring agencies address several important policy themes in a "balanced" manner, such as solution quality, cost, social and environmental benefits, and supply chain factors, when scoping their projects and evaluating supplier proposals. Each of the themes is accompanied by a series of CSFs. The "supply chain" theme has three CSFs, which illustrate how CSFs can be used: how widely the supply chain can access the opportunity to supply, how the supply chain is managed, and how supplier organisations can develop, learn and improve. Potential metrics for effective supply chain management include the number of defaults attributable to supply chain factors, the number of supply chain disputes, and the percentage of sub-contractor invoices paid late.
- In Chinese infrastructure projects, equitable and appropriate risk allocation between public and private commercial partners has been identified as one of the CSFs used on various projects.

== See also ==
- Business model
- Customer relationship management
- Business Model Canvas
