= Howard Moskowitz =

American market researcher and psychophysicist

Howard R. Moskowitz
- Born: 1945 (age 80–81); United States
- Education: Queens College (BA); Harvard University (PhD)
- Known for: Mind genomics; consumer preference segmentation; product optimization; sensory psychophysics
- Scientific career
- Fields: Psychology; psychophysics; market research; sensory science
- Workplaces: U.S. Army Natick Laboratories; Moskowitz Jacobs Inc.
- Doctoral advisor: S. S. Stevens
- Website: Board Profile

Howard R. Moskowitz (born 1944 or 1945) is an American market researcher and psychophysicist. He is known for the detailed study he made of the types of spaghetti sauce and horizontal segmentation. By providing a large number of options for consumers, Moskowitz pioneered the idea of intermarket variability as applied to the food industry.

== Early life and education ==
Moskowitz earned undergraduate degrees in mathematics and psychology from Queens College, City University of New York, where he was elected to Phi Beta Kappa.

He went on to complete a Ph.D. in Experimental Psychology at Harvard University in 1969, where he studied under S. S. Stevens, the influential psychologist known for developing modern psychophysics and the theory of measurement scales. His doctoral research focused on psychophysics and sensory perception.

== Products ==
After graduating from Harvard, Moskowitz was hired by the United States Army to improve their Meals, Ready-to-Eat, where he applied the concept of sensory-specific satiety, the tendency for consumers to tire of strongly flavored foods, to ensure that the meals were formulated in a way that encouraged soldiers to eat sufficient calories.

Since at least the 1980s, Moskowitz has been consulted by Campbell Soup, General Foods, Kraft and PepsiCo for his expertise in food optimization. According to Moskowitz he has optimized soups, pizzas, salad dressings, and pickles in his work for various firms. His research on Prego spaghetti sauce, which revealed a significant customer preference for an "extra-chunky" formulation, is notable as was his optimization of the amount of salt, sugar, and fat in spaghetti sauce at the "bliss point" which maximized consumer satisfaction.

Moskowitz developed Cherry Vanilla Dr Pepper when he was hired in 2004 by Cadbury Schweppes, which was hoping to expand the market for Dr Pepper by developing a product line extension using an alternative formulation with vanilla or cherry flavors.

== See also ==
- S. S. Stevens
- Product optimization
