= Organizational analysis =

Modelling how individuals behave in social units like workplaces

In organizational theory, organizational analysis or industrial analysis is the process of reviewing the development, work environment, personnel, and operation of a business or another type of association. This review is often performed in response to crisis, but may also be carried out as part of a demonstration project, in the process of taking a program to scale, or in the course of regular operations. Conducting a periodic detailed organizational analysis can be a useful way for management to identify problems or inefficiencies that have arisen in the organization but have yet to be addressed, and develop strategies for resolving them.

Organizational analysis focuses on the structure and design of the organization and how the organization's systems, capacity and functionality influence outputs. Additional internal and external factors are also accounted for in assessing how to improve efficiency. Undertaking an organizational analysis is helpful in assessing an organization's current well-being and capacity, and deciding on a course of action to improve the organization's long-term sustainability. A restructuring of an Organization may become necessary when either external or internal forces have created a problem or opportunity for improvement in efficiency and effectiveness.

When performing an organizational analysis, many details emerge about the functions and capacity of the organization. All of these details can make pinpointing what is efficient and inefficient difficult. Using theoretical organizational models can help sort out the information, and make it easier to draw connections. After working through these theoretical models, the organizations present situation is more adequately addressed, and the trajectory of the organization can be more fully determined.

== Organizational analysis models ==
=== Strategic triangle model ===
This model relies on three key calculations to determine the efficiency and effectiveness of an organization. First, is the value, or mission, that guides the organization. Second, is operational capacity, the knowledge and capability to carry out the mission. Third, is legitimacy and support, or the environment, that authorize the value of the organization, and offer support, (specifically financial support). Using this model, a strategy for an organization is considered good if these three components are in alignment.

=== SWOT model ===
A SWOT analysis (alternatively SWOT matrix) is a structured planning method used to evaluate the strengths, weaknesses, opportunities and threats involved in a project or in a business venture. A SWOT analysis can be carried out for a product, place, industry or person. It involves specifying the objective of the business venture or project and identifying the internal and external factors that are favorable and unfavorable to achieve that objective. The degree to which the internal environment of the entity matches with the external environment is expressed by the concept of strategic fit.

- Strengths: characteristics of the business or project that give it an advantage over others.
- Weaknesses: characteristics that place the business or project at a disadvantage relative to others
- Opportunities: elements that the project could exploit to its advantage
- Threats: elements in the environment that could cause trouble for the business or project

First, the decision makers should consider whether the objective is attainable, given the SWOTs. If the objective is not attainable a different objective must be selected and the process repeated. Users of SWOT analysis need to ask and answer questions that generate meaningful information for each category (strengths, weaknesses, opportunities, and threats) to make the analysis useful and find their competitive advantage.

=== The McKinsey 7S model ===
Visual representation of McKinsey 7S Framework.

The McKinsey 7S Framework emphasizes balancing seven key aspects of an organization, operating unit, or project. Three of the seven elements—strategy, structure, and systems—are considered "hard" elements, easily identified, described, and analyzed. The remaining four elements—shared value, staff, skill, and style—are fluid, difficult to describe, and dependent upon the actors within the organisation at any given time. The 7S organisational analysis framework is based on the premise that all seven elements are interdependent, and must be mutually reinforcing in order to be successful. Changes in a single element can result in misalignment and dysfunction throughout the organisation, disrupting organisational harmony.

=== Rational model ===
The rational model stems from the Frederick W. Taylor's (1911) Structural Perspective. Taylor was the father of time-and-motion studies and founded an approach he called "scientific management." It was Taylor's stance that organisations should be as mechanistic and efficient as possible. These Scientific Management principles served a valuable purpose for the Ford Motor Company, where the first American, mass-produced automobiles were being created. The rational model views organizations as a mechanism that is made up of various parts that can be modified in order to create an output in the shortest amount of time and without deviation.

=== Natural system model ===
The natural system model is in many ways the opposite of the rational model in that it focuses on the activities that may negatively impact the organization and therefore aims at maintaining an equilibrium in order to meet its goals. The Natural System model views organizations as an organic organism which is holistically interconnected. The parts of the organization are not seen as independent units but rather as a whole that can orchestrate together to prepare for inevitable change.

=== Sociotechnical model ===
The sociotechnical model, also known as Sociotechnical Systems (STS), is an approach to complex organizational work design that recognizes the interaction between people and technology in workplaces. The aim of sociotechnical models is to optimize both social and technological sub-systems of work. The term also refers to the interaction between society's complex infrastructures and human behavior. This model identifies the environment as a key factor that interacts with the organization.

=== Cognitive model ===
Behavior, cognitive, and other personal factors as well as environmental events, operate as interacting determinants that influence each other bidirectionally. Personal goals of the managers and staff are seen as assisting in the effort toward organizational objective attainment. Decision-making processes are focused on and specialization is deemed as important to the flow of information.

=== Meta models ===
Attempts have also been made to put elements of the above models into a kind of meta-model. Based on a theorized blindness of a single perspective, Lee Bolman and Terrence Deal have designed a model that splits analysis into four distinct paradigms. These 'frames' are to be used as a pluralistic model, and therefore allow analysts and leaders to change their thinking by re-framing understanding and points of reference. Bolman and Deal postulate that re-framing is a powerful way to think about situations in multiple ways, which is why taking a meta-model approach enables the development of alternative diagnoses and strategies.

1. Structural frame Here organisations are to be understood by role definitions and clear hierarchy. Problems come from overlapping responsibilities and unclear instructions. The assumptions are similar to the rational model shown above and Taylorism.
2. Human resource frame According to this frame organisations exist to serve society, they are places for growth and development. Problems come from when people are not motivated or trained sufficiently. This is Similar to the Sociotechnical model, or the work of Daniel Pink.
3. Political frame This frame posits that organisations are cutthroat jungles, where only the strongest survive. Problems come from poor power coalitions or overly centralized power.
4. Symbolic frame This frame supposes that organisations are deeply symbolic and successful business is about the representation genuine meaning. Problems occur when actors fail to play their parts.

Bolman and Deal lay out these frames in their book Reframing Organizations: Artistry, Choice and Leadership. The authors also provide examples of how best to apply their four frames analysis.

=== Organizational network analysis ===
Organizational network analysis (ONA) is a method for studying communication within a formal organization to make invisible patterns of information flow and collaboration in strategically important groups visible. The method is applied by first mapping the relationships among people, tasks, groups, knowledge and resources of organizational systems. Then, analyzing the collected data with a social network analysis software in order to find organic clusters, opinion leaders, peripheral and bridging actors, indirect relations that are otherwise invisible.

== Organizational strategies and structure ==
=== Organizational strategy ===
"An organization can be said to have a strategy when the leaders and the organization as a whole have committed themselves to a particular vision of how the organization will operate to create value and sustain itself in the immediate future"

Evaluating or crafting an organizational strategy requires analysis of the relationship between mission, value and resources. Strategy allows managers to focus on an organization's long-term plan and ensure that mission objectives are met. Organizational strategy explores the relationship between unit and the environment. It involves action—matching skills and resources with opportunities and threats. According to Michael Porter, a professor from Harvard Business School and leading expert in organizational strategy, the basics of a competitive model have Five Forces:

- Threat of new entrants
- Threat of substitute products or services
- Bargaining power of customers
- Bargaining power of suppliers
- Intensity of competitive rivalry

=== Private and public strategy ===
Strategy can vary between public and private sectors. In the private sector the mission is to make money for stockholders, however in the public sector its mission is full-filling a social purpose or need. Measuring success is much harder in the public sector as it’s based on when a social need or issue has been full-filled. There is often no direct link between meeting mission and being sustainable. Sometimes a social value does not align with financial performance or organizational survival.

=== Organizational structure ===
How an organization is structured depends on the coordinating mechanism used to produce the product or service. Think in terms of labor division for specific tasks and how authority is to be distributed among employees. Henry Mintzberg outlines five ways to consider labor division:

- Simple struclture: Direct Supervision with little specialization
- Machine Bureaucracy: Standardization of work with horizontal and vertical specialization
- Professional Bureaucracy: Standardization of skills with horizontal specialization
- Divisional Form: Standardization of outputs with some horizontal and vertical specialization (mainly between divisions)
- Adhocracy: Mutual adjustments with much horizontal specialization

== Performance management ==
Performance management can be defined as 'an ongoing and continuous process of communicating and clarifying job responsibilities, priorities, and performance expectations in order to ensure understanding between supervisor and employee.'

An important aspect of performance management involves designing specific measurable indicators as a means of gauging progress. Outcome indicators are not to be confused with actual outcomes, although both are pertinent to measuring progress. Outcome indicators are assigned a specific numerical measurement "that indicates progress toward achieving an outcome," but are not the outcomes themselves.

=== Example of indicators vs. outcomes ===
Performance indicators are typically quantified, with measurable descriptors like ratio, incidence, proportion, or percentage, to demonstrate progress. When establishing progress between reporting periods, an indicator may also express measurement by using words such as the change in, or the difference to describe values for particular reporting periods. By contrast, an outcome might measure the 'number of cases correctly resolved during the time period or the percentage by which the number increased this reporting period as compared to the previous period.' Thus, if a transportation system outcome indicator measures the percentage of roads in good condition, the transportation system outcome would be that roads be in acceptable and durable condition.

Performance measurement systems are often criticized for putting emphasis on indicators, at the expense of important outcome characteristics, which can lead to a misallocation of program funding resources and strategic endeavor. It is vital that indicators include a comprehensive set of outcomes that anticipate undesired ones. Examples of putting more emphasis on indicators than outcomes, include a law enforcement agency focusing solely on the number of police arrests, or a tax agency focusing solely on amount of dollars collected. Such laser focus creates a perverse incentive that might 'tempt staff to harass individual citizens [and] [businesses] to increase these values,' giving way to unintended consequences. Lastly, comprehensiveness is contingent upon measurement of resources available, as well as any existing data problems.

=== Challenging outcomes to measure ===
- Prevention Programs- (How does one measure the number of incidences prevented?)
- Basic Research and long range planning activities- (Outcomes may take years to surface)
- Programs with anonymous customers- (Ex: Hotlines)
- Programs in which major outcomes apply to a very small number of events

=== Control systems in the workplace ===
Companies encourage independence and innovation among employees in order to remain competitive, but in an effort to avoid unnecessary risk and control failures, companies must also put in place mechanisms to monitor employee progress. Included here are four major types of control levers or systems that enable managers to reconcile employee autonomy with effective control.

- Diagnostic Control Systems- Building and supporting clear targets
- Belief Systems- Communicating company core values and mission
- Boundary Systems- Specify and enforce rules of the game
- Interactive Control Systems- Open organizational dialogue to encourage learning

== Contracting-out and collaboration ==
When organizations (usually in the public sector) do not have the internal capacity to complete their mission contracting-out occurs. An analysis of the capacities, the contract or agreement, and the relationship between collaborating stakeholders is conducted. Analysis of contracting-out and/or collaborations can ensure goals are met successfully prior to the beginning of a partnership, and correct inefficiencies throughout the time frame of the collaboration.

The analysis should examine collaboration in three categories: capacity, the agreement, and the relationship. When analyzing the capacities of the collaborating organizations, examine the contractor’s capacity to deliver and meet contract service requirements. Explore the history of work and past successes as well as the financial standing of the contractor. The organization that is contracting out should have the ability (now and in the future) for monitoring, knowing when the contractor has fulfilled the contract, and for capacity building.

An analysis of the agreement, or contract, should look for several indicators of future success. The contract should be compatible with the mission statements of the collaborating organizations. Adequate funding for completion of the contract is necessary. Outcome definitions and measures must be clear. A realistic time line should be present with a plan in place for handling potential set-backs. An agreed upon system for feedback throughout the collaboration should be built into the agreement.

The relationship between collaborating organizations is important to consider. Alignment of collaborating organizations' cultures is a significant and often overlooked element of contracting-out. Alignment of the values, mission, communication style, and outcome measurements increase the likelihood of a successful collaboration.

== Cooperation and coalitions ==
=== Analysis of multiple organizations ===
Organizational analysis can analyze a single organization and its internal functioning as well as a coalition of actors in collaboration for a certain goal. Such collaboration can be analyzed for inter-actor cooperation, information sharing and capacity. A good example is "Organizational analysis of maternal mortality reduction program in Madagascar" by Harimanana, Barennes and Reinharz. This study used the Gamson’s Coalition Theory and Hining & Greenwood’s archetypes to assess the misalignment of the process by which several agencies including the Madagascar health Ministry provide prenatal services and information to women in Madagascar. Their results show several problems. Incongruity among actors disperses the services and therefore makes it difficult for women to access support. Cultural inconsistencies and failure to recognize social context, diminishes the cooperation and effectiveness of the actors. Also, the Madagascar health ministry needs basic materials and funding to provide adequate services to women. Additionally, Cumbersome directives created inefficiencies. The Analysis of the information indicated that the Madagascar Ministry of Health is a poor leader of this effort, the programs did not translate well on the local level and the different actors did not cooperate well. The study also identified capacity limits in health care but due to the misalignment and uncooperative actors, the NGO’s did not properly address the lack of capacity. This study demonstrates a complex organizational analysis. The multiple aspects of the misalignment hampered information flows. In addition, inter-actor misunderstanding increased the inefficiencies of the program. This analysis could help the functioning of the program in the future.

== Organizational analysis examples ==
=== Reflective practitioner model: Washington D.C. School System ===
In the early 2000s, the Washington D.C. public schools faced an organizational crisis. Mayor Adrian Fenty sought advice to determine what was the best way to effectively improve the Washington D.C. public schools. Fenty employed Michelle Rhee as the school district superintendent. Rhee initiated her job by analyzing all the factors that affected the school district. After evaluating all the factors Rhee decided to restructure the district. Rhee set defined metrics in order to hold teachers accountable and measure whether they were reaching goals. Rhee wanted to eliminate tenure for teachers in order to increase teacher accountability. Rhee wanted to increase the school district's efficiency, and believed that restructuring the teachers would achieve this. The process and results were controversial but illustrate an organizational approach to overcoming a policy crisis.

=== Strategic triangle model OK: Casa de Esperanza ===
In 1982, a group of women formed a shelter in St. Paul, Minnesota to address the needs of Latina women in the community that were victims of domestic violence. Casa de Esperanza immediately reached capacity, but the majority of occupants were Caucasian and African-American women. The Board of Directors was surprised to realize that very few women from the Latina community were utilizing the shelter. Casa de Esperanza continued to serve women from all backgrounds, and received government stipends for their work. The organization strove to be multicultural, while also maintaining the same mission of empowering Latinas. Many of the staff members identified with the mission of helping all women, while the Board of Directors maintained their stance on specifically helping Latinas.

The theoretical model of the, "strategic triangle," can be applied in order to better understand the organizational challenges of Casa de Esperanza. The mission and capacity of the organization are misaligned due to a few key factors. The mission of the organization is vague and overly broad, which led the staff and Board to develop opposing views of the mission. Most importantly, they could not agree on who their target demographic was. The organization’s capacity is rooted in helping women from all backgrounds with a variety of services, while the mission seems to indicate they serve Latina women predominantly. The environment suggests that there is a need amongst a broader population than just Latina women. In addition, the government is the main source of funding for the organization and they are failing at financial sustainability. In order to bring these three components into alignment, the organization would need to make a clear and specific mission statement, tailor their capacity to reach that mission, and look for alternate forms of funding. Other recommendations could be made using the strategic triangle model. The model is a useful tool to examine the organizations in a crisis situation.

=== Organizational structure and operations model: New York City Transit Authority ===
In the 1990s, the New York City Transit Authority (NYCTA) was having problems with sustainability. There was a steep decline in ridership coupled with an increase in riders who avoided paying the fare. There was an increase in crime in the subways, as well as more homeless and panhandlers congregating in the stations. When Alan Kiepper became the head of the NYCTA, he decided to restructure the organization, and place more of a focus on stations. Kiepper believed that New Yorkers would regain trust in the Transit Authority if they saw crime decline and repercussions for fare avoidance. Therefore, Kiepper used the organizational structure model to improve the organization's efficiency. Stations were given station managers who were responsible for overseeing all problems within the station. The previous division of labor was broken down, and employees began to work across departments in order to improve the stations. This is an example of focusing on an organization's structure while performing an organizational analysis.
