= Built to Last: Successful Habits of Visionary Companies =

1994 book by J. Collins and J. Porras

Built to Last Successful Habits of Visionary Companies
- Hardcover edition (2004)
- Author: Jim Collins and Jerry I. Porras
- Language: English
- Subject: Corporate strategy
- Genre: Non-fiction
- Publisher: William Collins, Sons
- Publication date: October 26, 1994
- Publication place: United States
- Media type: Hardcover
- Pages: 336 pp.
- ISBN: 0-060-56610-8

Built to Last: Successful Habits of Visionary Companies is a book written by Jim Collins and Jerry I. Porras.

It outlines the results of a six-year research project exploring what leads to successful companies.

The first edition of the book was published on October 26, 1994 by HarperBusiness.

== Objectives ==
The authors identified two primary objectives for the research published in the book: "to identify underlying characteristics are common to highly visionary companies" and "to effectively communicate findings so that they can influence management".

== What is a "visionary" company? ==
Collins and Porras defined a visionary company as one that:

- is a premier institution in its industry,
- is widely admired by knowledgeable businesspeople,
- made an imprint on the world,
- had multiple generations of chief executive officers (CEOs),
- had multiple product/service life cycles, and
- was founded before 1950.

== Key ideas ==
The book introduced a number of key ideas, including:

1. Clock Building, Not Time Telling - go beyond a great leader to building a great institution
2. No Tyranny of the "Or" - embrace the genius of "and"
3. More Than Profits - find your organization's purpose and build the "core ideology"
4. Preserve the Core / Stimulate Progress - change everything readily, except the core beliefs and values
5. Big Hairy Audacious Goals (BHAGs) - think big, aim high
6. Cult-Like cultures - cult-like adherence to the culture
7. Try a Lot of Stuff and Keep What works - try a lot of experiments and keep what works
8. Home-Grown Management - hire leaders from within
9. Good Enough Never Is - strive to do better tomorrow than you did today

Willcoxson and Millett see this study as a good example of a unitarist conception of culture within a business, i.e. where there is only one form of organizational culture which permeates the whole business, rather than finding several distinct cultures within departments or teams.

== The Built to Last companies ==
The list of visionary companies was determined based on the results of a survey of 1,000 CEOs. The authors ensured representation across all industries and various sized organizations by sampling from Fortune 500 industrial companies, Fortune 500 service companies, Inc. 500 private companies and Inc. 100 public companies. The survey yielded a 23% response rate with 3.2 companies listed per response. An important caveat the authors express is the fact that through their research, they can claim a correlation, not a causal link between their findings and the success of companies.

The list of eighteen companies identified as visionary (each had a supposedly lesser comparison company, in parentheses here, 3e p. 3):

1. 3M; (Norton Abrasives)
2. American Express; (Wells Fargo)
3. Boeing; (McDonnell Douglas)
4. Citicorp (now Citigroup); (Chase Manhattan now Chase Bank))
5. Disney; (Columbia Pictures)
6. Ford; (General Motors)
7. General Electric; (Westinghouse)
8. Hewlett-Packard; (Texas Instruments)
9. IBM; (Burroughs Corporation)
10. Johnson & Johnson; (Bristol-Myers Squibb)
11. Marriott; (Howard Johnson's)
12. Merck; (Pfizer)
13. Motorola; (Zenith Electronics)
14. Nordstrom; (Melville Corporation)
15. Philip Morris (now Altria); (RJR Nabisco)
16. Procter & Gamble; (Colgate-Palmolive)
17. Sony; (Kenwood Corporation)
18. Wal-Mart; (Ames)

These companies have taken leadership roles in their industries, offering innovative products and services and consistently outsmarting rivals. What made the research particularly useful and interesting is that Collins and Porras compared and contrasted these visionary companies with a control set of rivals. For instance, Boeing was compared and contrasted with Douglas Aircraft, Marriott was compared and contrasted with Howard Johnson's, and Merck was compared and contrasted with Pfizer. The findings are based on what the visionary companies do that is different than close competitors who have achieved a high level of success, but not to the extent of the visionary companies. From 1926 through 1990 the comparison companies outperformed the general stock market by 2 times whereas the visionary companies outperformed the market by 15 times.

== Impact ==
The book is said to be "one of the most influential business books of our era".

Built to Last has influenced many executives and entrepreneurs since it was originally published, including Red Hat. Co-author Jim Collins became a "superstar" among M.B.A.'s.

Collins used his share of the profits to establish a "management laboratory" in Boulder, Colorado, where a team of graduate students "tackle multiyear research projects aimed at answering big-business questions". This research ultimately led to subsequent books such as Good to Great, published in 2001.

== Criticism ==
In his book The Halo Effect, Phil Rosenzweig is critical of not only Built to Last but also the entire genre of business books that it belongs to, including In Search of Excellence, Good to Great, and What Really Works. It finds similar faults with a swathe of business journalism. Rosenzweig uses Built to Last as an example of the "Delusion of Rigorous Research". He mentioned that the authors had deliberately implied that their research is backed by a huge quantity of data, but the problem is that most of this data are tainted by the Halo Effect.

"It's so slippery, it's like grabbing a frog," says Richard D'Aveni, professor of strategic management at Dartmouth's Tuck School of Business, of the book, and goes on to further comment "To take this book—or any business book—as gospel is to set yourself up for a fall."

Built to Last has also been criticized for the fact that many of the companies it profiled have subsequently faltered. For example:

"Ten years on, almost half of the visionary companies on the list have slipped dramatically in performance and reputation, and their vision currently seems more blurred than clairvoyant. Consider the fates of Motorola, Ford, Sony, Walt Disney, Boeing, Nordstrom, and Merck. Each has struggled in recent years, and all have faced serious questions about their leadership and strategy. Odds are, none of them today would meet BTL's criteria for visionary companies, which required that they be the premier player in their industry and be widely admired by people in the know."

However, author Jim Collins has subsequently argued that "The books never promised that these companies would always be great, just that they were once great."

Meanwhile, Kahneman in Thinking, Fast and Slow criticizes Collins' overstatement of the importance of good practices relative to sheer luck (explaining the low performance of companies as a typical regression to the mean):

"The basic message of Built to Last and other similar books is that good managerial practices can be identified and that good practices will be rewarded by good results. Both messages are overstated. The comparison of firms that have been more or less successful is to a significant extent a comparison between firms that have been more or less lucky. Knowing the importance of luck, you should be particularly suspicious when highly consistent patterns emerge from the comparison of successful and less successful firms. In the presence of randomness, regular patterns can only be mirages."

Chris Grams, former Senior Director of Red Hat and one of Collins' biggest admirers, admits Kahneman's analysis is technically correct, but he also thinks it is emotionally bankrupt. Although Collins' books may lack academic rigor they make up for in one simple area: they inspire people. They also create the possibility of hope. "Others have done it. I could too!"

Morten Hansen who co-authored Jim Collins on Great by Choice has responded to Kahneman's criticism by referring to Chapter 7 of their book wherein they have analyzed that successful companies are not luckier than the comparisons and therefore luck cannot explain the difference, and that "Regression to the mean is not always happening, and so (it is true) for companies too."

== See also ==
- Good to Great by James C. Collins
- Great by Choice: Uncertainty, Chaos and Luck - Why Some Thrive Despite Them All by James C. Collins
- Great at Work: How Top Performers Do Less, Work Better, and Achieve More by Morten T. Hansen
- In Search of Excellence by Thomas J. Peters and Robert H. Waterman
- The Halo Effect
