= Bliss point (food) =

Term for amount of ingredients to optimize food taste

The bliss point is the amount of an ingredient such as salt, sugar or fat that optimizes palatability in the formulation of food products.

== Description ==
Pioneering work on the bliss point was carried out by American market researcher and psychophysicist Howard Moskowitz, known for his successful work in product creation and optimization for foods ranging from spaghetti sauce to soft drinks. Moskowitz used the term, bliss point, to describe "that sensory profile where you like food the most."

The bliss point for salt, sugar, or fat is a range within which perception is that there is neither too much nor too little, but the "just right" amount of saltiness, sweetness, or richness. The human body has evolved to favor foods delivering these tastes: the brain responds with a "reward" in the form of a jolt of endorphins, remembers what we did to get that reward, and makes us want to do it again, an effect run by dopamine, a neurotransmitter. The human body needs salt to balance fluids, sugar for energy, and fat to compose the brain. Besides the physical and taste need for sugar, salt, and fat, foods that contain high amounts of these ingredients are typically visually appealing. The visual appeal can override the suppression of appetite hormones for many people to consume these foods. Combinations of sugar, fat, and salt act synergistically, and are more rewarding than any one alone. In food product optimization, the goal is to include two or three of these nutrients at their bliss point.

Applications of the bliss point in the food industry have been criticized for encouraging addiction-like behaviors around eating which may contribute to obesity and other health issues.

== Research ==
Howard R. Moskowitz conducted research into the relationship between pleasantness, sweetness, and concentrations of various sugars at the Pioneering Research Laboratory in 1971. Using the results of his studies and those of other scientists, Moskowitz was able to provide some science behind the idea of the bliss point.

His results showed that the relative sweetness of sugars changes across all concentrations similarly, meaning it is nontonic. The pleasantness of sugars is not monotonic with concentration. However, the results show that pleasantness no longer has a linear relationship with concentration at extremely high or low concentrations.

== Health effects ==
Around the world people purchase and consume foods and drinks engineered to create the bliss point sensation. This has been associated with increased rates of negative health effects like obesity, diabetes and cardiovascular disease.

== See also ==
- Beverage industry
- Food industry
- Hyperreality
