= Wharton School Press =

University publishing company

- Parent company: The Wharton School
- Founded: 2011
- Country of origin: United States
- Headquarters location: Philadelphia, Pennsylvania
- Publication types: Books, Ebooks
- Nonfiction topics: Business
- Official website: www.pennpress.org/wharton-school-press/

Wharton School Press (WSP) is the book publishing arm of The Wharton School of the University of Pennsylvania. It was established in 2011 and is headquartered in Philadelphia, Pennsylvania.

Wharton School Press publishes a select list of books on a variety of topics, including leadership, management, strategy, innovation, entrepreneurship, finance, marketing, social impact, and public policy. The first book it published was The Leader's Checklist, by Wharton professor Michael Useem. As of 2023, the publishing organization has published more than 30 books.

Wharton School Press developed a fast-reading business book format that underpins its publishing program, and is also considered the first business-school press to launch a digital press.

As of July 2023, Wharton School Press is an imprint of University of Pennsylvania Press.

== History and background ==
Wharton School Press was launched in 2011 by Stephen J. Kobrin, William H. Wurster Emeritus Professor of Multinational Management, who retired from his role as executive director in 2018. At its inception, the Press was called Wharton Digital Press, which was created to experiment with the emerging digital publishing technologies. Then-executive editor Shannon Berning stated the decision to move away from a print-centric publishing model was to “respond to the way people read today.” While other business-school presses had experimented with digital technologies, the Wharton School was the first and only business school to launch a digital book press dedicated exclusively to exploring the opportunities presented by these new technologies.

Wharton School Press has published books from a wide range of thought leaders, including Wharton professors Peter Cappelli, Peter Fader, Erika H. James, Barbara Kahn, Michael Platt, Karl Ulrich, Michael Useem, Kevin Werbach, and others. Outside experts have included New York Times-bestselling author Charlene Li, former Rockefeller Foundation president Judith Rodin, and Simmons University President Lynn Perry Wooten, among others. The books, distributed and sold globally, have garnered honors including Economist Book of the Year and Washington Post Best Leadership Book, as well as coverage in the Wall Street Journal, New York Times, and other top outlets.

The name change to Wharton School Press was announced on October 15, 2019.

== Short-form business books ==
Wharton School Press developed a short-form business book format aimed at readers looking for comprehensive business knowledge but who have limited time. At 20,000-400,000 words, Wharton School Press books are more in-depth and actionable than an article or blog post and more concise and focused than a typical business book. WSP is unique in that it exclusively publishes short-form books whereas other publishers who publish short-form books do so only in select cases.

Readers and reviewers have praised the length of the Wharton School Press books: “Admirably short…yet packed...” (The Economist); “Finally—a leadership book loaded with great ideas that you can read in one sitting!” (Tom Rath, author, Strengths Finder 2.0); “succinct and invaluable” (Anne-Marie Slaughter, President and CEO, New America Foundation); “This 100-page business and career book is among the first I've seen that clearly defines the nuts and bolts of leadership in The Digital Age” (The Chicago Tribune's Joyce Lain Kennedy).

== Previous book publishing partnership ==
Wharton School Publishing was a publishing house, a division of The Wharton School and Pearson, the world's largest education publishing and technology company. The imprint brought together a variety of business educators and corporate executives on a list that featured works in many formats, including print, audio, electronic documents, CD-ROM and video. The imprint released 35 to 40 peer-reviewed books a year in 11 languages: Arabic, Chinese, English, French, German, Italian, Japanese, Korean, Portuguese, Russian, and Spanish. Authors published by Wharton School Publishing included Howard Moskowitz, Philip Kotler, Peter Drucker, C.K. Prahalad, Russell L. Ackoff, Jerry I. Porras, Henry Mintzberg and Kenichi Ohmae.

The Wharton School's publishing partnership with Pearson ended in 2010. In 2011, The Wharton School launched its own book publishing arm, Wharton Digital Press, which was renamed Wharton School Press in 2019.

== See also ==
- List of English-language book publishing companies
- List of university presses
