= Product optimization =

Production optimization is the practice of making changes or adjustments to a product to make it more desirable.

== Description ==
A product has a number of attributes. For example, a soda bottle can have different packaging variations, flavors, nutritional values. It is possible to optimize a product by making minor adjustments. Typically, the goal is to make the product more desirable and to increase marketing metrics such as Purchase Intent, Believability, Frequency of Purchase, etc.

== Methods ==
Multivariate optimization is one of the most common methods for product optimization. In this method, multiple product attributes are specified and then tested with consumers.

Due to complex interaction effects between different attributes (for example, consumers frequently associate certain flavors with packaging colors), it is problematic to use mathematical methods, such as Conjoint Analysis, typically used in industrial process optimization.

More recently companies started to adopt Evolutionary Optimization techniques for Product optimization. Evolutionary algorithms (such as IDDEA) are used to optimize products, concepts and messaging.
