= Prego =

American pasta sauce brand

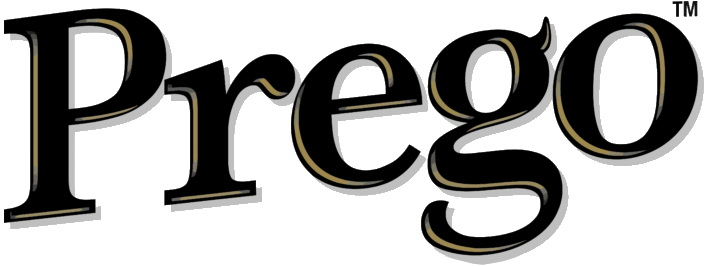

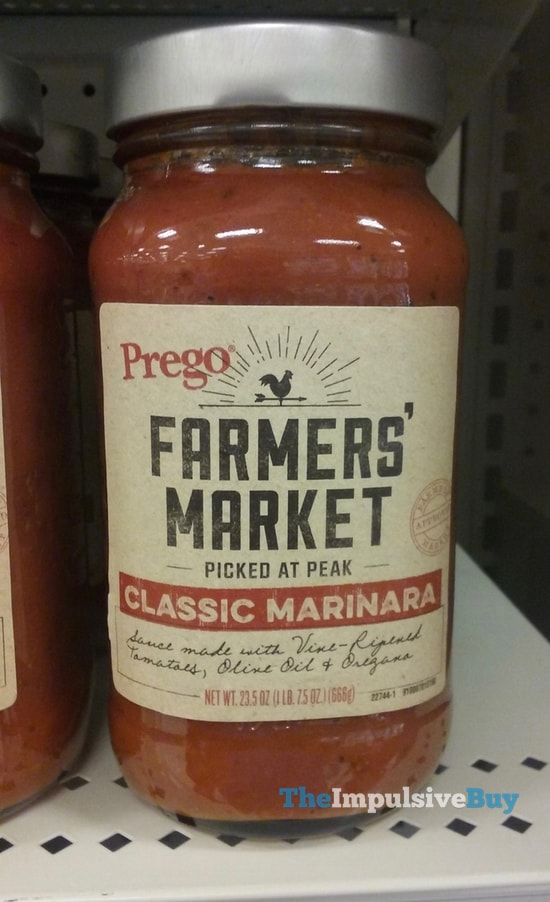
- Prego's "Sauce of the year"
- Product type: Pasta sauce
- Current owner: Campbell Soup Company
- Country: U.S.
- Introduced: 1981
- Markets: Worldwide
- Website: campbells.com/prego

Prego (Italian for "You're welcome!") is a trade mark brand name pasta sauce of Campbell Soup Company. It was introduced internationally in 1981.

== Varieties ==
Prego offers many different varieties. The traditional pasta sauce is available in nineteen different flavors including marinara, traditional, mini meatball, zesty mushroom, and roasted garlic Parmesan. In Prego's Organic line, two flavors (Organic Mushroom and Organic Tomato and Basil) are made with all organic ingredients. A third line in the Prego Pasta Sauce family is called Hearty Meat sauce. It comes in Meatball Parmesan, Authentic Italian Sausage, and Three Meat Supreme flavours. Yet another line is called Chunky Garden Pasta Sauce which consists of flavors such as Garden Combination, Mushroom Supreme, Mushrooms & Green Pepper, and Tomato, Onion & Garlic. In Asia, specific regional flavors are available, including Tom Yam in Thailand and Malaysia.

In May 2024, Campbell Soup Company expanded its Prego brand with the introduction of a new line of Creamy Pesto sauces. This new product line is designed to diversify the predominantly red sauce-dominated Italian sauce aisle by offering a creamy and versatile alternative. The Prego Creamy Pesto sauces blend the richness of Alfredo sauce with the herby brightness of traditional pesto, using ingredients such as fresh basil and cream. The line includes three varieties: Creamy Basil Pesto, Creamy Roasted Garlic Pesto, and Creamy Parmesan Pesto.

== Recipe ==
Prego was the result of efforts in the 1970s by Campbell's Soup to expand its work with tomatoes beyond the soup business. Although senior management originally wanted to create a product to directly attack Heinz (which had sued Campbell's Soup over unfair business practices) the company had no competitive advantage producing ketchup. On the other hand, Campbell's R&D group and Chef Werner Schilling developed a process to allow thick tomato sauce to be mass-produced without "weeping" (separation of water from the solids). The other major companies in the pasta sauce market, Ragu and Hunt's, used starch to achieve thickness, which limited the appeal of store bought sauce for families who wanted a sauce comparable to home made. As a result of the anti-weeping innovation and smart marketing, Prego became one of the most successful grocery product launches of the early 1980s. In 2017, William M. Hildebolt, the R&D lead on Prego's development who went on to become VP of Research and Development at Campbell's, published a history of Campbell Soup and the development of Prego called, It's in There!.

In 1986 after growth had leveled off, Campbell's Soup consulted with Howard Moskowitz, a practitioner in the field of psychophysics. His process involved the development of variations of ingredients in the formula. After placing numeric values to testers' perception on variants, a model was created to modify recipes, maximizing perceived taste while minimizing costs. Moskowitz' work systematized the process Schilling and Hildebolt had run with taste-testers during initial product development. As a result of that work, Schilling's initial recipe was materially sweetened just prior to launch, reflecting consumers' growing preference for sugary flavors and contributing to the product's immediate blockbuster success.

== Marketing ==
Prego achieved over US$100 million in sales and 28% market share in its first year, an astonishing accomplishment for a food brand entering an established market. Beyond the product innovations, Prego's marketing was also considered extraordinary with credit given to Laurel Cutler of Leber Katz who was brought in very early during the product's development, and Herb Baum, a Campbell's marketing director at the time, who backed an aggressive marketing and roll-out plan over the objections of other executives.

The brand was involved in a controversy when it featured Clara Peller in one of its ads. The elderly woman was shown holding a gigantic prop jar of one of the meaty varieties of Prego, saying: "I finally found it!" It was a reference to her earlier work in ads for Wendy's Restaurants and the catchphrase "Where's the beef?". Wendy's had not authorized her appearance in the Prego advertisement and stopped using Peller in its campaigns.
