= Tom Peters =

United States writer on organisation and employment

- Born: November 7, 1942 (age 84); Baltimore, Maryland
- Other names: Tom Peters III, Thomas J. Peters
- Education: Cornell University (BS, MS); Stanford University (MBA, Ph.D.)
- Occupations: author, consultant, Seabee
- Employer(s): McKinsey & Company, U.S. Navy
- Known for: In Search of Excellence
- Website: tompeters.com

Thomas J. Peters (born November 7, 1942) is an American writer on business-management practices, became best-known for his 1982 book In Search of Excellence (co-authored with Robert H. Waterman Jr.)

== Life and education ==
Peters was born in Baltimore, Maryland. He went to Severn School, a private, preparatory high school, graduating in 1960. Peters then attended Cornell University, receiving a bachelor's degree in civil engineering in 1964, and a master's degree in 1966.

He returned to academia in 1970 to study business at Stanford Business School receiving an MBA followed by a PhD in Organizational Behavior in 1977. The title of his dissertation was "Patterns of Winning and Losing: Effects on Approach and Avoidance by Friends and Enemies." Karl Weick credited Peters' dissertation with giving him the idea for his 1984 article: "Small wins: Redefining the scale of social problems."

While at Stanford, Peters was influenced by Jim G. March, Herbert Simon (both at Stanford), and Karl Weick (at the University of Michigan). Later, he noted that he was influenced by Douglas McGregor and Einar Thorsrud.

In 2004, he also received an honorary doctorate from the State University of Management in Moscow.

== Career ==
From 1966 to 1970, Peters served in the U.S. Navy, making two deployments to Vietnam as a Navy Seabee, then later working for the Pentagon. From 1973 to 1974, he worked in the White House as a senior drug-abuse advisor, during the Nixon administration. Peters acknowledged both the influence of military strategist Colonel John Boyd and OODA loops in his later writing.

From 1974 to 1981, Peters worked as a management consultant at McKinsey & Company, becoming a partner and Organization Effectiveness practice leader in 1979. In 1981, he left McKinsey to become an independent consultant.

In 1990, Peters was referred to in a British Department of Trade and Industry (DTI) publication as one of the world's Quality Gurus.

In 1995, the New York Times referred to Peters as one of the top three business experts in the highest demand as a speaker along with Daniel Burrus and Roger Blackwell.

By 2000, Peters was noted for his ever-increasingly aggressive and sometimes "crackpot" demeanor while at the same time his target audiences had changed towards the considerably lower ranks of SMI management.

In 2017, "Thinkers50" awarded Peters with its Lifetime Achievement Award for his paving the way for the "thought leadership" and business book industries.

=== In Search of Excellence ===
The publication of the popular business book In Search of Excellence in 1982 marked a turning point in Peters' career.

Peters states that directly after graduating with a PhD from Stanford in 1977, and returning to McKinsey, the new managing director, Ron Daniel, handed him a "fascinating assignment". Motivated by the new ideas coming from Bruce Henderson's Boston Consulting Group, Daniel noted that businesses often failed to effectively implement new strategies, so Peters "was asked to look at 'organization effectiveness' and 'implementation issues' in an inconsequential offshoot project nested in McKinsey's rather offbeat San Francisco office".

In Search of Excellence became a bestseller, gaining exposure in the United States at a national level when a series of television specials based on the book and hosted by Peters appeared on PBS. The primary ideas espoused solving business problems with as little business-process overhead as possible, and empowering decision-makers at multiple levels of a company.

The December 2001 issue of Fast Company quoted Peters admitting that he and Waterman had falsified the underlying data for In Search of Excellence. He is quoted as saying, "This is pretty small beer, but for what it's worth, okay, I confess: We faked the data. A lot of people suggested it at the time." He later insisted that this was untrue and that he was the victim of an "aggressive headline".

=== Later work ===
In 1987 Peters published Thriving on Chaos: Handbook for a Management Revolution.

In later books, Peters has encouraged personal responsibility in response to the "New Economy."

More recent books are The Excellence Dividend, released in April 2018, and Excellence Now: Extreme Humanism, released in 2021.

Peters currently lives in South Dartmouth, MA with his wife Susan Sargent, and continues to write and speak about personal and business empowerment and problem-solving methodologies.

His namesake company "Tom Peters Company" is based in Essex, UK.

== Works ==
- 1982 – In Search of Excellence (co-written with Robert H. Waterman, Jr.)
- 1985 – A Passion for Excellence (co-written with Nancy Austin)
- 1987 – Thriving on Chaos
- 1992 – Liberation Management
- 1994 – The Tom Peters Seminar: Crazy Times Call for Crazy Organizations
- 1994 – The Pursuit of WOW!
- 1997 – The Circle of Innovation: You Can't Shrink Your Way to Greatness
- 1999 - The Reinventing Work Series 50List Books
  - 1999 – The Brand You 50: Or: Fifty Ways to Transform Yourself from an "Employee" into a Brand That Shouts Distinction, Commitment, and Passion! (Reinventing Work Series) ISBN 978-0375407727
  - 1999 - The Project50: Fifty Ways to Transform Every "Task" into a Project That Matters! (Reinventing Work Series) ISBN 978-0375407734
  - 1999 - The Professional Service Firm50: Fifty Ways to Transform Your "Department" into a Professional Service Firm Whose Trademarks are Passion and Innovation! (Reinventing Work Series) ISBN 978-0375407710
- 2003 – Re-imagine! Business Excellence in a Disruptive Age
- 2005 – Talent
- 2005 – Leadership
- 2005 – Design
- 2005 – Trends (co-written with Martha Barletta)
- 2010 – The Little Big Things: 163 Ways to Pursue Excellence
- 2018 – The Excellence Dividend: Meeting the Tech Tide with Work That Wows and Jobs That Last
- 2021 – Excellence Now: Extreme Humanism
- 2022 – Tom Peters' Compact Guide to Excellence [with Nancye Green]
