= Bielard, Biehl and Kaiser five-way model =

Bailard, Biehl and Kaiser five-way model is an investor profiling model, developed by economists and investment/fund managers Bailard, Biehl and Kaiser, in which investors are classified into five categories: The model was proposed in their book Personal Money Management in 1986.

- Individualists – They are confident and careful. They generally do not go to a consultant to manage their investments but do it by themselves.
- Adventurers – Adventurers generally go for only big bets. They have the resources to do so and are willing to take risks. The investment made by this type of investors are generally focused and not diversified.
- Celebrities – Celebrities are those that are swayed too much by the trend and do not have any expertise or opinion about investments. However, not having the expertise and the confidence required to manage the portfolio on their own, they approach investment managers frequently.
- Guardians – Guardians are both anxious and careful. Lacking confidence in themselves, they approach investment counsels. They generally emphasize on safety of the capital while making the investments and a significant proportion of their investments is generally devoted to government securities and guaranteed return investments.
- Straight arrows – These are halfway between complete confidence and anxiety, and extreme carefulness and impetuousness.

== See also ==
- Behavioral economics
- Investor profile
