= Frederick Gluck =

Management Consultant

Frederick W. Gluck
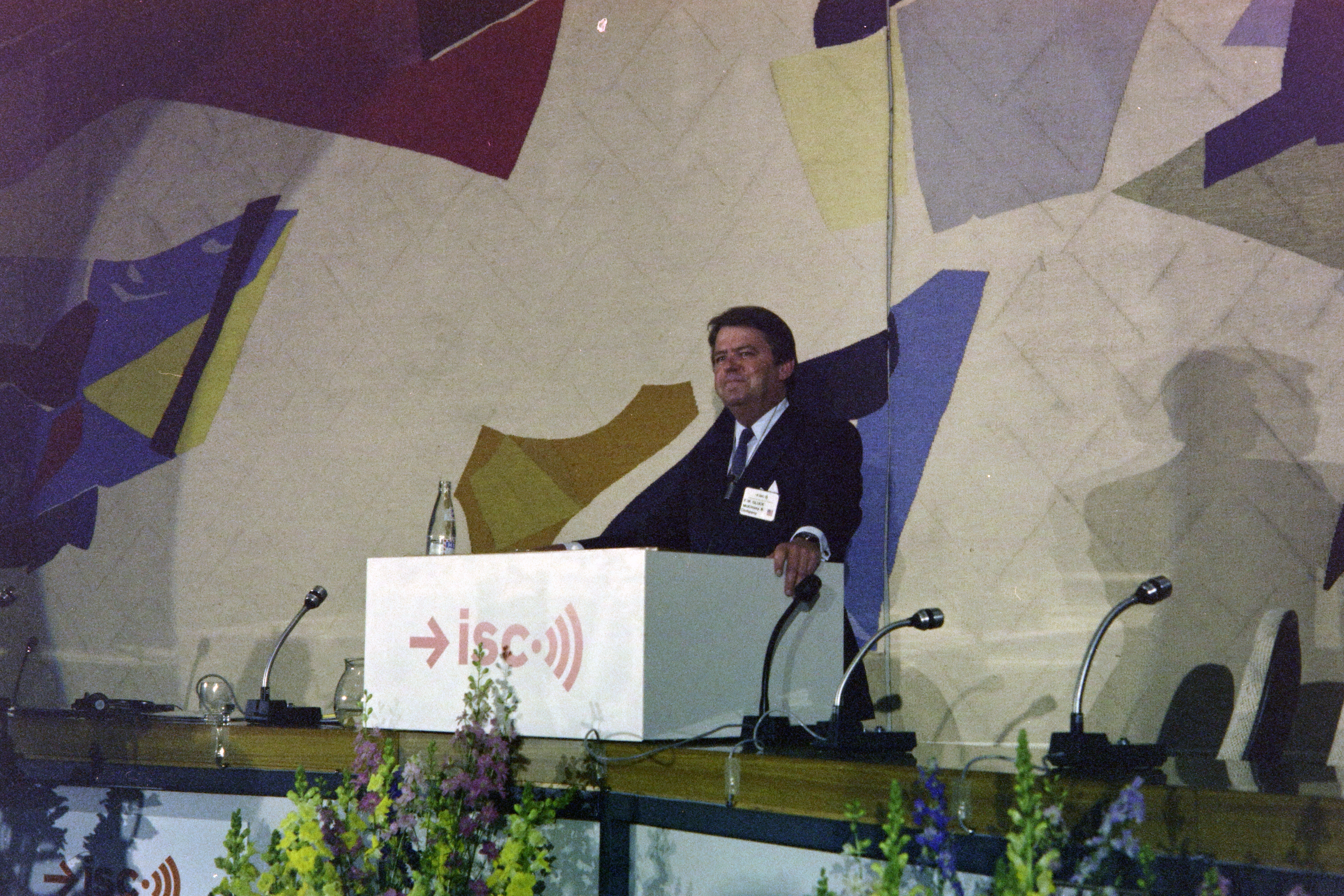
- Born: 1935 (age 90–91)
- Education: Manhattan College (BS); New York University (MS)
- Occupations: Consultant, Management expert
- Years active: 1967–1995
- Employer: McKinsey & Company, Inc.
- Title: Director Emeritus
- Term: 1988–1994 (Managing director)
- Predecessor: Ron Daniel
- Successor: Rajat Gupta

Frederick W. Gluck (born 1935) was a longtime top senior partner and director at management consultancy McKinsey & Company, serving as managing director (chief executive) from 1988 to 1994. At McKinsey he introduced the concept of fifteen “centers of competence”. He is a director at Amgen Inc. and holds directorships in public, private, and non-profit organizations.

== Education ==
Gluck attended Regis High School on the Upper East Side of Manhattan, graduating in 1953. He received a B.S. from Manhattan College and an M.S. from New York University, with both degrees in Electrical Engineering.

== Biography ==
Gluck worked at McKinsey from 1967 to 1995, succeeding Ron Daniel as managing partner in 1988 and succeeded after two terms by Rajat Gupta in 1994. From 1994–1998 he was the vice chairman and a director at the Bechtel Group engineering consulting firm. From 1998–2007 he was a director of HCA, Inc., an operator of hospitals and health care systems, and Presiding Director from 2006–2007. From 2004 to 2005 he was a director of GVI Security Solutions Inc, a public company and provider of video security solutions. Since January 2008 he has served as chairman of both CytomX Therapeutics LLC and Cynvenio Biosystems LLC, private medical technology companies. He is also a director at public biotech firm Amgen, Inc.

Gluck also holds leadership roles in scientific, medical and other non-profit organizations. He serves as Chairman at the Advisory Counsel of The Kavli Institute of Theoretical Physics (KITP) and is a member of the Executive Committee of the Kavli Foundation at University of California, Santa Barbara (UCSB). He is also Treasurer and Chairman of the Finance Committee of Cottage Hospital System, Trustee of the Foundation Board of UCSB, Governor Emeritus of New York-Presbyterian Hospital, and Director of the National Leadership Roundtable on Church Management, a Catholic lay organization of US businessmen. At UCSB, Gluck also funded the Frederick W. Gluck Chair of Theoretical Physics, an administrative chair "inspired by" and initially held by KITP institute director David Gross, with a gift of US$1M.

Gluck serves on the Harvard Business School Board of Directors of the Associates, the Management Education Council of the Wharton School, the U.S. and Hong Kong Economic Cooperation Committee, the Council on Foreign Relations, and the Board of the International Executive Service Corps. He is also a director of Russell Reynolds Associates, Inc., and a Member of the Advisory Board of Tennenbaum Capital Partners, LLC.
