= Chris Mercogliano =

American author

Chris Mercogliano is an American author, speaker, educator and mentor who writes about progressive compassionate pedagogy a.k.a. alternative education. Mercogliano's philosophy of teaching is centred on a child-centred and holistic facilitatory co-curatorial approach that begins with meeting a child where they are. Between 1973 and 2007, Mercogliano was a teacher with the Albany Free School, the oldest independent, urban democratic alternative school in the United States of America. From 1985 to 2007 Mercogliano acted as the director of the Albany Free School. He is the father of Lily Mercogliano-Easton, the director of Camp Wawa Segowea. He is also an active member of the Alternative Education Resource Organization (AERO) where he works as an online educator with educators, Jerry Mintz and Peter Berg, mentoring those who are interested in opening their own child-centred alternative schools.

Mercogliano has authored multiple books themed on progressive child-centred education including Making It Up as We Go Along: The Story of the Albany Free School, Teaching the Restless: One School's Remarkable No-Ritalin Approach to Helping Children Learn and Succeed, How to Grow a School: Starting and Sustaining Schools That Work, and In Defense of Childhood: Protecting Kids' Inner Wildness. His books have been referenced internationally in support of providing alternative learning systems and educational centres in support of children who do not do thrive in traditional, "tabla rasa" lecture-based school systems.

== Bibliography ==
- Mercogliano, Chris (1998). Making It Up As We Go Along: The Story of the Albany Free School. Portsmouth, NH: Heinemann. ISBN 0-325-00043-3
- Mercogliano, Chris (2003). Teaching the Restless: One School's Remarkable No-Ritalin Approach to Helping Children Learn and Succeed. Boston, MA: Beacon Press. ISBN 0-8070-3257-3
- Mercogliano, Chris (2006). How to Grow a School: Starting and Sustaining Schools That Work. New York, NY: Oxford Village Press. ISBN 0-945700-06-7
- Mercogliano, Chris (2007). In Defense of Childhood: Protecting Kids' Inner Wildness. Boston, MA: Beacon Press. ISBN 978-0-8070-3286-2
