= The Halo Effect (book) =

2007 book by Phil Rosenzweig

The Halo Effect...and the Eight Other Business Delusions that Deceive Managers
- Hardcover edition
- Author: Phil Rosenzweig
- Language: English
- Subject: Management
- Publisher: Free Press
- Publication date: February 6, 2007
- Publication place: United States
- Media type: Print (hardcover)
- Pages: 232
- ISBN: 978-0-7432-9125-5
- Dewey Decimal: 658 22
- LC Class: HD30.19 .R67 2007

The Halo Effect is a book by business academic Phil Rosenzweig that criticizes pseudoscientific tendencies in the explanation of business performance. The book was published by Free Press on February 6, 2007. As well as many business magazines and newspapers, the text targets specific books (those that offer secrets of guaranteed business success) and academic research published by business schools. It outlines nine "delusions": mistakes of reasoning that undermine these recipes for business success. In light of these mistakes, Rosenzweig argues, much of business writing is what Richard Feynman called "cargo cult science", having the superficial trappings of science but operating at the level of story-telling. The book also considers some more scientific business research, whose conclusions are more rigorous but do not promise a simple recipe for success. The subtitle of the 2007 US edition is "and the Eight Other Business Delusions that Deceive Managers" while that of the 2008 UK edition is "How Managers Let Themselves Be Deceived".

The book was named "Business Book of the Year" 2007 at the Frankfurt Book Fair. It has been described as part of a trend for books that encourage evidence-based practice in business research.

== Background ==
The author told reporters the book had been written over the course of 25 years of experience in business consultancy and academia. Rosenzweig earned his PhD at the University of Pennsylvania, before serving on the faculty at Harvard Business School and later at the International Institute for Management Development in Switzerland. His corporate career included seven years at Hewlett-Packard.

== Synopsis ==
=== Targets ===
The book is critical of a genre of business books including In Search of Excellence, Good to Great, What Really Works, and Built to Last. It finds similar faults with a swathe of business journalism.

=== Nine delusions ===
1. The Halo Effect of the book's title refers to the cognitive bias in which the perception of one quality is contaminated by a more readily available quality (for example good-looking people being rated as more intelligent). In the context of business, observers think they are making judgements of a company's customer-focus, quality of leadership or other virtues, but their judgement is contaminated by indicators of company performance such as share price or profitability. Correlations of, for example, customer-focus with business success then become meaningless, because success was the basis for the measure of customer focus.
2. The Delusion of Correlation and Causality: mistakenly thinking that correlation is causation.
3. The Delusion of Single Explanations: arguments that factor X improves performance by 40% and factor Y improves by another 40%, so both at once will result in an 80% improvement. The fallacy is that X and Y might be very strongly correlated. E.g. X might improve performance by causing Y.
4. The Delusion of Connecting the Winning Dots: looking only at successful companies and finding their common features, without comparing them against unsuccessful companies.
5. The Delusion of Rigorous Research: Some authors boast of the amount of data that they have collected, as though that in itself made the conclusions of the research valid.
6. The Delusion of Lasting Success: the "secrets of success" books imply that lasting success is achievable, if only managers will follow their recommended approach. Rosenzweig argues that truly lasting success (outperforming the market for more than a generation) never happens in business.
7. The Delusion of Absolute Performance: market performance is down to what competitors do as well as what the company itself does. A company can do everything right and yet still fall behind.
8. The Delusion of the Wrong End of the Stick: getting cause the wrong way round. E.g. successful companies have a Corporate Social Responsibility policy. Should we infer that CSR contributes to success, or that profitable companies have money to spend on CSR?
9. The Delusion of Organisational Physics: the idea that business performance is non-chaotically determined by discoverable factors, so that there are rules for success out there if only we can find them.

== Reception ==
Favourable reviews of the book included Forbes, The Independent, and the Financial Times. Financial Times columnist Stefan Stern wrote that Rosenzweig "deserves acclaim for this brave, provocative piece of work" and included The Halo Effect in his top business books of the year. The Halo Effect topped a Forbes.com list of "Five Must-Read Books For The Chastened CEO In 2009," which described it as a "delightful critique, which systematically destroys the entire management jujitsu oeuvre". The Wall Street Journal recommended the book for its "trenchant view of business and business advice".

USA Today's reviewer wrote, "That a management book can be at once scientific and a palatable read is a credit to Rosenzweig's writing style and clear thinking." A favorable review in The Guardian called it a "feisty and entertaining new book". Columnist Simon Hoggart also mentioned it as a "refreshing corrective" to human gullibility. A 2008 paper in the Journal of Corporate Accounting & Finance complains that the corporate world is infected with "best practicism"; the illusion that industry leadership can be made inevitable by following a simple formula. It cites The Halo Effect as an "outstanding" book. Newsweek said the book "employs an empirical rigor often lacking in business journalism" but complains that Rosenzweig "has little to offer" to replace the books he critiques.

== See also ==
- Blindspots analysis
- Fooled by Randomness
- Good to Great
- In Search of Excellence
