= Jerry I. Porras =

Jerry I. Porras (born September 20, 1938) is an American organizational theorist, Lane Professor Emeritus of Organizational Behavior and Change at the Stanford University Graduate School of Business. He is best known as co-author of the 1994 bestseller Success Built to Last: Creating A Life That Matters, written with James C. Collins.

== Life and work ==
Porras obtained his BSEE from Texas Western College in 1960, his MBA from Cornell University in 1968, and his PhD from the University of California, Los Angeles in 1974. In 1972 Porras had started his academic career at Stanford University. He became professor at its Graduate School of Business, where he served as Associate Dean from 1991 to 1994. In 2001 he retired and was appointed Lane Professor Emeritus of Organizational Behavior and Change.

Porras co-authored Success Built to Last: Creating A Life That Matters, and, with James C. Collins, the bestseller Built to Last: Successful Habits of Visionary Companies.

== Publications, a selection ==
- Jerry Porras, Stewart Emery and Mark Thompson Success Built to Last: Creating A Life That Matters, Wharton School Publishing, 2006.
- Jerry Porras and James C. Collins, Built to Last: Successful Habits of Visionary Companies, HarperCollins, 1994.

Articles, a selection:

- Porras, Jerry I., and Paal Olav Berg. "The impact of organization development." Academy of Management Review 3.2 (1978): 249–266.
- Porras, Jerry I., and Robert C. Silvers. "Organization development and transformation." Annual review of Psychology 42.1 (1991): 51–78.
- Robertson, Peter J., Darryl R. Roberts, and Jerry I. Porras. "Dynamics of planned organizational change: Assessing empirical support for a theoretical model." Academy of Management Journal 36.3 (1993): 619–634.
- Collins, James C., and Jerry I. Porras. "Building your company's vision." Harvard Business Review 74.5 (1996): 65.
