= Richard Pascale =

American management theorist (1938–2024)

Richard T. Pascale
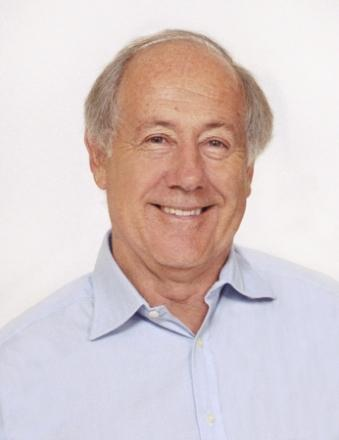
- Richard Pascale, 2024
- Born: Richard Tanner Johnson; June 14, 1938; USA
- Died: May 24, 2024; USA
- Occupations: Management Theorist; Business Advisor; Business Professor; Author

Richard Tanner Pascale (June 14, 1938–May 24, 2024) was an American academic, management theorist and business advisor. He earned his MBA at Harvard.

He was based at Stanford Business School for 20 years and was named an Associate Fellow of the Saïd Business School at the University of Oxford in 2020. The Economist magazine has named him "one of the leading management gurus of the past 50 years".

== Works ==
Pascale's management works include:

- The Art of Japanese Management: Applications for American Executives (1981), co-authored with Anthony Athos of Harvard Business School.
- Managing On the Edge: How Successful Companies Use Conflict to Stay Ahead (1990),
- Surfing the Edge of Chaos: The Laws of Nature and the New Laws of Business (2000), co-authored with Mark Millemann and Linda Gioja,
- The Power of Positive Deviance: How Unlikely Innovators Solve the World's Toughest Problems (2010), co-authored with Jerry Sternin and Monica Sternin. This book is seen as a contributing precursor to the concept of SEED-SCALE.

In Managing on the Edge (1990), Pascale noted that "few of the top 500 companies in the US 10 years ago" (i.e. 1980) were still leading companies and looked for explanations for why companies decline.

Pascale also catalogued management fads (or business fads), enumerating 37 different new management ideas which emerged between 1950 and 2000.

== Honda Study ==
One of Pascale's most notable articles – on Honda's success in breaking into the US motorcycle market in the 1960's – is often referenced in the Lean, Agile and strategy communities. The 1984 California Management Review article has come to be known as "Honda B," or "The Honda Effect," and was declared a classic business study by Henry Mintzberg in the Harvard Business Review. It is considered notable for describing close customer observation as you experiment and learn your way toward finding your business strategy.

In the article Pascale coins the phrase “adaptive persistence,” meaning that many priorities become clear only as you strive to move toward something rather than through advance planning. You find the path along the way based on what is being learned along the way. In hindsight, then, what seems to be strategy emerges. "In sum, 'strategy' is defined as 'all the things necessary for the successful functioning of organization as an adaptive mechanism.'"

== Collaboration ==
Several of Pascale's works were co-authored. In The Power of Positive Deviance, he took the lead in writing up observations and reflections based on the work of his co-authors Jerry and Monique Sternin, fieldworkers and Positive Deviance practitioners who had undertaken Peace Corps child development work in Vietnam, observed by Pascale.

The work of the Sternins was also observed in Bangladesh, Indonesia, Myanmar, Uganda, Argentina and the Pittsburgh VA Hospital and incorporated into the book.
