= Good to Great =

2001 management book by Jim C. Collins

Good to Great: Why Some Companies Make the Leap... and Others Don't
- Front cover
- Author: Jim C. Collins
- Language: English
- Subject: Corporate strategy
- Genre: Non-fiction
- Publisher: HarperCollins
- Publication date: October 16, 2001
- Publication place: United States
- Media type: Hardcover
- Pages: 320
- ISBN: 978-0-06-662099-2
- OCLC: 46835556
- Dewey Decimal: 658 21
- LC Class: HD57.7 .C645 2001

Good to Great: Why Some Companies Make the Leap... and Others Don't is a management book by Jim C. Collins that describes how companies transition from being good companies to great companies, and how most companies fail to make the transition. The book was a bestseller, selling four million copies and going far beyond the traditional audience of business books. The book was published on October 16, 2001.

== The Good to Great companies ==
=== Great companies and their comparators ===
Collins finds eleven examples of "great companies" and comparators, similar in industry-type and opportunity, but which failed to achieve the good-to-great growth shown in the great companies:

Great Company	Comparator
Abbott Laboratories	Upjohn
Circuit City Stores	Silo
Fannie Mae	Great Western Bank
Gillette Company	Warner-Lambert Co
Kimberly-Clark	Scott Paper Company
Kroger	A&P
Nucor	Bethlehem Steel
Philip Morris	R. J. Reynolds
Pitney Bowes	Addressograph
Walgreens	Eckerd
Wells Fargo	Bank of America

=== Unsustained companies ===
Collins includes six examples of companies that did not sustain their change to greatness. These companies were "looked at separately as a clump":

Unsustained Comparisons
Burroughs
Chrysler
Harris
Hasbro
Rubbermaid
Teledyne

Collins refers in his book to "the hedgehog concept". This idea draws on an essay by Isaiah Berlin entitled "The Hedgehog and the Fox", where the world is divided into hedgehogs and foxes, based upon an ancient Greek parable: "The fox knows many things, but the hedgehog knows one big thing."

== Responses ==
=== Praise ===
The book was "cited by several members of The Wall Street Journal's CEO Council as the best management book they've read".

Publishers Weekly called it "worthwhile", although "many of Collins' perspectives on running a business are amazingly simple and commonsense".

It was described as "a deeply-researched analysis..." in the Time list of The 25 Most Influential Business Management Books.

=== Criticism ===
In his 2012 article, The Moral Fox, Peter C. DeMarco identifies the fatal error in Collins' book as placing the good in direct opposition to greatness and, thus, unintendedly creating a proxy for greed. DeMarco goes back to Aesop's original fable to expose and correct the error.

Holt and Cameron state the book provides a "generic business recipe" that ignores "particular strategic opportunities and challenges."

Steven D. Levitt noted that some of the companies selected as "great" have since gotten into serious trouble, such as Circuit City and Fannie Mae, while only Nucor had "dramatically outperformed the stock market" and "Abbott Labs and Wells Fargo have done okay". He further states that investing in the portfolio of the 11 companies covered by the book, in the year of 2001, would actually result in underperforming the S&P 500. Levitt concludes that books like this are "mostly backward-looking" and can't offer a guide for the future.

John Greathouse alleges in a critical review that Collins once made a comment stating, "The books never promised that these companies would always be great, just that they were once great." Greathouse claims the statement was an attempt by Collins to defend the book, and other previous works. Greathouse also represents the view that Collins' book How the Mighty Fall: And Why Some Companies Never Give In blames some of the failed companies themselves for having drastically changed after Collins' books were printed.

Phil Rosenzweig describes errors in the fundamental research assumptions of Good to Great. First, heavy reliance on magazine articles as research introduce sources littered with halo effects. He also notes the Wrong End of the Stick delusion used in the hedgehog claims of the book in that successful companies have a luxury of focus which is not possible for less successful companies. Finally, he notes the presence of the Organizational Physics delusion in that Collins does not carefully avoid confusing correlation with causation.

== Similar books ==
- Built to Last: Successful Habits of Visiorary Companies by James C. Collins and Jerry I. Porras
- Great by Choice: Uncertainty, Chaos and Luck - Why Some Thrive Despite Them All by James C. Collins
- Great at Work: How Top Performers Do Less, Work Better, and Achieve More by Morten T. Hansen
- The Halo Effect
- In Search of Excellence by Thomas J. Peters and Robert H. Waterman
