= Robert H. Waterman Jr. =

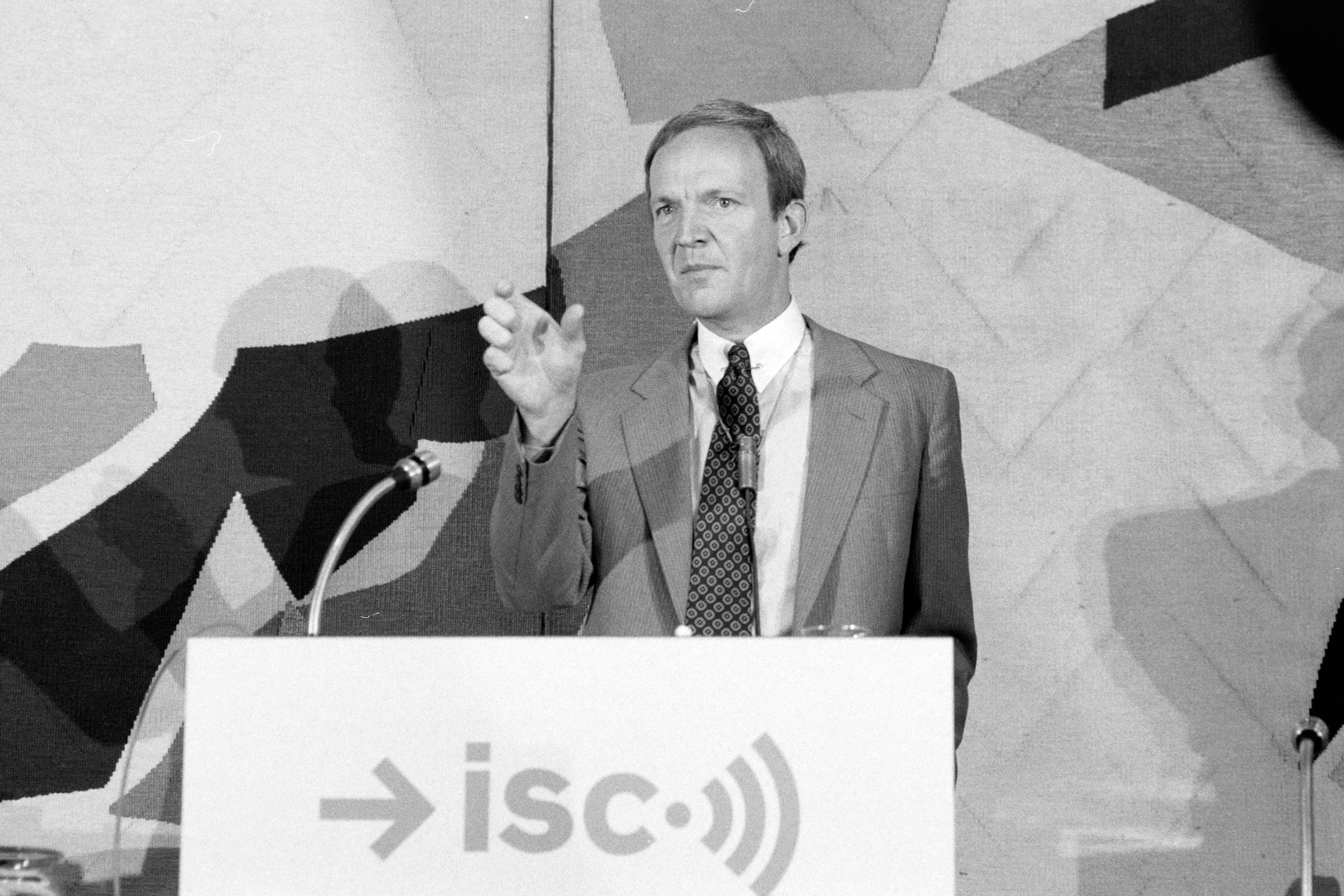
- Born: 11 November 1936
- Died: 2 January 2022 (aged 85)

Robert Hanna Waterman Jr. (November 11, 1936 – January 2, 2022) was an American non-fiction author and expert on business management practices.

Waterman was best known as the co-author, with Tom Peters, of In Search of Excellence. Waterman later directed his own company, The Waterman Group, Inc., after 21 years at the management consulting firm McKinsey & Company.

In Search of Excellence was published in 1982 and became a bestseller, gaining national exposure when a series of television specials based on the book and hosted by Waterman and Peters appeared on PBS. The primary idea espoused was that of solving business problems with as little business process overhead as possible, and empowering decision-makers at multiple levels of a company.

He was also the author of:

- The Renewal Factor
- Adhocracy: the Power to Change
- What America Does Right (Frontiers of Excellence in Europe and UK).

== Career ==
Waterman earned his bachelor's in geophysics from the Colorado School of Mines in 1958, and MBA from Stanford University in 1961. From 1963 until 1985 Waterman worked for the management consulting firm McKinsey & Company becoming a Director in 1976. Later he served as a Founding Director of the electric power firm, AES.

== Personal life and death ==
Waterman served as chair of the RLS Foundation, the national non-profit organization that sponsors research, raises awareness of, and looks for better treatments for Restless leg syndrome. He also served on the boards of the World Wildlife Fund, Scleroderma Research Foundation, the Sleep Disorders Research Advisory Board at the NIH, US Ski Team, ASK Group, Boise Cascade, the AES Corporation, and McKesson.

Waterman died in Palo Alto, California on January 2, 2022, at the age of 85.
