= Ron Daniel =

American businessman

D. Ronald Daniel
- Born: February 26, 1930
- Died: December 16, 2023 (aged 93)
- Citizenship: United States
- Education: Wesleyan University; Harvard University
- Occupations: Consultant, Management expert
- Years active: 1957–1990
- Employer: McKinsey & Company, Inc.
- Known for: critical success factors
- Title: Senior Partner Emeritus
- Term: 1976–1988 (Managing director)
- Successor: Fred Gluck

D. Ronald Daniel (February 26, 1930 – December 16, 2023) was an American longtime top senior partner and director at management consultancy McKinsey & Company, serving as managing director (chief executive) from 1976 to 1988.

== Biography ==
Ronald Daniel graduated from Wesleyan University with a B.A. in mathematics in 1952 and received an M.B.A. from Harvard Business School in 1954.

== Business career ==
After graduating in 1954, Daniel served as an officer of the U.S. Navy Supply corps, where he worked with early IBM mainframes. He joined McKinsey & Company, Inc. in 1957 and was a senior partner from 1968 to 1990. He served as managing director for twelve years (1976-1988) preceding Fred Gluck, and was senior partner emeritus of the firm.

At McKinsey, Daniel developed the concept of "success factors", which led to the emergence of critical success factors, those "areas of [business] activity that should receive constant and careful attention from management". He hired and mentored future managing director Rajat Gupta. He was Jeffrey Skilling's former boss before Skilling became CEO of Enron.

In 2004, he described himself as "the bridge between McKinsey's founding generation and the present".

Outside McKinsey, he was a director of Yum! Brands and chairman of New York-based private equity firm Ripplewood Holdings.

== Public service career ==
Daniel had a longtime affiliation with Harvard University. He served for many years as treasurer of the university. Daniel was a member of the Harvard Corporation and chairman of the board of the Harvard Medical School. He was also chairman of the Harvard Management Company, which oversees over $20 billion in assets and endowments.

Daniel held an Honorary Doctor of Humane Letters degree from Wesleyan and was chairman emeritus of the school's board of trustees. He was a member of the board of Thirteen/WNET (New York's public broadcasting station), a member of the board of the Brookings Institution, and a trustee of Rockefeller University. He was a member of the American Academy of Arts and Sciences and the Council on Foreign Relations.

Business positions
| Preceded by | Managing director of McKinsey & Company, Inc. 1976 –1988 | Succeeded by Fred Gluck |
