= Einar Thorsrud =

Norwegian psychologist (1923–1985)

Einar Thorsrud (30 April 1923 – 29 May 1985) was a Norwegian psychologist, researcher and professor at the Norwegian Institute of Technology in Trondheim and University of Oslo, who is known for his work in the field of organizational development (OD), particularly in the development of theory around participative work design structures. Much of his work was done in collaboration with Eric Trist and/or Fred Emery. Thorsrud has been Research Director of the Norwegian Work Research Institute in Oslo, Norway.

== Work ==
Einar Thorsud has been closely connected with the use of social science in non-governmental areas and the associated impact over policy-making in these areas.

== Publications ==
Einar Thorsrud wrote several books:

- 1964, Industrielt demokrati : Representasjon på styreplan i bedriftene? Noen norske og utenlandske erfaringer, with Fred Emery and Eric Trist. Oslo: Universitetsforlaget.
- 1969, Form and content in industrial democracy., with Fred Emery. London: Tavistock. (English version of:)
- 1969/1970, Mot en ny bedriftsorganisasjon, with Fred Emery. Oslo: Johan Grundt Tanum forlag.
- 1974, Et skip i utvikling - Høegh Mistral-prosjektet, with Jaques Roggema. ISBN 82-518-0220-2 Oslo: Johan Grundt Tanum forlag.
- 1976, Democracy at Work, with Fred Emery. Leiden: Martinus Nijoff.
- 1983, Teori I Praksis: Festskrift til Einar Thorsrud. with Thoralf Ulrik Qvale and Jon Frode Blichfeldt. ISBN 82-518-1836-2 (in Norwegian) Oslo: Tanu-Norli
- 2003, Form and Content in Industrial Democracy: Some Experiences from Norway, with F. E. Emery, Routledge,

ISBN 0-415-26438-3.
