= Parent-infant psychotherapy =

Psychodynamic Therapy with Infants and Parents (abbr. PTIP) aims to relieve emotional disturbances within the parent(s), the baby, and/or their interaction, for example, postnatal depression and anxiety, infant distress with breastfeeding and sleep, and attachment disorders. It rests on attachment theory and psychoanalysis. Sigmund Freud suggested that a modification of his method could be applied to children, and child analysis was introduced in the 1920s by [Anna Freud].., [Melanie Klein], and Hermine Hug von Hellmuth. Klein speculated on infantile experiences to understand her patients' disorders but she did not practice PTIP. Donald Winnicott, a pediatrician and analyst, focused on the mother-baby interplay in his theorizing and his brief parent-child consultations, but he did not work with PTIP.

== Definitions ==
PTIP was introduced by Selma Fraiberg and Françoise Dolto after World War II. Fraiberg was trained in the ego-psychological tradition, while Dolto was a contemporary and colleague of Jacques Lacan. Another section Attachment-based therapy (children) complements the present one. A related method was developed by Esther Bick at the Tavistock Clinic in London, psychoanalytic infant observation, aiming to enhance therapy students' skills and to train clinicians who work with babies. This article focuses on "the phase prior to word presentation and the use of word symbols", that is, up to 18 months of age.

A psychodynamic perspective sees humans as struggling with unconscious urges that impact on their character, relationships, interests, passions, conscious attitudes, and cognitive capacities. PTIP focuses both on patients' behaviors and feelings as well as their unconscious motives for developing and maintaining them. Supportive elements are limited, though the therapist's "holding" or "containing" the patient's distress does have such ingredients. Other methods are more supportive and encourage the mother to change her behavior with the baby; developmental guidance, infant massage, interaction guidance, and Marte Meo. They are not covered here.

Parents strive consciously to bond with the child and provide a fertile ground for attachment. Simultaneously, their unconscious impulses may run in opposite directions. Psychoanalytic theory often regards the mother as the baby's primary object, especially, her body parts or functions that stimulate the infant's fantasy life. Her bodily closeness with the foetus and the child will add unique qualities to their relationship. Yet, modern fathers are involved with their babies and some therapists argue that they should be invited more often in PTIP.

== A late development ==
Sigmund Freud viewed the baby as involved in passionate relationships with his parents. He also uncovered infant-like remnants in every adult's personality. This affects the countertransference, the therapist's emotional reactions to the patient, even more so if the patient is a baby. The PTIP therapist is prone to a "massive identification with the child… it is not always easy to control one's reactions to [the baby's] positive or negative provocations". This may explain why PTIP took a long time to develop. Also, the notion of psychoanalysis as a "talking cure" led to the idea that the primary therapy data are words, rather than all the "representations or signifiers of process". This, too, may have prevented analysts from treating babies. Those from the tradition of ego psychology advise against attributing mental capacities beyond the baby's developmental time-table. This may make them reluctant to view the baby as an active participant in therapy. A final reason for the late development of PTIP might be that the high prevalence of postnatal depression and infant emotional disturbances, was demonstrated only recently. Many "baby worries" emerge at Child Health Centers without the mother feeling that she needs psychotherapy herself. It is the baby who functions, through various symptoms, as the alarm-clock.

== PTIP methods: A survey ==
=== Infant-parent psychotherapy ===
Selma Fraiberg formulated brief crisis interventions, interaction guidance-supportive treatments, and infant-parent psychotherapy. The first focused on problems arising from a "circumscribed set of external events". The second aimed at guiding parents with a more limited psychological-mindedness and was more of an "educational technique". Infant-parent psychotherapy, in contrast, was a PTIP method used when a baby reminded the parents of "an aspect of the parental self that is repudiated or negated", for example a painful childhood memory. This "ghost in the nursery" marred the parent's interactions with the baby, who got engulfed in the parental neurosis and developed an emotional disturbance himself. The treatment goal was that "the pathology which had spread to embrace the baby" could be withdrawn and the mother-baby relationship improve. In randomized controlled trials (RCT), Fraiberg's method was about as efficacious as Interaction Guidance (Robert-Tissot et al.) and Watch, Wait and Wonder (Cohen et al.), though the effects were slower in coming. Compared with a non-intervention group, its results were superior (Lieberman et al.). Lieberman and Van Horn also wrote a comprehensive monograph, see under "Further reading".

Therapists in Geneva, work with less disadvantaged families than Fraiberg. Some publications were published in English. Their thinking resembles Fraiberg's but they focus more on the mother's psychopathology, for example, her self-preoccupation. The infant's symptoms might express "a repressed tendency in the parent", which enters into a "core conflictual relationship" with the baby and will be enacted in therapy. These clinicians seem to regard the child as less of an active therapy participant than did Fraiberg.

=== Therapeutic consultations ===
The interventions of Serge Lebovici at the Centre Alfred Binet in Paris resembled Winnicott's therapeutic consultations and Fraiberg's crisis interventions. Whereas Fraiberg suggested the mother's trauma might build up to forming the "ghost", Lebovici focused more on how her unconscious infantile sexuality colored her relationship with the baby. The baby's presence in sessions stimulated the therapist's metaphoric function, which he used to understand the roots of the dilemmas of mother and child.

Some books by Françoise Dolto, another Parisian psychoanalyst, were translated into English but they do not cover her work with infants (see, however,). She thought a baby may understand some literal meaning of the therapist's words. This is refuted by research. On the other hand, babies seem to grasp that words indicate something special though they do not understand their literal sense. Dolto claimed that when parents conceal painful or embarrassing facts it may stunt the baby's development, as when a mother wishes to protect her baby and conceal her personal worries. This creates a paradoxical situation for the baby who might sense mother's painful affects beneath her care-taking. Dolto thought words impacted on the baby via the parent's courage in pronouncing embarrassing emotional truths: "Before the age of words, the presence of a mother speaking to her infant is a nourishment more valuable than the milk she offers at the breast".

Other Parisian therapists focus on psychosomatic disorders, which they link theoretically to infantile distress.

=== Mother-infant psychoanalytic treatment ===
Like Dolto, the Swedish psychoanalyst Johan Norman sought to establish a relationship with the infant, who he thought possessed a primordial subjectivity and an intersubjectivity. He also thought the baby sought for containment from the therapist, and that she had a "unique flexibility in changing representations of itself and others that comes to an end as the ego develops". Early therapy was thus recommended. He addressed the baby about emotional processes but disagreed that she can understand the lexical meaning of words.

Questions about the baby's role in PTIP become less puzzling once we clarify that human communication takes place at various levels, among which the verbal is only one. Many analysts today use concepts by the American philosopher of Semiotics, Charles Sanders Peirce to describe the therapeutic process. They can help us understand the communicative levels in PTIP treatments. A similar perspective is used by infant researchers who micro-analyze the interactive mismatches of certain mother-infant interactions.

=== The infant as subject ===
Therapists in Melbourne work with babies to "enter treatment through the infant's world rather than primarily through the parents' representations". They develop a relationship with the baby in presence of the parents, believing that "the infant as subject" needs engagement in his own right. They, too, are convinced that a baby may direct emotions towards a therapist but in some contrast to Norman, they do not privilege promoting the baby's negative affects towards him/her.

=== Watch, Wait and Wonder ===
This technique (WWW; from the Hincks-Dellcrest Center in Toronto) has been compared with Fraiberg's mother-infant psychotherapy in an RCT. Its proponents argue that if a mother does not perceive and respond to her baby's signals, a secure attachment will not develop. The therapist asks her to get on the floor, observe the baby, and interact at the baby's initiative. Mother becomes an "observer of her infant's activity, potentially gaining insight into the infant's inner world and relational needs". The therapist is "watching, waiting, and wondering about the interactions between mother and infant" (p. 437). The method also contains supportive elements in providing "a safe, supportive environment…". See also.

=== The PIP team at the Anna Freud Centre ===
Parent-Infant Psychotherapy (PIP) at the Anna Freud Centre in London integrates Freudian metapsychology with infant research, attachment theory and developmental psychology. The authors use a psychoanalytic framework and wish to promote "the parent-infant relationship in order to facilitate infant development" (p. 25), support the baby's "attachment needs" towards his caregivers (p. 8), and scaffold him to help in his "emotional regulation" (p. 26). The baby is seen as a "partner in the therapeutic process" (p. 79). The overall goal is to support his "beginning mentalization and emotional regulation" (p. 75).

== The impact of the setting and the clinical sample ==
Most authors worked in public health clinics, whereas Norman's cases were drawn mainly from his private practice and were long, high-frequency treatments with what seemed well-motivated parents. Fraiberg often treated mothers with a low educational and economic status, which also applies to the London PIP team. The Melbourne therapists treat severely sick children and their parents. Such factors will influence the parents' trust in the clinician, motivation for therapeutic work, and economic and practical means of taking part in treatment.

== Outcome research ==
PTIP therapists have published clinical studies in various scientific journals. Randomized controlled trials (RCT) are increasing: Most used follow-up periods of up to six months, except two with a follow-up of four years.

Many problems pertain to evaluating PTIP. Mother and baby are at different developmental levels and during infancy, emotional experiences may change swiftly. The baby's health is inferred through questionnaires or mother-baby recordings. Another validity problem is that most studies were made at the clinical center where the investigated method was developed. Thus, we do not know if it is equally effective in other circumstances. This may explain why a recent Cochrane review only found some evidence of improved infant attachment but none concerning parental mental health. This is in contrast to several RCTs, which did find effects on maternal depression. Plausibly, the Cochrane study comprised several samples of different socio-economic and psychiatric characteristics. Some methods may be efficacious if the clinician takes such pre-treatment factors into consideration and recommends "the right treatment for the right family". Another meta-analysis found, in contrast, minor treatment effects on infant development and mental health, and significant effects on parent-infant relationship and parenting ability. To sum up, research methods need further development and we need studies from more centers.

== Training and organization ==
There are courses, for example, at the [Columbia University Center for Psychoanalytic Training and Research] and the Anni Bergman Parent Infant Training Program in New York, the Anna Freud Centre and the Tavistock and Portman NHS Foundation Trust and the School of Infant Mental Health in London, [International Psychoanalytic University Berlin], the University Sackler School of Medicine in Tel Aviv, the "Säuglings-Kleinkind-Eltern-Psychotherapie" or SKEPT in München, Centro Studi Martha Harris in Italy, the Eriksson Infant Mental Health Certificate Program in Chicago, the Infant-Parent Program at the University of California, San Francisco, training programs in Barcelona organized by the Spanish Psychoanalytical Society, and in Buenos Aires at the Hospital Italiano. The members of the World Association of Infant Mental Health (WAIMH) are therapists and researchers. Its congresses contain presentations of detailed PTIP case material and outcome studies. The WAIMH consists of local associations, which also host regular conferences.

== Works cited ==
- Aarts, M. (2000). Marte Meo: Basic manual. Harderwijk, Netherlands: Aarts Productions.
- Aisenstein, M. (2006). The indissociable unity of psyche and soma: A view from the Paris Psychosomatic School. International Journal of Psychoanalysis, 87(3), 667–680.
- Armstrong, K. L., & Morris, J. (2000). Promoting secure attachment, maternal mood and child health in a vulnerable population: A randomized controlled trial. Journal of Paediatrics and Child Health, 36(6), 555–562.
- Baradon, T., Broughton, C., Gibbs, I., James, J., Joyce, A., & Woodhead, J. (2005). The practice of psychoanalytic parent-infant psychotherapy – Claiming the baby. London: Routledge.
- Barlow, J., Bennett, C., Midgley, N., Larkin, S. K., & Yinghui, W. (2015). Parent-infant psychotherapy for improving parental and infant mental health. Cochrane Database of Systematic Reviews, 1(CD010534). doi: 10.1002/14651858.CD010534.pub2.
- Barrows, P. (1999). Fathers in parent-infant psychotherapy. Infant Mental Health Journal, 20(3), 333–345.
- Beebe, B., & Lachmann, F. (2014). The origins of attachment. Infant research and adult treatment. New York: Routledge.
- Bick, E. (1964). Notes on infant observation in psychoanalytic training. International Journal of Psychoanalysis, 45, 558–566.
- Bion, W. R. (1962). Learning from experience. London: Karnac Books.
- Cardenal, M. (1998). A psycho-analytically informed approach to clinically ill babies. Infant Observation, 2(1), 90–100.
- Clark, R., Tluczek, A., & Wenzel, A. (2003). Psychotherapy for postpartum depression: a preliminary report. American Journal of Orthopsychiatry, 73(4), 441–454.
- Cohen, N. J., Lojkasek, M., Muir, E., Muir, R., & Parker, C. J. (2002). Six-month follow-up of two mother-infant psychotherapies: Convergence of therapeutic outcomes. Infant Mental Health Journal, 23(4), 361–380.
- Cohen, N. J., Muir, E., Parker, C. J., Brown, M., Lojkasek, M., Muir, R., & Barwick, M. (1999). Watch, wait and wonder: Testing the effectiveness of a new approach to mother-infant psychotherapy. Infant Mental Health Journal, 20(4), 429–451.
- Cooper, P. J., Murray, L., Wilson, A., & Romaniuk, H. (2003). Controlled trial of the short- and long-term effect of psychological treatment of post-partum depression. 1. Impact on maternal mood. British Journal of Psychiatry, 182(5), 412–419.
- Cramer, B. (1997). The scripts parents write and the roles babies play. Northvale: Jason Aronson Inc.
- Cramer, B., & Palacio Espasa, F. (1993). La pratique des psychothérapies mères-bébés. Études cliniques et techniques (The practice of mother-infant psychotherapies. Clinical and technical studies). Paris: PUF.
- Dolto, F. (1982). Séminaires de psychanalyse d'enfant, vol. 1 (Seminars on child psychoanalysis, vol. 1). Paris: Editions du Seuil.
- Dolto, F. (1985). Séminaires de psychanalyse d'enfant, vol. 2 (Seminars on child psychoanalysis, vol. 2). Paris: Editions du Seuil.
- Dolto, F. (1994). Solitude. Paris: Gallimard.
- Dolto, F. (2013/1971). Psychoanalysis and paediatrics: Key psychoanalytic concepts with sixteen clinical observations of children (Francoise Hivernel & F. Sinclair, Trans.). London: Karnac.
- Dowling, S. (1982). Review of "Clinical studies in infant mental health. The first year of life: Edited by Selma Fraiberg. Psychoanalytic Quarterly, 51, 430–434.
- Espasa, F. P., & Alcorn, D. (2004). Parent-infant psychotherapy, the transition to parenthood and parental narcissism: Implications for treatment. Journal of Child Psychotherapy, 30(2), 155–171.
- Field, T. (2000). Infant massage therapy. In C. H. J. Zeanah (Ed.), Handbook of infant mental health (494–500). New York: The Guilford Press.
- Fivaz-Depeursinge, E., & Corboz-Warnery, A. (1999). The primary triangle. A developmental systems view of mothers. fathers, and infant. . London: Basic Books.
- Fraiberg, S. (1980). Clinical studies in infant mental health. New York: Basic Books.
- Fraiberg, S. (1989). Assessment and therapy of disturbances in infancy. Northvale, N.J.: Jason Aronson Inc.
- Freud, A. (1926). Introduction to the technique of child analysis. London: Imago Publishing Co.
- Gavin, N. I., Gaynes, B. N., Lohr, K. N., Meltzer-Brody, S., Gartlehner, G., & Swinson, T. (2005). Perinatal depression: a systematic review of prevalence and incidence. Obstetrics & Gynecology, 106(5 Pt 1), 1071–1083.
- Gervain, J., Macagno, F., Cogoi, S., Peña, M., & Mehler, J. (2008). The neonate brain detects speech structure. Proceedings of the National Academy of Sciences of the United States of America, 105, 14222–14227.
- Hall, G., Hivernel, F., & Morgan, S. (Eds.). (2009). Theory and practise in child psychoanalysis: An introduction to Françoise Dolto's work. London: Karnac.
- Hayes, L., Matthews, J., Copley, A., & Welsh, D. (2008). A randomized controlled trial of a mother-infant or toddler parenting program: demonstrating effectiveness in practice. Journal of Pediatric Psychology, 33(5), 473–486.
- Klein, M. (1932). The psycho-analysis of children (Vol. 22). London: Hogarth Press.
- Lebovici, S., & Stoléru, S. (2003). Le nourisson, sa mère et le psychanalyste. Les interactions précoces (The baby, his mother and the psychoanalyst. Early interactions). Paris: Bayard.
- Lieberman, A. F., Weston, D. R., & Pawl, J. H. (1991). Preventive intervention and outcome with anxiously attached dyads. Child Development, 62(1), 199–209.
- Lojkasek, M., Cohen, N. J., & Muir, E. (1994). Where is the infant in infant intervention? A review of the literature on changing troubled mother-infant relationships. Psychotherapy: Theory, Research, Practice, Training, 31(1), 208–220.
- MacLean, G., & Rappen, U. (Eds.). (1991). Hermine Hug-Hellmuth, her life and work. New York and London: Routledge.
- Manzano, J., Palacio Espasa, F., & Zilkha, N. (1999). Les scénarios narcissiques de la parentalité. Clinique de la consultation thérapeutique (The narcissistic scenarios of parenthood: The practice of therapeutic consultations). Paris: PUF, le Fil Rouge.
- McDonough, S. (2004). Interaction guidance. Promoting and nurturing the caregiving relationship. In A. J. Sameroff, McDonough, S.C., & Rosenblum, K.L. (Ed.), Treating parent-infant relationship problems (pp. 79–96). New York: The Guilford Press.
- Murray, L., Cooper, P. J., Wilson, A., & Romaniuk, H. (2003). Controlled trial of the short- and long-term effect of psychological treatment of post-partum depression. 2. Impact on the mother—child relationship and child outcome. British Journal of Psychiatry, 182(5), 420–427.
- Norman, J. (2001). The psychoanalyst and the baby: A new look at work with infants. International Journal of Psychoanalysis, 82(1), 83–100.
- Olinick, S. L. (1985). The primary data of psychoanalysis. Contemporary Psychoanalysis, 21, 492–500.
- Paglia, M. (2016). The Maison Verte, a transitional space: introducing the work of Françoise Dolto in the UK. Infant Observation, 19(3), 224–237.
- Robert-Tissot, C., Cramer, B., Stern, D. N., Serpa, S. R., Bachmann, J.-P., Palacio-Espasa, F., . . . Mendiguren, G. (1996). Outcome evaluation in brief mother-infant psychotherapies: Report on 75 cases. Infant Mental Health Journal, 17(2), 97–114.
- Salo, F. T. (2007). Recognizing the infant as subject in infant-parent psychotherapy. International Journal of Psychoanalysis, 88, 961–979.
- Salomonsson, B. (2007). "Talk to me baby, tell me what's the matter now". Semiotic and developmental perspectives on communication in psychoanalytic infant treatment. International Journal of Psychoanalysis, 88(1), 127–146.
- Salomonsson, B., & Sandell, R. (2011a). A randomized controlled trial of mother-infant psychoanalytic treatment. 1. Outcomes on self-report questionnaires and external ratings. Infant Mental Health Journal, 32(2), 207–231.
- Salomonsson, B., & Sandell, R. (2011b). A randomized controlled trial of mother-infant psychoanalytic treatment. 2. Predictive and moderating influences of quantitative treatment and patient factors. Infant Mental Health Journal, 32(3), 377–404.
- Sherick, I. (2009). A proposal to revive "Parent Guidance": An illustration of a brief intervention with the mother of a toddler. Psychoanalytic Study of the Child, 64, 229–246.
- Singleton, J. L. (2005). Parent-infant interaction interventions: A meta-analysis. Dissertation Abstracts International: Section B: The Sciences and Engineering.
- Skovgaard, A. M., Houmann, T., Christiansen, E., Landorph, S., Jorgensen, T., Team, C. C. C. S., . . . Lichtenberg, A. (2007). The prevalence of mental health problems in children 1½ years of age - the Copenhagen Child Cohort 2000. Journal of Child Psychology & Psychiatry & Allied Disciplines, 48(1), 62–70.
- Sleed, M., Baradon, T., & Fonagy, P. (2013). New Beginnings for mothers and babies in prison: A cluster randomized controlled trial. Attachment & Human Development, 15(4), 349–367. doi: 10.1080/14616734.2013.782651
- Stern, D. N. (1985). The interpersonal world of the infant. New York: Basic Books.
- Stern, D. N. (1995). The motherhood constellation: A unified view of parent-infant psychotherapy. London: Karnac Books.
- Toth, S. L., Rogosch, F. A., Manly, J. T., & Cicchetti, D. (2006). The efficacy of toddler-parent psychotherapy to reorganize attachment in the young offspring of mothers with major depressive disorder: A randomized preventive trial. Journal of Consulting and Clinical Psychology, 74(6), 1006–1016.
- Tronick, E. (2007). The neurobehavioral and social-emotional development of infants and children. New York City: W. W. Norton.
- Tuters, E., Doulis, S., & Yabsley, S. (2011). Challenges working with infants and their families: Symptoms and meanings—two approaches of infant–parent psychotherapy. Infant Mental Health Journal, 32(6), 632–649.
- Watillon, A. (1993). The dynamics of psychoanalytic therapies of the early parent–child relationship. International Journal of Psychoanalysis, 74, 1037–1048.
- Winberg Salomonsson, M., Sorjonen, K., & Salomonsson, B. (2015). A long-term follow-up of a randomized controlled trial of mother–infant psychoanalytic treatment: Outcomes on the children. Infant Mental Health Journal, 36(1), 12–29.
- Winnicott, D. W. (1960). The theory of the parent-infant relationship. International Journal of Psychoanalysis, 41, 585–595.
- Winnicott, D. W. (1971). Therapeutic consultations in child psychiatry. London: The Hogarth Press.
- von Klitzing, K., Simoni, H., Amsler, F., & Bürgin, D. (1999). The role of the father in early family interactions. Infant Mental Health Journal, 20(3), 222–237.
- Zeanah, C. (Ed.). (2009). Handbook of infant mental health (3 ed.). New York: The Guilford Press.
- Zlot, S. (2007). The parenthood conflict in the light of mother-infant psychotherapy. Mellanrummet, 16, 11–22.
