= Donald Meltzer =

Psychoanalyst (1922–2004)

Donald Meltzer (1922–2004) was a Kleinian psychoanalyst whose teaching made him influential in many countries. He became known for making clinical headway with difficult childhood conditions such as autism, and also for his theoretical innovations and developments. His focus on the role of emotionality and aesthetics in promoting mental health has led to his being considered a key figure in the "post-Kleinian" movement associated with the psychoanalytic theory of thinking created by Wilfred Bion.

== Life and work ==
Meltzer was born in New York City and studied medicine at Yale University. He practised in St. Louis as a psychiatrist, before moving to England in 1954 to have analysis with Melanie Klein. He joined the "Kleinian group", became a teaching analyst of the British Psychoanalytical Society (BPS) and took on British citizenship. In the early 1980s disagreements about the mode of training led him to withdraw from the BPS. Meltzer worked with both adults and children. Initially his work with children was supervised by Esther Bick, who was creating a new and influential mode of psychoanalytic training at the Tavistock Clinic based on mother-child observation and following the theories of Melanie Klein. As a result of the regular travels and teaching of Meltzer and Martha Harris, his third wife, who was head of the Child Psychotherapy Training Course at the Tavistock Clinic, this model of psychoanalytic psychotherapy training became established in the principal Italian cities, in France and Argentina.

Meltzer taught for many years at the Tavistock Clinic, and practised privately in Oxford until his death. Owing to having left the BPS, his ideas remained controversial. He supervised psychoanalytically-oriented professionals in atelier-style groups throughout Europe, Scandinavia and South America, and his visits also included New York and California. Since his death in 2004 his reputation has increasingly regained ground also in his adoptive country. Several international congresses have focussed on his work: in London (1998), Florence (2000), Buenos Aires (2005), Savona (2005), Barcelona (2005) and Stavanger, Norway (2007).

=== Imago Group ===
Meltzer was a member of the Kleinian Imago Group founded by the Kleinian aesthete Adrian Stokes for discussing applied psychoanalysis. The group included among others Richard Wollheim, Wilfred Bion, Roger Money-Kyrle, Marion Milner and Ernst Gombrich. With Stokes he wrote a dialogue “Concerning the social basis of art”. Meltzer's aesthetic interests, combined with the mother-baby model of early learning processes, led to seeing psychoanalysis itself as an art form. His later works describe the relationship between analyst and analysand as an aesthetic process of symbol-making. This has had an influence on the philosophical view of the relation between art and psychoanalysis.

=== Overview ===
Some of Meltzer's significant and widely used developments of Kleinian object relations theory are as follows:

- The aesthetic conflict, the foundation for normal development, based on the internal mother-baby relationship, was formulated in Meltzer and Harris Williams (1988) The Apprehension of Beauty
- Intrusive identification, a form of projective identification associated with life in the Claustrum (narcissistic pathology), first formulated in early seminal papers “The relation of anal masturbation to projective identification” and “The delusion of clarity of insight”, and expanded in The Claustrum (1992)
- Pseudo-maturity, a common clinical manifestation of arrested development
- Adhesive identification and dismantling in two-dimensional autistic states, formulated in a work documenting Meltzer's experience with 5 colleagues in treating autistic children, Explorations in Autism (1975)
- The preformed transference, first described in The Psychoanalytical Process (1967), referring to the patient's initial preconceptions about a psychoanalytic relationship which have to be overcome before a genuine transference and countertransference can be established
- A reappraisal of Melanie Klein's discovery of the combined internal object, which stresses its beneficial nature as a basis for mental development, begun in Richard Week-by-Week, Part II of The Kleinian Development (1978).

=== The claustrum ===
In his final work, The Claustrum: An Investigation of claustrophobic phenomena (1988), Donald Meltzer developed a theory of claustrophobia. Meltzer offers a Kleinian/Bionian appreciation of the phenomenon of claustrophobia, arguing that the claustrum emerges as a failure of integration in early childhood development. If there occurs massive projective identification, that the child cannot sustain, its understanding both of its own corporeality, and that of others is severely impacted. It is a result of maternal failure in the reverie and leads to an incorrect construction of the internal mother. Claustrophobia in that sense "means to be imprisoned in a state of mind without getting out", it has do with being trapped in the projective identification of others

== Bibliography ==
- The Psychoanalytical Process (Heinemann 1967), reprinted Perthshire: Clunie Press, 1970
- Sexual States of Mind (1973) Perthshire: Clunie Press
- Explorations in Autism: a psychoanalytic study (1975) Perthshire: Clunie Press
- with Martha Harris: A psychoanalytic model of the child-in-the-family-in-the-community (a study commissioned by the United Nations, published in French in 1976 and first published in English in Sincerity: Collected Papers of Donald Meltzer (1994).
- The Kleinian Development: Book I (Freud), Book II (Klein), Book III (Bion). Single-volume edition Perthshire: Clunie Press, 1978
- Dream Life: a re-examination of the psycho-analytical theory and technique (1983) Perthshire: Clunie Press
- Studies in Extended Metapsychology: clinical applications of Bion’s ideas (1986) Perthshire: Clunie Press
- with Meg Harris Williams: The Apprehension of Beauty: the role of aesthetic conflict in development, art and violence (1988) Perthshire: Clunie Press
- The Claustrum: an investigation of claustrophobic phenomena (1992) Perthshire: Clunie Press
- Sincerity and Other Works: Collected Papers (1994) ed. A. Hahn. London: Karnac

For books by Meltzer translated into languages other than English, see the publishing lists of: Armando (Rome, Italy); Bollati Boringhieri (Turin, Italy); Borla (Rome, Italy), Cortina (Milan, Italy); Dunod (Paris, France); Hublot (Brittany, France); Diskord (Tübingen, Germany); Klett-Cotta (Stuttgart, Germany); Spatia (Buenos Aires, Argentina); Paradiso editores (Ciudad de México, México); Grafein (Barcelona, Spain); Kongo Shuppan (Tokyo, Japan).

== As a teacher ==
Meltzer was well known internationally as a teacher and supervisor. He favoured an atelier-style system for the teaching and selection of candidates for psychoanalytical training, adumbrated in his paper, “Towards an atelier system”.

His method was to ask supervisees to present sessions of unedited clinical material, rather than finished papers. Several of his groups and individual supervisees have documented their experiences:

- Castella, R., Farre, L., Tabbia, C. (2003) Supervisions with Donald Meltzer. London: Karnac.
- Emanuel, R. (2004) “A personal tribute to Donald Meltzer”, Bulletin of the Association of Child Psychotherapists 149, 11–14
- Fisher, J. (2000) “Reading Donald Meltzer: identification and intercourse as modes of reading and relating”, Exploring the Work of Donald Meltzer ed. Cohen and Hahn. London: Karnac, 188–202
- Hoxter, S. (2000) “Experiences of learning with Donald Meltzer”, Exploring the Work of Donald Meltzered. Cohen and Hahn. London: Karnac,12–26
- Psychoanalytic Group of Barcelona (2000), “A Learning Experience”, Exploring the Work of Donald Meltzer ed. Cohen and Hahn. London: Karnac, 203–14
- Psychoanalytic Group of Barcelona (2002) Psychoanalytic Work with Children and Adults. London: Karnac
- Psychoanalytic Group of Barcelona (2007) De un Teller psicoanalitico, a partir de Donald Meltzer. Barcelona: Grafein (in Spanish)
- Oelsner, M. and Oelsner, R. (2005) “About supervision: an interview with Donald Meltzer”, British Journal of Psychotherapy, 21 (3).
- Racker Group of Venice (2004) Transfert, Adolescenza, Disturbi del Pensiero. Armando (in Italian)

== See also ==
- Bizarre object
- Dream interpretation
- Object relations theory
- Reparation
- Sigmund Freud
