= Joy Osofsky =

American psychologist

- Occupations: Professor of clinical psychology and psychiatry
- Spouse: Howard Osofsky (m. 1963)
- Children: Hari, Justin, Michael
- Awards: Presidential Commendation from the American Psychiatric Association (2010); American Psychological Association Nicholas Hobbs Award (2002)

Academic background
- Education: Syracuse University

Academic work
- Institutions: Louisiana State University School of Medicine

Joy D. Osofsky is a clinical and developmental psychologist, known for her research on infant mental health, how parents nurture their infants and children, and the repercussions that follow exposure to traumatic events and violence. Some of her notable work has examined the aftereffects of Hurricane Katrina, experiences of children raised in broken households, and the impact of the COVID-19 pandemic on communities. Osofsky is employed as a Professor of Pediatrics, Psychiatry, and Public Health at the Louisiana State University Health Sciences Center, and she is Head of the Division of Pediatric Mental Health at the Louisiana State University School of Medicine. Osofsky holds the Barbara Lemann Professorship of Child Welfare at LSU Health New Orleans.

== Biography ==
Joy Victoria Doniger was born into an American-Jewish family and attended Rye Country Day School. Doniger developed interest in studying psychology at the age of 16, following her father's death from a heart attack. Doniger married Howard Osofsky on September 1, 1963, in Syracuse, New York. Osofsky currently has three children, Hari, Justin, and Michael.

Osofsky attended Simmons College for one year before transferring to Syracuse University, where her husband was working at the time. Osofsky received her B.A. degree in Psychology cum laude at Syracuse University in August 1966. She then received her M.A. in June 1967, and her PhD in June 1969, both in Psychology at Syracuse University. During the 1960s, as one of few women at Syracuse University, Osofsky stood up for individual rights and equality for women and was involved in civil rights and anti-war movements.

Osofsky interned in Clinical Psychology at Children's Hospital Medical Center and at Judge Baker Guidance Center at Harvard Medical School from August 1975 to July 1976. She was a Postdoctoral Fellow in Clinical Psychology at the Menninger Foundation from July 1976 to August 1978. She completed psychoanalytic training at the Topeka Institute for Psychoanalysis in July 1985.

Osofsky joined the National Register of Health Service Providers in 1979 and was professionally certified as a clinical psychologist in the State of Louisiana in 1987. Osofsky is a former president and current board member of the Zero to Three organization. Following Hurricane Katrina, Osofsky was the Clinical Director of Louisiana Spirit's Child and Adolescent Initiatives. In addition to her work in disaster recuperation, she has worked with children, families, and law enforcement to address community violence.

== Awards ==
- Harris Award, Chicago Institute for Psychoanalysis (1989-1990)
- Pfizer Award for Excellence in Research, Education, and Patient Care, Louisiana State University Medical Center (1997)
- Badge of Honor Award, New Orleans Police Foundation (1998)
- Best Social Science Reference Text, American Publishers Association (2000)
- Role Model Distinction Award, Young Leadership Council (2001)
- Medal of Honor, Mayor of New Orleans (2002)
- Nicholas Hobbs Award, American Psychological Association Division 37 (2002)
- Outstanding Service Award, Family Services of New Orleans (2007)
- Sarah Haley Award for Clinical Excellence, International Society for Traumatic Stress Studies (2007)
- Distinguished Partners in Education Award, Board of Elementary and Secondary Education of the Louisiana Department of Education (2009)
- Honorary President Distinction, World Association for Infant Mental Health (2010)
- Presidential Commendation, American Psychiatric Association (2010)
- Reginald Lourie Award (2014)
- Lifetime Achievement Award, Zero to Three (2021)

== Research ==
Osofsky's work focuses on the long-term physical, mental, and emotional well-being of children in society, coping methods, and recovery from traumatic events. Osofsky has examined the negative consequences of experiencing violent events within the home or neighborhood setting, where ideally children should feel secure and loved. Osofsky's research indicates growing up in a violent environment may contribute to delays in developmental milestones in infants and toddlers.

Osofsky studied the development of children living in low-income communities throughout the United States, where many have witnessed violence and crime, including shootings, stabbings, drug dealing, and robberies. Children who experience unexpected and random tragedies, including the deaths of family and community members, may come to fear that these events will repeat in the future, which may result in post-traumatic stress disorder. Violence also causes emotional instability, such that when young children interact with others, they display concerning levels of hesitation and fright. Young children may form associations that lead them to anticipate traumatic events, including sensory information they vividly remember from the first time something horrific occurred. Being exposed to mature and explicit visuals may result in a loss of innocence, such that children may mentally begin to normalize the destructive environment, and may be at risk of becoming more combative and delinquent. Osofsky observed that vulnerable children may start to believe their problems can be solved with violence, that it is normal for violence to take place within families, that one can get away with violence in intimate relationships, and that violence can be a strategy for getting people to do what you want. Osofsky has described poverty as a silent form of violence, which may contribute to the occurrence of mental health disorders in one in five impoverished children.

== Books ==
- Emde, R. N., Osofsky, J. D., & Butterfield, P. M. (Eds.). (1993). The IFEEL pictures: A new instrument for interpreting emotions. International Universities Press, Inc.
- Katz, L. F., Lederman, C. S., Osofsky, J. D., & Maze, C. (Collaborator). (2011). Child-centered practices for the courtroom and community: A guide to working effectively with young children and their families in the child welfare system. Paul H Brookes Publishing.
- Osofsky, H. J., & Osofsky, J. D. (1973). The abortion experience: Psychological & medical impact. Harper & Row.
- Osofsky, J.D. (Ed.) (1987). Handbook of Infant Development, 2nd Edition. John Wiley and Sons.
- Osofsky, J.D. (Ed.) (1997). Children in a Violent Society. Guilford Publishers.
- Osofsky, J.D. (Ed) (2004). Young Children and Trauma: Intervention and Treatment. Guilford Publishers.
- Osofsky, J.D. (Ed) (2011). Clinical Work with Traumatized Young Children: Regaining their Future. Guilford Publishers.
- Osofsky, J. D., & Fenichel, E. (Eds.). (1994). Caring for infants and toddlers in violent environments hurt, healing, and hope. Distributed by ERIC Clearinghouse.
- Osofsky, J. D., & Fenichel, E. S. (1996). Islands of safety: Assessing and treating young victims of violence. Zero To Three.
- Osofsky, J. D., & Fenichel, E. S. (Eds.). (2000). Protecting young children in violent environments: Building staff and community strengths. Zero to Three.
- Osofsky, J.D. & Fitzgerald, H.E. (Eds.). (2000). WAIMH Handbook of Infant Mental Health. John Wiley and Sons.
- Osofsky, J. D., & Groves, B. M. A. (Eds.). (2018). Violence and trauma in the lives of children: Overview of exposure (Vol. 1). Praeger, an Imprint of ABC-CLIO, LLC.
- Osofsky, J. D., & Groves, B. M. A. (Eds.). (2018). Violence and trauma in the lives of children: Prevention and intervention (Vol. 2). Praeger, an Imprint of ABC-CLIO, LLC.
- Osofsky, J. D., Stepka, P. T., & King, L. S. (2017). Treating infants and young children impacted by trauma: Interventions that promote healthy development. American Psychological Association.
