= Martha Harris =

Martha Harris may refer to:

- Martha Harris (psychoanalyst)
- Martha Harris (footballer)
