= Marcella Balconi =

Italian politician

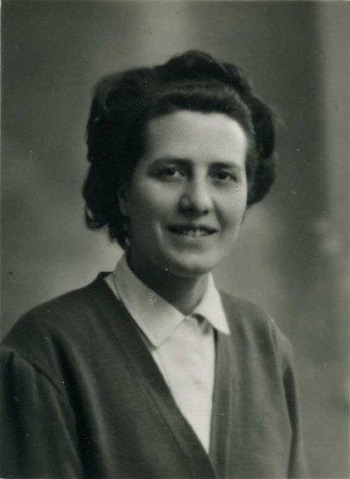
- Born: 8 February 1919; Romagnano Sesia, Italy
- Died: 5 February 1999 (aged 79); Novara, Italy
- Education: University of Pavia
- Occupations: Physician; Parliamentarian
- Father: Giuseppe Balconi

Marcella Balconi (8 February 1919 – 5 February 1999) was an Italian child psychiatrist, member of the resistance during World War II and a Parliamentary politician. She pioneered the practice of psychoanalytic infant observation in Italy.

== Biography ==
Balconi enrolled in the Faculty of Medicine of the University of Pavia and was introduced to her future profession while working, during the holidays, with her father who was a physician in a medical clinic nearby.

In 1943 she graduated from medical school and went to work with the clinician and pediatrician Pietro Fornara (1897– 1975), a pioneer in the field of child neuropsychiatry as well as a fervent anti-fascist and head of the resistance movement in Novara, Italy.

=== Partisan ===
During the World War II, she left her position as an assistant at the Institute of Biological Chemistry in Pavia in 1944 to join resistance forces. She became health inspector of the resistance forces and, together with her cousin and future co-author Maria Elvira Berrini, Balconi formally entered the Italian Resistance as a physician working with the Garibaldi Brigades, first in Valtellina and then in Turin. As part of her assignments, she was given the dossiers of Italian compatriots who had been killed by the Nazis. The collection also included photographs and information about the deaths of "many adolescents and children: in that dramatic circumstance she took upon herself the solemn commitment to do everything to save the children."

=== Researcher ===
After the war, she helped organize the child neuropsychiatry service offered by the charity hospital in Novara. Balconi served as deputy director of the National Motherhood and Childhood Work (ONMI) from 1945 to 1948 and organized a pilot research effort modeled after the French and Swiss medical-pedagogical centers she had seen. In the 1950s she suggested new research in Italy using a test developed in Switzerland by L. Verlag Hans Huber Düss, in which researchers study the drawings of children who illustrated their reactions to Düss's fables.

During her work, even as late as the 1970s, Balconi introduced to her Italian colleagues the practice of psychoanalytic infant observation and used it to train social and health professionals. It also became a standard diagnostic practice in Italy. In doing so, she confirmed theories of the Polish researcher Esther Bick (1901–1983), and she earned recognition as one of the "pioneers of Italian child neuropsychiatry."

=== Parliamentarian ===
Throughout her life, Balconi kept an eye on the political landscape in Italy, writing,

... from the beginning I had a political commitment and a medical commitment. I have always tried to combine these two commitments. There has always been a link between political choice, interest in certain social classes and my work.

She was elected provincial councilor representing the Italian Communist Party (PCI) in 1946. In 1963 she was elected to the Italian Parliament, the Chamber of Deputies, sitting on the Hygiene and Health Committee, representing the district of Turin, Italy. She took that opportunity to draft a law that would reform the hospital system, which was made into law in 1968 with the help of minister Luigi Mariotti.

During her five years in the Italian Parliament, she introduced a total of 22 bills of which five became law, including Act 2185 of 13 March 1965, Protection of mental health and psychiatric assistance.

=== Personal life ===
She was born 8 February 1919 in Romagnano Sesia in northern Italy, the daughter of a physician Giuseppe Balconi.

Although Balconi resigned in 1980 as director of the Child Neuropsychiatry Service of the Novara hospital (Ospedale Maggiore), she remained professionally active until her death on 5 February 1999 at 79 years of age.

== Memberships ==
Considered a "Pioneer of Child Psychoanalysis in Italy," she was very well known in her field.

- Founder of the first Child Psychiatry Service in Piedmont
- Founding Member of the Italian Society of Child Neuropsychiatry (SINPI)
- Founding Member of the Italian Society of Psychoanalysis (SIP)
- Ordinary Member and Teacher of the World Society of Psychoanalysis

== Selected works ==
- M. Balconi, Difficult children, "Abnormal childhood," n. 1, 1953, pp. 20–29
- M. Balconi, The drawing applied to the fables of Düss, "Abnormal childhood," n. 3, 1953, pp. 432–480
- M. Balconi, ME Berrini, Diagnosis of structure in child psychiatry, "Abnormal childhood," n. 23, 1957
- M. Balconi, ME Berrini, Method of statistical processing. The first elaborations: connections between the "personal characters" and some mesological and hereditary factors, n. 23, 1957, "Abnormal childhood," n. 23, 1957
- M. Balconi, ME Berrini, Statistical-clinical study on a group of 1000 children reported for difficulty in adapting to school. First part, "Abnormal childhood," n. 25, 1958, pp. 42–89
- M. Balconi, ME Berrini, Statistical-clinical study on a group of 1000 children reported for difficulty in adapting to school. Second part, "Abnormal childhood," n. 28, 1958, pp. 411–463
- M. Balconi, ME Berrini, Statistical-clinical study on a group of 1000 children reported for difficulty in adapting to school. Third part, "Abnormal childhood," n. 30, 1959, pp. 42–92
- M. Balconi, ME Berrini, Statistical-clinical study on a group of 1000 children reported for difficulty in adapting to school. Part Four, "Abnormal Childhood," n. 32, 1959, pp. 309–333
- M. Balconi, ME Berrini, On school maladjustment in the first grade. Part five. Concluding notes, "Abnormal childhood," n. 36, 1960, pp. 7–42
- M. Balconi and G. Del Carlo Giannini, Primary experiences and personality development. Studies on child drawing, in Psychology and Personality, edited by LM Lorenzetti, Milan, Franco Angeli, 1995
- M. Balconi, Listening to the child: images, stories, fantasies, with the collaboration of ME Berrini and F. Fornari, edited by R. Dionigi, Cesena, The old bridge, 1999
