= Allan Schore =

American neuroscientist (1943)

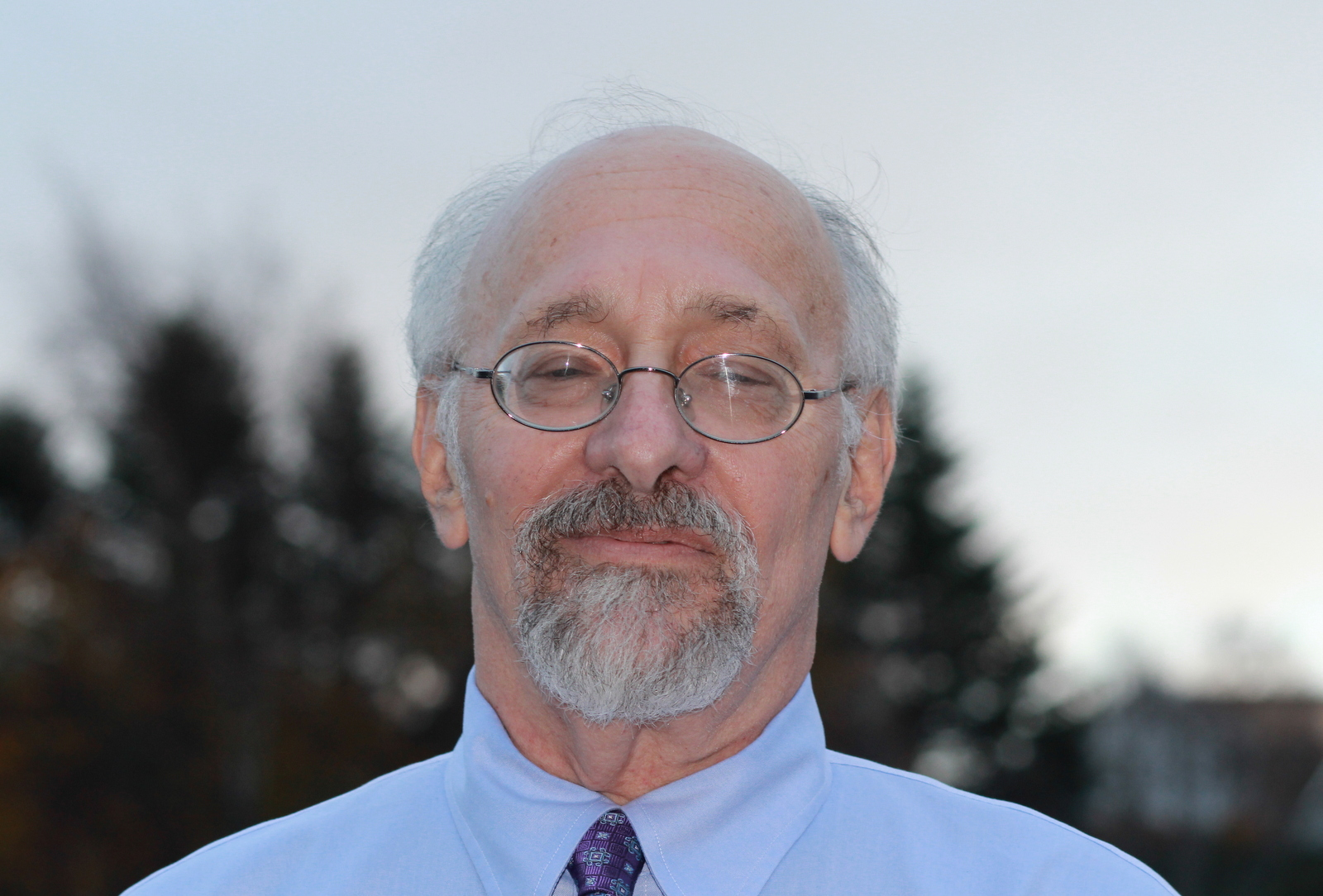
- Allan Schore at Schizofrenidagene in Stavanger 2013
- Born: February 20, 1943 (age 83); New York City
- Education: University of Pittsburgh
- Scientific career
- Fields: Neuropsychology, psychoanalysis
- Workplaces: University of California, Los Angeles

Allan N. Schore (/ʃɔːr/; born February 20, 1943) is an American psychologist and researcher in the field of neuropsychology.

Schore works at the Department of Psychiatry and Biobehavioral Sciences, UCLA David Geffen School of Medicine, and at the UCLA Center for Culture, Brain, and Development.

He is the author of Affect Regulation and the Origin of the Self as well as Affect Dysregulation and Disorders of the Self and Affect Regulation and the Repair of the Self, and numerous articles and chapters. Schore is Editor of the Norton Series on Interpersonal Neurobiology, and on the editorial staff of several journals.

== Work ==
=== Fields ===
His research has focused on affective neuroscience, neuropsychiatry, trauma theory, developmental psychology, attachment theory, pediatrics, infant mental health, psychoanalysis, psychotherapy, and behavioral biology.

He has worked on effects of early trauma including in animals, and using brain development using neuroimaging to study the effects of attachment. He also works on borderline personality disorder. He works as a psychotherapist. He leads Study Groups in Developmental Affective Neuroscience & Clinical Practice in Los Angeles, Berkeley, Portland, Seattle, Boulder, Austin and Albuquerque, and was a member of the Commission on Children at Risk for the Report on Children and Civil Society, "Hardwired to Connect".

According to Google Scholar, Schore has been cited over 20,000 times in scientific literature.

=== Adaption, and Regulation of Affect ===
A major interest of Schore's is the connection between the adaptation and regulation of affect, and its biopsychosocial underpinnings. On this he has written:

"If…an infant, especially one born with a genetically-encoded altered neurophysiologic reactivity, does not have adequate experiences of being part of an open dynamic system with an emotionally responsive adult human, its corticolimbic organization will be poorly capable of coping with the stressful chaotic dynamics that are inherent in all human relationships. Such a system tends to become static and closed, and invested in defensive structures to guard against anticipated interactive assaults that potentially trigger disorganizing and emotionally painful psychobiological states. Due to its avoidance of novel situations and diminished capacity to cope with challenging situations, it does not expose itself to new socioemotional learning experiences that are required for the continuing experience-dependent growth of the right brain. This structural limitation, in turn, negatively impacts the future trajectory of self-organization."

== Main Publications ==
- Affect Regulation and the Origin of the Self. The Neurobiology of Emotional Development (originally published in 1994; Routledge, London & New York, 2003) ISBN 0-8058-3459-1
- Affect Dysregulation and Disorders of the Self (W.W. Norton & Company, New York, 2003).
- Affect Regulation and Repair of the Self (W.W. Norton & Company, New York, 2003).
- The Science of the Art of Psychotherapy (W.W. Norton & Company, New York, 2012). ISBN 978-0393706642
- Modern Attachment Theory. The Central Role of Affect Regulation in Development and Treatment (Clinical Social Work Journal, 2008; 36: 9-20). DOI 10.1007/s10615-007-0111-7
- Dysregulation of the right brain: a fundamental mechanism of traumatic attachment and the psychopathogenesis of posttraumatic stress disorder (Australian and New Zealand Journal of Psychiatry, 2002; 36: 9–30).
- Advances in Neuropsychoanalysis, Attachment Theory, and Trauma Research: Implications for Self Psychology (Psychoanalytic Inquiry, 2002; 22(3): 433-484).
- The Development of the Unconscious Mind (Norton Series on Interpersonal Neurobiology; W.W. Norton & Company, New York, 2019).
- Right Brain Psychotherapy (Norton Series on Interpersonal Neurobiology; W.W. Norton & Company, New York, 2019).
