= Ian Hodder =

British archaeologist

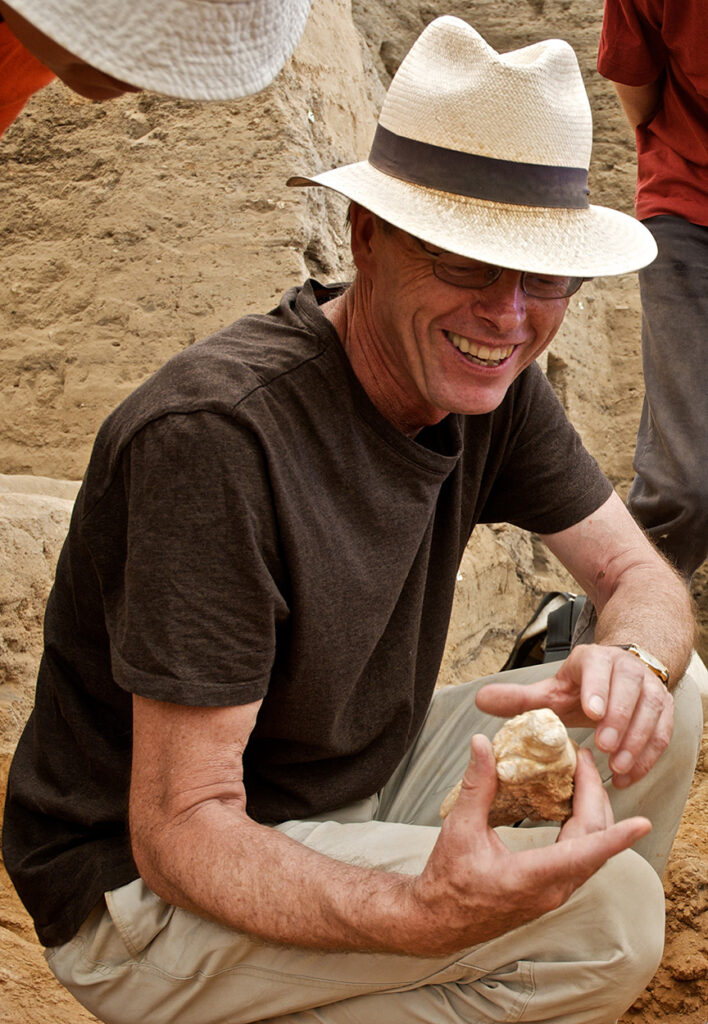
- Hodder at Çatalhöyük, 2003
- Born: 23 November 1948 (age 77); Bristol, England
- Citizenship: British
- Education: University of London; Peterhouse, Cambridge
- Known for: Pioneering post-processual archaeology
- Spouse(s): Francoise Hivernel 1975-1984, Christine Hastorf -2009
- Scientific career
- Fields: Archaeology, Anthropology
- Workplaces: University of Leeds; University of Cambridge; Darwin College, Cambridge; Stanford University

Ian Richard Hodder CMG FBA (born 23 November 1948, in Bristol) is a British archaeologist and academic, noted as a pioneer of post-processual archaeological theory and for his long-term excavation and research at Çatalhöyük in Turkey. He is Dunlevie Family Professor Emeritus at the Stanford University Department of Anthropology and a professor (part-time) in the Archaeology and History of Art Department at Koç University in Istanbul.

== Early life and education ==
Hodder was born on 23 November 1948 in Bristol, England, to Professor Bramwell William "Dick" Hodder and his wife Noreen Victoria Hodder. He was brought up in Singapore and in Oxford, England. He was educated at Magdalen College School, Oxford, then an all-boys private school.

He studied prehistoric archaeology at the Institute of Archaeology of the University of London, graduating with a first class Bachelor of Arts (BA) in 1971. He then studied at Peterhouse, Cambridge, and was awarded a Doctor of Philosophy (PhD) degree by the University of Cambridge in 1975: his supervisor was David L. Clarke and his thesis was titled "Some Applications of Spatial Analysis in Archaeology".

== Academic career ==
He was a lecturer at the University of Leeds from 1974 to 1977. He then returned to the University of Cambridge, where he was an assistant lecturer (1977 to 1981) and then lecturer (1981 to 1990) in archaeology. From 1990 to 2000, he was director of the Cambridge Archaeological Unit and a Fellow of Darwin College, Cambridge. The university appointed him Reader in Prehistory in 1990 and Professor of Archaeology in 1996.

In 1999, Hodder moved to Stanford University in the United States. He became Dunlevie Family Professor in 2002.

From 1993 - 2018, Hodder and an international team of archaeologists carried out new research and excavation of the 9,000-year-old Neolithic site of Çatalhöyük in central Anatolia (modern Turkey). He was the Director of the Çatalhöyük Archaeological Project which aimed to conserve the site, put it into context, and present it to the public. He endeavoured to explore the effects of reflexive methods in archaeology, which included providing each excavator with the opportunity to record his or her own individual interpretation of the site and involving more people in the primary recording of the data. In 2012 he dismissed Some of the team, replacing them with other excavators and specialists, citing a need for a "shake up." His permit was completed in 2018 when handed over the site to a Turkish team.

== Awards ==
Hodder has received numerous prizes and honours, including the Oscar Montelius Medal from the Swedish Society of Antiquaries, the Huxley Memorial Medal from the Royal Anthropological Institute, the Fyssen Prize in Paris, the Gold Medal for Distinguished Archaeological Achievement from the Archaeological Institute of America, and honorary degrees from Bristol and Leiden universities. In the 2019 Queen’s Birthday Honours, he was appointed Companion of the Order of St Michael and St George (CMG) for services to archaeology and UK–Turkey relations.

== Research ==
=== Post-processual archaeology ===
Hodder is known as a leading figure in the development of post-processual archaeological theory, a reaction to processual archaeology that emphasises that interpretations of the past are socially contextual and that culture is actively and meaningfully constructed by knowledgeable agents.

His work in this area argued that archaeology must incorporate social theory and reflexive methods to understand the cultural and symbolic dimensions of past societies rather than simply relying on scientific positivism. His 1986 book Reading the Past applied these interpretive approaches to archaeological evidence and became a foundational text for post-processual thought, developing ideas about multivocality, reflexivity, and the importance of documenting archaeological interpretation as a contextualised act.

=== Çatalhöyük and reflexive methodology ===
Beginning in 1993 Hodder directed the international Çatalhöyük Research Project at the Neolithic site of Çatalhöyük in central Turkey, one of the earliest and most complex known human settlements. The project aimed to understand the social, economic, and symbolic contexts of the settlement’s art, architecture, and material culture using innovative reflexive excavation methods that engaged multiple perspectives and documented the process of archaeological interpretation. Hodder’s reflexive approach encouraged multiple interpretations from excavators and sought to challenge traditional assumptions about objectivity in archaeological practice. It became one of the most sustained attempts to integrate contemporary social theory with field methodology in archaeology.

=== Entanglement theory and materiality ===
Through work at Çatalhöyük and subsequent theoretical reflection, Hodder developed ideas about human–thing entanglement, arguing that humans and material things are interdependent and co-constitutive in shaping history and cultural evolution. This concept was elaborated in his 2012 book Entangled: An Archaeology of the Relationships between Humans and Things and later editions, which explore how dependencies between humans and things can structure social life and evolutionary pathways.

=== Archaeological publications ===
Hodder’s other major authored works include Symbols in Action (1982), The Domestication of Europe (1990), The Archaeological Process (1999), and The Leopard’s Tale: Revealing the Mysteries of Çatalhöyük (2006). These publications span theoretical developments, methodological debates, and detailed interpretations of prehistoric societies.

=== Fieldwork and projects ===
Hodder directed numerous excavation and field projects including at Wendens Ambo, Ledston in Yorkshire, Haddenham in Cambridgeshire, and surveys in Kenya, Sudan, Zambia and Calabria, Italy, before focusing on Çatalhöyük from 1993 to 2018.

== Personal life ==
Hodder has been married to Francoise Hivernel, Christine Hastorf, and Nazlı Gürlek, and has had 5 children Christophe, Gregoire, Kyle, Nicholas and Alek.

== Selected publications ==
- Spatial analysis in archaeology (1976, with C. Orton)
- Symbols in action. Ethnoarchaeological studies of material culture (1982)
- The Present Past. An introduction to anthropology for archaeologists (1982)
- Symbolic and Structural Archaeology (1982)
- Reading the Past. Current approaches to interpretation in archaeology (1986) (revised 1991 and, with Scott Hutson, 2003)
- The Domestication of Europe: Structure and contingency in Neolithic societies (1990)
- Theory and Practice in Archaeology (1992) (Collected papers)
- On the Surface: Çatalhöyük 1993–95 (1996), as editor, Cambridge: McDonald Institute for Archaeological Research and British Institute of Archaeology at Ankara. ISBN 0-9519420-3-4.
- The Archaeological Process. An introduction (1999)
- Archaeological Theory Today (2001)
- Archaeology beyond dialogue (2004) (Collected papers)
- The Leopard's Tale: Revealing the Mysteries of Çatalhöyük (2006)
- Religion in the Emergence of Civilization. Çatalhöyük as a case study (2010)
- Entangled: An Archaeology of the Relationships between Humans and Things (2012)
- Where Are We Heading? The Evolution of Humans and Things (2018)
