= Francoise Hivernel =

French-born academic archaeologist, psychoanalyst and writer

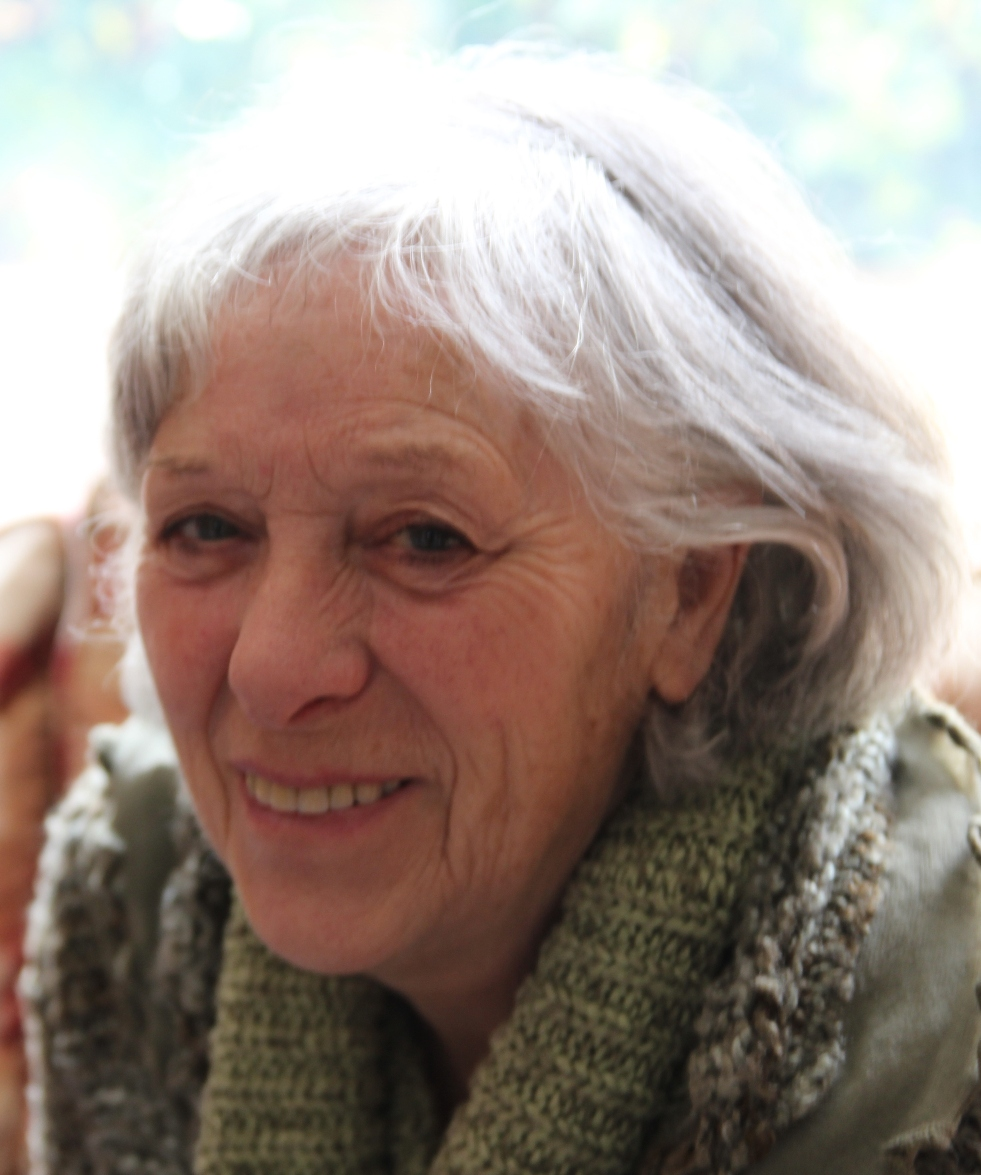
- Born: Françoise Hivernel; 14 June 1943; Versailles, France
- Died: 29 August 2022 (aged 79)
- Spouse: Ian Hodder 1975-1984
- Children: 2
- Writing career
- Genres: Archaeology, Psychoanalysis, Travel

Françoise Hivernel (14 June 1943 – 29 August 2022) was a French-born academic archaeologist, psychoanalyst, writer and translator.

== Early life ==
Hivernel was born to Raymonde Beque and André Hivernel in Versailles during World War II. Her brother Jacques Hivernel, was born in 1945.

== Education ==
Hivernel attended the lycée in Versailles and achieved the Baccalaureat, 1st and 2nd part, in 1974. She was awarded an MA and a PhD in 1979 from the UCL Institute of Archaeology in London. She also trained in Contemporary Psychoanalytic Psychotherapy through the West Midlands Institute for Psychotherapy in Birmingham.

== Careers ==
Hivernel worked first as an archaeologist in France where she belonged to the National Scientific Research Centre, Laboratory of Quaternary Geology. She dug in Ethiopia and Lebanon. Then she went to the UK, whence she dug in Jordan and Kenya. As part of research towards her PhD, she excavated in Ngenyn, a site initially discovered by Louis Leakey. She has also contributed to learned papers on other African archaeological sites and published on the archaeology of Britain. Subsequently, she worked for Cambridgeshire County Council and next the Cambridge City Council. She then had a career in Psychoanalytic-Psychotherapy.

Don’t we all live in a mirage, that of our imagination, forever reaching for something that we can never attain – something that keeps temptingly eluding us and therefore spurs us on?

— Safartu: travels with my children

== Writing ==
Hivernel wrote extensively on archaeology and psychotherapy and was published in an array of academic journals and books in both French and English. She followed the work of Françoise Dolto and (with F. Sinclair) translated Dolto's seminal book on parent-infant psychotherapy from French into English. This work brought Dolto to the attention of English-speaking clinicians.

Hivernel published the travel narrative Safartu and substantially contributed to a women's travel anthology 50 Camels and She's Yours. She was a member of Cambridge Writers for some years.
