= Howard Osofsky =

Howard Joseph Osofsky is an American gynecologist, obstetrician, and psychiatrist.

Osofsky earned his bachelor's and doctoral degrees from Syracuse University and completed his medical studies at the State University of New York College of Medicine. He is the Kathleen and John Bricker Chair and Professor of Psychiatry at LSU Health Sciences Center New Orleans. Osofsky married Joy Doniger in September 1963.
