= Ngenyn =

Archaeological site in Baringo County, Kenya

Ngenyn is a Late Stone Age and/or a Savanna Pastoral Neolithic archaeological site located in the Kapthurin River Basin, which is part of the Tugen Hills, west of Lake Baringo. It falls within the Baringo County (part of the former Rift Valley Province) in north central Kenya. The occupied area is situated on the floodplain of the River Ndau's confluence with the Sekutionnen River, on a widespread terrace called the Low Terrace, the top of which is about 3m above the level of the modern river. The site was initially discovered by Louis Leakey in 1969. It was visible as a large exposure of bones, stone tools and pottery eroding out of the terrace. The site was excavated in the late 1970s as part of Francoise Hivernel's PhD research. Ngenyn remains the only Late Holocene site excavated in the Lake Baringo Basin and in general very little archaeological work has been done on the Late Holocene within the Baringo County.

== Excavations ==
The surface exposure spread over 2ha but the eastern part of the site was completely disturbed by cattle trampling and agriculture. Hivernel dug 13 test trenches, 8 of which proved sterile. Extensive excavations followed revealing three occupation phases.

=== Occupation 1 ===
Occupation 1 was not dated, but it is presumed to be the oldest occupation phase. Found were basalt stone tools, 3 distinctive pottery decorations, including possibly the earliest record of the Turkwel Culture, and faunal remains of ovicaprids and wild game.

=== Occupation 2 ===
It is speculated that Occupation 2 was a butchering site or an activity area, however no further work was done to confirm this. The occupation phase was dated to 2020±230 BP and contained stone tools, undecorated pottery, and the remains of ovicaprids, cattle, wild game, fish and rodents. Occupation 2 also contained a knapping area.

=== Occupation 3 ===
Occupation 3 was by far the richest occupation layer. It contained pottery with 5 different types of decoration, which may fit with Akira, Remnant, and Narosura pottery wares from the Pastoral Neolithic period. It also contained some 5000 lithic objects from basalt and obsidian, and remains of cattle, ovicaprids, wild game, and fish. The remains of fish species indicate that the site was also occupied from Nov-Dec and Mar-Apr, which falls within the two rainy seasons the area experiences. Spatial analysis indicated that the area was possibly a 'home base', however, further investigation is needed before this is confirmed. The occupation layer also contained certain features. Occupation 3 was dated to 1970±150 BP and 2080±110 BP. These dates however need to be re-calibrated.

== Current state of the site ==
Since the 1970s no further research has been done on the archaeology of the Late Holocene in the Baringo District. The area of the archaeological site is currently extensively cultivated and subject to slash-and-burn agriculture. Furthermore, because of the loose silty clay loams the area is eroding quickly and the archaeology is in danger of being lost. The Ndau river is also cutting deeper into its bank washing away the archaeological material. The excavations at Ngenyn were not extensive, and because of the lack of archaeological work, it is hard to situate it within the wider archaeological context of the Rift Valley and Kenya. More archaeological research into the Late Holocene will be done by the Resilience in East African Landscapes Initial Training Network in the following years.
