= Dick Hodder =

British geographer and academic

Bramwell William "Dick" Hodder (15 November 1923 – 12 September 2006) was a British geographer and academic, specialising in African studies.

Having served in the British Army during the Second World War, he studied geography at Oriel College, Oxford and the University of London. He then began a long academic career stretching across three continents: he was a lecturer at the University of Malaya in Singapore (1952–1956), the University of Ibadan in Nigeria (1956–1963), the University of Glasgow in Scotland (1963–1964), before joining Queen Mary College, University of London in England in 1964 as a Reader. He moved to the University of London's School of Oriental and African Studies in 1970 as professor of geography, retiring in 1983 and being appointed emeritus professor.

Hodder was married three times. Among his five children and two step-daughters is the archaeologist and academic Ian Hodder.

== Selected works ==
- Hodder, B. W.; Harris, D .R., eds. (1967). Africa in Transition: Geographical Essays.
- Hodder, B. W. (1968). Economic Development in the Tropics (1st ed.). London: Methuen.
- Hodder, B. W.; Ukwu, U. I. (1969). Markets in West Africa; studies of markets and trade among the Yoruba and Ibo. Ibadan University Press: Ibadan.
- Hodder, B. W; Lee, Roger (1974). Economic Geography. London: Methuen. ISBN 9780416070804.
- Hodder, B. W. (1978). Africa today: A short introduction to African affairs. London: Methuen.
- Hodder, Dick; Lloyd, Sarah J.; McLachlan, K. S., eds. (1998). Land-locked states of Africa and Asia. London: Taylor and Francis. ISBN 9780714648293.
