= Infant mental health =

Psychological well-being of infants and toddlers

Infant mental health is the study of mental health as it applies to infants, toddlers, and their families. The field investigates optimal social and emotional development of infants and their families in the first three years of life. Cognitive development, and the development of motor skills may also be considered part of the infant mental health picture. While the interest in the mental life of infants in the context of their early relationships can be traced back to the work of Anna Freud, John Bowlby, and Donald Winnicott in Great Britain, infant mental health as a movement of public health policy, empirical research (i.e. baby-watching), and change in clinical practice paralleled both that of the women's movement and of increased awareness of the prevalence and consequences of child abuse and neglect during the 1960s and 1970s. The vast literature that has emerged since the field's origins has been reviewed in several key texts. Basic principles of infant mental health evaluation and treatment involve consideration of at least three patients: parent(s), child, and their relationship, while keeping in mind the rapid and formative development of the brain and mind in the first years of life.

== Organizations ==
Worldwide, the World Association for Infant Mental Health (WAIMH) and its affiliates are active in addressing infant mental health concerns, and work toward ongoing scientific and clinical study of the infant's development and its impact on later development. The WAIMH organizes a world congress in even years.

In the United States, the organization Zero to Three: National Center for Infants, Toddlers, and Families also plays an important role in research and advocacy for infants and toddlers. Zero to Three was responsible for creating the Diagnostic Classification: 0-3 (DC:0-3), the revised version (DC:0-3R), and in 2016 the DC:0-5 that allows mental health professionals to give a mental health diagnosis to infants, toddlers, and their relationships with their caregivers when suffering and dysfunction reach a level suggestive of psychopathology that requires intervention. Both Zero to Three and WAIMH cite empirical research in advocating the assessment and treatment of psychiatric issues in pre-verbal children. Several states have infant mental health organizations affiliated with WAIMH and Zero to Three.

These organizations publish newsletters, journals, and organize conferences and training events for individuals working with young children and their families.

The "Infant Mental Health Journal" is published by Wiley and owned by the Michigan Association for Infant Mental Health.

In Europe, IMH Netherlands has created a knowledge and healthcare network for Parent & Infant Mental Health. It combines training of professionals and organizations, with online community, and hybrid Parent and Infant Mental Health care pathways that have been implemented since 2020 in the Netherlands and surrounding regions. What is unique about this platform is that it translates the IMH vision into materials and tools for parents.

Infant mental health most often implies interdisciplinary practice that began with the work of Selma Fraiberg and her article "Ghosts in the Nursery" among other key figures. Infant mental health practitioners provide relationship-focused interventions to parents, foster parents, and other primary caregivers together with their infants and toddlers. Support and mental health care when indicated is offered to help the parents engage with their infants and toddlers and to better understand the unresolved losses from their past in order to be more emotionally available to them. One chief goal of infant mental health intervention is to attain a more satisfying relationship between the parent(s) and infant/toddler as well as greater attachment security.

== See also ==
- Attachment theory
- Child abuse
- Child sexual abuse
- Child welfare
