= Psychoanalytic infant observation =

Psychoanalytic infant observation is a distinct empirical case study method in psychoanalytic and psychotherapy training which was developed at the Tavistock Clinic in London by child psychoanalyst Esther Bick. In 1948 she collaborated with John Bowlby to develop the approach as part of psychotherapy training. It has since become an essential feature of pre-clinical training in child and adult psychotherapy, psychoanalysis and related fields throughout the Western world.

Psychoanalytic infant observation usually involves observing an infant and mother weekly over a two-year period beginning soon after birth until the child's second birthday. This naturalistic form of experiential enquiry provides a unique opportunity to sharpen and extend the observational skills of future therapists. Trainees learn first-hand how a relationship develops between babies and their family members and enables them to think about how babies grow physically, mentally and emotionally. The experience of observing family life is invaluable for professionals who later work with complex and disturbing presentations.

== Rationale for the method ==
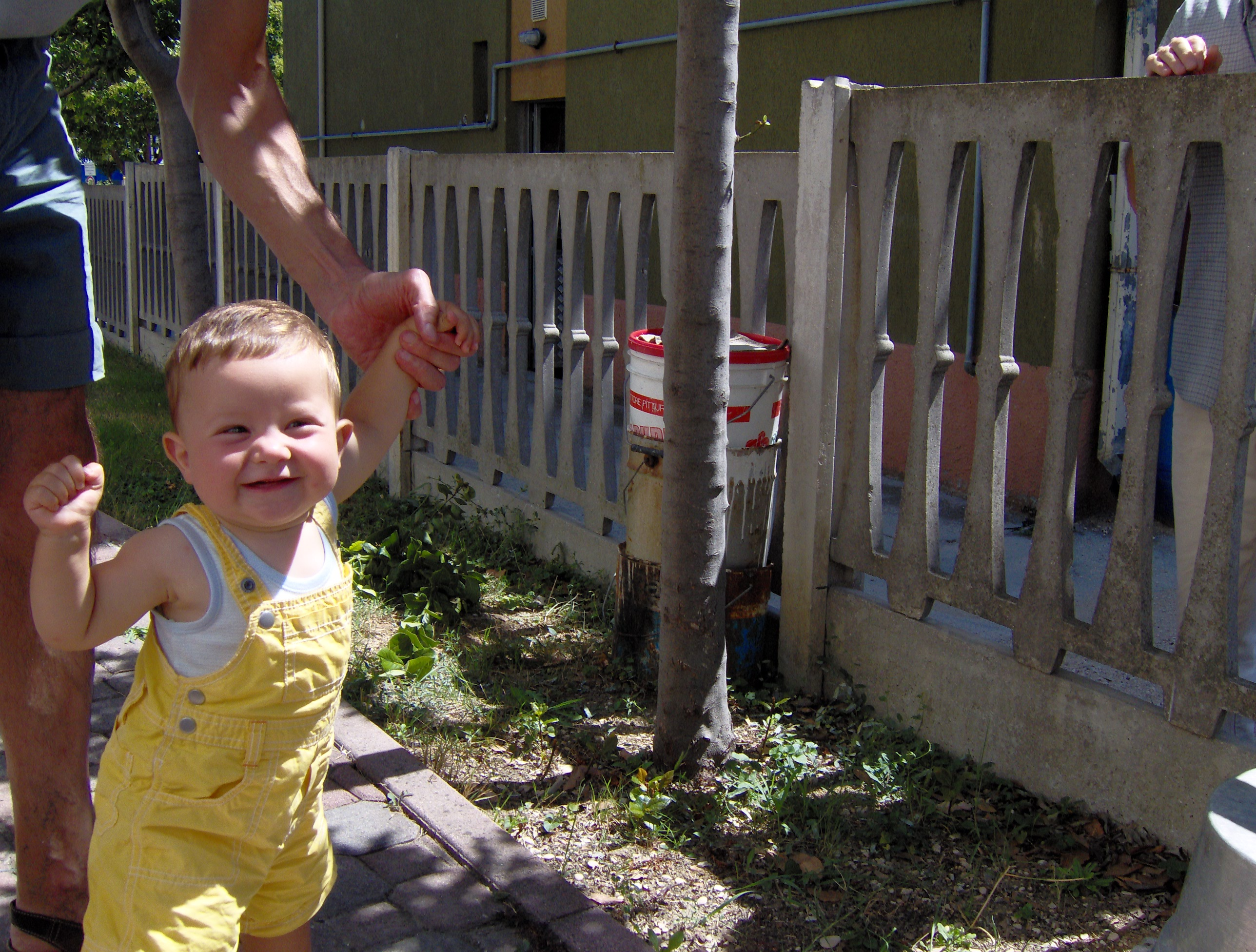
Toddler and parent: learning to walk

Infant Observation was the inspired initiative of Esther Bick. As a Child Psychoanalyst she pioneered this particular approach to studying babies in the midst of their family environment. In 1948, she began teaching at the Tavistock Clinic and in collaboration with John Bowlby she started the practice of observation as an integral part of psychotherapy training. This involved finding families about to welcome a newborn and gaining their consent to freely participate in the two-year project. It consisted in visiting a family to observe their infant from birth to two years. These weekly observations in the natural environment of the baby's home offered a vivid learning experience of child development. Observers came to appreciate the mutual influence of the developing relationship between mother and baby, father and siblings (if any). Importantly, the observer was also invited to consider the feelings aroused in themselves during the observation and how their presence in the home could be influencing events.

Esther Bick's 1964 paper ‘Notes on infant observation in psycho-analytic training’ set out the model of infant observation and her view of how much can be learned from it — how to observe, the nature of early infantile anxiety, especially the baby's apparent fear of ‘falling to bits’, the impact of maternal anxiety and postnatal depression, and the significance of good observational capacities for future child analysts. She emphasized the gathering of data over time, the need to wait for meaning to emerge, and the observer's responsibility to respect their role as learner and to behave with tact and reliability.

Bick's ideas took shape at the same time as Wilfred Bion’s work on ‘A theory of thinking’ and these two explorations of the emotional and cognitive dimensions of the early mother-child relationship are profoundly complementary. Both build on the work of Melanie Klein and her pioneering analysis of children.

== Later Developments of the method ==
Over the last fifty years courses for professionals working with children and families have made increasing use of infant and child observation as a central aspect of training. It has proved invaluable in increasing professional skills and in sensitising workers to the range of anxieties, difficulties and creative possibilities in each family.

From 1960 to 1980 Martha Harris was head of the Child Psychotherapy service at the Tavistock Clinic. She was responsible for the expansion in the number of British and international trainees at the Tavistock and for developing the training into what became known as the "Tavistock Model". The model, in which infant observation continues to play a pre-eminent role, has been adopted with modifications across the UK and internationally: for example, GERPEN in France and at the Martha Harris Study Centres in Italy.

Beginning in the 1980s, and initially supported by visiting staff from the Tavistock Clinic, courses in infant observation were developed to support the training of a wide range of professionals across the UK and across the West. Over time other components and seminars were added to develop a comprehensive programme leading to a post-graduate qualification. The post-graduate programme known as Psychoanalytic Observational Studies which is run under the auspices of the Tavistock Clinic is currently delivered in the UK in Belfast, Birmingham, Bristol, Devon, Oxford and Liverpool and in Italy, in Florence, Genoa and Milan. In the UK equivalent post-graduate programmes exist at the Anna Freud Centre and the British Psychotherapy Foundation in London, the Northern School of Child and Adolescent Psychotherapy with the University of Leeds, at the University of Northumbria in Newcastle and at Human Development, Scotland with the University of Strathclyde in Glasgow. In the US the programmes are run at the Washington School of Psychiatry, Washington, D.C. since 2004 and at Columbia University.

== The Process of Observation ==
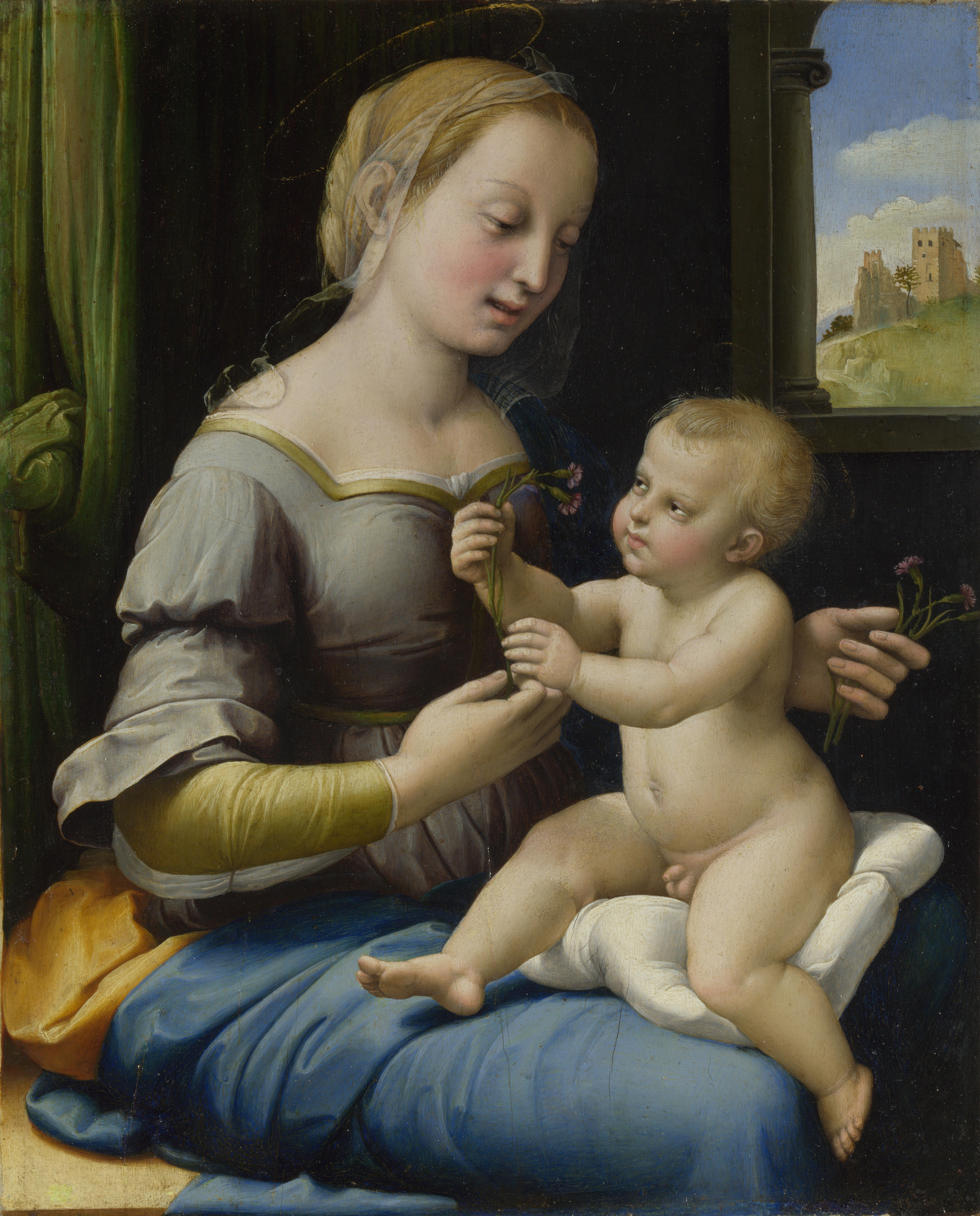
Mother and child interaction as observed by Raphael, National Gallery

Psychoanalytic infant observation generally involves a weekly observation over a two-year period of an infant soon after birth and until their second birthday. Trainees normally undertake the observation in the home setting for one hour per week at the same time in the week, to fit in with the family's schedule. Trainees are responsible for finding a baby to observe under the guidance of their tutor. New observers attend seminars to discuss the practicalities of setting up an observation and to learn about the process of finding a baby. Every observation is written up in detail as soon after the observation as possible. This can often take about an hour to complete. Students discuss their observations in small group seminars which take place on a weekly, over two academic years. Each trainee has the opportunity to present their detailed observations to the group. The presentations are anonymised and no identifying features are used.

The unique experience of psychoanalytic observation allows the trainee to observe a mother and baby, living through and resolving routine and difficult situations in their own ways, without any intervention from the observer. With the help of the seminar, the observer learns to process the inclination for judgmental and blaming thoughts which arise when anxiety is stirred. Along with developing sensitivity and precision in observation, the course teaches how to think freshly and inductively from observation, including trying to understand how the developing infant is making sense of his world.

== The Young Child and Brief Observations ==
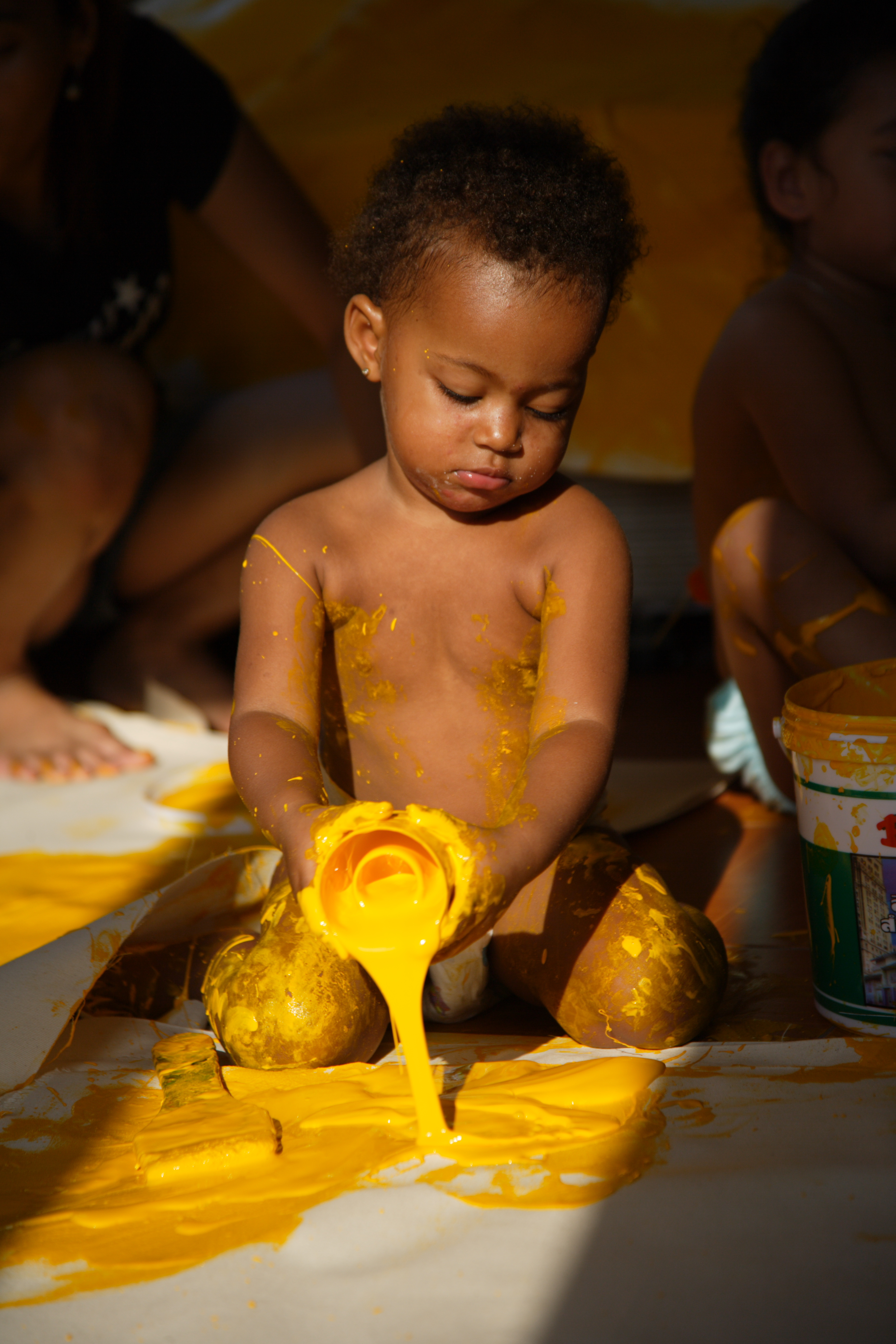
Baby playing with yellow paint. by Peter Klashorst

Some courses and trainings, including those at the Tavistock Clinic, The Birmingham Trust for Psychoanalytic Psychotherapy and the Northern School of Child and Adolescent Psychotherapy also offer the chance to undertake an observation of a pre-school child (approximately two to four years old) in their family or in a nursery setting for an hour a week for one academic year. This gives an opportunity for an additional understanding of development through the experience of observation as the child starts to communicate verbally and non-verbally with other children and with adults outside the immediate family and takes a range of steps towards the world outside the family.

Several courses provide the opportunity to undertake a brief infant or young child observation as a less intensive but still valuable training experience. (See for example Infant Mental Health and Early Intervention with Under Threes and their Parents.

== International Journal of Infant Observation and Its Applications ==
Infant Observation, the journal, is published by Taylor and Francis and the current Editor is Trudy Klauber. The international journal publishes the best of the varied and original writing emerging from this field. It comprises case studies on infant and young child observation, research papers, and articles focusing on wider applications of the psychoanalytic observational method, including its relevance to reflective professional practice in fields such as social work, education and nursing. Papers are peer-reviewed. There is a developing body of research knowledge that draws upon the infant observation approach

== See also ==
- Psychoanalytic Study of the Child
- Selma Fraiberg
- Margaret Lowenfeld
- Joel Ryce-Menuhin
- James Robertson
- Sandplay Therapy

== Bibliography ==
- Bick, Esther. (1964) ‘Notes on infant observation in psycho-analytic training’. Reprinted in Collected Papers of Martha Harris and Esther Bick. Clunie Press, 1987.
- Harris, Martha. (1976). ‘The contribution of observation of mother-infant interaction and development to the equipment of a psychoanalyst’ Reprinted in M. H. Williams (ed.) (2011), pp. 117–132.
- Harris, Martha. (1977) ‘The Tavistock training and philosophy’. Reprinted in The Tavistock Model: Papers on Child Development and Psychoanalytic Training by Martha Harris and Esther Bick, ed. M. H. Williams (London: Harris Meltzer Trust/ Karnac, 2011), pp. 1–24.
- Pines, Malcolm (2009). "Mirroring and child development". Psychoanalytic Enquiry. 5 (2): 211–231. doi:10.1080/07351698509533585.
- Reid, Susan. (Ed.) (1997) Developments in Infant Observation: The Tavistock Model. Hove: Routledge
- Rustin, Margaret. (2009). 'Esther Bick's legacy of infant observation at the Tavistock – some reflections 60 years on',Infant Observation: International Journal of Infant Observation and Its Applications, 12(1), p. 32.
- Rustin, Michael. (2006). ‘Infant observation research: What have we learned so far?’ Infant Observation: International Journal of Infant Observation and Its Applications, 9 (1), pp. 35–52.
- Sternberg, Janine. (2005). Infant Observation at the Heart of Training. London: Karnac.
- Waddell, Margot. (2013). ‘Infant observation in Britain: a Tavistock approach’. Infant Observation: International Journal of Infant Observation and Its Applications, 16(1), pp. 4–22.
