= Infant Mental Health Journal =

- Discipline: Developmental psychology
- Language: English
- Edited by: Paul Spicer

Publication details
- History: 1980–present
- Publisher: Wiley-Blackwell
- Frequency: Quarterly
- Impact factor: 1.673 (2017)

Standard abbreviations
- ISO 4: Infant Ment. Health J.

Indexing
- CODEN: IMHJDZ
- ISSN: 1097-0355

Links
- Journal homepage; Online access; Online archive

The Infant Mental Health Journal is a quarterly peer-reviewed academic journal covering developmental psychology. It was established in 1980 and is published by Wiley-Blackwell. It is the official journal of the World Association for Infant Mental Health. The editor-in-chief is Paul Spicer (University of Oklahoma). According to the Journal Citation Reports, the journal has a 2017 impact factor of 1.673, ranking it 47th out of 73 journals in the category "Psychology, Developmental".

== See also ==
- Child psychotherapy
- Pregnancy
- Prenatal and perinatal psychology
