= Esther Bick =

British MD, psychoanalyst and theorist

- Born: Esteza Lifsza Wander; 4 July 1902; Przemyśl, Galicia, Austria-Hungary
- Died: 20 July 1983 (aged 81); Redbridge, London, England
- Occupation: Psychoanalyst
- Known for: Psychoanalytic infant observation
- Spouse: Philipp Bick (m. 1936; div. 1945)

Esther Bick (born Esteza Lifsza Wander; 4 July 1902 – 20 July 1983) was a British psychoanalyst and child psychologist

== Biography ==
Bick was born in Przemyśl, Galicia, as the oldest daughter in an Orthodox Jewish family. After completing her Abitur in 1924 she moved to Vienna, where she studied psychology with Charlotte Bühler at the University of Vienna. She also became a research assistant to Bühler, in which role she worked on a research project on child development. Bick received her doctorate in 1935. In 1936 she married Philipp Bick (1904–1972), a medical student; after the Anschluss of Austria into Nazi Germany in 1938, the couple fled to Switzerland. As Bick didn't receive a work permit there she emigrated to England later that year, while her husband remained in Switzerland. The marriage ended in divorce in 1945.

Bick settled in Manchester, where she worked in nurseries during World War II; almost all of her family would perish in the Holocaust. She entered into analysis with Michael Balint in 1941. Following the end of the war Bick moved to London, where she began training at the Institute of Psychoanalysis of the British Psychoanalytical Society (BPAS) in 1947, and entered into training analysis with Melanie Klein. She became an associate member of the BPAS in 1948, and a full member in 1953. At the invitation of John Bowlby, Bick established the child psychotherapy training at the Tavistock Clinic in 1948. She served as its head until 1960, and was succeeded by Martha Harris. Bick subsequently remained a supervisor of child therapists in training at the clinic, alongside teaching at the Institute of Psychoanalysis.

Bick retired from practice of patients in 1980, and died in Redbridge, London, in 1983.

== Research ==
While head of child psychotherapy training at Tavistock, Bick came to develop the method of psychoanalytic infant observation. Her discovery of the potential of infant observation undertaken within the child's home over the first year or two of life became the foundation of the growth of a psychoanalytic perspective within the observer. It was a conceptual innovation in the history of child and later adult psychoanalytic training and was pioneered in Italy by child neuropsychiatrist Marcella Balconi. It has since become an essential feature of pre-clinical training in child and adult psychotherapy, psychoanalysis and related fields throughout the world.

== Selected works ==
- "Notes on Infant Observation in Psycho-Analytic Training", The International Journal of Psychoanalysis, vol. 45, no. 4, 1964, pp. 558–566.
- "The Experience of the Skin in Early Object-Relations", The International Journal of Psychoanalysis, vol. 49, no. 2–3, 1968, pp. 484–486.
- "Further Considerations on the Function of the Skin in Early Object Relations. Findings from Infant Observation Integrated into Child and Adult Analysis", British Journal of Psychotherapy, vol. 2, no. 4, 1986, pp. 292-299.
- "Anxieties Underlying Phobia of Sexual Intercourse in a Woman", British Journal of Psychotherapy, vol. 18, no. 1, 2001, pp. 7–21.

== Bibliography ==
- Psychoanalytikerinnen. Biografisches Lexikon: http://www.psychoanalytikerinnen.de/greatbritain_biographies.html#Bick
- Melanie Klein Trust. Esther Bick: http://www.melanie-klein-trust.org.uk/bick
- Margaret Rustin, "Esther Bick's legacy of infant observation at the Tavistock - some reflections 60 years on", International Journal of Infant Observation and Its Applications, Vol. 12, Issue 1, 2009. DOI: https://dx.doi.org/10.1080/13698030902731691
