= Martha Harris (psychoanalyst) =

English psychoanalyst

Martha Harris, née Dunlop (13 April 1919 – November 1987) was a British Kleinian psychoanalyst of children and adults. From 1960 to 1980 she was head of the Child Psychotherapy service at the Tavistock Clinic, taking over from Esther Bick, who had established a foundational method of disciplined infant observation. Harris was responsible for the subsequent expansion in the number of English and international trainees at the Tavistock, and for laterally developing the training into what became known as the Tavi Model. This model, in which infant observation continues to play a pre-eminent role, has been adopted, with modifications, in other European countries and in South America: such as the GERPEN in France, the six Martha Harris Study Centres in Italy, and the São Paulo Mother-Baby Study Centre in Brazil.

== Life and work ==
Martha Gemmell Dunlop was the eldest of four children born to Gabriel Dunlop, a farmer, and Margaret McLure, who had run her own tailoring company. She was born on her parents’ farm at Beith, Ayrshire, though the family moved to Turner's Hill, Sussex when she was eight. She read English at University College London in 1939–1940, teaching in secondary schools for the remainder of World War II. She married Harry Thompson, a Forestry Commission ecologist, in 1941; they divorced in 1949. After the war she read psychology at the University of Oxford. She taught in schools and at Froebel College before training as a psychologist at Guy's Hospital, then as a psychoanalyst at the British Psychoanalytical Society, where she was a training analyst. She had supervision with Melanie Klein, Wilfred Bion and Esther Bick, and personal analysis with Herbert Rosenfeld. At the Tavistock she introduced the Work Discussion Seminar, and the Personality Development Course. By contrast with the procedures of other trainings, she put in practice a principle of assisted self-selection for analytic candidates. The training model that was being developed at the Tavistock at that time was considered highly influential. An international conference in Harris's honour was held in Paris in November 2010.

With her second husband, Roland Harris, she developed a schools' counselling service in London, which became the Tavistock Schools Counsellors' Course, leading to special or protected time within the school setting for individual children or small groups. After Roland Harris died in 1969, Martha Harris married the psychoanalyst Donald Meltzer in 1971; together they taught widely throughout Europe, Scandinavia, South America, parts of North America, and India. In 1976 at the request of the Organisation for Economic Co-operation and Development they collaborated on A Psychoanalytical Model of the Child-in-the-Family-in-the-Community, written for multidisciplinary use in schools and therapeutic units. In the late 1970s Martha Harris invited Wilfred Bion back to London from California to give a series of lectures at the Tavistock.

Martha Harris and Donald Meltzer established the Roland Harris Educational Trust, a UK registered charitable organisation which for 30 years published psychoanalytic works under the imprint Clunie Press. After Meltzer's death in 2004 this activity continued as the Harris Meltzer Trust (UK registered charity no. 1113827).

Martha Harris wrote newspaper articles and books for parents on child development, in addition to many papers on psychoanalytic training and clinical work. Thinking about Infants and Young Children (1975) has been translated into French, Spanish and Italian.

== Main publications ==
- Understanding Infants and Young Children. London: Dickens Press, 1969. Expanded edition Thinking about Infants and Young Children, Perthshire: Clunie Press, 1975. New edition London: Harris Meltzer Trust, 2011. ISBN 9781780490106.
- (1969). Your Eleven Year Old, Your Twelve to Fourteen Year Old, Your Teenager (series). London: Corgi. Reprinted in Your Teenager, London: Harris Meltzer Trust, 2007. ISBN 9781855754089.
- (with Donald Meltzer). A Psychoanalytical Model of the Child-in-the-Family-in-the-Community. 1976, in French. Later published in English in Sincerity and Other Works: Collected Papers of Donald Meltzer, ed. A. Hahn, 387–454. London: Karnac, 1994. Also published in Spanish and Italian.
- Collected Papers of Martha Harris and Esther Bick. Perthshire: Clunie Press, 1987. New edition in 2 vols: The Tavistock Model: Papers on Child Development and Psychoanalytic Training by Martha Harris and Esther Bick, ISBN 9781780490090, and Adolescence: Talks and Papers by Donald Meltzer and Martha Harris, ed. M. H. Williams. London: Harris Meltzer Trust, 2011, ISBN 9781780490113.
