= Selma Fraiberg =

American child psychologist (1918–1981)

- Born: March 8, 1918; Detroit, Michigan
- Died: December 19, 1981 (aged 63)
- Known for: Psychoanalysis, Infant mental Health
- Scientific career
- Fields: Psychology, Psychoanalysis, Social Work
- Workplaces: University of Michigan, Psychoanalytic Training Institute

Selma Fraiberg (March 8, 1918 – December 19, 1981) was an American child psychoanalyst, author and social worker.

At the time of her death, Fraiberg was a professor of child psychoanalysis at the University of California, San Francisco and a clinician who devoted her career to helping troubled children. She was also professor emeritus of child psychoanalysis at the University of Michigan Medical School, where she had taught from 1963 to 1979, and had also been director of the Child Developmental Project in Washtenaw County, Mich., for children with emotional problems.

== Personal life ==
Selma Fraiberg was born Selma Horowitz on March 8, 1918, in Detroit, Michigan. Her mother was Dorella Horowitz and her father was Jack Horowitz. Jack Horowitz took over the family poultry business, while Dorella was a stay at home mother. In 1945, she married Professor and author Dr. Louis Fraiberg, who she met while studying at Wayne State University. The Fraibergs had a daughter, Lisa in 1956. In 1979 the Fraibergs moved to San Francisco.

In August 1981, Fraiberg was diagnosed with a malignant brain tumor. She died four months later on December 19, 1981, at the age of 63.

=== Academic career ===
Selma Fraiberg graduated from Wayne State University with a master's degree in social work in 1940. She then went to the Detroit Psychoanalytic Institute to complete her psychoanalytic training. From 1963 to 1979 she was a professor of psychoanalysis at the University of Michigan. During this time she was also the director of the Child Development Project. After moving to San Francisco Selma became the director of an infant-parent program at the San Francisco General Hospital.

== Contributions ==
=== Infant blindness studies ===
Fraiberg's research revolved around discovering the effects of visual deprivation in infants. Particularly, she wanted to look at the effects blindness had on ego development and organization of experience in infants. One infant that was studied by Fraiberg contributed to two new findings. The infant, Toni, was considered normal blind, as defined by Fraiberg. Prior to these findings it had been believed that an infant smiling response would only result from visual stimulus of a human. However, this was overturned when Toni would smile after hearing her mother's voice. A second new finding was related to stranger anxiety, which had been thought to only be an effect of a visual distinction between a known face and an unknown face. This was also questioned when Toni would not smile in response to hearing a voice of anyone except her mother around the age of eight months old.

Fraiberg also distinguished the importance of a blind infant's mouth as a replacement to their deficiency in visual stimulus. She noted that blind infants use their mouth as a way to perceive the world much longer than non-blind infants. Tactile perception is important to developing the difference between the inner and outer self. Since blind infants lack visual perceptions, they rely on their mouth for perceiving the world well into their second year of life. This results in failure of differentiating between the self and non-self in blind infants at a normal age.

=== Mental health treatment for children ===
Fraiberg was a part of developing new techniques for mental health treatment of young children. One technique she proposed was called "kitchen table therapy", by which she would go into the homes of parents with young children, typically under the age of two. There are three different approaches to kitchen table therapy: brief crisis intervention, developmental guidance-support treatment, and infant-parent psychotherapy. Each type of therapy is used for different situations, depending on where Fraiberg or her colleagues thought the problems in the parent/child development relationship were stemming from. Brief crisis intervention was used when there was few, specific, situational events that resulted in a lack of helping the child develop. Developmental guidance-support treatment is used in situations where the baby may have a chronic illness or disorder and the parents are struggling to find a way to move beyond that problem. This therapy technique is used when parents are still capable of being good parents, but simply need assistance in how to practice that. Infant-parent psychotherapy is used when the parents have their own struggles from their past which prevent them from developing an attachment with their child. The main goal of this technique is to rid the parents of their problem so it does not transfer onto the child. The purpose of these three types of therapy is to prevent development and attachment delays in children. These therapy techniques combine psychoanalysis, psychiatry, and social work practices to help parents and children establish foundations for development and attachment in the child's first few years of life.

=== Evocative memory ===
Fraiberg coined the phrase evocative memory to describe the phenomenon of remembering a person without needing a tangible object to refresh one’s memory, and asserted that this form of memory starts in children at about the age of eighteen months. She suggested, “following Piaget, that a distinction between "recognition memory" and "evocative memory" may clarify usage in psychoanalytic studies.”

== Psychoanalysis ==
Fraiberg's work is said to have paralleled that of Anna Freud, a pioneer in child psychoanalysis. Both were keenly interested in young blind people. For 15 years Professor Fraiberg studied the development of children who were blind from birth, and this led to her writing Insights From the Blind: Comparative Studies of Blind and Sighted Infants, published in 1977. In the same year, she wrote Every Child's Birthright: In Defense of Mothering, a study of the early mother-child relationship in which she argued that all subsequent development is based on the quality of the child's first attachments.

She studied infants with congenital blindness in the 1970s. She found that blind babies had three problems to overcome: learning to recognize parents from sound alone, learning about permanence of objects, and acquiring a typical or healthy self-image. She also found that vision acts as a way of pulling other sensory modalities together and without sight babies are delayed. In addition to her work with blind babies, she also was one of the founders of the field of infant mental health and developed mental health treatment approaches for infants, toddlers and their families. Her work on intergenerational transmission of trauma such as described in her landmark paper entitled "Ghosts in the Nursery" has had an important influence on the work of living psychoanalysts and clinical researchers such as Alicia Lieberman and Daniel Schechter Her seminal contribution to childhood development, "The Magic Years", is still in use by students of childhood development and early childhood education throughout the United States. The Magic Years, which deals with early childhood and has been translated into 11 languages, was written when she was teaching at the Tulane Medical School in New Orleans.

She was the author of several influential psychoanalytic texts such as: The Magic Years and Clinical Studies in Infant Mental Health

== Legacy ==
Fraiberg coined the term "infant mental health" in the 1970's while she and her collegues developed a new technique to approach infant and parent treatment.This approach for developing infant relationships with their parents until the age of two brought the treatment into the home and is still used today. Her practice was the start of infant mental health development and is still being used today, only with small adjustments and modifications to account for changing urban and rural lifestyles. Fraiberg's new approach to infant mental health was different than current approaches of her time. However, they continue to be the building blocks of infant mental health today.

Fraiberg's concept of "ghosts" in her infant mental health studies is still prominent in infant theories and studies today. In her paper "Ghosts in the Nursery," Fraiberg said problems in infant development and attachment stem from the ghosts of their parents. The unremembered ghosts prevent parents from fully developing a deep attachment with their child that is important to their development. This concept of ghosts is used as a function of psychotherapy. The function is helping the subject leave their ghosts behind and continue moving forward with their life.
