= Child psychotherapy =

Mental health intervention

Child psychotherapy, or mental health interventions for children, refers to the psychological treatment of various mental disorders diagnosed in children and adolescents. The therapeutic techniques developed for younger age ranges specialize in prioritizing the relationship between the child and the therapist. The goal of maintaining positive therapist-client relationships is typically achieved using therapeutic conversations and can take place with the client alone, or through engagement with family members.

The term "psychotherapy" includes the implementation of educational and psychoanalytic support for the client and is effective in problem-solving, emotional regulation, and encouraging pro-social behaviors as children develop positive changes to their current mindsets. Terms describing child-focused treatments may vary from one part of the world to another, with particular differences in the use of such terms, as "therapy", "child psychotherapy" or "child analysis".

== Evolution of child psychotherapy ==
Child psychotherapy has developed varied approaches over the last century. Two distinct historic pathways can be identified for present-day provision in Western Europe and in the United States: one through the Child Guidance Movement, the other stemming from adult psychiatry or psychological medicine, which evolved a separate child psychiatry specialism.

=== The separation of child and adult psychology ===
The attempt to create a unified method of child mental health care led to the increase of child guidance clinics in England throughout the mid-twentieth century. The spread of clinics across Europe coincided with the absence of hospital care as the lack of distinction between child and adult psychiatry prevented further analysis of child diagnosis and treatment. The first Chair of Child Psychiatry officially coined the term, Child and Adolescent Psychiatry in 1973, but it was not until the DSM-III where a full list of distinct child psychiatric disorders were mentioned.

== Psychoanalytic child psychotherapy ==
Psychoanalytic psychotherapy with infants, children and adolescents is mainly delivered by people qualified specifically in psychoanalytic child psychotherapy, or by trainees under supervision from a specialist in child-focused treatment. Recent evidence, covering 34 research papers (nine of which were randomized controlled trials) showed psychoanalytic psychotherapy to be particularly effective for children with the following conditions:

- depression
- anxiety and behavior disorders
- personality disorders
- learning difficulties
- eating disorders
- developmental issues

Furthermore, follow-up research shows that in psychoanalytic psychotherapy, therapeutic improvements continue well beyond the termination of the therapy itself. This has been termed a "sleeper effect."

In the UK, psychoanalytic psychotherapy is recommended by NICE as an evidence-based treatment for trauma from sexual abuse and severe depression in adolescents following the IMPACT study.

A 2025 systematic review found that psychosocial interventions, particularly those involving both parent and child (multicomponent) or parent-only approaches, were more effective than standard care or no intervention in reducing disruptive behaviors among children. These findings support the implementation of evidence-based psychosocial treatments in child psychotherapy practices.

== Evidence-based child and adolescent psychiatry ==
There are various therapeutic assessments to address mental health concerns among children and adolescents. Some approaches are backed by strong scientific evidence, while some are not. Some research suggests that it is the quality of the relationship with the therapist, rather than the particular form of therapeutic intervention, that is the strongest factor in helping change develop.

=== Parent–infant psychotherapy ===
If the normal course of secure attachment between parent and infant is disrupted, parent–infant psychotherapy is a catch-all term to describe psychotherapies that either aim to restore this bond or to work with vulnerable parents to overcome disruption and prevent further occurrence. Examples of this kind of therapy include, "Watch, Wait, Wonder," and psychoanalytic parent-infant psychotherapy. Many of these techniques require a three-way relationship between the parent, child, and therapist. During therapy sessions, the parent may express their thoughts and feelings which are based on a combination of factors including:

1. The parent's experiences as a child
2. The parent's expectations and hopes for the child's future
3. The relationships the parent has with other people

The therapist's role is as an observer and an interpreter of the interaction between the infant and the parent. They might share some of their thoughts about the behavior of the child with the parent and by doing so offering the parent an alternative way of experiencing the child. This technique helps the parent to resolve issues with their own infancy-experiences in order to restore secure attachment with the infant. And it helps lower the risk for psychopathological developments of the child in the future.

== Group art therapy ==
Group art therapy gives children a safe and supportive environment to access and express emotions through a creative medium in the presence of a therapist. For children who have diffcultiy finding words for their experiences, art offers a nonverbal form of communication that may support emotional expression, relationships, and social skills. Art therapy, generally refers to therapeutic work involving art making within a professional therapeutic relationship.

How Art Therapy May Help

Eight mechanisms of change have been identified in group art therapy:

1. Expression to reveal what's inside
2. Becoming aware of oneself
3. Forming a narrative of life
4. Integrative activation of the brain through experience
5. Exploration and/or reflection
6. Use of specific of the art materials and techniques
7. Practicing and/or learning skills
8. Providing an accessible, positive and safe intervention through art materials

These mechanisms involve both the group process and therapeutic alliance. Research further suggests that art making may provide opportunities for:

- Emotional expression and meaning making
- Self - awareness and confidence
- Coping and emotional regulation
- Relationships and social skills
- Creative exploration

The Group and the Therapist

The therapist and other group members contribute to the therapeutic experience. Therapists may use three approaches:

- Non-directive: allowing greater freedom for self-exploration
- Directive: providing structure through prompts, questions, or activities
- Eclectic: combining freedom and structure according to the child's needs

The level of guidance may vary with the child's developmental, emotional, communication, sensory, physical, and learning needs.

Art therapy may incorporate different psychological approached depending on the intervention and needs of the child, including:

- psychoeducation;
- mindfulness;
- psychoanalytic approaches; and
- cognitive analytic theories.

Developmental and Individual Needs

Activities and materials can be adapted to children's development, communication, learning, physical, and sensory needs. Children do not need to create polished artwork to participate, and different materials may encourage different forms of expression and engagement.

Populations

Art therapy has been studied with children experiencing:

- trauma, grief, or PTSD;
- learning differences or disabilities;
- developmental and neurodevelopmental differences;
- anxiety, depression, and other mental health concerns
- medical, chronic, or complex health conditions
- involvement in the juvenile justice system
- no diagnosed conditions

Cultural Considerations

Children's cultural, family, developmental, communication, disability, sensory, and health experiences may influence their participation in art therapy. Activities should therefore be responsive to individual and cultural contexts, although research specifically examining cultural differences remains limited.

Future Directions

Art therapy is a promising approach with a developing evidence base for supporting emotional, social, and coping needs. However, differences in study methods and outcomes limit conclusions about its effectiveness. Further research should examine long-term outcomes, cultural and developmental differences, mechanisms of change, caregiver involvement, and individual adaptions.

== Parent–child interaction therapy (PCIT) ==
Parent–child interaction therapy is meant to assist parents whom have children ages 2–7 years old who are prone to disruptive behaviors and emotional difficulties. Parent–child therapy utilizing two stages, each possessing their own goals and characteristics to create this approach. Beginning with child-directed interaction (CDI), parents learn skills such as praise, verbal reflection, imitation, behavioral description, and enjoyment, to achieve the goal of warm and secure parenting styles. Parent-Directed interaction (PDI), the second phase, seeks to decrease the original disruptive behaviors exhibited by the child. Both phases are designed to be coached by the therapist via another room while the parent interacts with their child. This review found that certain cultural values may impede or contribute to the progress of this approach.

== Challenges of child psychotherapy ==
=== Disregarding suppressed behaviors ===
Therapeutic interventions among children and adolescents are subject to specific challenges, many of which stem from the reliance of family members as a result of the clients lack of independency at the current stage in their lives. Unlike adult psychotherapy, it is rare for a client to seek treatment themselves in child psychotherapy. The involvement of parents in treatment referral often leads to the frequent disregard suppressed behavioral or emotional problems such as anxiety and depression with the majority of referrals relating to disruptive behaviors.

=== Lack of motivation ===
The child-parent dynamic in psychotherapy also has the tendency to increase disagreements regarding treatment processes. Children may be hesitant to accept the idea of undergoing psychotherapy if they were forced into it by a third party. This reluctancy to abide by a psychotherapeutic schedule contributes to the challenge of retaining clients in treatment as 40%-60% of children and adolescents end up dropping out due to demotivation.

=== Problems of reporting styles ===
Many challenges associated with child psychotherapy derive from inefficient reports of client symptoms. The methods provided for obtaining information of symptoms typically involve questionnaires and interviews that may affect how the client will answer. Important characteristics of symptoms such as duration and intensity may not be reliable if the client omits crucial information out of fear or risk of embarrassment.

== See also ==
- British Psychotherapy Foundation
- Michael Fordham
- Anna Freud
- Melanie Klein
- Michael Rutter
- Donald Winnicott
