= Child psychoanalysis =

Sub-discipline in psychoanalysis

Child psychoanalysis is a sub-field of psychoanalysis which was founded by Anna Freud.

== History ==
The works of Sigmund Freud were talk therapy and his theories regarding how childhood experiences affect a person later in life. His legacy was continued by his daughter Anna Freud in her pursuit of psychotherapy and her father's theories as applied to children and adolescents.

In 1941, Anna helped found the Hampstead Nursery in London, where she treated children for several years until it was shut down in 1945. Anna, with the help of Kate Friedlaender, soon opened the Hampstead Child Therapy Course and Clinic to continue her work and to continue sheltering homeless children. Anna was the director of the clinic from 1952 until her death in 1982, following which it was renamed the Anna Freud Center as a memorial for the care and support she provided to hundreds of children over the decades.

Much of Anna's published papers and books reference her work at the Hampstead Nursery and Clinic. Some of her more famous books are "The Ego and Defense Mechanisms", which explored what defense mechanisms are and how they are used by adolescents, and "Normality and Pathology in Childhood" (1965), which directly summarizes her work at the Hampstead Clinic and other facilities. In fact, it was her work at the Nursery and the Clinic which allowed Anna to perfect her techniques and establish a therapy specifically designed for improving child and adolescent mental health.

== Techniques ==
Anna's first task in developing a successful therapy for children was to take Sigmund's original theory regarding the psycho-social stages of development and create a timeline by which to grade normal growth and development. Using this line, a therapist would be able to observe a child and know whether they were progressing as other children or not. If a certain aspect of development lagged, such as personal hygiene or eating habits, the therapist could then assume that some trauma had occurred and could then address it directly through therapy.

Once a child was in therapy, techniques had to continue to change. Foremost, Anna knew that she could not expect to create situations of transference with the children as her father had done with his adult patients. The parents of a child in psychotherapy are typically still very active in their lives. Even when children were being housed at the Clinic, Anna encouraged mothers to visit frequently to ensure a stable attachment was formed between parent and child. In fact, one of the most important features of child psychotherapy is the active role parents play in their child's therapy, knowing exactly what the therapist is doing, and their lives outside of therapy by helping the child implement the techniques taught by the therapist. So, to avoid becoming a replacement parent and avoid having the child view her as an authoritative adult, Anna did her best to take on the role of a caring and understanding adult figure. To this day, child psychotherapists aim to be viewed by the patient as a person analogous to a teacher.

The goal of any psychotherapist is for the patient to find comfort in their stable presence and eventually have no issue with speaking whatever comes to their mind. With children, this involves a high frequency of visits with the child, possibly even daily sessions. Anna also saw child's play as their way of adapting to reality and confronting problems they faced in their real lives. For this reason, therapy sessions are intended to suspend the rules of reality and allow the child to play and speak whatever they want. This play allows therapists to see where the child's traumas lie and help the child overcome these traumas. However, Anna also realized that children's play does not reveal some unconscious revelation. Children, unlike adults, have not yet repressed events or learned how to cover up their true emotions. Often, in therapy what a child says is what a child means. This differed greatly from the original practices of psychotherapy that often had to decode meaning out of the patient's words.

== Newest developments ==
In recent years there has been a shift in analytic technique for severely disturbed or traumatized children from a conflict- and insight-oriented approach to a focused, mentalization- oriented therapy. Furthermore, the importance of parent work in the context of child psychoanalysis has been emphasized. Short-term psychoanalytic therapy which combines focus oriented techniques in the psychoanalytic work with the child with focused parent work has been shown to be effective especially in children with anxiety disorders and depressive comorbidity.
