= Elias Mallet da Rocha Barros =

Elias Mallet da Rocha Barros (born 1946) is a Brazilian psychoanalyst. He is influenced by the Kleinian tradition, and has made significant contributions to the post-Bionian tradition of psychoanalysis.

== Biography ==
Rocha Barros studied psychology at the University of São Paulo, and then went on to receive additional training in Paris and in London. He eventually trained as a psychoanalyst in Great Britain. His training analyst was Herbert Rosenfeld. He also worked with John Steiner at the Tavistock Clinic, before eventually returning to Brazil, where he has since worked as an analyst, and a training analyst. He has also worked for the IPA and the International Journal of Psychoanalysis. In 1999 he received the Sigourney Award.

== Work ==
Rocha Barros' contributions are two-fold:

- he helped bridge the divide between Latin American psychoanalysis and British psychoanalysis by supporting and overseeing the translations of various works from the British tradition into Brazilian Portuguese;
- a number of clinical papers, which often draw on philosophical or artistic references, such as Kandinsky.

=== Clinical ===
Rocha Barros' work is strongly influenced by the work of W.R. Bion. According to Fred Busch, Barros shares with Antonino Ferro the idea to conceptualize reverie, a central Bionian concept, as a "surprising dream-like image that comes to the analyst’s mind and contains strong emotional elements." Similar to Ferro, the da Rocha Barros use the concept of the affective pictogram, which they take from the work of Piera Aulagnier. In his most widely cited paper, Affect and pictographic image (2000), Elias da Rocha Barros offers the following definition:

I use the concept of pictogram specifically to refer to a very early form of mental representation of emotional experiences, the fruit of alpha function (Bion, 1963), that creates symbols by means of figurations for dream thought, as the foundation for and the first step towards thought processes.

Rocha Barros distinguishes three type of meaning, which emerge in the analytic context, and which are to be explored by way of reverie: hidden meaning, absent meaning, and potential meaning. Hidden meaning has been the concern of Classical psychoanalysis, it refers to "repressed elements", often relating to twisted sexual connotations that get lost due to internal censoring. Absent meaning results from a "pregnant pressure [...] exerted on psychic life by unconscious internal objects whenever any new situation comes up that confronts the ego." Potential meaning expresses itself in the realisation of an absent meaning.

The clinical encounter is therefore essentially creative: meaning is not merely recovered but created relationally.

== Reception ==
Rocha Barros received the Sigourney Award in 1999, highlighting his contributions to the Latin American scene of psychoanalysis, in particular in Brazil. Fred Busch has included the work of Elias da Rocha Barros and his wife Elizabeth in a group of significant post-Bionians, the other two being Thomas Ogden and Antonino Ferro.

== Bibliography ==
=== Selected Articles ===
- 1989 Le clivage dans la position paranoide-schizoide et dans la position dépressive. In: Le Trimestre Psychanalytique. 3: 125–142. Revista da “Association Freudienne”. Paris: Joseph Clims Éditeur. (with E.L. Rocha Barros)
- 1995. The problem of originality and imitation in psychoanalytic thought. In: International Journal of Psychoanalysis. 76: 835–843.
- 1998. On countertransference: a critical view of the concept. In: Boletim do Instituto da Sociedade Brasileira de Psicanálise do Rio de Janeiro. 3: 38-50
- 2000. Affect and pictographic image: The constitution of meaning in mental life. In: International Journal of Psychoanalysis. 81.6: 1087–1099.
- 2002. An essay on dreaming, psychical working out and working through. In: International Journal of Psychoanalysis. 83: 1083–1093.
- 2002. First interview and one session with ‘Ana’. In: International Journal of Psychoanalysis. 83: 569–574.
- 2011 Reflections on the clinical implications of symbolism. In: International Journal of Psychoanalysis. 92: 879–901. (with E.L. Rocha Barros).
- 2013. What does the presentation of case material tell us about what actually happened in an analysis and how does it do this?. In: International Journal of Psychoanalysis. 94(6). 1145–1152.
