= Kleinian envy and gratitude =

Concepts in the psychology of Melanie Klein

The Kleinian psychoanalytic school of thought, of which Melanie Klein was a pioneer, considers envy to be crucial in understanding both love and gratitude.

== Overview ==
Klein defines envy as "the angry feeling that another person possesses and enjoys something desirable – the envious impulse being to take it away or to spoil it" (projective identification). (Klein 1984, p176). Envy leads the child to phantasise about entering the primal good object (the good breast) and debase the good object specifically because it is good. The good object is internalised, becoming part of the child's ego, so roles are reversed from the pre-natal state as the mother is now inside the infant. This phantasy is a manifestation of the death instinct, where bad feelings are directed towards both good and bad objects, leading to confusion between the two (Hinshelwood, 1989).

Klein further defines envy as an innate "expression of destructive impulses" meaning it is present from birth, and that it has a "constitutional basis", implying it is resistant to change.

Kleinian gratitude is diametrically opposed to envy, as envy expresses destructive drives and is usually aimed at the object that provides gratification. Therefore, envy can be seen to lessen or destroy gratitude towards the good object. Gratitude is the particular affect towards an object that produces appreciation or satisfaction.

Like envy, gratitude is inborn and crucial in developing the primal relationship between mother (the good object) and child. It is also the basis for the child perceiving goodness in others and herself. "The sense of an object being available and freely given arouses care, consideration and gratitude for the object itself as part of the life instinct." (Hinshelwood 1989)

Gratitude felt towards the good object shapes the child's capacity for love in subsequent love relationships throughout life. If the envy aimed at the nourishing breast is intense, full gratification is obstructed because envy destroys and desecrates that which is good.

== See also ==
- Object relations

== Sources ==
- Hinshelwood, R. D. (1989). A Dictionary of Kleinian Thought. London: Free Association Books
- Klein, M. (1984). Envy and Gratitude and Other Works 1946-1963. London: The Hogarth Press
