= R. D. Hinshelwood =

English psychiatrist and academic

Robert Douglas Hinshelwood (born 1938) is an English psychiatrist and academic. He is a Professor Emeritus of Psychoanalytic Studies at the University of Essex. He trained as a doctor and psychiatrist. He has taken an interest in the Therapeutic Community movement since 1974, and was founding editor of The International Journal of Therapeutic Communities (in 1980), having edited, with Nick Manning, Therapeutic Communities: Reflections and Progress (1979, London: Routledge).

== Career ==
He qualified as a psychoanalyst in 1976. He took up the post of Consultant Psychotherapist at St Bernard's Hospital in London (now St Bernard's Wing, Ealing Hospital). He was Clinical Director of the Cassel Hospital in Richmond, between 1993 and 1997.

In 1984 he founded the British Journal of Psychotherapy, and edited it for ten years. In 1999 he founded the Journal Psychoanalysis and History. Around this time he became part of the Free Associations Group (founded by Bob Young and others) which ran the Journal Free Associations, and with Mike Rustin at the University of East London put on 'Psychoanalysis and Public Sphere' conferences in the 1990s.

Hinshelwood's A Dictionary of Kleinian Thought (1989) was welcomed by Hanna Segal as "a work of great devotion", which "did for the development of Klein's thought what Laplanche & Pontalis did for Freud". A second edition of the Dictionary (1991) addressed criticisms that the first edition had neglected the theoretical contributions of Betty Joseph. Clinical Klein (1994) explored clinical cases from Freud, Klein, Paula Heimann. Joan Riviere, Wilfred Bion, Roger Money-Kyrle, Herbert Rosenfeld, Hanna Segal, Donald Meltzer, Betty Joseph, Edna O'Shaughnessy, Henri Rey, Eric Brenman, Murray Jackson, Leslie Sohn, Ruth Riesenberg-Malcolm, Irma Brenman Pick, Ronald Britton, Michael Feldman and John Steiner. Both books were widely translated, and influenced the development of Kleinian ideas within international psychoanalysis (this recognised by the Melanie Klein Trust). He has pursued an interest in the application of psychoanalytic ideas in social science, and especially concerning mental health institutions (Thinking about Institutions. and Suffering Insanity; and published, with Wilhelm Skogstad Observing Organisations, a psychoanalytic observation method for exposing unconscious dynamics in social organisations.

He retired from the NHS in 1997. He became professor at the Centre for Psychoanalytic Studies at the University of Essex. In 2012, he was Visiting Professor at the Committee for Social Thought, University of Chicago. More recently, after more than a decade of teaching research methodology to postgraduates and research students, he published Research on the Couch; Single Case Studies, Subjectivity and Psychoanalytic Knowledge which addresses the complications of experiments and evidence in the 'subjective science' of psychoanalysis.

A fuller list of his publications is available at his website www.rdhinshelwood.net

== Books ==
- (ed. with Nick Manning) Therapeutic Communities: Reflections and Progress. London: Routledge and Kegan Paul, 1979.
- What Happens in Groups: psychoanalysis, the individual and the community. London: Free Association Books, 1987.
- Dictionary of Kleinian Thought. London: Free Association Books, 1989.
  - 2nd ed., London: Free Association Books, 1991. ISBN 978-0-946960-83-5
- Clinical Klein: from theory to practice. London: Free Association Books, 1994. ISBN 978-0-465-02975-4
- Therapy or Coercion: does psychoanalysis differ from brainwashing?. London: Karnac, 1997.
- (with Sue Robinson and Oscar Zárate) Melanie Klein for Beginners. London: Icon Books, 1997. Ed by Richard Appignanesi.
- (with Wilhelm Skogstad) Observing Organisations: Anxiety, Defence and Culture in Health Care. London: Routledge, 2000. ISBN 978-1-134-64425-4
- Thinking about Institutions: Milieux and Madness. London: Jessica Kingsley. 2001. ISBN 978-1-85302-954-7
- (with Marco Chiesa) Organisations, Anxiety and Defence. London: Whurr Publications, 2002.
- (ed.) Influential Papers from the 1920s. London: Karnac, 2004.
- Suffering Insanity: Three Psychoanalytic Essays on Psychosis. London: Routledge, 2004. ISBN 978-1-58391-893-7
- (ed.) Influential Papers from the 1940s. London: Karnac, 2005.
- (with Tomasz Fortuna) Melanie Klein: the basics. 2011.
- Research on the Couch: Single-case studies, subjectivity and psychoanalytic knowledge. Hoboken: Taylor and Francis, 2013. ISBN 978-1-136-69311-3
- (ed. with Nuno Torres) Bion's sources: the shaping of his paradigms. Hoboken: Taylor and Francis, 2013.
- (ed. with Nikolay Mintchev) The feeling of certainty: psychosocial perspectives on identity and difference. Cham, Switzerland: Springer. 2017.
- (with Jan Abram) The Clinical Paradigms of Melanie Klein and Donald Winnicott: Comparisons and Dialogues. Routledge, 2018.
- Countertransference and Alive Moments: Navigating between Theory and Practice Process Press, 2018
- Bion as Clinician: Steering between Concept and Practice. Routledge, 2022.
- Herbert Rosenfeld: A Contemporary Introduction. Routledge, 2023.
- The Mystery of Emotions: Seeking a Theory of What We Feel. Karnac Books, 2023.
- Unconscious Politics: Alienation, Social Science, and Psychoanalysis. Karnac Books, 2024.
- (with Giuseppe Caruso) Alienation, Conscious and Unconscious: Reflections on Psychoanalysis and Sociopolitical Issues. Karnac Books, 2025.

== See also ==
- Introjection
