= Innocence =

Absence of guilt, also a legal term, and a lack of experience

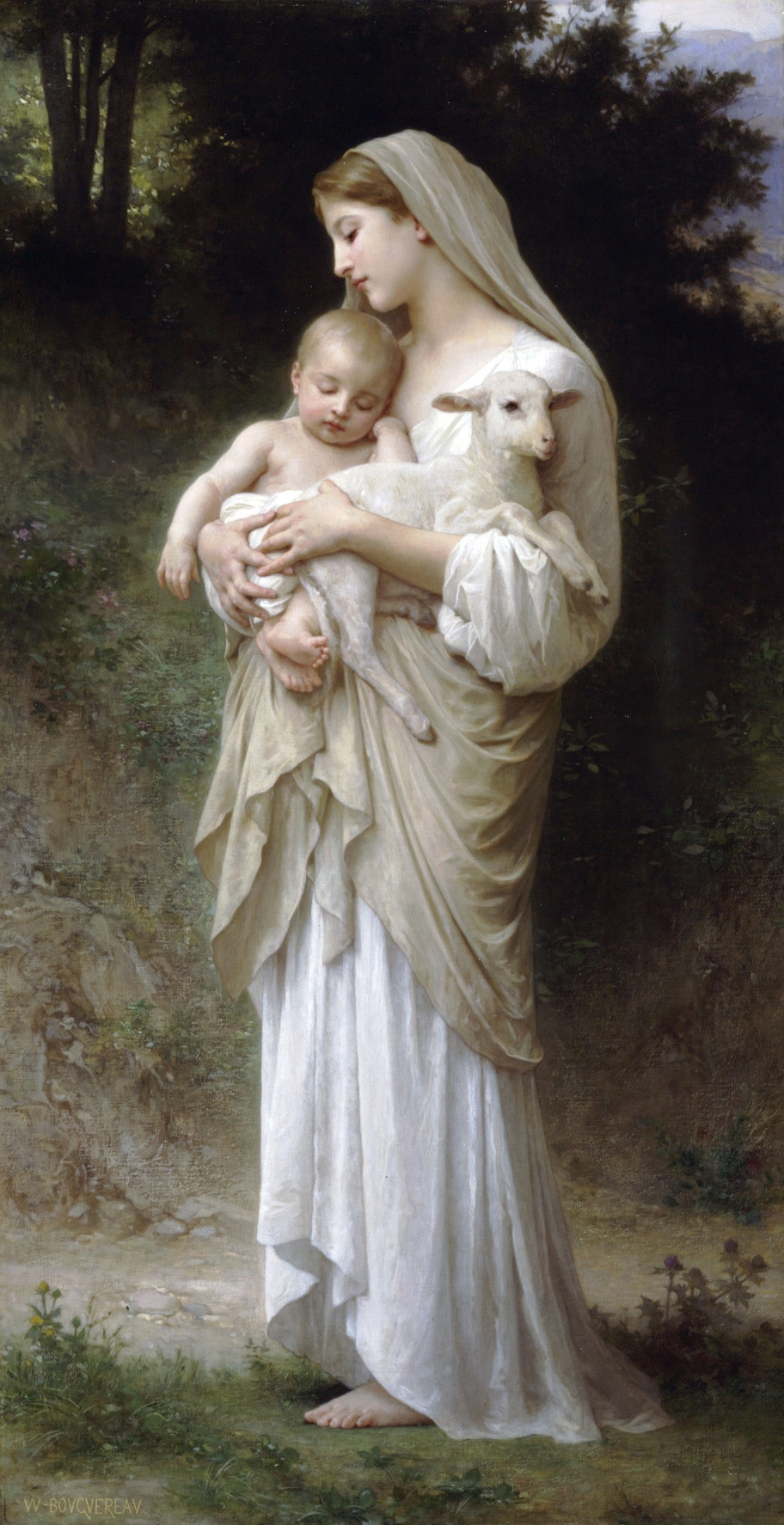
Bouguereau's L'Innocence: Women, young children, and lambs are all symbols of innocence.

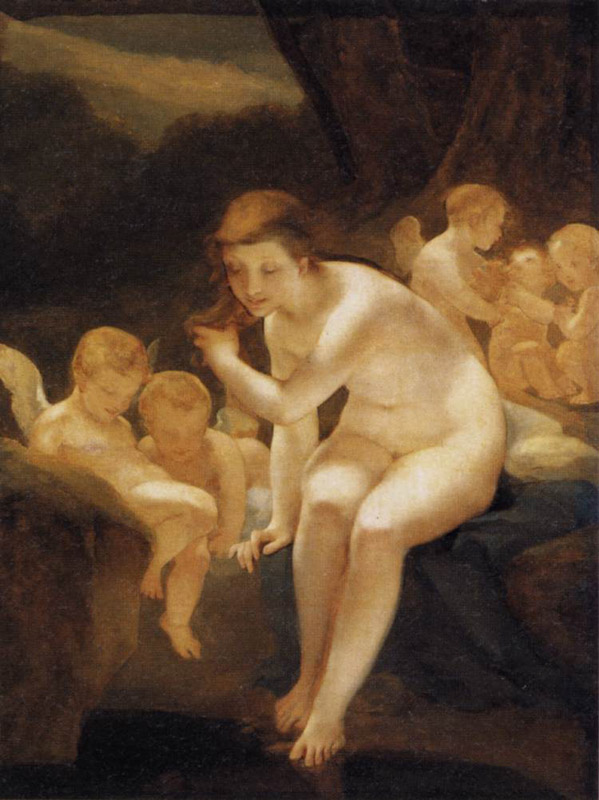
Innocence by Pierre Paul Prud'hon, c. 1810

Innocence is a lack of guilt, with respect to any kind of crime, or wrongdoing. In a legal context, innocence is prior to the sense of legal guilt and is a primal emotion connected with the sense of self. It is often confused as being the opposite of the guilt of an individual, with respect to a crime. In other contexts, it is a lack of experience.

== In relation to knowledge ==
Innocence can imply lesser experience in either a relative view to social peers, or by an absolute comparison to a more common normative scale. Miriam Ticktin has referred to this as 'epistemic purity'. In contrast to ignorance, it is generally viewed as a positive term, connoting an optimistic view of the world, in particular one where the lack of wrongdoing stems from a lack of knowledge, whereas wrongdoing comes from a lack of knowledge in children. Subjects such as crime and sexuality may be especially considered. This connotation may be connected with a popular false etymology explaining "innocent" as meaning "not knowing" (Latin noscere — to know, learn). The actual etymology is from general negation prefix in- and the Latin nocere, "to harm".

People who lack the mental capacity to understand the nature of their acts may be regarded as innocent regardless of their behavior. From this meaning comes the usage of innocent as a noun to refer to a child under the age of reason, or a person, of any age, who is severely mentally disabled.

== Innocence in childhood ==
Jean-Jacques Rousseau described childhood as a time of innocence in which children are "not-knowing" and must reach the age of reason to become competent people in society.

There are empirical counterexamples to the idea that children are inherently innocent. For instance, children with access to the internet through digital devices are referred to as "digital natives" and appear to be more knowledgeable in some areas than adults.

== Pejorative meaning ==
"Innocence" can have a pejorative meaning, in cases where an assumed level of experience dictates common discourse or baseline qualifications for entry into another, different, social experience. Since experience is a prime factor in evaluating a person, innocence is often also used to imply naivety or lack of experience.

== Symbolism ==
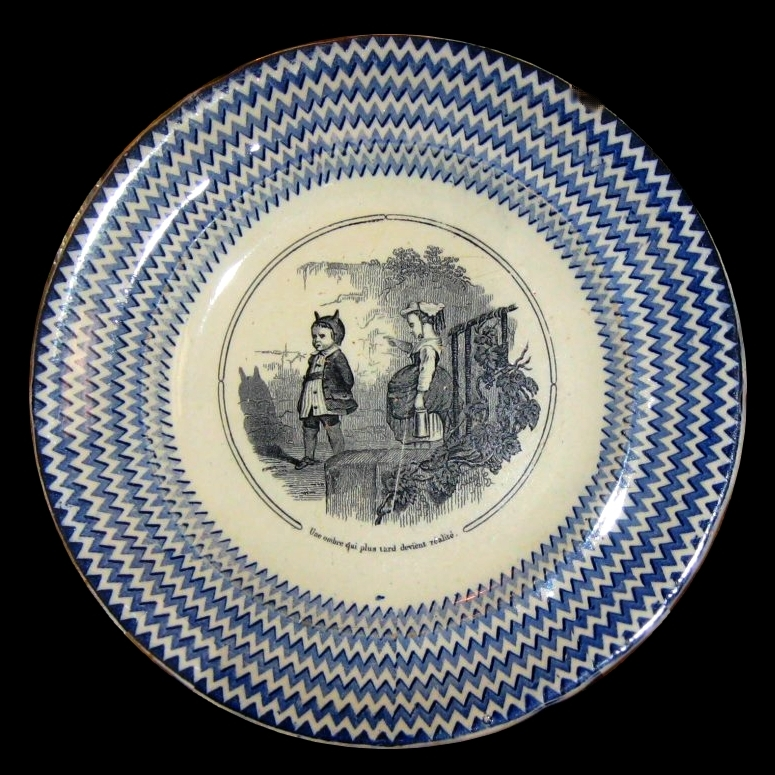
Faience plate, Bordeaux, c. 1840, "A shadow which will later become realized"

The lamb is a commonly used symbol of innocence. In Christianity, for example, Jesus is referred to as the "Lamb of God", thus emphasizing his sinless nature. Other symbols of innocence include children, virgins, acacia branches (especially in Freemasonry), non-sexual nudity, songbirds, and the color white (biblical paintings and Hollywood films depict Jesus wearing a white tunic).

== Loss of innocence ==
A "loss of innocence" is a common theme in fiction, pop culture, and realism. It is often seen as an integral part of coming of age. It is usually thought of as an experience or period in a person's life that leads to a greater awareness of evil, pain, and/or suffering in the world around them. Examples of this theme include songs like "American Pie", poetry like William Blake's collection Songs of Innocence and of Experience, novels like To Kill a Mockingbird, The Catcher in the Rye, A Farewell to Arms, Lolita and Lord of the Flies, and films like Viridiana, The 400 Blows, and Stand By Me.

By contrast, the I Ching urges a recovery of innocence – the name given to Hexagram 25 – and "encourages you to actively practice innocence".

Innocence could also be viewed as a Westernized view of childhood, and the "loss" of innocence is simply a social construction or viewed as the dominant ideology. Thinkers such as Jean-Jaques Rousseau used the romanticism discourse as a way to separate children from adults. Ideas surrounding childhood and childhood innocence stem from this discourse.

== In psychoanalysis ==
The psychoanalytic tradition is broadly divided between those (like Fairbairn and Winnicott) who saw children as initially innocent, but liable to lose their innocence under the impact of stress or psychological trauma; and those (like Freud and Klein) who saw children as developing innocence — maturing into it — as a result of surmounting the Oedipus complex and/or the depressive position.

More eclectically, Eric Berne saw the Child ego state, and its vocabulary, as reflecting three different possibilities: the clichés of conformity; the obscenities of revolt; and "the sweet phrases of charming innocence". Christopher Bollas used the term "Violent Innocence" to describe a fixed and obdurate refusal to acknowledge the existence of an alternative viewpoint — something akin to what he calls "the fascist construction, the outcome is to empty the mind of all opposition".

== Literary sidelights ==
- In Doris Lessing's The Golden Notebook, a woman looks back in laughing envy at the innocence that had previously allowed her to submerge herself in the position of the "woman-in-love".
- Ivy Compton-Burnett had one character conclude dourly of another two that "you are both of you innocent though it is an innocence rooted in your wishes for your own lives".

== See also ==
- Beginner's mind – Zen Buddhism concept of the beginner's mind
- Fig leaf covering – Artistic or metaphorical censorship practice
- Gullibility – Failure of social intelligence
- Ingénue – Stock character in literature and media
- Naivety – Lack of experience
- Presumption of innocence – Legal principle that one is presumed innocent until proven guilty
- Three wise monkeys – Maxim of see no evil, hear no evil, speak no evil
