= Robert M. Young (academic) =

American medical historian (1935–2019)

Robert Maxwell Young (September 26, 1935 – July 5, 2019) was an American-born British academic. He worked as a historian of science, specialising in the 19th century and particularly Darwinian thought; a philosopher of the biological and human sciences; and a Kleinian psychotherapist.

== Career ==
Young was born in Highland Park, a suburb of Dallas, Texas. His initial education was in the United States, at Yale University and the University of Rochester Medical School, but in 1960 he moved to the University of Cambridge for his PhD on the history of ideas of mind and brain. The resulting monograph, Mind, Brain and Adaptation, has been called 'a modern classic' by Peter Gay. From 1964 to 1976 he was a Fellow and Graduate Tutor of King's College, Cambridge and became the first Director of the Wellcome Unit for the History of Medicine set up within the Department of History and Philosophy of Science, University of Cambridge.

From 1976 to 1983 he was a full-time writer. In this period much of his political activities and writing critiqued science, technology and medicine. His contribution in this area has been compared by historian Gary Werskey with that of J. D. Bernal. In any case, Young, while deeply respectful, strived to go beyond Bernal's agenda.

In the early 80s, Young's career changed in two directions. On the one hand, he trained as a Kleinian psychoanalytic psychotherapist, and began to include writings on psychoanalysis in his oeuvre. He returned to academia as the first professor of Psychoanalytic Studies and of Psychoanalytic Psychotherapy, posts he held at the Centre for Psychotherapeutic Studies at the University of Sheffield Medical School until his retirement. After retiring from academia, Young worked in private practice in London. He was a registrant of the British Psychoanalytic Council.

On the other hand, Young became involved in the scientific publishing industry. He continued to write extensively, and also recorded a series of television documentaries for the series Crucible: Science in society. He established the publishing house Free Association Books, which Andrew Samuels called 'the most important influence on the culture of psychoanalysis since the war'. While Young directed it, Free Association published works of cultural theory, critiques of expertise, and psychoanalysis, broadly conceived. He also founded the less successful Process Press, as well as a series of scientific journals: Radical Science Journal, Science as Culture, Free Associations and Kleinian Studies. And, with the rise of the Internet, he developed a number of email forums and egroups in his areas of interest.

== Thought ==
The unifying thread in Young's research, political activities, writing and clinical practice was the understanding of human nature and the alleviation of suffering and inequality. His work was typically interdisciplinary, seeking to promote unity in how we think about nature, human nature and culture.

Young's popular false dichotomies
Humanities	vs.	Science
Society	vs.	Science
Culture	vs.	Nature
Qualitative	vs.	Quantitative
Value	vs.	Fact
Purpose	vs.	Mechanism
Subject	vs.	Object
Internal	vs.	External
Secondary quality	vs.	Primary quality
Thought	vs.	Extension
Mind	vs.	Body
Character	vs.	Behaviour

In his early works, Young argued that science, technology and medicine—far from being value-neutral—embody values. Succinctly put, all facts are theory-laden, all theories are value-laden, and all values occur within an ideology or world view. Scientists and technologists pursue agendas. They have philosophies of nature and world views, usually tacitly held. Around 1980, Young came to believe that discussion of the implications and antecedents of scientific matters, both philosophical and moral, was difficult, if not impossible. He argued that our culture is disastrously riven across a series of sharp dichotomies, each and every one false (or, at least, overdrawn), and these precluded clear analysis. The remainder of his career was devoted to fostering unified deliberations across these dichotomies.

== Personal life ==
Young's lover at the time of his death was Susan Tilley. He had married and was divorced from Barbara Smith, with whom he had a son, and Sheila Ernst, with whom he had two daughters. He had a long relationship with Margot Waddell, with whom he had a son and a daughter, and with Em Farrell, with whom he had a daughter.

== Bibliography ==
- Mind, Brain and Adaptation. Oxford: Clarendon Press, 1970; reprinted in History of Neuroscience Series N.Y.: Oxford, 1990.
- Changing Perspectives in the History of Science. London: Heinemann, 1973 (co-editor with M. Teich and contributor).
- Darwin's Metaphor: Nature's Place in Victorian Culture. Cambridge University Press, 1985; reprinted 1988, 1994.
- Science, Technology and the Labour Process, 2 vols. Free Association Books, 1981, 1985 (co-editor with L. Levidow and contributor).
- Mental Space. Process Press, 1994.
- Oedipus Complex. Icon Books, 2001.

=== Published on-line ===
- The Culture of British Psychoanalysis and Related Essays on Character and Morality and on The Psychodynamics of Psychoanalytic Organization, 1996.
- Whatever Happened to Human Nature?, 1996.
- Group Relations: An Introduction (co-author with David Armstrong and Gordon Lawrence), 1997.

== See also ==
- Naturalization of value systems
