= Jeremy Holmes =

British psychiatrist and writer (born 1943)

Jeremy Holmes (born 1943) is a British psychiatrist and writer.

Jeremy Holmes was born in London in 1943. He trained at Cambridge University and University College London. He practices as a Consultant Psychotherapist in North Devon. He also holds the post of visiting professor at University College London (UCL) and was Senior Clinical Research Fellow at Peninsula Medical School until 2003. He is retired and spends time travelling UK giving talks on attachment theory to therapy organizations.

== Works ==
- John Bowlby and Attachment Theory. Routledge. 1993. ISBN 9780415077293.
- The Search for the Secure Base: Attachment Theory and Psychotherapy. 2001.
- Exploring in Security. 2010. - winner of the 2010 Goethe Award for Psychoanalytic and Psychodynamic Scholarship - A book which attempts to bring together attachment theory and modern psychoanalytical theory and demonstrate how attachment theory can be used in psychotherapeutic practice.
- with Lindley, Richard. The Values of Psychotherapy. Studies in Bioethics. Foreword by R. D. Hinshelwood.
- The Spirit of Psychotherapy: A Hidden Dimension (2024). Karnac Books. ISBN 9781913494803
