= Richard Lindley =

Richard Lindley may refer to:

- Richard Lindley (author) (born 1949), English author of philosophy & politics
- Dick Lindley, English footballer
- Richard Lindley (journalist) (1936–2019), English broadcast journalist
