= Dan Segal =

British mathematician

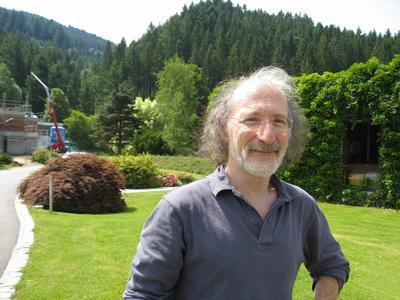
- Dan Segal in 2008 (photo from MFO)
- Education: Peterhouse, Cambridge; University of London
- Awards: Adams Prize (1982); Whitehead Prize (1985); Ferran Sunyer i Balaguer Prize (2002); Pólya Prize (LMS) (2012)
- Scientific career
- Workplaces: All Souls College, Oxford
- Doctoral advisor: Bertram Wehrfritz
- Doctoral students: Geoff Smith; Marcus du Sautoy

Daniel Segal (born 1947) is a British mathematician and a professor of mathematics at the University of Oxford. He specialises in algebra and group theory.

He studied at Peterhouse, Cambridge, before taking a PhD at Queen Mary College, University of London, in 1972, supervised by Bertram Wehrfritz, with a dissertation on group theory entitled Groups of Automorphisms of Infinite Soluble Groups. He is an emeritus fellow of All Souls College at Oxford, where he was sub-warden from 2006 to 2008.

His postgraduate students have included Marcus du Sautoy and Geoff Smith. He is the son of psychoanalyst Hanna Segal and brother of philosopher Gabriel Segal as well as Michael Segal, a senior civil servant.

== Publications ==
=== Articles ===
- Grunewald, Fritz; Smith, Geoff; —— (1988). "Subgroups of finite index in nilpotent groups". Inventiones Mathematicae. 93 (1): 185–223. doi:10.1007/BF01393692. S2CID 122967621.
- —— (1990). "Decidable properties of polycyclic groups". Proceedings of the London Mathematical Society. 3 (3): 497–528. doi:10.1112/plms/s3-61.3.497.
- Lubotzky, Alexander; Mann, Avinoam; —— (1993). "Finitely generated groups of polynomial subgroup growth". Israel Journal of Mathematics. 82 (1–3): 363–371. doi:10.1007/BF02808118.
- —— (2000). "Closed Subgroups of Profinite Groups". Proceedings of the London Mathematical Society. 81: 29–54. doi:10.1112/S002461150001234X. S2CID 121333800.
- —— (2001). "The finite images of finitely generated groups". Proceedings of the London Mathematical Society. 82 (3): 597–613. doi:10.1112/plms/82.3.597. S2CID 123105757.
- Nikolov, Nikolay; —— (2003). "Finite index subgroups in profinite groups". Comptes Rendus Mathematique. 337 (5): 303–308. doi:10.1016/S1631-073X(03)00349-2.
- Grunewald, Fritz; —— (2004). "On the integer solutions of quadratic equations". Journal für die Reine und Angewandte Mathematik. 2004 (569): 13–45. doi:10.1515/crll.2004.023.
- Nikolov, Nikolay; —— (2007). "On Finitely Generated Profinite Groups, I: Strong Completeness and Uniform Bounds". Annals of Mathematics. 165 (1): 171–238. arXiv:math/0604399. doi:10.4007/annals.2007.165.171. JSTOR 20160026.
- Nikolov, Nikolay; —— (2007). "On Finitely Generated Profinite Groups, II: Products in Quasisimple Groups". Annals of Mathematics. 165 (1): 239–273. arXiv:math/0604400. doi:10.4007/annals.2007.165.239. JSTOR 20160027.
- Nikolov, Nikolay; —— (2012). "Generators and commutators in finite groups; abstract quotients of compact groups". Inventiones Mathematicae. 190 (3): 513–602. arXiv:1102.3037. Bibcode:2012InMat.190..513N. doi:10.1007/s00222-012-0383-6. S2CID 253746772.
- ——; Tent, Katrin (2022). "Defining R and G(R)". Journal of the European Mathematical Society. arXiv:2004.13407. doi:10.4171/JEMS/1255. S2CID 216562690.

=== Books ===
- Polycyclic Groups, Cambridge University Press 1983; 2005 pbk edition
- with J. Dixon, M. Du Sautoy, A. Mann Analytic pro-p-groups, Cambridge University Press 1999, Paperback edn. 2003
- ed. with M. Du Sautoy, A. Shalev New horizons in pro-p-groups, Birkhäuser 2000 Paperback edn. 2012
- with Alexander Lubotzky Subgroup growth, Birkhäuser 2003 Paperback edn. 2012
- Words: notes on verbal width in groups, London Mathematical Society Lecture Notes, vol. 361, Cambridge University Press 2009
