= Antinarcissism =

Form of narcissistic character

Antinarcissism is a specific form of narcissistic character that, rather than aggrandising the ego, restricts its scope without diminishing the amount of self-investment involved. It is seen in the philosophy of Ubuntu and the works of figures such as Nelson Mandela, that do not advocate any form of supremacy or the elevation of self above the community.

== Development ==
Antinarcissism was first introduced by Francis Pasche in 1964 within the theoretical debate that initially sought out to define narcissism and describe its role in psychic development. Pasche described the concept as a centrifugal investment, in which the subject tends to be divested of self, to give up their own substance and reserves of love, independent of any economic factors.

Christopher Bollas introduced the concept of antinarcissism to describe a self-limiting kind of narcissist who refuses to develop themselves or use their talents, so as to maintain their exaggerated sense of self-importance in defeat. "This anti-elaborative person 'stews in his own juice' and adamantly refuses to nurture himself". The antinarcissist may preserve a hostile, even sadistic, core behind a self-effacing facade of care and consideration for others.

André Green similarly wrote of antinarcissism as a negative narcissism that seeks self-destructively to abolish the ego in its "aspiration for nothingness". This is part of his notion of dual narcissism, which is likely to be mapped onto the irreducible dualism of life and death drives, opposing the concept of positive narcissism, which aims to reach unity, and negative narcissism, one that strives toward the zero level and aims at nothingness. Green's concept is akin to Francis Pasche's conception of antinarcissism, which is characterized by an object and a direction.

== Other formulations ==
Fritz Wittels earlier described antinarcissism as the tendency of two lovers to lose themselves each in the other. He explained that the essence of love is identification and that each become conscious only in and through one another.

Hélène Cixous saw antinarcissism as the female internalisation of the male gaze – an alien standard to live up to – as opposed to developing their own selves. There is also a concept called Antinarcissistic Rhetoric, which pertains to the way women use rhetors to appropriate patriarchal discourses for the purpose of creating ethos with their audience.

== See also ==
- Idealization and devaluation
- Joseph J. Sandler
- Minimization
- Phallocentrism
- W. R. D. Fairbairn
