= Gabriel Segal =

Gabriel Segal may refer to:

- Gabriel Segal (philosopher) (born 1959), British philosopher
- Gabriel Segal (soccer) (born 2001), American footballer
