= Richard Lindley (author) =

Richard C. Lindley (born 1949) is a British philosopher.

== Life ==
Richard Lindley was born in Manchester in 1949. He studied Politics, Philosophy and Economics at Lincoln College, Oxford.

Lindley was a founder member of the Society for Applied Philosophy, and a Lecturer in Philosophy at the University of Bradford.

== Works ==
- The philosophy of mind: a bibliography. Oxford: Sub-faculty of Philosophy, University of Oxford, 1977.
- What Philosophy Does. London: Open Books, 1978. ISBN 0729101371
- Autonomy (Issues in Political Theory). Palgrave Macmillan, 1986. ISBN 0333367936
- (with Jeremy Holmes) The Values of Psychotherapy. Oxford; New York: Oxford University Press, 1989. Studies in Bioethics. With a foreword by R. D. Hinshelwood.
