= Oliver James (psychologist) =

British clinical psychologist and author

- Born: 1953 (age 72–73)
- Education: Eton College
- Occupations: Television producer; Pop psychologist; Author
- Years active: 2013-present
- Notable work: They F*** You Up; Affluenza; Contented Dementia
- Website: oliverjamesofficial.com

Oliver James (born 1953) is a British pop psychologist, author, and television producer.

== Early life and education ==
Oliver James was born in 1953 to parents who were psychoanalysts. He was educated at Eton College, before studying Archaeology and Anthropology (specifically Social Anthropology) at Magdalene College, Cambridge. He then took a further degree in Child Clinical Psychology at the University of Nottingham. He was awarded an honorary doctorate by the University of Staffordshire in 2007.

== Career ==
Upon graduating, James was employed as a Research Fellow at Brunel University’s Institute of Organization and Social Studies, then worked at the NHS Cassel Hospital in Richmond, London, in a clinical psychology post. He is registered as a therapist at the John Bowlby Centre and as a Chartered Psychologist at the British Psychological Society. He is registered with and regulated by the United Kingdom Council for Psychotherapy. In 2009 Mary Fitzgerald of The Guardian described James as a "prolific pop-psychologist.

He appeared on BBC's Newsnight in 2008, in the midst of the Credit Crunch and demanded that Theresa May, who was then a shadow minister, should apologize for the Thatcherite policies which he believed had caused the crisis.

Speaking on Channel 4's 2013 Psychopath Night, James described the credit crunch as a "mass outbreak of corporate psychopathy which resulted in something that very nearly crashed the whole world economy". In 2013 he was interviewed by Bob Hopkins of transitionnetwork.org about his books Affluenza and The Selfish Capitalist: The Origins of Affluenza.

In 2016, writing for The Guardian about his book Upping Your Ziggy: How David Bowie Faced His Childhood Demons and How You Can Face Yours, James said "There are many ways for us to take charge of our personas, be it simply by self-reflection, with the help of friends, by writing novels or creating art, or through therapy. We simply need to get a dialogue going between our different parts." Speaking at the Market Research Society annual conference, Impact 2017, he urged the audience to "embrace their multiple personas, just as the late David Bowie did", saying: "To a degree we all have multiple personality disorder – it shouldn't be called a disorder." James spoke on the subject at the 2016 Hay Festival.

James is a patron of Mothers at Home Matter and has been a trustee of the UK charities Contented Dementia Trust, National Family and Parenting Institute, and Home-Start UK.

== Criticism ==
Some have criticised James' research methods and writing and his thoughts and opinions have attracted controversy. Deborah Orr of The Guardian described his views on the nature versus nurture debate as hypocritical, "If he was confronted with a mother doing exactly that to her child, I'm sure James would consider it abusive".

Stuart J. Ritchie, a psychologist at the University of Edinburgh, wrote a strongly critical review of James's book Not In Your Genes. He described the book as a "straw man made flesh", "a compendium of psychological myths and legends", and "bending over backwards to avoid awkward conclusions". Ritchie wrote, "Few books risk such damage to the public understanding of science as those by Oliver James", and accused James of "scientific illiteracy".

Ritchie described the book's thesis as "children are born with brains of soft clay, their mental makeup unaffected by genes and infinitely mouldable by their parents", and that "DNA has no effect on the mind or mental health, whereas parenting reigns supreme". Ritchie described a variety of evidence which contradicts this view.

Ritchie also responded to a letter from James in The Psychologist. following which James and Prof Richard Bentall of the University of Liverpool engaged him in argument. James responded to Ritchie's criticisms in an article in The Guardian in March 2016, where he argued, "... mental illness is often caused by maltreatment and social disadvantage. In one study, a person who had suffered five or more kinds of maltreatment was 193 times more likely to become schizophrenic compared with someone who suffered no maltreatment. It's the same for other mental illnesses. In the best study following children from an early age, nine out of 10 who were maltreated had developed a mental illness by the age of 18."

== Works ==
=== Television ===
- Room 113 (1987/8, C4, 22 episodes in each series, part of Network 7, celebrity interviews, presenter)
- New Britain on the Couch (1998, Channel 4, 2-part series, rise in depression since 1950, presenter)
- Affairs of the Heart (1999, Channel 4, infidelity, presenter)
- James produced "The Last Day" episode of the Channel 4 documentary short TV series Short Stories, which was released on the 1 June 1990. It documented the staff of The Mail on Sunday on their final day working at Fleet Street.
- James co-produced the "Wot U Lookin At?" episode of Horizon with David Malone, which was released on the 24 May 1993. It looks at the reasons for why men are seemingly violent, and why violence seemed to be on the increase.
- James produced the "Prozac Diary" special episode of The Late Show,broadcast on 1 May 1995, as part of the States of Mind season. It follows the creative artists Michael Bracewell, Alice Thomas Ellis, Alan Jenkins, and Bernard Sumner, over four weeks, to see if or how the Prozac that they have been given, affects their creativity.
- James produced and presented the seven-episode talk show The Chair for BBC Two. It was first broadcast on 21 May 1997, with Vanessa Feltz as the first guest. The other six guests were: Paul McKenna, Peter Mandelson, Patsy Palmer, Julian Clary, David Icke, and George Graham.

=== Books ===
- —— (1995). Juvenile Violence in a Winner-Loser Culture. Free Association Books. ISBN 1853433020.
- —— (1998). Britain on the Couch – Why We're Unhappier Compared with 1950 Despite Being Richer. Arrow Books. ISBN 0-09-924402-0.
- —— (2002). They F*** You Up: How to Survive Family Life. Bloomsbury. ISBN 0-7475-8478-8.
- —— (December 2007). Affluenza. Vermilion. ISBN 978-0-09-190011-3.
- —— (January 2008). The Selfish Capitalist. Vermilion. ISBN 978-0-09-192381-5.
- —— (November 2009). Contented Dementia: 24 hour Wraparound Care for Lifetime Wellbeing. Vermilion. ISBN 978-0-09-190181-3.
- —— (January 2010). Britain on the Couch (updated). Vermilion. ISBN 978-0-09-192984-8.
- —— (June 2010). How Not To F*** Them Up. Vermilion. ISBN 978-0-09-192391-4.
- —— (2012). Love Bombing - Reset your child's emotional thermostat. Karnac Books.
- —— (February 2013). Office Politics: How to Thrive in a World of Lying, Backstabbing and Dirty Tricks. Vermilion. ISBN 978-0-09-192394-5.
- —— (January 2014). How To Develop Emotional Health. School of Life/Pan Macmillan. ISBN 9780230771710.
- —— (March 2016). Not In Your Genes: The Real Reasons Children Are Like Their Parents. Vermilion. ISBN 9780091947668.
- —— (2016). Upping Your Ziggy: How David Bowie Faced His Childhood Demons - and How You Can Face Yours. Karnac Books. ISBN 978-1782204909.

== See also ==
- Affluenza
- Office politics
