= Unthought known =

Phrase coined by Christopher Bollas

Unthought known is a phrase coined by Christopher Bollas in the 1980s to represent those experiences in some way known to the individual, but about which the individual is unable to think.

The final transference position I shall take up is the analysand’s transfer of what I term the unthought known. This is a form of knowledge that has not yet been dreamed or imagined because it is not yet mentally realized. In part, it corresponds to the primary repressed unconscious, particularly when we take into account that the unconscious ego is itself a memory of ontogenesis. This would be the experience of the inherited disposition (ego idiom at the beginning of life) meeting up with the maternal process through which ego dispositions, feelings, and ultimately structure are mutually negotiated between mother and child. A form of knowledge that has not yet been mentally realized, it has not become known via dreams or phantasy, and yet it may permeate a person’s being and is articulated through assumptions about the nature of being and relating.

At its most compelling, the unthought known stands for those early schemata for interpreting the object world that preconsciously determine our subsequent life expectations. In this sense, the unthought known refers to preverbal, unschematised early experience/trauma that may determine one's behaviour unconsciously, barred to conscious thought.

== Predecessors ==
It has been suggested that behind Bollas's concept lay a comment reported by Freud from a patient to the effect that he had always known something but he had never thought of it.

The term also has been linked to W. R. Bion's idea of Beta-elements – psychic experiences which cannot yet be processed in any way by the mind.

== Central elements ==
Bollas saw several elements as going to make up the substance of the unthought known. Persistent moods can be considered to preserve elementary but preschematized states of mind into later life; the complex early interplay of self and (primary) object may also be preserved in the unthought known; early aesthetic experience – pre-verbal – can again form part of the unthought known.

Bollas also linked the concept to D. W. Winnicott's notion of the true self.

== Systems theory ==
In terms of systems-centered therapy, the concept refers to the boundary between apprehensive knowing (non-verbal) and comprehensive knowing – what we can allow ourselves to formulate in words.

== Therapy ==
In therapy, the unthought known can become the subtext of the therapeutic interchange – the therapist's role then becoming that of picking up and containing (through projective identification) what the patients themselves cannot yet think about.

== See also ==
- Uncanny
