= N. Gregory Hamilton =

American psychiatrist and author (born 1945)

Norman Gregory Hamilton (born October 4, 1945) is an American psychiatrist and author known for his contributions to the fields of psychotherapy and object relations theory and for his participation in the national and international debate over the legalization of doctor-assisted suicide.

== Biography ==
Hamilton was born into a family of Oregon educators. After growing up in the Portland area, he attended Occidental College and completed his bachelor's degree in literature and writing at the University of Oregon. He earned his M.D. from Oregon Health and Science University in 1977. He completed psychiatry residency at the Karl Menninger School of Psychiatry and served on the faculty there for two years before returning to Oregon Health and Science University, where he taught psychotherapy for more than a decade and became Associate Professor of Psychiatry. In 1997 he co-founded Physicians for Compassionate Care, an organization dedicated to promoting education about care for dying patients. He was active nationally and internationally in the debate about whether or not doctor-assisted suicide should be legalized.

He has published three books and numerous articles on psychotherapy. He has also authored articles about the medical ethical controversy surrounding doctor-assisted suicide.

Awards include the Menninger Alumni Association Scientific Writing Award in 1980, the Linacre Award for Excellence in Medical Journalism in 2002, and Distinguished Fellow of the American Psychiatric Association in 2003.

== Object relations theory and psychiatry ==
Hamilton's approach to object relations theory as described in Self and Others: Object Relations Theory in Practice, first published in 1988, was integrative. He originally described object relations theory as having an important place in psychiatry's biopsychosocial model but as not being a complete psychology for the broader field of psychiatry in that it lacked explanations of the effects of physical and cognitive factors on internal and external relationships. In 1996, with the publication of The Self and the Ego in Psychotherapy, he added specific ego functions, including cognitions, and physical factors into the concept of object relations units in an attempt to make object relations theory sufficiently inclusive to serve as a general framework for psychiatry and clinical psychology. Along these lines, he published articles on combining object relations theory and pharmacotherapy as well was object relations and end-of-life decisions.

== Publications ==
=== Books ===
• Hamilton NG (1988). Self and Others: Object Relations Theory in Practice. Jason Aronson ISBN 978-0876685440 • Hamilton NG (1992). From Inner Sources: New Directions in Object Relations Psychotherapy. Jason Aronson ISBN 978-0876685402 • Hamilton NG (1996). The Self and the Ego in Psychotherapy. Jason Aronson ISBN 978-1568216591

=== Selected articles ===
• Hamilton NG (1989). A critical review of object relations theory. American Journal of Psychiatry 146(12):1552-1560 • Hamilton NG, Sacks LH, Hamilton CA (1994). Object relations theory and pharmacopsychotherapy of anxiety disorders. American Journal of Psychotherapy 48(3):380-391 • Hamilton NG, Hamilton CA (2005). Competing paradigms of response to assisted suicide requests in Oregon. American Journal of Psychiatry 162(6):1060-1065
