= Object relations theory =

School of psychoanalytic thought

Object relations theory is a school of thought in psychoanalytic theory and psychoanalysis centered around theories of stages of ego development. Its concerns include the relation of the psyche to others in childhood and the exploration of relationships between external people, as well as internal images and the relations found in them. Adherents to this school of thought maintain that the infant's relationship with the mother primarily determines the formation of their personality in adult life. Attachment is the bedrock of the development of the self, i.e. the psychic organization that creates one's sense of identity.

== Theory ==
While its groundwork derives from theories of development of the ego in Freudian psychodynamics, object relations theory does not place emphasis on the role of biological drives in the formation of personality in adulthood.

The first "object" in an individual's psyche is usually an internalized image of the mother. Internal objects are formed by the patterns in one's experience of being taken care of as an infant, which may or may not be accurate representations of the actual, external caretakers. Objects are usually internalized images of one's mother, father, or other primary caregiver. However, they can also consist of parts of a person, such as an infant relating to the breast rather than to their mother as a whole person.

Later experiences can reshape these early patterns, but objects often continue to exert a strong influence throughout life. Objects are initially comprehended in the infant mind by their functions and are termed part objects. The breast that feeds the hungry infant is the "good breast," while a hungry infant that finds no breast understands the breast to be the "bad breast." With a "good enough" facilitating environment, part object functions eventually transform into a comprehension of whole objects. This corresponds with the ability to tolerate ambiguity, to see that both the "good" and the "bad" breast are a part of the same mother figure.

== History ==
The initial line of thought emerged in 1917 with Sándor Ferenczi. Subsequently, early in the 1930s, Harry Stack Sullivan, established what is known as interpersonal theory. British psychologists Melanie Klein, Donald Winnicott, and Harry Guntrip extended object relations theory during the 1940s and 1950s. In 1952, Ronald Fairbairn formulated his theory of object relations.

The term has been used in many different contexts, which led to different connotations and denotations. While Fairbairn popularized the term "object relations," Klein's work tends to be most commonly identified with the terms "object relations theory" and "British object relations," at least in contemporary North America, though the influence of the British Independent Group—which argued that the primary motivation of the child is object seeking rather than drive gratification—is becoming increasingly recognized.

Klein felt that the psychodynamic battleground that Freud proposed occurs very early in life, during infancy. Furthermore, its origins are different from those that Freud proposed. The interactions between infant and mother are so deep and intense that they form the focus of the infant's structure of drives. Some of these interactions provoke anger and frustration; others provoke strong feelings of dependence as the child begins to recognize that the mother is more than a breast from which to feed. These reactions threaten to overwhelm the infant's sense of self. The way in which the infant resolves the conflict, Klein believed, is reflected in the adult's personality.

Within the London psychoanalytic community, a conflict of loyalties took place between Klein and object relations theory (sometimes referred to as "id psychology") and Anna Freud and ego psychology. In London, those who refused to choose sides were termed the "middle school," whose members included Winnicott and Michael Balint. Klein's theories became popular in South America, while Anna Freud's garnered an American allegiance. Anna Freud was particularly influential in American psychoanalysis in the 1940s, 1950s, and 1960s. American ego psychology was furthered in the works of Hartmann, Kris, Loewenstein, Rapaport, Erikson, Jacobson, and Mahler.

=== Fairbairn's theory of attachment ===
Fairbairn described how people who were abused as children internalize that experience. The "moral defense" is the tendency seen in survivors of abuse to take all the bad upon themselves, each yielding the moral evil so the caretaker-object can be regarded as good. This is a use of splitting as a defense to maintain an attachment relationship in an unsafe world. In one particular example of this circumstance, Fairbairn introduced a four-year-old girl who had suffered a broken arm at the hands of her mother to a doctor friend of his, who told the little girl that they were going to find her a new parent. The girl, now panicked and unhappy, replied that she wanted her "real mommy." Fairbairn asked, "You mean the mommy that broke your arm?" "I was bad," the girl replied.

Psychiatrist and psychoanalyst David E. Scharff has written extensively on Fairbairn's work, including editorial and theoretical contributions to understanding and applying Fairbairn's object relations model in clinical practice. His collaborations with Fairbairn’s daughter, Ellinor Fairbairn Birtles, have further informed his interpretation of Fairbairn's legacy.

== Kleinian object relations theory ==
=== Unconscious phantasy ===
Klein termed the psychological aspect of instinct unconscious phantasy (deliberately spelled with 'ph' to distinguish it from the word 'fantasy'). Phantasy is a given of psychic life which moves outward towards the world. These image-potentials are given a priority with the drives and eventually allow the development of more complex states of mental life. Unconscious phantasy in the infant's emerging mental life is modified by the environment as the infant has contact with reality.

From the moment the infant starts interacting with the outer world, he is engaged in testing his phantasies in a reality setting. I want to suggest that the origin of thought lies in this process of testing phantasy against reality; that is, that thought is not only contrasted with phantasy, but based on it and derived from it.

The role of unconscious phantasy is essential in the development of a capacity for thinking. In Bion's terms, the phantasy image is a preconception that will not be a thought until experience combines with a realization in the world of experience. The preconception and realization combine to take form as a concept that can be thought. The classic example of this is the infant's observed rooting for the nipple in the first hours of life. The instinctual rooting is the preconception. The provision of the nipple provides the realization in the world of experience, and through time, with repeated experience, the preconception and realization combined to create the concept. Mental capacity builds upon previous experience as the environment and infant interact.

The first bodily experiences begin to build up the first memories, and external realities are progressively woven into the texture of phantasy. Before long, the child's phantasies are able to draw upon plastic images as well as sensations—visual, auditory, kinæsthetic, touch, taste, smell images, etc. And these plastic images and dramatic representations of phantasy are progressively elaborated along with articulated perceptions of the external world.

=== Projective identification ===
As a specific term, projective identification is introduced by Klein in "Notes on some schizoid mechanisms."

[Projection] helps the ego to overcome anxiety by ridding it of danger and badness. Introjection of the good object is also used by the ego as a defense against anxiety. ... The processes of splitting off parts of the self and projecting them into objects are thus of vital importance for normal development as well as for abnormal object-relation. The effect of introjection on object relations is equally important. The introjection of the good object, first of all the mother's breast, is a precondition for normal development ... It comes to form a focal point in the ego and makes for cohesiveness of the ego. ... I suggest for these processes the term 'projective identification'.

Ogden identifies four functions that projective identification may serve. As in the traditional Kleinian model, it serves as a defense. Projective identification serves as a mode of communication. It is a form of object relations, and "a pathway for psychological change." As a form of object relationship, projective identification is a way of relating with others who are not seen as entirely separate from the individual. Instead, this relating takes place "between the stage of the subjective object and that of true object relatedness".

=== Paranoid-schizoid and depressive positions ===
In contrast to Fairbairn and later Guntrip, Klein believed that both good and bad objects are introjected by the infant, the internalization of good objects being essential to the development of healthy ego function. Klein conceptualized the depressive position as "the most mature form of psychological organization", which continues to develop throughout the life span.

The depressive position occurs during the second quarter of the first year. Prior to that the infant is in the paranoid-schizoid position, which is characterized by persecutory anxieties and the mechanisms of splitting, projection, introjection, and omnipotence—which includes idealizing and denial—to defend against these anxieties.

==== Paranoid-schizoid position ====
The paranoid-schizoid position is characterized by part object relationships. Part objects are a function of splitting, which takes place in phantasy. At this developmental stage, experience can only be perceived as all good or all bad. As part objects, it is the function that is identified by the experiencing self, rather than whole and autonomous others. The hungry infant desires the good breast who feeds it. Should that breast appear, it is the good breast. If the breast does not appear, the hungry and now frustrated infant, in its distress, has destructive phantasies dominated by oral aggression towards the bad, hallucinated breast.

Klein notes that in splitting the object, the ego is also split.

The anxieties of the paranoid schizoid position are of a persecutory nature, fear of the ego's annihilation. Splitting allows good to stay separate from bad. Projection is an attempt to eject the bad in order to control through omnipotent mastery. Splitting is never fully effective, according to Klein, as the ego tends towards integration.

==== Depressive position ====
In the depressive position, the infant is able to experience others as whole, which radically alters object relationships from the earlier phase. "Before the depressive position, a good object is not in any way the same thing as a bad object. It is only in the depressive position that polar qualities can be seen as different aspects of the same object." Increasing nearness of good and bad brings a corresponding integration of ego.

In a development which Grotstein terms the "primal split", the infant becomes aware of separateness from the mother. This awareness allows guilt to arise in response to the infant's previous aggressive phantasies when bad was split from good. The mother's temporary absences allow for continuous restoration of her "as an image of representation" in the infant mind. Symbolic thought may now arise, and can only emerge once access to the depressive position has been obtained. With the awareness of the primal split, a space is created in which the symbol, the symbolized, and the experiencing subject coexist. History, subjectivity, interiority, and empathy all become possible.

The anxieties characteristic of the depressive position shift from a fear of being destroyed to a fear of destroying others. In fact or phantasy, one now realizes the capacity to harm or drive away a person who one ambivalently loves. The defenses characteristic of the depressive position include the manic defenses, repression and reparation. The manic defenses are the same defenses evidenced in the paranoid-schizoid position, but now mobilized to protect the mind from depressive anxiety. As the depressive position brings about an increasing integration in the ego, earlier defenses change in character, becoming less intense and allowing for an increased awareness of psychic reality.

In working through depressive anxiety, projections are withdrawn, allowing the other more autonomy, reality, and a separate existence. The infant, whose destructive phantasies were directed towards the bad mother who frustrated, now begins to realize that bad and good, frustrating and satiating, it is always the same mother. Unconscious guilt for destructive phantasies arises in response to the continuing love and attention provided by caretakers.

[As] fears of losing the loved one become active, a very important step is made in the development. These feelings of guilt and distress now enter as a new element into the emotion of love. They become an inherent part of love, and influence it profoundly both in quality and quantity.

From this developmental milestone comes a capacity for sympathy, responsibility to and concern for others, and an ability to identify with the subjective experience of people one cares about. With the withdrawal of the destructive projections, repression of the aggressive impulses takes place. The child allows caretakers a more separate existence, which facilitates increasing differentiation of inner and outer reality. Omnipotence is lessened, which corresponds to a decrease in guilt and the fear of loss.

==== Further thinking regarding the positions ====
Wilfred Bion articulates the dynamic nature of the positions, a point emphasised by Thomas Ogden, and expanded by John Steiner in terms of '"The equilibrium between the paranoid-schizoid and the depressive positions"'.

== Fairbairn's model ==
Fairbairn began his theory with his observation of the child's absolute dependency on the good will of their mother. The infant was dependent on their maternal object (or caretaker) for providing them with all of his physical and psychological needs, as Fairbairn noted in the following passage:

The outstanding feature of infantile dependence is its unconditional character. The infant is completely dependent upon its object not only for his existence and physical well being, but also for the satisfaction of his psychological needs...In contrast, the very helplessness of the child is sufficient to render him dependent in an unconditional sense...He has no alternative but to accept or reject his object – an alternative that is liable to present itself to him as a choice between life and death (Fairbairn, 1952, 47).

The model is completely interpersonal in that there are no biological drives of inherited instincts. When the maternal object provides a sense of safety and warmth, the child's innate "central ego" is able to take in new experiences, which allows the child to expand their contact with the environment beyond the tight orbit of their mother. This is the beginning of the process of differentiation, or separation from the parent, which eventuates into a new and unique individual. As long as the maternal object continues to provide emotional warmth, support, and a sense of safety, the child will continue to develop throughout childhood. However, if the parent fails to consistently provide these factors, the child's emotional and psychological development stops and the child regresses and remains undifferentiated from their mother. The following quote illustrates the basis of Fairbairn's model:

The greatest need of a child is to obtain conclusive assurance (a) that he is genuinely loved as a person by his parents, and (b) that his parents genuinely accept his love. It is only in so far as such assurance is forthcoming in a form sufficiently convincing to enable him to depend safely upon his real objects that he is able to gradually renounce infantile dependence without misgiving. In the absence of such assurance his relationship with his objects is fraught with too much anxiety over separation to enable him to renounce the attitude of infantile dependence: for such a renunciation would be equivalent in his eyes to forfeiting all hope of ever obtaining the satisfaction of his unsatisfied emotional needs. Frustration of his desire to be loved as a person and have his love accepted is the greatest trauma that a child can experience (Fairbairn, 1952:39–40).

The counterintitutive result of maternal (or paternal, if the father is the primary caregiver) failure is that the child becomes more, rather than less, dependent upon the caregiver, because by failing to meet the child's needs, the child has to remain dependent in the hope that love and support will be forthcoming in the future. Over time, the failed support of the child's developmental needs leaves them further and further behind their similarly aged peers. The emotionally abandoned child must turn to their own resources for comfort, and turns to their inner world with its readily available fantasies, in an attempt to partially meet their needs for comfort, love and later, for success. Often these fantasies involve other figures who have been self-created. According to Fairbairn, the child's turn toward the inner world protects them from the harsh reality of their family environment, but turns them away from external reality: "All represent relationships with internalized objects, to which the individual is compelled to turn in default of satisfactory relationships in the outer world (Fairbairn, 1952, 40 italics in the original).

=== Fairbairn's structural theory ===
Fairbairn had a part time position in an orphanage, where he saw neglected and abused children. He noticed that they created fantasies about the "goodness" of their parents and eagerly looked forward to being reunited with them. He realized that these children had dissociated and repressed the many physical and emotional outrages that they had been subjected to in the family. Once in the orphanage, these same children lived in a fantasy world of hope and expectation, which prevented them from psychological collapse. The fantasy self that the child develops was called the libidinal self (or libidinal ego) and it related to the very best parts of the parents, who may have shown interest or tenderness toward their child at one time or another, which the needy child then enhances with fantasy. The fantasy enhanced view of the parent was called the exciting object by Fairbairn, which was based on the excitement of the child as he spun his fantasy of a reunion with his loving parents. This pair of self and objects is also contained in the child's unconscious, but he may call them into awareness when he is desperate for comfort and support (Fairbairn, 1952, 102–119).

Fairbairn's structural model contains three selves that relate to three aspects of the object. The selves do not know or relate to each other, and the process of dissociation and the development of these structures is called the splitting defense, or splitting.

- The child's central ego relates to the ideal object when the parent is supportive and nurturant.
- The antilibidinal ego relates only to the rejecting object, and these structures contain the child's fear and anger as well as the parent's indifference, neglect or outright abuse.
- The libidinal ego relates only to the exciting object, and these structures contain the overly hopeful child who relates to the exciting over-promising parent.

The Fairbairnian object relations therapist imagines that all interactions between the client and the therapist are occurring in the client's inner object relations world, in one of the three dyads. The Fairbairnian object relations therapist also uses their own emotional reactions as therapeutic cues. If the therapist is feeling irritated at the client, or bored, that might be interpreted as a re-enactment of the Antilibidinal Ego and the Bad Object, with the therapist cast in the role of Bad Object. If the therapist can patiently be an empathic therapist through the client's re-enactment, then the client has a new experience to incorporate into their inner object world, hopefully expanding their inner picture of their Good Object. Cure is seen as the client being able to receive from their inner Good Object often enough to have a more stable peaceful life.

== Continuing developments ==
While object relations theory grew out of psychoanalysis, it has been applied to the general fields of psychiatry and psychotherapy by such authors as N. Gregory Hamilton and Glen O. Gabbard. In making object relations theory more useful as a general psychology Hamilton added the specific ego functions to Otto F. Kernberg's concept of object relations units.

=== Extensions into couples and family psychotherapy ===
In the late 20th and early 21st centuries, David E. Scharff and Jill Savege Scharff extended object relations theory into relational systems, especially in the treatment of couples and families. Their approach emphasizes how partners or family members enact internal object relations in interaction and how the therapist's own self and countertransference become key instruments of change. Their concepts of centered holding and contextual holding describe relational stances that facilitate the emergence and reworking of unconscious dynamics within ongoing interactions. In Object Relations Couple Therapy and Object Relations Family Therapy, they apply classical object relations concepts such as projections, introjections, holding, and transference to the domain of intimate and familial relationships, thereby expanding the theory's clinical and systemic relevance.

David A. Berkowitz similarly examined how couples unconsciously reenact internalized object relations through self-protective relational patterns. He proposed that adaptive defensive strategies formed in early life often clash within couple dynamics, reinforcing maladaptive interaction cycles. Berkowitz emphasized the importance of interpreting these mutual influences to disrupt negative patterns and promote relational change within an object relations framework.

== See also ==
- Attachment theory
- Bizarre object
- Defense mechanisms
- Egocentrism
- Family therapy
- Psychoanalysis
- Relational psychoanalysis
- Reparation
- Transference focused psychotherapy

Individuals

- Otto Rank
- Melanie Klein
- Joseph J. Sandler
- Ronald Fairbairn
- D. W. Winnicott
- Edna O'Shaughnessy
- Margaret Little
- Ignacio Matte Blanco
- John Bowlby
- David E. Scharff
