= Edna O'Shaughnessy =

Kleinian psychoanalyst (1924–2022)

Edna O'Shaughnessy (26 September 1924 – 25 January 2022) was a South African-born British Kleinian psychoanalyst.

== Training ==
O'Shaughnessy trained in philosophy, which she taught at Oxford, before re-training as a child psychotherapist at the Tavistock Clinic. She subsequently became an analyst and training analyst with the British Psychoanalytical Society.

== Theoretical contributions ==
Part of an influential group of post-Kleinian psychoanalysts working and writing in the 1970s and 80s, O'Shaughnessy's work builds on the theories of Melanie Klein and her successors such as W.R. Bion.

In a series of influential papers, O'Shaughnessy developed the concept of the defensive organization, a rigid patterns of defences and object relations that prevents progress from being made. In ‘A clinical study of a defensive organization’ (1981) she charts a patient's emergence from such a narcissistic structure, and in ‘Enclaves and Excursions’ (1992) she examines how such defensive organisations can become established in the transference-countertransference, leading to a treatment becoming 'stuck'. In this respect, O'Shaughnessy's work reflects the growing interest of Kleinian psychoanalysts in the concept of enactment. Her concepts have been developed by John Steiner in his understanding of 'psychic retreats' and 'pathological organisations'.

O'Shaughnessy explored the role of projections in the psychotic, noting how they can be "loaded with enormous hostility; they are weapons - boomerangs which destroy the foundations for intuitive knowledge of the self and object".

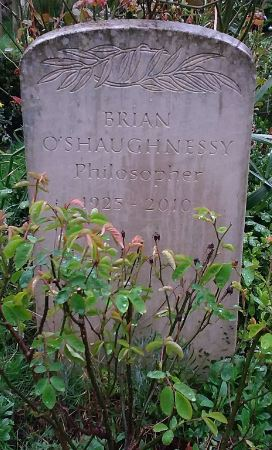
Grave of Edna O'Shaughnessy in Highgate Cemetery

In the tradition of W. R. Bion, she emphasized the importance of thinking in forming object relations, noting how failure to integrate observation and experience (due to fear of loss of omnipotence) can prevent the formation of, and working through of the Oedipal triangle.

== Personal life and death ==
O'Shaughnessy died on 25 January 2022, at the age of 97 and was buried with her husband, the philosopher Brian O'Shaughnessy on the eastern side of Highgate Cemetery, as the western side had been accidentally lit on fire.

== Criticism ==
In the essay 'The therapist who hated me', published after O'Shaughnessy's death, the academic Dr Michael Bacon revealed that he recognized himself as one of O'Shaughnessy's key cases, a boy she referred to as 'Leon'. The essay claimed that O'Shaughnessy's adherence to Kleinian theory prevented her from fully understanding him or making 'common-sense' observations during their work together. He explained that O'Shaughnessy's published papers based on the analysis of 'Leon', such as 'The Imaginary Oedipus Complex' (1989), do not accord with his memories of the treatment, and raised concerns about their positive reception amongst psychoanalysts. In particular, he states he does not believe he was a particularly troubled 11-year-old child in the first place, that he derived any benefit whatsoever from the three years he saw her, and that he increasingly found her interpretations of his comments ridiculous.

== See also ==
- Hanna Segal
- Herbert Rosenfeld
- John Steiner
