= Workplace politics =

Interpersonal interactions within the office

The term workplace politics refers to a job environment which can be compared to a political setting due to competitive social maneuvers. According to Michael Aamodt, "Organizational politics are self-serving behaviors that employees use to increase the probability of obtaining positive outcomes in organizations". Influence by individuals may serve personal interests without regard to their effect on the organization. Personal advantages may include access to tangible assets or intangible benefits such as statusand pseudo-authority that influences others. Gerald Ferris and colleagues proposed a neutral definition of organizational politics as the management of shared meanings, in which individuals actively shape how institutions are interpreted in order to bring about desired outcomes to both the individual and the group.

Workplace politics and perceptions of organizational politics are sometimes used interchangeably. However, much research distinguishes between the two concepts. Perception of organizational politics (POPs) refers to employees' subjective evaluations of how much their work environment is characterized by self-serving behavior. Because people response to the politics they perceive and not the objective political activity, research established that higher POPs is associated with lower job satisfaction and lower organizational commitment and higher job stress. This is especially true for workers who do not have a strong passion and connection to their jobs.

== History of workplace politics ==
Organizational politics work has long been the subject of social observation with early discussions of power and politics found in the work of Machiavelli. Within organizational psychology and organization behavior, the study of organizational politics is closely associated with the work of Henry Mintzberg who described workplaces as "political arenas" where people engage in a series of specific interactions and engage in political games played by individuals. This body of literature is considered a foundation reference for understanding the antecedents and consequences of internal organizational conflict. Mintzberg saw the politics as a fact of organizational life that has to be understood ad navigated. His view on politics in organizations were negative and largely framed workplace politics as illegitimate and divisive. Other theorists, like Jeffery Pfeffer and Edward Lawler viewed politics in a more neutral ways.

Research on organizational politics is usually grouped into three main categories, (1) perceptions of organizational politics, (2) political behavior, and (3) political skill. Pfeffer and Mintzberf introduced the term political skill in early 19980s, but the idea of political skills received attention through the work of Ferris and colleagues, who developed the political skill inventory in 2005, which led to an increased interest in studying the phenomenon of politics in the workplace.

More recently, scholars and researchers have expanded the view of politics to include its positive aspects, arguing that politics can be a way to restore justice, support followers, and create positive change in organizations.

== Political skill and political will ==
Research on workplace politics studied individuals differences in how people engage in politics.

Political skill refers to people's ability to understand others at work and to use that knowledge to influence them in ways that advance personal and/or organization goals. Political skill is commonly measured on its social astuteness, interpersonal influence, networking ability, and apparent sincerity.

Political will refers to people's motivation and willingness to engage in specific organizational behavior. Political skills might help employees manage the demands of their social position at work. For example, the employees whose coworkers rely on for information may experience more role overload and role ambiguity, which can lower their thriving, but political skill can reduce these negative effects.

== Positive and negative politics ==
Research on organizational politics has historically emphasized its negative effect, focusing on how workplace politics can be divisive, illegitimate, and a source of stress and dysfunction. This view of workplace politics is consistent with the deficit model of communication which focuses on identifying and fixing problems rather than on what helps people and organizations flourish. Researchers argue that this view might overlook the way political behavior can help get things done and have called for more research on the conditions under which politics produces positive outcomes

- Positive politics includes behaviors designed to influence others with the goal of helping both the organization and the individual. Examples include portraying a professional image, publicizing accomplishments, volunteering, and complimenting others.
- Negative politics involves behaviors aimed at personal gain at the expense of others and the organization. Examples include spreading rumors, talking behind someone's back, and withholding important information. Such actions can negatively impact social groupings, cooperation, information sharing, and other organizational functions.

== Perspectives on workplace politics ==
Psychologist Oliver James identifies the dark triadic personality traits (psychopathy, narcissism, and Machiavellianism) as central in understanding office politics.

John Eldred describes politics as "simply how power gets worked out on a practical, day-to-day basis". Jarie Bolander emphasizes that "Politics is the lubricant that oils your organization's internal gears".

Office politics can also take the form of influencing others not to hire strong candidates in order to prevent one's own status and authority from being diminished by a high achiever. For example, for a position that requires a high technical level on competency, a manipulator who feels threatened might persuade others to vote against the candidate because they lack marketing experience, even though the responsibilities for the position do not include marketing.

Research from critical management and organizational communication approach politics differently. Politics is not considered an individuals endeavor but a basic feature of how organizations are created, sustained, and changed. Other work has also established how workplace politics and organizational ethics are intertwined and cannot be separated because acting on ethical commitments in the workplace involves a certain level of political action

Researchers also suggested several factors that can reduce the negative effect of perceived politics. The aims of office politics or manipulation in the workplace are not always increased pay or a promotion. Often, the goal may simply be greater power or control for its own end; or to discredit a competitor. Office politics do not necessarily stem from purely selfish gains. They can be a route towards corporate benefits, which give a leg up to the company as a whole, not just an individual. "A 'manipulator' will often achieve career or personal goals by co-opting as many colleagues as possible into their plans.". Agreement between employees and employers about organizational goals can reduce negative politics. Also, personality traits and personal tendencies to engage in political skill and passion for work also play a role in reducing the harmful effects of political environments.

== Responding to organizational politics ==
Some view organizational politics is itself similar to a game, one that requires an assumption of risks just like any contact sport. "It must be played with diligence and a full understanding of the landscape, players and rules.Because politics is considered an integral part of organizational life, research suggest that employees are better served by understanding and preparing to engage with politics rather than avoiding it.

At the individual level, employees can develop the skills needed to recognize, evaluate, and act on opportunities for influence. This include social astuteness, or the ability to accurately read the informal environment and understand who holds influence. Employees can also build networks with key members of the organization. One must be careful relying on alliances made on previous circumstances; once the situation changes, alliances need to be reassessed.. Employees can also choose influence behaviors that fit the timing and the situation. For instance, political skill is found to reduce the strain caused by other workplace stressors like role conflict and physical effects. Personal resources are also important factor in determining how employees engage with workpalce politics. Employees with higher tenacity and passion for their work are usually better able to find solutions in political environments and are less likely to engage in harmful political practices.

At an organizational level, support from supervisors and from the organization can help establish a better understanding of positive political practices. Agreement between workplace members about organizational goals can also reduce the harm that politics cause to performance. Researchers recommend that organizations promote transparency and a focus on the common good rather than fragmented cultures that can create divide. Employees may choose to avoid complaining about politics for fear that it will backfire, organizations can offer clear channels for voicing concerns about favoritism and self-serving decisions, such as open discussion and open forums. Always looking out for the best interests of your company is a certain way to ensure that your motivation will remain unquestioned. L.A. Witt, from the University of New Orleans, through his findings, believes that if supervisors were to mold employee values to match their own, it would protect employees from the negative effects of organizational politics and help improve their performance.

== Workplace politics and thriving in organizations ==
Flourishing in political environment depends on understanding politics rather than avoiding it. Employees, especially those new to organizations, can benefit from utilizing politics to identify who holds influence which can help with building networks with key members of the organization.

Organizational politics can shape whether employees flourish and thrive at work. Thriving is a combination of vitality and learningwhich is thought to depend heavily on the social environment of work because energy and learning are often generate through the interactions with others. Since politics is a central part of that social environment, it has the ability to drain or support the conditions people need to flourish.

On the negative side, high perceptions of politics are associated with lower work engagement, job satisfaction, and commitment, and with higher distress, frustration, and depressed mood at work. Some research suggests these effects occur because political environment bloc employees basic psychological needs. Perceived politics can also weaken employees.

At the same time, political behavior is not always selfish and can be used for prosocial purposes and benefiting others as well as oneself. Organizational politics have the possibility and means of restoring justice, supporting followers, and creating positive change. Leaders and organizational members play a role in achieving this goal. Leaders' political skills has been linked to followers' trust in their leader, their sense of organizational support, and lower psychological strain. At the individual level, political skills has been directly linked to higher thriving and it can reduce the role ambiguity.

== See also ==
- Coworker backstabbing
- Cronyism
- Interservice rivalry
- Gaming the system
- Nepotism
- One-upmanship
- Psychological manipulation
- Workplace bullying
- Workplace democracy
