= Reparation (psychoanalysis) =

The term reparation was used by Melanie Klein (1921) to indicate a psychological process of making mental repairs to a damaged internal world. In object relations theory, it represents a key part of the movement from the paranoid-schizoid position to the depressive position — the pain of the latter helping to fuel the urge to reparation.

== Klein ==
Melanie Klein considered the ability to recognise our destructive impulses towards those we love and to make reparation for the damage we have caused them, to be an essential part of mental health. A key condition for that to take place is the recognition of one's separateness from one's parents, which makes possible the reparative attempt to restore their inner representations, however damaged they may be felt to be.

Acceptance of reality, inner and outer, forms a major part of the process and involves both abandoning fantasies of omnipotence and accepting the independent existence of one's objects of attachment.

Where the damage done to the internal world is felt by a patient to be extreme, however, the task of reparation may seem too great, which is one of the obstacles facing the analytic attempt at cure.

== Manic reparation ==
Kleinian thought distinguishes between true reparation and manic reparation, the latter being driven by guilt rather than overcoming it. Manic reparation denies the pain and concern of feeling guilty by using magical methods of repair which maintain omnipotent control of the object in question, and refuse to allow it its separate existence. Thus manic reparation has to be endlessly repeated, since success would free the object from the manic person's (contemptuous) power.

== Winnicott ==
Donald Winnicott made his own distinctive contribution to the role of reparation in the "personalising" of the individual, the move from the ruthless use of the external object to a sense of concern. Winnicott focused on the way at a certain stage of development a feeling of guilt or concern begins to appear after the wholehearted instinctual experience of a feed. But once the reparative gesture—a smile, a gift—has been successfully acknowledged by the mother, Winnicott writes: "The breast (body, mother) is now mended and the day's work is done. Tomorrow's instincts can be awaited with limited fear". The child's contribution is a way of accepting the debt owed to the mother, for their survival and their participation in the work of reparation. If, on the other hand, the reparative gesture is not accepted, the infant is left with a feeling of depression or meaninglessness.

A similar dynamic may later appear between patient and analyst, with the making of progress being offered as a means of reparation.

== Art ==
Kleinians considered that artistic creation was driven by the phantasy of repairing the loved object (mother).

Marion Milner in the Independent tradition also saw art as a way of both symbolizing and enacting inner reparation; but was criticised by Kleinians for giving too large a role to the omnipotent feelings of the artist in reparation.

== See also ==
- Donald Meltzer
- Melancholia
- Sublimation
