= Henri Rey (psychoanalyst) =

British physician and psychoanalyst

- Born: Henri Joseph Rey; 23 April 1912; Curepipe, Mauritius
- Died: 12 January 2000 (aged 87); Saint-Martin-de-Ré, France
- Occupation: Psychoanalyst

Joseph Henri Rey (23 April 1912 – 12 January 2000) was a Mauritian-British physician and psychoanalyst.

== Biography ==
Of French ancestry, Rey was born in Curepipe. After studying agricultural chemistry and working on a sugar plantation for a few years, he changed course and left for England to pursue medical studies. Rey graduated MB, BS at St Bartholomew's Hospital in 1943, and was awarded the MD in 1949. During World War II, he worked in different hospitals and in the fire service during the Blitz.

Rey joined the Maudsley Hospital in 1945. His early research largely dealt with epilepsy and endocrine functions; he was gradually drawn to psychoanalysis, and began training at the Institute of Psychoanalysis of the British Psychoanalytical Society. After qualifying as an analyst in 1958 he was appointed a consultant psychotherapist at Maudsley, and began practicing part time as a psychoanalyst. In 1977 he retired to the Île de Ré in western France, where he led an active life until his death in Saint-Martin-de-Ré in 2000.

== Work ==
Rey was particularly influenced by the work of Melanie Klein and Herbert Rosenfeld. Drawing on his work with borderline patients, Rey developed a view of the mind as conceptualised spatially. He theorized the idea of a "marsupial space" which, somewhat like the pouch of a kangaroo, could offer some excursions outside of it, while still keeping the child within the maternal space. Many disturbed patients are unable to find a safe area of this kind, which creates what Rey called a "claustro-agoraphobic dilemma": the patient can find security neither with their objects, which provokes feelings of claustrophobia and confinement, nor away from them, which provokes agoraphobic reactions and feelings of disintegration. The borderline patient finds choices between alternatives, particularly concerning issues of identity, so difficult that they choose an area on the border between these states.

== Selected publications ==
=== Articles ===
- "Liberté et processus de pensée psychotique", La Vie Médicale au Canada Français, 4 (1975), pp. 1046–1060.
- "Féminité, sexualité et espace intérieur" (1976), unpublished manuscript.
- "Schizoid Phenomena in the Borderline", in J. Le Boit and A. Capponi, Advances in the Psychotherapy of the Borderline Patient, New York: Jason Aronson, 1979, pp. 449–484.
- "The Schizoid Mode of Being and the Space-Time Continuum (Before Metaphor)", Journal of the Melanie Klein Society, 4 (1986), pp. 12–52.
- "Psycholinguistics, Object Relations, and the Therapeutic Process", Journal of the Melanie Klein Society, 4 (1986), pp. 5–35.
- "Reparation", Journal of the Melanie Klein Society, 4 (1986), pp. 5–35.
- "That Which Patients Bring to Analysis", International Journal of Psychoanalysis, 69 (1988), pp. 457–470.

=== Books ===
- Universals of Psychoanalysis in the Treatment of Psychotic and Borderline States, ed. Jeanne Magagna, London: Free Association Books, 1994.
