= Christopher Bollas =

British psychoanalyst and writer

- Born: 1943 (age 82–83); Washington D.C., U.S.
- Known for: Idiom needs
- Children: 1, Sacha Bollas
- Scientific career
- Fields: Psychoanalysis

Christopher Bollas (born 1943) is an American-born British psychoanalyst and writer. He is a leading figure in contemporary psychoanalytic theory.

== Biography ==
=== Early life and education ===
Bollas was born in the United States in Washington, DC. He grew up in Laguna Beach, California.

He graduated in history from UC Berkeley in 1967. As an undergraduate, he studied intellectual history with Carl Schorske, and psychoanalytical anthropology with Alan Dundes. From 1967 to 1969 he trained in child counselling at the East Bay Activity Center in Oakland, California, and from 1969 to 1973 he was the first graduate of the Program in Adult Psychotherapy at the University of Buffalo. At the University at Buffalo he earned a PhD in English Literature, and studied with Norman Holland, Leslie Fiedler, Murray Schwartz, Michel Foucault, René Girard and with the Heideggerian psychoanalyst Heinz Lichtenstein. While at Smith College, to earn an MSW, Bollas visited the Austen Riggs Center (where he was to become director of Education a decade later) and met Erik Erikson, who became a mentor early in his career, and was to be of singular influence for the next twenty years. Bollas qualified in psychoanalysis at the Institute of Psychoanalysis in London in 1977 and in Adult Psychotherapy from the Tavistock Clinic in 1978. Teachers and figures who helped diversify his thinking included Arnold Modell, John Bowlby, Marion Milner, André Green, Herbert Rosenfeld, Janine Chasseguet-Smirgel, Joseph J. Sandler, J.-B. Pontalis, Nina Coltart, and Paula Heimann.

=== Career ===
Bollas was a professor of English at the University of Massachusetts Amherst in the middle 1980s. Concordant with his career in literary and cultural studies, he has worked as a psychotherapist since 1967. His early clinical career focused on children with autism and schizophrenia. He was the first honorary non-medical consultant at the London Clinic of Psychoanalysis, visiting professor in psychoanalysis at the Istituto di Neuropsichiatria Infantile of the University of Rome from 1978 to 1998, Director of Education at the Austen Riggs Center from 1985 to 1988, and one of the literary editors of the works of D.W. Winnicott. He became a British citizen in 2010.

== Work ==
Bollas is most widely known for his psychoanalytical writings. Some of his ideas have had a wide dissemination; he is one of the most widely read authors in the field of psychoanalysis. His theory of "the unthought known" —that as infants we are informed by many ideas conveyed through action rather than thinking that become part of our unconscious—has been of particular significance, although other concepts "the transformational object", "violent innocence", "extractive introjection", "psychic genera and the receptive unconscious" and "human idiom" have been widely influential in the clinical field.

=== Free association ===
In the middle 1990s in Being a Character (1992) and Cracking Up (1995) Bollas turned back to Freud's early writing—especially The Interpretation of Dreams —and argued that Freud's writing implicitly assumed a theory of unconscious perception, organisation, and creativity that Bollas integrated and used in his own radical return to Freud, arguing that psychoanalysis is primarily efficacious due to entirely unconscious processes of change. In the 21st century, in Free Association, The Evocative Object World and The Infinite Question, Bollas revived Freud's marginalised theory of free association providing evidence of how and in what ways all people think associatively, revealing—as Freud argued—through the "chain of ideas", or simply how the way people move from one topic to another reveals unconscious processes of thought. In 2010, the journalist Or Ezrati, writing in the Israeli newspaper Haaretz, remarked: "Some people see Christopher Bollas as one of the two most important living theoreticians in the world of psychoanalysis".

=== Idiom needs ===
In Being a Character, Bollas also argued that everybody had their own idiom for life—a blend between the psychic organisation which from birth forms the self's core, and the implied logic of the familial way of relating into which we are then raised.

As adults, Bollas considered we spend our time looking for objects of interest—human or material—which can serve to enhance our particular idioms or styles of life—perpetually "meeting idiom needs by securing evocatively nourishing objects". Being willing to risk exposure to such transformational objects was for Bollas an essential part of a healthy life: the readiness to be metamorphosed by one's interaction with the object world.

The contrast was a refusal of development and self-invention, of open-endedness: the state of psychic stagnation. Bollas saw in what he called the anti-narcissist a willed refusal to use objects for the development of his/her own idiom, and a consequent foreclosure of the true self. The result can lead to what Adam Phillips called "the core catastrophe in many of Bollas's powerful clinical vignettes ... being trapped in someone else's (usually the parents') dream or view of the world".

Bollas was, however, well aware of the converse danger of expecting too much from the role of the transformational object, especially as found within the transference. This form of overinvestment is closely related to what later psychoanalytic authors have termed the Phantastic Object, in which the object is idealized and unconsciously treated as capable of total or magical transformation.

== In popular culture ==
Aside from his clinical writings, Bollas is also a cultural critic and his writings have earned the interests of people outside the world of psychoanalysis. He has also written three comic novels - Dark at the End of the Tunnel, I Have Heard the Mermaids Singing and Mayhem - and five plays.

An American television sitcom, Cracking Up, derived its title from Bollas' book of the same title and included a main character, "Dr Bollas", played by Henry Gibson. Bollas is also among the psychoanalysts mentioned in the first series of HBO's In Treatment.

== Bibliography ==
=== Monographs ===
- The Shadow of the Object (1987, Free Association Books: 1987 Columbia University Press) ISBN 978-0231066273
- Forces of Destiny (1989, Free Association Books) ISBN 978-1138692008
- Being a Character (1992, Routledge) ISBN 978-0415088152
- Cracking Up (1995, Routledge) ISBN 978-0809085330
- The New Informants (with David Sundelson, 1996, Jason Aronson) ISBN 978-1568215952
- The Mystery of Things (1999, Routledge) ISBN 978-0415212311
- Hysteria (1999, Routledge) ISBN 978-0415220330
- Free Association (2002, Ikon Books) ISBN 978-1840463521
- The Freudian Moment (2007, Karnac Books) ISBN 978-1780491301
- The Evocative Object World (2009, Routledge) ISBN 978-0415473941
- The Infinite Question (2009, Routledge) ISBN 978-0415473927
- The Christopher Bollas Reader (2011, Routledge) ISBN 978-0415664615
- China on the Mind (2013, Routledge) ISBN 978-0415669764
- Catch Them Before They Fall: Psychoanalysis of Breakdown (2013, Routledge) ISBN 978-0415637206
- When the Sun Bursts: The Enigma of Schizophrenia (2015, Yale University Press) ISBN 978-0300223651
- Meaning and Melancholia (2018, Routledge) ISBN 978-1138497535
- Three Characters: Narcissist, Borderline, Manic Depressive (2021, Karnac Books) ISBN 978-1912691814
- Conversations (2023, Karnac Books) ISBN 9781800132474
- Essential Aloneness: Rome Lectures on DW Winnicott (2023, Oxford University Press) ISBN 978-0197683880
- Streams of Consciousness (September 2024, Karnac Books)
  - Volume I: Notebooks 1971-1990 ISBN 9781800132580
  - Volume II: Notebooks 1991-2024 ISBN 9781800132610
- Pitching to the Dream Team (January 2026, Bloomsbury Academic) ISBN 9798216202035
- Axioms of Mind and Lived Experience: On Character and the Assumed (August 2026, Karnac Books) ISBN 9781800134799

=== Fiction and plays ===
- Dark at the End of the Tunnel (2004 Free Association Books) ISBN 978-1853437984
- I Have Heard the Mermaids Singing (2005 Free Association Books) ISBN 978-1853437595
- Theraplay and Other Plays (2005 Free Association Books) ISBN 978-1853439681
- Mayhem (2005, Free Associations Books) ISBN 978-1853439285
