= David A. Berkowitz =

American psychiatrist, psychoanalyst and author

David A. Berkowitz, M.D. (died 2010) is an American psychiatrist, psychoanalyst, and author known for his application of object relations theory to family, couple, and adolescent psychotherapy. He served as an assistant professor of psychiatry at Tufts University School of Medicine and directed family therapy training at New England Medical Center Hospital.

== Career ==
Berkowitz held the position of assistant professor of psychiatry at Tufts University School of Medicine and served as Director of Family Therapy Training for Adult Psychiatry at New England Medical Center Hospital.

His clinical and academic work focuses on integrating psychoanalytic principles particularly from the object relations tradition into systemic psychotherapy. His writing emphasizes the influence of internalized early relationships on family and couple dynamics.

In his 1977 article, On the Reclaiming of Denied Affects in Family Therapy, he explored how the suppression and therapeutic recovery of repressed emotions affect family systems.

In 1979, Berkowitz examined adolescent individuation in his article The disturbed adolescent and his family: problems of separation-individuation in the family system, offering a psychodynamic model for understanding developmental challenges in family contexts.

He died on October 28, 2010, at the age of 66.

== Publications ==
Berkowitz is a contributing author to the 1989 edited volume Foundations of Object Relations Family Therapy, a key text in object relations–based family treatment. He also co-authored the chapter Concurrent Family Treatment of Narcissistic Disorders in Adolescence in the same volume.

In 1999, he published Reversing the Negative Cycle: Interpreting the Mutual Influence of Adaptive Self-Protective Measures in the Couple in The Psychoanalytic Quarterly, where he analyzed how early object-relational dynamics influence intimate relationships.

== Selected works ==
- On the Reclaiming of Denied Affects in Family Therapy. The American Journal of Family Therapy (1977), 5(2), 19–27.
- The disturbed adolescent and his family: problems of separation-individuation in the family system (1979), Journal of Adolescence, 2(1), 71–82.
- The Influence of Family Experience on Borderline Personality Development (1989), Foundations of Object Relations Family Therapy.
- Concurrent Family Treatment of Narcissistic Disorders in Adolescence (1989). In J.S. Scharff (Ed.), Foundations of Object Relations Family Therapy.
- Reversing the Negative Cycle: Interpreting the Mutual Influence of Adaptive Self-Protective Measures in the Couple (1999). Psychoanalytic Quarterly, 68(4), 559–583.

== See also ==
- Family therapy
- Couple therapy
- Psychoanalysis
