= Francis Pasche =

French psychoanalyst

Francis Pasche (French: [fʁɑ̃sis paʃ]; 7 May 1910 – 12 September 1996) was a French psychoanalyst. He was born in Paris and died in Suresnes.
