= Thomas Ogden =

American psychiatrist, psychoanalyst and novelist

Thomas H. Ogden
- Born: December 4, 1946 (age 79)
- Known for: Revision of clinical technique
- Scientific career
- Fields: Psychoanalysis

Thomas Ogden (born December 4, 1946) is an American psychoanalyst and writer, of both psychoanalytic and fiction books, who lives and works in San Francisco, California.

== Biography ==
Ogden received a BA from Amherst College, MA, and an MD from Yale, where he also completed a psychiatric residency. He served for a year as an Associate Psychiatrist at the Tavistock Clinic in London, and did his psychoanalytic training at the San Francisco Psychoanalytic Institute, where he has remained on the faculty. For more than 25 years he has served as Director of the Center for the Advanced Study of the Psychoses. He has also been a member of the North American Editorial Board for the International Journal of Psychoanalysis, the Psychoanalytic Quarterly, and Psychoanalytic Dialogues.

Ogden is a supervising and personal analyst at the Psychoanalytic Institute of Northern California.

== Work ==
Ogden does not consider himself an advocate or an opponent of any particular school of psychoanalysis. Neither does he think of himself as a "lone voice", "because that suggests that I think of myself as a renegade. I would much prefer to describe myself as an independent thinker." Central influences include the British school (Bion, Klein, Winnicott) and literary figures, such as Borges, Kafka, Frost, and Coetzee.

Thomas Ogden's psychoanalytic contributions include:

- The concept of the analytic third.
- His use of reverie.
- A revised conception of aspects of analytic technique - including the fundamental rule, the use of the couch, and dream analysis.
- The concept of an autistic-contiguous position in mental experience.
- Revised understandings of the male and female Oedipus complex.
- His unique perspective on the use of language in psychoanalysis.
- His approach to the psychoanalysis of schizophrenic patients.
- The relationship between psychoanalysis and literature.
- Creative readings of seminal works by major 20th Century psychoanalytic writers.
- The concepts of epistemeological and ontological psychoanalysis.
- Rethinking the concept of the unconscious.

== Reception ==
Ogden has been referred to as "a poet's psychoanalyst — someone who listens to his patients on the level of voice, metaphor."

Gregorio Kohon, of the British Psychoanalytical Society, remarks that "Ogden belongs to that rare group of psychoanalysts who are also good writers. ...he re-creates the vitality of his own dream-life through creative readings of poetry and the unspoken, of fiction and mourning, of analytic sensibility and the aliveness of language. Ogden transforms the relationship between reader and writer into a fruitful and intimate dialogue. One's own reveries, ruminations, daydreams, memories, and - of course - dreams, become part of the conversation with him."

Ogden's work has been translated into more than twenty-five languages, including English, French, German, Italian, Japanese, Chinese, Portuguese, Turkish and Hebrew.

== Awards ==
Ogden's honors include:

- 2004 International Journal of Psychoanalysis Award for the Most Important Paper of the year;
- 2010 Haskell Norman Prize, an international award for Outstanding Achievement in Psychoanalysis;
- 2012 Sigourney Award;
- 2014 Hans Loewald Award for Distinguished Contribution to Psychoanalytic Education.

== Bibliography ==
=== Psychoanalytic writings ===
- Ogden, Thomas (2025): What Alive Means: Psychoanalytic Explorations. London and New York: Routledge.
- Ogden, Thomas (2021): Coming to Life in the Consulting Room: Towards a New Analytic Sensibility. London and New York: Routledge.
- Ogden, Thomas (2016): Reclaiming Unlived Life: Experiences in Psychoanalysis. London and New York: Routledge.
- Ogden, Thomas and Benjamin Ogden (2013): The Analyst's Ear and the Critic's Eye: Rethinking Psychoanalysis and Literature. London and New York: Routledge.
- Ogden, Thomas (2012): Creative Readings: Essays on Seminal Analytic Works. London and New York: Routledge.
- Ogden, Thomas (2009): Rediscovering Psychoanalysis: Thinking and Dreaming, Learning and Forgetting. London and New York: Routledge.
- Ogden, Thomas (2005): This Art of Psychoanalysis: Dreaming Undreamt Dreams and Interrupted Cries. London and New York: Roudlege.
- Ogden, Thomas (2001): Conversations at the Frontier of Dreaming. London: Karnac Books.
- Ogden, Thomas (1997): Reverie and Interpretation: Sensing Something Human. London: Karnac Books.
- Ogden, Thomas (1994): Subjects of Analysis. New York: Jason Aronson.
- Ogden, Thomas (1989): The Primitive Edge of Experience. London: Karnac Books.
- Ogden, Thomas (1986): The Matrix of the Mind: Object Relations and the Psychoanalytic Dialogue. London: Karnac Books.
- Ogden, Thomas (1982): Projective Identification and Psychotherapeutic Technique. London: Karnac Books.

=== Novels ===
- Ogden, Thomas (2021): This Will Do... A Novel. Sphinx Books.
- Ogden, Thomas (2016): The Hands of Gravity and Chance. A Novel. Sphinx Books.
- Ogden, Thomas (2014): The Parts Left Out. A Novel. Sphinx Books.
