= Naturalization of value systems =

The naturalization of value systems in the human sciences is the process by which other frameworks were sought to replace spiritual, "other-worldly", religious explanations of nature, life and humanity with respect to fundamental values.
