= Antonino Ferro =

Italian psychoanalyst

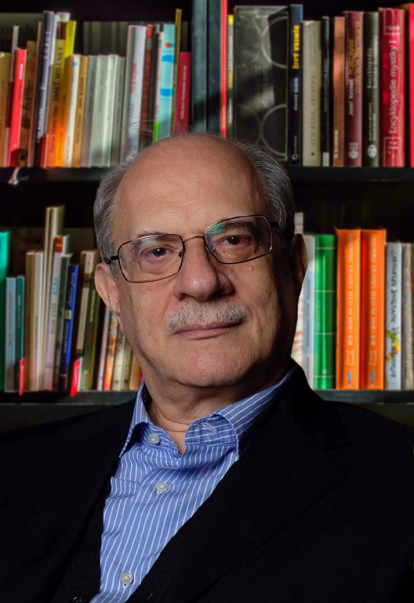
- Born: 2 March 1947 (age 79); Italy
- Known for: Anatalytic Field Theory (Post-Bionian Field Theory, BFT)
- Scientific career
- Fields: Psychoanalysis
- Institutions: Pavia

Antonino Ferro (Italian: [antoˈniːno ˈfɛrro]; born 2 March 1947) is an Italian psychoanalyst, who specializes in the work with children and adult patients with severe disorders. He is strongly influenced by the British psychoanalyst W.R. Bion, and together with Giuseppe Civitarese (also a frequent collaborator) has been instrumental in the development of Anatalytic Field Theory (Post-Bionian Field Theory, BFT).

== Biography ==
Antonino Ferro works from Pavia near Milan, and is a member of the Italian Psychoanalytic Society, of which he was the president from 2013 to 2017; he is also a member of the International Psychoanalytic Association.

== Work ==
=== Overview ===
Ferro, alongside Giuseppe Civitarese, is primarily known for his development of the concept of the analytic field, for which he borrowed from the work of W.R. Bion and the Barangers. The analytic field is a response to the notion of the analytic dyad. Ferro further develops this concept by arguing that there aren't merely two persons involved in analysis. Rather, they are part of a larger, co-constructed field. He writes:

[...] field theory has a strong technical specificity of its own, in that it breaks for the first time with the idea of making the here and-now explicit in the session and of consequent transference interpretation. As a result, the relational aspect in effect becomes a stream flowing through the field; this river then widens out into a vast lake in which there is time for characters to emerge, to sink into the depths, to return to the background or to take the stage again.

Ferro, trained as a Kleinian, would eventually move away from its focus on the penetrating analysis of phantasy-life, since he felt it would create a persecutory environment for the analysand. Building on Bion's concept of reverie, he emphasized the analyst mind's receptivity for dreams. Ferro thus establishes an intersubjective positioning of the analyst and the analysand who together explore the various dreams that permeate the consulting room.

=== The field ===
The field is a concept taken from the work of the Barangers, two Argentinian psychoanalysts of French descent. The Barangers argued that the field "is a dynamic bi-personal configuration, including spatial, temporal and functional elements, resulting in an unconscious 'bi-personal phantasy'."

=== Affective hologram ===
Ferro conceives of the clinical encounter as a space for exploring narratives, dreams, and stories. As part of this explorative process he proposes something he refers to as affective hologram. In each story of the analysand there's various characters that appears as such a hologram, that is to say, an emotional constellation. Levine suggests that the Field is thus home to "giant weather map, with each statement implying the possible beginning formation of a new weather disturbance."

=== Saturated and unsaturated Interpretations ===
Ferro draws a distinction between two types of interpretation: saturated and unsaturated ones, with each of them impacting the transference differently. If an interpretation is to saturated, then it establishes to definite a hold on the transference and narrows down the potential meanings.

== Reception ==
Ferro has been hailed by Howard Levine as one of Bion's "most fertile, productive and creative" descendants, "the embodiment of Bion's concept [of an analyst]". Levine goes on to praise Ferro's unique contributions to contemporary psychoanalysis, a vision Levine describes as "catalytic, transformational". The jury of the Sigourney Award referred to him further as "a psychoanalytic leader, making major contributions to literature, lecturing, and teaching throughout the world and building bridges between psychoanalysis and the scientific and university communities."

== Awards ==
- 2007: Sigourney Award

== Bibliography ==
=== Books ===
- 1992: La tecnica nella psicoanalisi infantile: il bambino e l'analista: dalla relazione al campo emotivo
  - 1999: The Bi-Personal Field. Experiences in Child Analysis, Routledge
- 1996: Nella stanza d'analisi: emozioni, racconti, trasformazioni
  - 2002: In the Analyst's Consulting Room
- 1999: La psicoanalisi come letteratura e terapia
  - 2006: Psychoanalysis as Literature and Therapy
- 2000: Teoria e tecnica nella supervisione psicoanalitica: seminari clinici di San Paolo
  - 2013: Supervision in Psychoanalysis: The Sao Paulo Seminars
- 2000: Prima altrove chi
  - 2015: Reveries: An Unfettered Mind
- 2002: Fattori di malattia, fattori di guarigione : genesi della sofferenza e cura psicoanalitica
  - 2005: Seeds of Illness, Seeds of Recovery: The Genesis of Suffering and the Role of Psychoanalysis
- 2003: Il lavoro clinico: nuovi seminari di San Paolo e Riberão Preto
- 2007: Evitare le emozioni, vivere le emozioni
  - 2011: Avoiding Emotions, Living Emotions, Routledge
- 2008: Tecnica e creatività: il lavoro analitico
  - 2009: Mind Works: Technique and Creativity in Psychoanalysis
- 2010: Tormenti di anime: passioni, sintomi, sogni
  - 2015: Torments of the Soul: Passions, Symptoms, Dreams
- 2011: Psicoanalisi in giallo: l'analista come detective [Psychoanalysis in yellow: the analyst as detective] (with Giuseppe Civitarese, Maurizio Collovà, Giovanni Foresti, Fulvio Mazzacane, Elena Molinari, Pierluigi Politi)
- 2013: Psicoanalisi oggi: teoria e tecnica
  - 2019: Psychoanalytic Practice Today: A Post-Bionian Introduction to Psychopathology, Affect and Emotions
- 2014: Le viscere della mente: sillabario emotivo e narrazioni
  - 2019: Psychoanalysis and Dreams: Bion, the Field and the Viscera of the Mind
- 2015: Il campo analitico e le sue trasformazioni (with Giuseppe Civitarese)
  - 2015: The Analytic Field and its Transformations
- 2017: Pensieri di uno psicoanalista irriverente: guida per analisti e pazienti curiosi (with Luca Nicoli)
  - 2017: The New Analyst's Guide to the Galaxy: Questions about Contemporary Psychoanalysis
- 2018: Un invito alla psicoanalisi (with Giuseppe Civitarese)
  - 2020: A Short Introduction to Psychoanalysis, Routledge
- 2020: Vitalità e gioco in psicoanalisi (with Giuseppe Civitarese)
  - 2022: Playing and Vitality in Psychoanalysis, Routledge

=== Edited volumes ===
- 2007: Sognare l'analisi: sviluppi clinici del pensiero di Wilfred R. Bion (with others)
- 2011: Il campo analitico: un concetto clinico (with Roberto Basile)

=== Selected articles ===
- 2003: Marcella: the transition from explosive sensoriality to the ability to think. In: Psychoanalytic Quarterly LXXII, 183-200
