= Gabriel Segal (philosopher) =

Academic philosopher

Professor Gabriel Segal is an academic philosopher, cognitive scientist and an author.

== Background and education ==
Gabriel Mark Aurel Segal was born in the United Kingdom in 1959, and is the son of psychoanalyst Hanna Segal and brother of mathematician Dan Segal.

Segal was educated at University College London, where he received a BA in Philosophy with First Class Honours in 1981. Later he studied for his B. Phil. at the University of Oxford graduating in 1983 with an overall distinction, and winning the John Locke Prize in Mental Philosophy.

Finally, Segal received his PhD in Philosophy from MIT in 1987, supervised by Ned Block and Noam Chomsky.

== Academic career ==
Segal's first teaching appointment was at the University of Wisconsin-Madison, after which he accepted a lectureship at King's in 1989.

Segal has been lecturer, reader and professor of philosophy King's College London. He served as Head of Department and has been named Professor Emeritus.

== Publications ==
Segal has published extensively on cognitive science, philosophy of mind and psychology, and philosophy of language and linguistics. His work has appeared in academic journals, reviews, books and as individual papers

He co-authored Knowledge of Meaning: An Introduction to Semantic Theory with Richard Larson in 1995 (ISBN 978-0262621007). Segal also authored A Slim Book about Narrow Content, which was published in 2000 (ISBN 978-0262692304) and Twelve Steps To Psychological Good Health and Serenity – A Guide, published in 2013 (ISBN 978-1781488461) with a second edition released in 2017 (ISBN 978-1786238795). In the latter, Segal makes AA's traditional twelve-step program accessible to non-addicts as a psycho-behavioural tool for stress management and peace of mind.

In September 2016, Segal co-edited Addiction and Choice: Rethinking the Relationship (ISBN 978-0198727224) with Nick Heather. The book was listed as "Highly Commended" in the category of Public Health at the BMA Book Awards 2017. Published by Oxford University Press, the 25-chapter book provides a multidisciplinary perspective on the relationship between addiction and choice from various fields, including philosophy, neuroscience, psychiatry, psychology and the law. Segal's chapters include "20: How an Addict's Power of Choice is Lost and can be Regained" in which he offers a neuro-scientific defence of Twelve-step programs and "24: Ambiguous terms and false dichotomies" in which he defends the disease model of addiction.

Segal appears as a regular panellist on the internet project AskPhilosophers, a question-and-answer website about philosophical issues. In one instance, a reader posed the question to the project: "Are there arguments against gay marriage that are not religious, bigoted or both?" Segal replied: "There are no good arguments meeting that description".
