= Geoff Smith (mathematician) =

British mathematician

Geoff Smith MBE
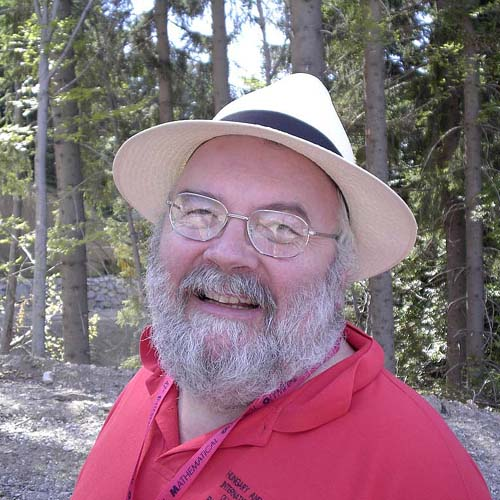
- Geoff Smith in 2006
- Born: Geoffrey Charles Smith; 1953 (age 72–73)
- Education: Trinity School; Keble College, Oxford; University of Warwick; University of Manchester (PhD)
- Known for: Group Theory
- Scientific career
- Fields: Group Theory
- Workplaces: University of Bath

Geoffrey Charles Smith (born 1953) is a British mathematician. He is Honorary Reader in Mathematics at the University of Bath (where he worked in group theory) and currently professor in residence at Wells Cathedral School.

He was educated at Trinity School in Croydon, and attended Keble College, Oxford, the University of Warwick, and the University of Manchester, where he gained a PhD degree in group theory in 1983.

Smith was the leader of the United Kingdom team at the International Mathematical Olympiad between 2002 and 2010, a longer continuous period than any other person. He returned to the position as leader of the UK IMO team from 2013 and has taken that role 15 times in total.

Smith oversaw a quantitative increase in training: annual events in Bath (moving to The Queen's College, Oxford, from 2009), at Oundle School, in Hungary, at Trinity College, Cambridge, and immediately prior to the IMO itself. He also thrice won the IMO Golden Microphone, awarded to the national team leader who makes the most speeches to the IMO Jury. In 2010, he was elected to the IMO Advisory Board for a four-year period. Smith was elected as the chair of the International Mathematical Olympiad for the term of 2014-2018 and was re-elected in 2018. He ceased to be a member of the IMO Board in 2025 but continues to chair its Syllabus Review Committee.

Smith also prepared UK teams for the Romanian Masters in Mathematics tournament (which they won in 2008), and for participation as guests at the annual Balkan Mathematical Olympiad. He conceived the European Girls' Maths Olympiad, designed its rules, and helped to launch its inaugural edition in Cambridge in 2012.

Since 2024, he has served on the Advisory Board of the Artificial Intelligence Mathematics Olympiad. He was appointed Chair of Trustees of the UK Maths Trust in 2023 and continues to serve in that capacity. He cooperates with Aseeder and supervises the academic programme of the annual British Mathematical Olympiad Camp in China.

As well as group theory, he is also interested in Euclidean geometry. He often collaborated with the late Christopher Bradley and the late David Monk, and has published several papers on Forum Geometricorum, the online geometry journal.

Smith is the author of two Springer Texts and three books published by the UK Maths Trust to support Olympiad Mathematics.

In June 2011, Smith was appointed an MBE for services to education following his contributions toward organising Royal Institution Maths Masterclasses.

Preceded by Imre Leader	UK International Mathematical Olympiad Team Leader; 2002–2010	Succeeded by James Cranch
Preceded by James Cranch	UK International Mathematical Olympiad Team Leader; 2013	Most recent
