= Hanna Segal =

British psychologist (1918–2011)

- Born: 20 August 1918; Łódź, Poland
- Died: 5 July 2011 (aged 92); London, United Kingdom
- Resting place: England
- Known for: Theoretical contributions to psychoanalysis, especially on Melanie Klein, Aesthetics and contemporary events
- Scientific career
- Fields: Medicine, Psychiatry, Psychoanalysis
- Workplaces: British Psychoanalytical Society, University College London

Hanna Segal (born Hanna Poznańska; 20 August 1918 – 5 July 2011) was a British psychoanalyst of Polish descent and a follower of Melanie Klein. She was president of the British Psychoanalytical Society, vice-president of the International Psychoanalytical Association, and was appointed to the Freud Memorial Chair at University College, London (UCL) in 1987. The American psychoanalyst James Grotstein considered that "received wisdom suggests that she is the doyen of "classical" Kleinian thinking and technique." The BBC broadcaster Sue Lawley introduced her as "one of the most distinguished psychological theorists of our time,"

== Early life and education ==
Hanna Segal was born into a middle class Jewish family in Łódź, Poland. After the family moved to Warsaw, she began her medical studies at Warsaw University.

Segal was politically involved with the Polish Socialist Party. When Hitler invaded Poland on 1 September 1939, she was fortuitously on holiday in France from where she had to flee arriving in Great Britain (via Switzerland). She completed her medical studies in the wartime Polish medical department at Edinburgh University. She next undertook psychoanalytic training in London, and an analysis first with David Matthews, a pupil of Melanie Klein, and later with Klein herself whose close follower she became and whose work she went on to expound with clarity. It is said that without Segal's introductory works, Klein would not have become so famous, and would certainly have been far less accessible.

== Work ==
=== Symbolism and art ===
Segal emphasised the difference between the symbol as representative and the earlier stage of symbol as equivalent, stating that "only when separation and separateness are accepted does the symbol become the representative of the object rather than being equated with the object." The earlier stage of symbolic equation was by contrast typical of concrete psychotic thinking.

Building on and extending her analysis of symbolism, Segal made further contributions to Kleinian aesthetics. Segal stresses that "one of the most important tasks of the artist is to create a world of his own", something which requires "an acute reality sense in two ways: first, towards his own inner reality...and secondly...of the reality of his medium." She also emphasised the role of the ugly in artistic creation, as a reflection of the fragmenting of good objects into persecutory ones, seeing the roots of artistic creation in the desire to restore a fragmented inner world.

=== War ===
Segal explored the relationship of war to the contrast between the paranoid and depressive positions in Kleinian thought, highlighting the usefulness of the role of an identified enemy in warding off the subjective pain of depression. Segal continued her lengthy examination of the relationship between psychological factors and war in her work on the symbolic significance of the events of September 11.

== Criticism ==
In the main, Segal was content to work within the framework Klein had provided. In terms of the distinction sometimes drawn between "extenders", "modifiers", and "heretics" in psychoanalytic theory, she clearly fell into the first category with respect to Klein. Her long-term explication of the richness of Klein's thought nevertheless meant that Segal's work stands close to the core of post-Kleinian research and development.

Segal has also been criticised for her belief that lesbian love is a denial of reality, a narcissistic phantasy that is dominated by projective identification and envy, and that lesbian parenthood is an attack on heterosexual parents.

== Personal life ==
Segal married mathematician Paul Segal in 1946. He died in 1996. There were three sons of the marriage: Michael a civil servant, mathematician Dan, and philosopher Gabriel.

== Partial bibliography ==
Books:

- Introduction to the work of Melanie Klein (London 1964);
- Klein (London: Fontana Modern Masters, 1979);
- Melanie Klein (Glasgow 1979);
- Clinical Psychoanalysis (Paris 2004);
- Dream, Phantasy and Art (Paris 1993);
- Delirium and Creativity (Paris 1986) (with Annik Comby).

Papers:

- Segal, Hanna (1952). A Psychoanalytical Approach to Aesthetics. International Journal of Psychoanalysis. p. 33.
- Segal, Hanna (1957). Notes on Symbol Formation. International Journal of Psychoanalysis. p. 38, 391–405.

== See also ==
- Edna O'Shaughnessy
- Object relations theory
