= John Steiner (psychoanalyst) =

Psychoanalyst and author

John Steiner (born 1934) is a British psychoanalyst, author and trainer at the British Psychoanalytical Society. Steiner, a "prolific London post-Kleinian", is best known for his conceptions of the "pathological organisation" or the "psychic retreat"...between the paranoid-schizoid and the depressive positions'. His book, Psychic Retreats, describes a treatment methodology for patients with complex defence mechanisms that are difficult to treat with conventional psychoanalysis.

== Mental organization ==
=== The paranoid-schizoid position ===
John Steiner separates this into two poles:

1. Pathological fragmentation is regarded as the most archaic. This is where splitting has failed to contain anxiety, and the ego breaks up in self-defense. The defensive operation of "fragmentation" brings with it a deathly sense of anguish, a sense of chaos that can result in impressive and spectacular clinical scenarios.
2. Normal splitting, which is primarily seen as a progressive process. The distinction between good and bad already implies a degree of solid integration that allows a good relationship with a good object. This distinction is based on a divide, protecting it from destructive impulses directed towards the bad object. There is alternation between idealization / persecution, and in favorable situations, access to ambivalence, and therefore to the depressive position.

Steiner spoke in terms of 'fluctuations...between the two positions, paranoid-schizoid and depressive, involving 'periods of integration leading to depressive position functioning or disintegration and fragmentation resulting in a paranoid-schizoid state'. He emphasised the appearance of 'a sense of wholeness both in the self and in object relations as the depressive position is approached'.

=== The depressive position ===
Steiner divides the depressive position into two poles: 'a phase of denial of the loss of the object and a phase of experience of the loss of the object '.

1. The pole of the fear of the loss of the object — 'stuck in the first phase of the depressive position, in which the fear of loss of the object dominated his defensive organization so that mourning could not be reached there'.

2. Experience of the loss of the object, with all that that implies of renunciation.

== Psychic retreat ==
In all these subpositions, there is the possibility of a psychic withdrawal which offers a temporary escape — but at the cost of mental impairment. Faithful to Melanie Klein, Steiner considers that throughout life there is an oscillation between the positions and their subdivisions. Everything hinges upon the "position" of withdrawal that may be attached to each of them. Unlike Donald Winnicott, Steiner suggests that we should not idealize transitional areas, on the grounds that they may be confused with a psychological withdrawal that is not creative. Withdrawal is to be understood simultaneously as an expression of destructiveness and a defense against it, serving a quasi-adaptivity which allows a quiet and temporarily protected space but at the price of impaired contact with reality: 'withdrawal to a refuge where the patient was relatively free from anxiety but where development was minimal'.

Such withdrawal can also be seen as a schizoid regression in Fairbairn's sense, the borderline patient tending to shun contact with both himself and his objects. Steiner here refers to the little-known theories of Henri Rey about 'the "marsupial space"' of earliest life — a psychological space on analogy to the kangaroo's pouch, which continues until the individual has found a personal space separate from the breast area: 'the borderline patient often feels he has been prematurely and cruelly pushed out of this maternal space', producing the '"claustro-agoraphobic" dilemma...trapped in a psychic retreat'.

'In attempting to reach analysands in the psychic retreat, Steiner put forth the idea of a distinction between "patient-centred" and "analyst-centred" interpretations', the latter being focused around 'what he believes that the analysand believes that the analyst believes'.

== Personal life ==
Steiner married Deborah Pickering in 1963: their son Michael was born in 1965, daughter Kate in 1966, and daughter Susie in 1971.

== Bibliography ==
=== Edited volumes ===
- The Oedipus complex today : clinical implications, ed. with Ronald Britton; Michael Feldman; Edna O'Shaughnessy (1989)
- Melanie Klein's lectures on technique. Their relevance for contemporary psychoanalysis, ed. with critical review by John Steiner (2017)

=== Monographs ===
- Psychic Retreats : Pathological Organizations in Psychotic, Neurotic and Borderline Patients (1993)
- Seeing and being seen: emerging from a psychic retreat (2007)
- Illusion, Disillusion, and Irony in Psychoanalysis (2020)

== See also ==
- Edna O'Shaughnessy
