= Free Association Books =

British publishing house

- Founded: 1980s
- Founder: Bob Young and colleagues
- Country of origin: United Kingdom
- Headquarters location: London
- Distribution: NBN International (Europe); International Specialized Book Services (North America)
- Publication types: books
- Official website: www.freeassociationpublishing.com

Free Association Books is a project started in London in the 1980s. Bob Young and colleagues began a search using psychoanalysis to understand the problems of liberation. Other people became involved in the movement such as Andrew Samuels and Bob Hinshelwood and it grew quickly into a publishing house which produced books written by young psychoanalysts.

Its house journal was Free Associations, which commenced publication in 1984, initially as "Radical Science 15". Its annual conference, "Psychoanalysis and the Public Sphere" ran in conjunction with the University of East London.

Authors who have published with them include Mary Barnes, Martin Bernal, Christopher Bollas, Janine Chasseguet-Smirgel (for English translations), Michael Fordham, André Green, Donna Haraway, Oliver James, Ludmilla Jordanova, Joel Kovel, Michel Odent, Paul Roazen, Adam Jukes and Eugene Victor Wolfenstein

Free Association Books is now owned by Free Publishing Ltd and continues to publish a wide range of texts.
