= Herbert Rosenfeld =

German-British psychoanalyst

- Born: Herbert Alexander Rosenfeld; 2 July 1910; Nuremberg, Kingdom of Bavaria, German Empire
- Died: 29 November 1986 (aged 76); London, England
- Known for: Clinical work with psychotic and borderline patients
- Scientific career
- Fields: Psychoanalysis

Herbert Alexander Rosenfeld (German: [ˈʁoːzn̩fɛlt]; 2 July 1910 – 29 November 1986) was a German-British psychoanalyst.

Rosenfeld made seminal contributions to Kleinian thinking on psychotic and other very ill patients; while his emphasis on the role of the analyst in contributing to potential impasses in the analytic encounter has had a wide impact on analysts both in Britain and internationally. Among his most significant contributions were his groundbreaking exploration of projective identification; the development of the concept of "confusion"; and the foundation of a theory of destructive narcissism, since taken up and developed by André Green and Otto Kernberg.

== Life ==
Rosenfeld was born in Nuremberg in 1910, into a Jewish family. He received his medical diploma in Munich in 1934, and emigrated to Britain one year later due to the Nuremberg Laws prohibiting him from working with non-Jewish patients. He retook his medical degree, and went on to undergo a training analysis with Melanie Klein. He eventually became an analyst himself in 1945 and continued to work within the Kleinian movement. He died in London on 29 November 1986.

== Work ==
=== On confusion ===
Rosenfeld saw confusion as a halfway house between splitting and reintegration, either as a progressive step towards the latter, or as a regression from it. In its negative aspect, according to Hanna Segal, "a most powerful element in confusion is envy […] Narcissistic organisation protects us from that confusion".

=== Destructive narcissism ===
Rosenfeld played a leading part in the work of Kleinians on the destructive aspects of narcissism. For Rosenfeld, "destructive narcissism […] is directed against the libidinal ties or bonds of the self to the object".

The concept of what Rosenfeld termed "narcissistic omnipotent object relations" – a state of mind dominated by an internal object merging ego and ego ideal in a form of mad omnipotence – was later to feed into Kernberg's notion of the pathologically grandiose self.

=== Analytical impasse ===
Rosenfeld's final work, Impasse and Interpretation (1987), focused on the possibility of overcoming critical moments of impasse with difficult patients. Rosenfeld was increasingly convinced that such potentially destructive impasses were predicated on the existence of blind spots in the analyst, thus pointing the way for the later developments of intersubjective psychoanalysis.

While for some analysts, the negative therapeutic reaction is an insurmountable block, Rosenfeld attempts to show that these "dead ends" are moments that can and should be overcome. Using the concept of envy to shed light on analytic impasse, Rosenfeld maintained that while patients may in some ways prefer to resist change rather than allow the analyst to help them, if handled innovatively, such stalemates may allow patients to bring back to life for their analyst the impasses they subjectively lived at key moments in their development.

== Bibliography ==
- Über die sogenannten "gehäuften Absencen" im Kindesalter, medical dissertation (Munich, 1935)
- Psychotic States: A Psycho-Analytical Approach (New York: International Universities Press, 1965)
- Impasse and Interpretation: Therapeutic and Anti-Therapeutic Factors in the Psychoanalytic Treatment of Psychotic, Borderline, and Neurotic Patients (London: Tavistock Publications, 1987)
- Herbert Rosenfeld at Work: The Italian Seminars (New York: Karnac Books, 2001)
