= Melanie Klein =

Austrian-British psychoanalyst (1882–1960)

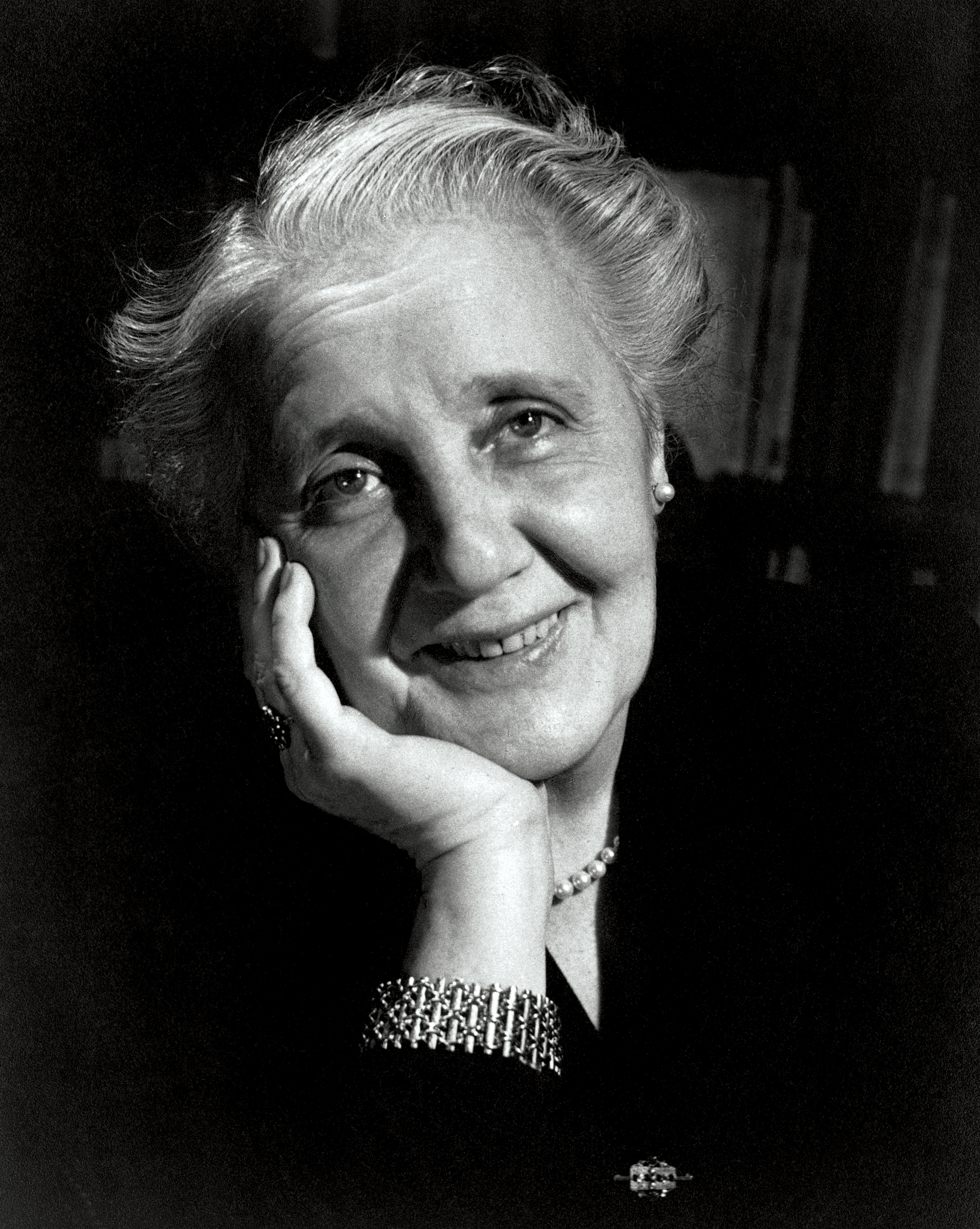
- Klein in 1952
- Born: Melanie Reizes; 30 March 1882; Vienna, Austria-Hungary
- Died: 22 September 1960 (aged 78); London, England
- Known for: Object relations theory Therapeutic techniques for children Coining the term 'reparation' Klein's theory of splitting Projective identification Envy and gratitude Unconscious phantasy
- Children: Melitta Schmideberg
- Scientific career
- Fields: Psychoanalysis

Melanie Klein (/klaɪn/; German: [klaɪn]; née Reizes; 30 March 1882 – 22 September 1960) was an Austrian-British author and psychoanalyst known for her work in child analysis. She was the primary figure in the development of object relations theory. Klein's work primarily focused on the role of ambivalence and moral ambiguity in human development. Klein suggested that pre-verbal existential anxiety in infancy catalyzed the formation of the unconscious, which resulted in the unconscious splitting of the world into good and bad idealizations. In her theory, how the child resolves that split depends on the constitution of the child and the character of nurturing the child experiences. The quality of resolution can inform the presence, absence, and/or type of distresses a person experiences later in life.

== Life ==
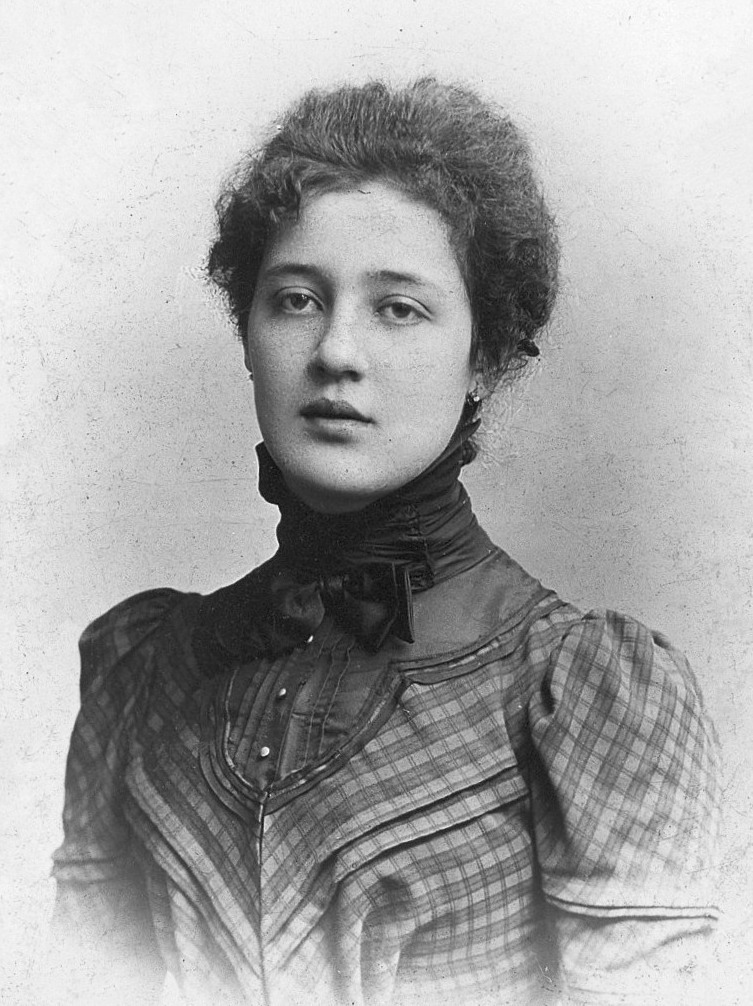
Klein c. 1900

Melanie Klein was born into a Jewish family and spent most of her early life in Vienna, Austria. She was the fourth and final child of parents Moriz, a doctor, and Libussa Reizes.

At the age of 21, she married an industrial chemist, Arthur Klein, and soon after gave birth to their first child, Melitta. Klein then had her second child, Hans, in 1907 and her third and final child, Erich, in 1914. After having those two additional children, Klein suffered from clinical depression as these pregnancies took a toll on her. This and her unhappy marriage soon led Klein to seek treatment. Shortly after her family moved to Budapest in 1910, Klein began a course of therapy with psychoanalyst Sándor Ferenczi. It was during their time together that Klein developed an interest in the study of psychoanalysis.

Encouraged by Ferenczi, Klein began her studies by observing her own children. During this time, there was little documentation on the topic of psychoanalysis in children. Klein took advantage of this by developing her "play technique".

== Contributions to psychoanalysis ==
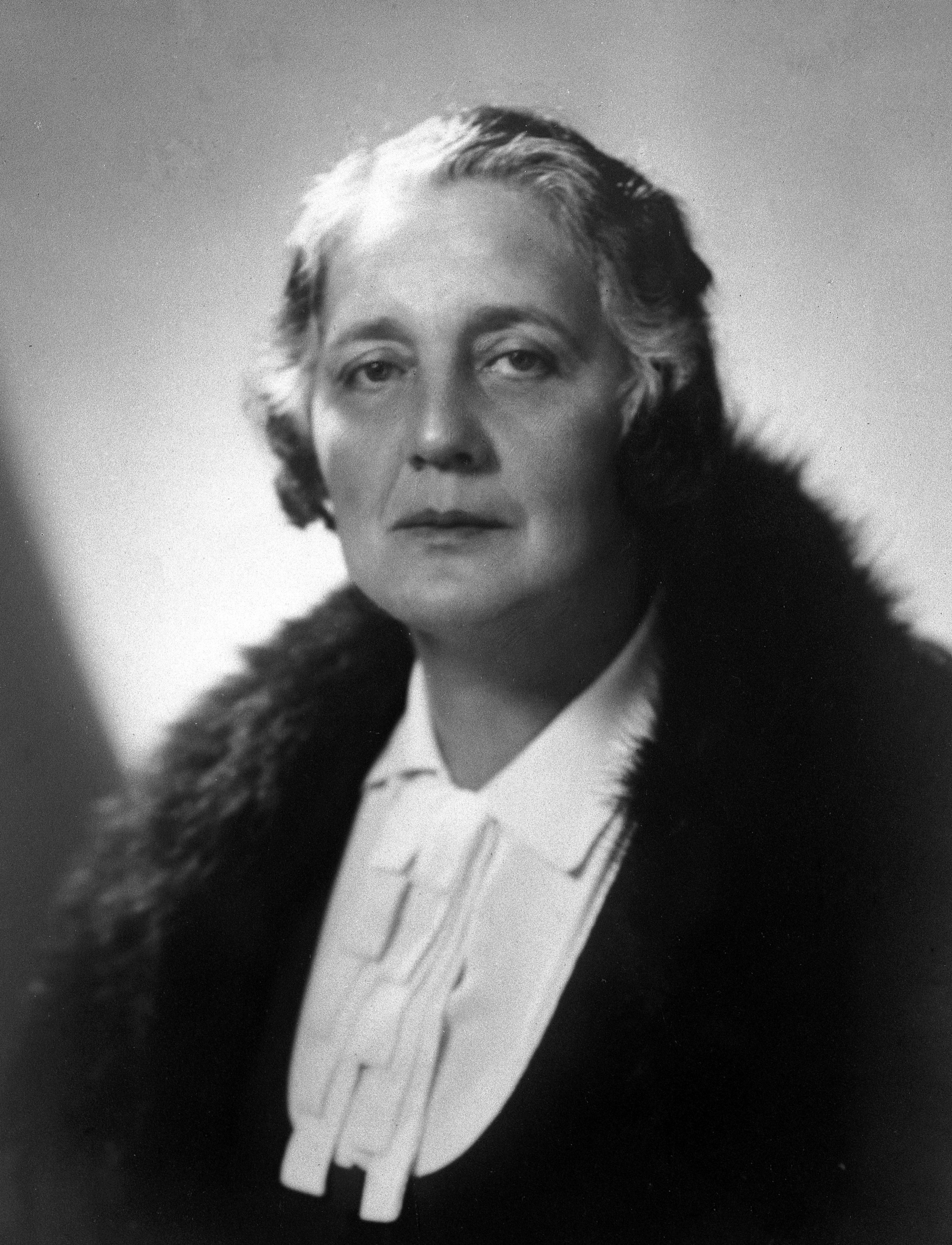
Klein c. 1927

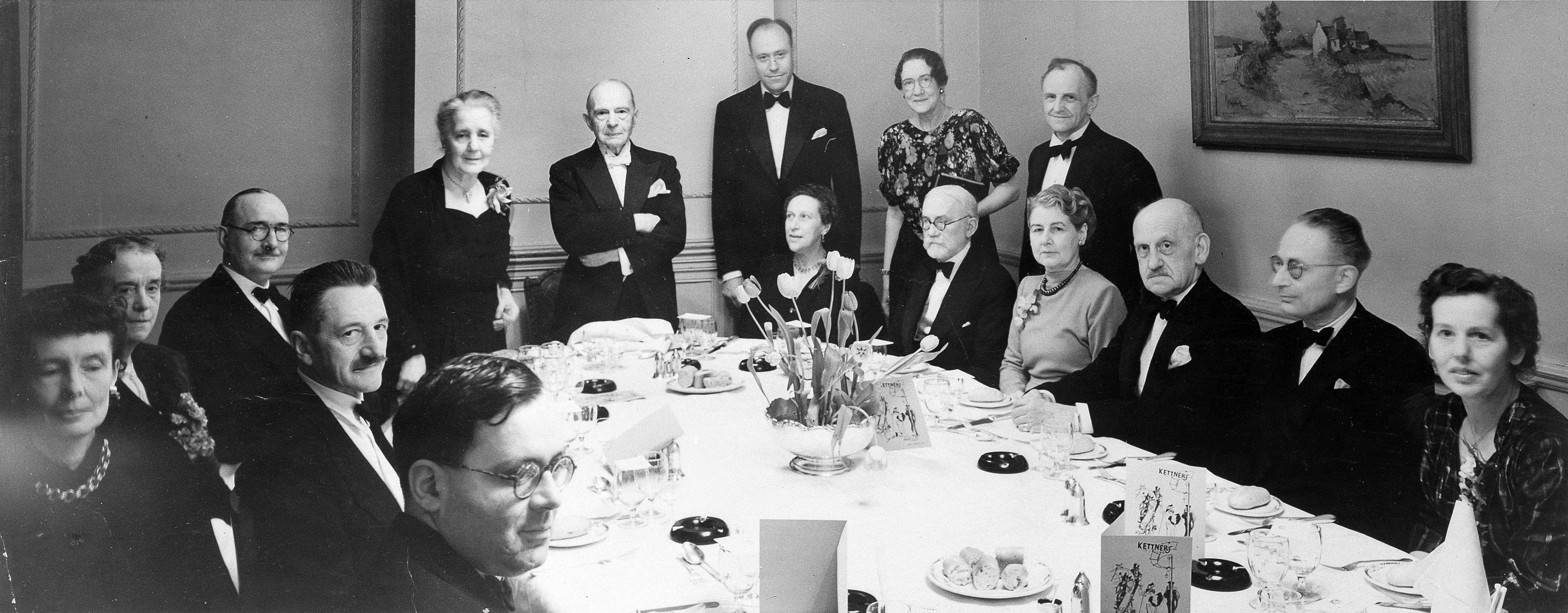
A dinner to celebrate Klein's 70th birthday

Klein's theoretical work incorporates Freud's belief in the existence of the death drive, reflecting the notion that all living organisms are inherently drawn toward an "inorganic" state, and therefore, somehow, towards death. In psychological terms, Eros (properly, the life drive), the postulated sustaining and uniting principle of life, is thereby presumed to have a companion force, Thanatos (death drive), which seeks to terminate and disintegrate life (although Freud never used the term "Thanatos" in his own writing). Both Freud and Klein regarded these "bio-mental" forces as the foundations of the psyche. These primary unconscious forces, whose mental matrix is the id, spark the ego—the experiencing self—into activity. Id, ego, and superego, to be sure, were merely shorthand terms (similar to the instincts) referring to highly complex and mostly uncharted psychodynamic operations.

== Infant observations ==
Klein talks about the "apathetic" baby. She says that it is easy to mistake a baby that enjoys their food and cries a little for a happy baby. Development later shows that some of these easy-going babies are not happy. Their lack of crying may be due to some kind of apathy. It is hard to assess a young person's state of mind without allowing for a great complexity of emotions. When these babies are followed up on we see that a great deal of difficulty appears. These children are often shy of people, and their interest in the external world, play, and learning is inhibited. They are often slow at learning to crawl and walk because there seems to be little incentive. They are often showing signs of neurosis as their development goes on.

== Child analysis ==
After exploring ultra-aggressive fantasies of hate, envy, and greed in very young and disturbed children, Melanie Klein proposed a model of the human psyche that linked significant oscillations of state, with the postulated Eros or Thanatos pulsations. She named the state of the mind in which the sustaining principle of life dominates the depressive position. A depressive position is the understanding that good and evil things are one. The fears and worries about the fate of the people destroyed in the child's fantasy are all in the latter. The child tries to repair his mother through phantasm and behavior therapy, overcoming his depression and anxiety. He employs phantasies representing love and restoration to restore the others he destroyed. Morality is based on the standpoint of depression. Klein named it the depressive position because the efforts to restore the integrity of the damaged object are accompanied by depression and despair. After all, the child doubts whether it can fix everything it hurts. Many consider this to be her most significant contribution to psychoanalytic philosophy. She later developed her ideas about an earlier developmental psychological state corresponding to the disintegrating tendency of life, which she called the paranoid-schizoid position.

According to Klein, events such as wars affect the course of child development. A shift occurs from a paranoid-schizoid position to a depressive position. The paranoid-schizoid position is characterized by splitting the self and other into dichotomous good and evil with little ability to integrate the two or to recognize the relativity of these terms.

== Object relation theory ==
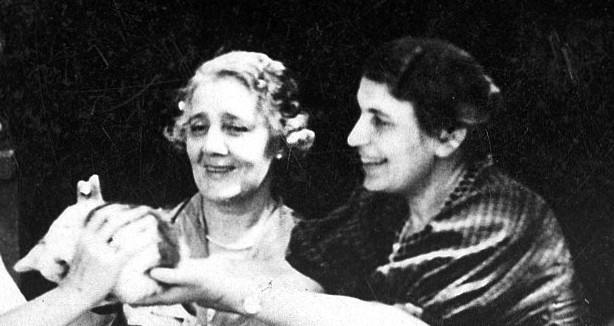
Klein and Anna Freud

Klein is known to be one of the primary founders of object relations theory. This theory of psychoanalysis is based on the assumption that all individuals have within them an internalized, and primarily unconscious, realm of relationships. These relationships refer not only to the world around the individual but more specifically to other individuals surrounding the subject. Object relation theory focuses primarily on the interaction individuals have with others, how those interactions are internalized, and how these now internalized object relations affect one's psychological framework. The term "object" refers to the potential embodiment of fear, desire, envy or other comparable emotions. The object and the subject are separated,

Klein's approach differed from Anna Freud's ego-psychology approach. Klein explored the interpersonal aspect of the structural model. In the mid-1920s, she thought differently about the first mode of defense. Klein thought it was expulsion while Freud speculated it was repression (Stein, 1990). Klein suggested that the infant could relate—from birth—to its mother, who was deemed either "good" or "bad" and internalized as archaic part-object, thereby developing a phantasy life in the infant. Because of this supposition, Klein's beliefs required her to proclaim that an ego exists from birth, enabling the infant to relate to others early in life (Likierman & Urban, 1999).

== Envy and Gratitude ==
Melanie Klein's last major work Envy and Gratitude was published in 1957 and is considered the culmination of her theoretical contributions.

=== Primitive envy ===
Klein defines envy as "the angry feeling that another person possesses and enjoys something desirable—the envious impulse being to take it away or to spoil it."

In Klein's theory, there is an important distinction between envy and jealousy: "Jealousy is based on love and aims at the possession of the loved object and the removal of the rival; envy is the angry feeling that another person possesses and enjoys something desirable—the envious impulse being to take it away or to spoil it."

Envy is directed towards the creative capacity of the good object that is both loved and hated. The infant envies the breast (the good object) that feeds and comforts them, and wants to spoil and destroy its goodness. This sadistic impulse arises from a kind of pain stemming from the infant's inability to satisfy its own needs.

=== Relation to the good object ===
According to Klein, envy threatens the capacity to establish a relationship with the good object. Excessive envy can prevent the infant from forming a positive relationship with the breast and internalizing it as a good internal object. This undermines the process of establishing a good internal object, which is vital for healthy ego development. Klein also distinguishes between envy and greed: "Excessive greed aims at complete scooping out, sucking dry, and devouring the breast; whereas envy aims at poisoning and destroying the good breast so that it cannot be enjoyed."

Excessive envy can impede the transition to the depressive position because the individual cannot develop the capacity to feel concern for and repair the damaged good object. Clinically, this manifests in the continued use of splitting and other primitive defense mechanisms.

=== Capacity for gratitude ===
Klein argues that the most important emotional force against envy is gratitude. Gratitude is the foundation for internalizing and preserving the good object. The feeling of gratitude enables the infant to recognize and appreciate the love and care received from the mother. "The feeling of gratitude arises from the full satisfaction of a good experience. Gratitude mitigates the feeling of envy because when we are grateful, we understand the value of what we possess rather than focusing on what others have." According to Klein, the capacity to feel gratitude nurtures trust, love, and generosity, and contributes to the enrichment of the individual's inner world. This capacity plays a central role in the successful resolution of the depressive position.

=== Clinical significance ===
The concepts of "envy and gratitude" occupy a central place in Klein's clinical work. Klein specifically studied how the feeling of envy affects the therapeutic relationship in severe narcissistic and psychotic disorders.

According to Klein, excessive envy hinders treatment in two ways:

1. By devaluing the therapist's help and interpretations
2. By undermining the patient's capacity for insight and progress

Envy can jeopardize the therapeutic relationship and the healing process because the patient becomes unable to accept the analyst's help. In the therapeutic process, the analysis of envious feelings and the development of the capacity for gratitude are key to successful treatment.

Klein's concepts still hold great importance in contemporary psychoanalytic practice, especially in the treatment of severe personality disorders and narcissistic structures. Clinicians use Klein's conceptual framework to understand and work with the patient's envious feelings.

== Influence on feminism ==
In Dorothy Dinnerstein's book The Mermaid and the Minotaur (1976) (also published in the UK as The Rocking of the Cradle and the Ruling of the World), drawing from elements of Sigmund Freud's psychoanalysis, particularly as developed by Klein, Dinnerstein argued that sexism and aggression are both inevitable consequences of child-rearing being left exclusively to women. Klein concluded that the infant's first and major concern is fear of being annihilated by the anger it feels, for example, when it is frustrated by the mother. As a solution, Dinnerstein proposed that men and women equally share infant and childcare responsibilities. She argues that if men shared childcare equally with women, they would be equally involved in the phantasies associated with infancy's paranoid and depressive worries. There would then be no way out of dealing with these anxieties and creating a more realistic attitude toward both men and women. This book became a classic of U.S. second-wave feminism and was later translated into seven languages.

Feminists critical of Klein's work have drawn attention to an unwarranted assumption of a natural causality connecting sex, gender and desire, stereotypical gender descriptions and in general a prescriptive normative privileging of heterosexual dynamics.

== In popular culture ==
- Melanie Klein was the subject of a 1988 play by Nicholas Wright, entitled Mrs. Klein. Set in London in 1934, the play involves a conflict between Melanie Klein and her daughter Melitta Schmideberg, after the death of Melanie's son Hans Klein. The depiction of Melanie Klein is quite unfavorable: the play suggests that Hans' death was a suicide and also reveals that Klein had analysed these two children. In the original production at the Cottesloe Theatre in London, Gillian Barge played Melanie Klein, with Zoë Wanamaker and Francesca Annis playing the supporting roles. In the 1995 New York revival of the play, Melanie Klein was played by Uta Hagen, who described the role as one that she was meant to play. The play was broadcast on the British radio station BBC Radio 4 in 2008 and was revived at the Almeida Theatre in London in October 2009, with Clare Higgins cast as Melanie Klein.
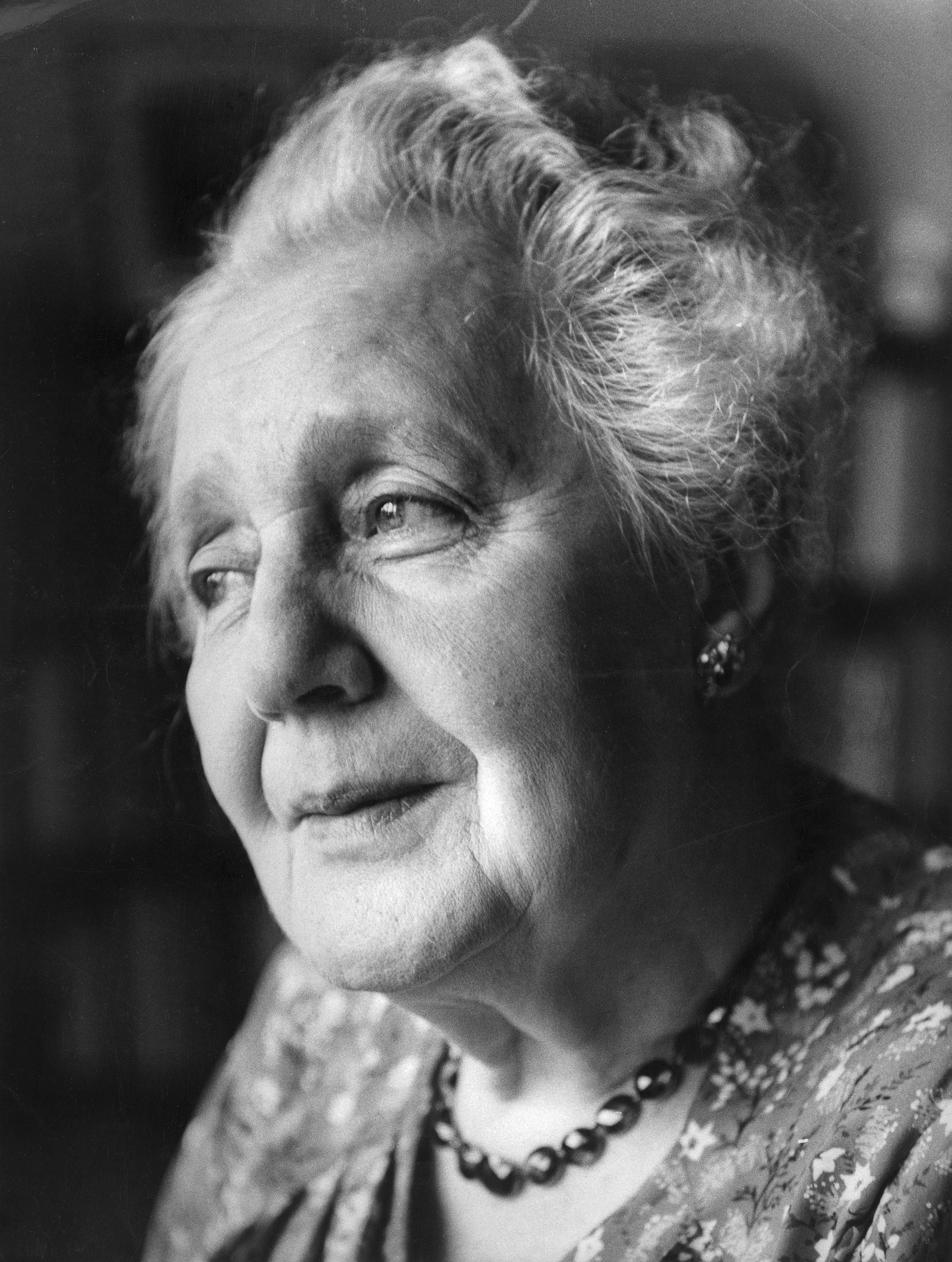
  Klein in the 1950s
- The indie band Volcano Suns dedicated their first record The Bright Orange Years to Klein for her work on childhood aggression.
- Scottish author Alexander McCall Smith makes extensive use of Melanie Klein and her theories in his 44 Scotland Street series. One of the characters, Irene, has an obsession with Kleinian theory, and uses it to "guide" her in the upbringing of her son, Bertie.

== Bibliography ==
Melanie Klein's works are collected in four volumes:

- The Collected Writings of Melanie Klein
  - Volume 1 – Love, Guilt and Reparation: And Other Works 1921–1945, London: Hogarth Press.
  - Volume 2 – The Psychoanalysis of Children, London: Hogarth Press.
  - Volume 3 – Envy and Gratitude, London: Hogarth Press.
  - Volume 4 – Narrative of a Child Analysis, London: Hogarth Press.

== See also ==
- Edna O'Shaughnessy
- Ignacio Matte Blanco
- Joseph J. Sandler
- Nina Searl
- Reparation (psychoanalysis)
- Object relations theory
- Symbolic equation

== Sources ==
- Grosskurth, Phyllis (1986). Melanie Klein: Her World and Her Work. New York: Alfred A. Knopf. ISBN 1-56821-445-6.
- Hinshelwood, Robert, Susan Robinson, Oscar Zarate, Introducing Melanie Klein, Icon Books, UK 2003
- Hinshelwood, Robert, A Dictionary of Kleinian Thought, Free Association Books, UK 1989
- Hinshelwood, Robert, Clinical Klein, Free Association Books UK, 1993
- Klein, Melanie, "The autobiography of Melanie Klein", ed. Janet Sayers with John Forrester, Psychoanalysis and History 15.2 (2013), pp. 127–63
- Jacobus, Mary L., The Poetics of Psychoanalysis: In the Wake of Klein, Oxford University Press, 2006, ISBN 0-19-924636-X
- Kristeva, Julia, Melanie Klein (European Perspectives: A Series in Social Thought and Cultural Criticism) tr. Ross Guberman, Columbia University Press, 2004
- Meltzer, Donald (Information in French) The Kleinian Development (New edition), Karnac Books; Reprint edition 1998, ISBN 1-85575-194-1
- Meltzer, Donald: Dream-Life: A Re-Examination of the Psycho-Analytical Theory and Technique, Karnac Books, 1983, ISBN 0-902965-17-4
- Likierman, Meira, Melanie Klein, Her Work in Context, Continuum International, Paperback, 2002
- Segal, Hanna (Information in French):
  - Klein. Karnac Books; Reprint edition (1989), ISBN 0-946439-69-9
  - The Work of Hanna Segal: A Kleinian Approach to Clinical Practice (Classical Psychoanalysis and Its Applications), Jason Aronson, 1993), ISBN 0-87668-422-3
  - "Dream, Phantasy and Art" Publisher: Routledge, 1990, ISBN 0-415-01798-X
  - Transcript of a seminar titled "Motivation: the artist and the psychoanalyst"
- John Steiner (Information in French) : "Psychic Retreats" (...) relative peace and protection from strain when meaningful contact with the analyst is experienced as(...), Routledge; 1993, ISBN 0-415-09924-2
- Alford, C. Fred, Melanie Klein and Critical Social Theory: An Account of Politics, Art, and Reason Based on Her Psychoanalytic Theory, Yale University Press, 1990
- Rose, Jacqueline (1993). Why war?: psychoanalysis, politics, and the return to Melanie Klein. Oxford, UK Cambridge, Mass., USA: B. Blackwell. ISBN 978-0-631-18924-4.
- Rosenfeld, Herbert: Impasse and Interpretation: Therapeutic and Anti-Therapeutic Factors in the Psycho-Analytic Treatment of Psychotic, Borderline, and Neurotic Patients, Tavistock Publications, 1987, ISBN 0-422-61010-0
- Segal, Julia: (1992). Melanie Klein. London: Sage. ISBN 0-8039-8477-4
- Britton, Ronald: Sex, Death, and the Superego: Experiences in Psychoanalysis, Karnac Books; 2003, ISBN 1-85575-948-9
- Britton, Ronald: Belief and Imagination, Taylor & Francis Ltd, 1998, ISBN 0-415-19438-5
- Lauret, Monique, and Jean-Philippe Raynaud, Melanie Klein, une pensée vivante, Presses Universitaires de France, 2008, ISBN 978-2-13-057039-4
- Klein, Melanie (1987). Mitchell, Juliet (ed.). The selected Melanie Klein. New York: Free Press. ISBN 978-0-02-921481-7.
