= Kate Scharff =

- Born: Katherine E. Scharff
- Education: Franklin & Marshall College (BA); Columbia University School of Social Work (MS)
- Occupations: Psychotherapist, author
- Known for: We Need to Talk About Divorce
- Spouse: Doug Lederman
- Parent(s): David E. Scharff; Jill Savege Scharff
- Website: katescharff.com

Kate Scharff is an American psychotherapist and author based in Bethesda, Maryland. She is the author of Therapy Demystified (2004), co-author with psychologist Lisa Herrick, PhD of two American Bar Association guides for divorce professionals, and author of the children's nonfiction book We Need to Talk About Divorce (2025), which received starred reviews from Kirkus Reviews and School Library Journal. She practices individual, couple and family psychotherapy and works as a collaborative divorce coach and child specialist and family mediator.

== Early life and education ==
Scharff is the daughter of psychoanalyst David E. Scharff, M.D. and the step-daughter of psychoanalyst Jill Savege Scharff, M.D., co-founders of the International Psychotherapy Institute. She received a Bachelor of Arts from Franklin & Marshall College in 1986 and a Master of Science in social work from the Columbia University School of Social Work in 1989.

== Career ==
Scharff began her career in New York City, working at the Federation Employment and Guidance Service and the Jewish Board of Family and Children's Services, and served as an adjunct clinical professor at the New York University Graduate School of Social Work from 1992 to 1994. She has maintained a private psychotherapy practice since 1989, and is licensed in Washington, D.C., Maryland and Virginia.

From 1997 to 2010 she founded and directed the Center for Relationships in Transition , a clinical organization serving separating and divorcing families. She also founded and served as Director of IPI Metro, the Washington, DC-area hub of the International Psychotherapy Institute. In 2010 she co-founded the Collaborative Practice Center of Greater Washington, where she was a Principal until 2020.

=== Collaborative divorce ===
Scharff is a founding board member and past president of the DC Academy of Collaborative Professionals and a member of the International Academy of Collaborative Professionals and the Association of Family and Conciliation Courts. She was founding faculty of the Collaborative Practice Training Institute and a founding board member of the pro bono collaborative law projects of Washington, D.C. and Maryland.

With Lisa Herrick, PhD she wrote Navigating Emotional Currents in Collaborative Divorce: A Guide to Enlightened Team Practice (American Bar Association, 2010), which addresses how marital dynamics and prior trauma are re-enacted within the collaborative process. The book has been cited in legal scholarship on Collaborative Law, including in the Maryland Law Review. Scharff and Herrick's second co-authored volume, Mastering Crucial Moments in Separation and Divorce: A Multidisciplinary Guide to Excellence in Practice and Outcome, was published by the ABA in 2016.

In 2012 Washingtonian included Scharff in its list of recommended couples therapists in the Washington area, compiled from recommendations by peers and divorce attorneys.

From 2018 to 2024 Scharff hosted the podcast Divorce on Planet Earth.

=== Teaching ===
Scharff teaches on psychodynamic psychotherapy, parenting, divorce, and Collaborative Divorce, and conducts trainings for family law attorneys and mental health professionals. She has taught in the International Psychotherapy Institute's psychoanalytic couple therapy program, presenting sessions on the effect of divorce on children and adults.

=== Writing ===
Scharff's first book, Therapy Demystified: An Insider's Guide to Getting the Right Help, Without Going Broke, was published by Marlowe & Company in 2004. Her journal article "Therapeutic supervision with families of high-conflict divorce" appeared in the International Journal of Applied Psychoanalytic Studies in 2004, and she has contributed chapters to edited volumes including Tuning the Therapeutic Instrument (Jason Aronson, 2000), New Paradigms for Treating Relationships (Jason Aronson, 2007), Psychoanalytic Couple Therapy (Routledge, 2014), and An Introduction to Child and Adolescent Psychoanalytic Psychotherapy (Karnac, 2024)

We Need to Talk About Divorce: An Important Book About Separation, Stepfamilies, and Feeling Heard, illustrated by Annika Le Large, was published in March, 2025 by Neon Squid, an imprint of Macmillan Publishers. Aimed at readers aged roughly 8 to 14, the book is arranged chronologically from a child's first reaction to a separation through new living arrangements, stepfamilies and parental dating. Kirkus Reviews gave it a starred review, calling it "optimistic, empathetic, and nuanced—in short, required reading for young people navigating divorce." School Library Journal also awarded a starred review, describing it as "both compassionate and comprehensive." The book was recommended by BookTrust and Children's Books Ireland, named to the Children's Book Council's 2026 Teacher Favorites list, selected for the Bank Street College of Education's Best Children's Books of the Year, and included in Oprah Daily's list of the best divorce books for children. It has been translated into Spanish (Hablemos del divorcio, Editorial Contrapunto), Estonian (Me peame rääkima lahutusest, Julius Press, 2026), and Dutch (We moeten het hebben over scheiden, Boycott).

== Personal life ==
Scharff is married to Doug Lederman, co-founder of Inside Higher Ed and founder of Lederman Advisory Services and they live in Bethesda, Maryland.
