= Wesleying =

- Type: Blog
- Founded: August 23, 2006
- Website: wesleying.org

Wesleying is a blog dedicated to stories and news relating to student life at Wesleyan University in Middletown, Connecticut. All of its content is written by current Wesleyan undergraduates. As an early example of a campus-wide student blog, Wesleying provided inspiration to several other college blogs and local publications.

== Founding ==
Wesleying was founded on August 23, 2006, by Xue Sun and Holly Wood, both members of the class of 2008. They intended to create an online space that brought together the Wesleyan community, which they considered fragmented at the time. "

One large part of Wesleying's mission is that the blog is not affiliated with the university in any official capacity. This idea has been a cornerstone of the blog since its development, as it allows students to voice concerns without administrative interference. It is also a virtue that separates it from many of its peer institutions' college blogs.

== Wesleying Today ==
Wesleying tends to get anywhere from 7,000 to 9,000 views per day during the semester, hitting 10,000-12,000 views on extremely busy days. The most recent record number of views in one day was 16,748 on October 29, 2012. The most views for the blog in one day was 42,085 on May 6, 2009 when student Johanna Justin-Jinich was murdered inside the campus bookstore.

Over the years, Wesleying has grown into a new outlet for important or controversial Wesleyan events, as well as national or global emergencies. The blog covered an incident of Fountain Avenue in 2008 when police swarmed a party on the college campus; the 2009 on-campus shooting; the snowstorm that overtook New England during 2011; and the Newtown shooting in 2012. Claire Potter, blogger for the Chronicle of Higher Education and former Wesleyan professor, praised the Wesleying staff for their reporting on the 2009 shooting, calling it "smart, concise, non-sensational, and informative."

In 2012, Wesleying broke the news that Wesleyan would no longer be 100% need-blind for first-year domestic applicants, causing vocal protest among various students and alumni. The issue was later covered by The New York Times, NPR, the Associated Press, and other media outlets.

=== Subsequent leadership ===
After Sun and Wood graduated in 2008, Justin LaSelva '09 and Ashik Siddique '10 took over leadership roles of Wesleying. Once Siddique graduated, Zach Schonfeld '13 took over as the leader and editor of Wesleying after "casually inheriting" the blog from Siddique.

=== Recognition and influence ===
In 2007, Wesleying won the award for "Best Alternative Media Outlet" from The Paper Trail, a segment of the Education section of U.S. News & World Report, beating out blogs of much larger universities.

Several blogs have cited Wesleying as inspiration for their founding. The Middletown Eye reports that it "might never have opened, if it wasn't for the inspiration provided by the intrepid bloggers of Wesleying." MiddBlog, the campus blog for Middlebury College, also says under their mission statement that their "site was inspired by a student project called Wesleying at Wesleyan University"; Middlebury's newer event website Middbeat also cites Wesleying as a source of inspiration for the site. Additionally, Penn State blogger Davis Shaver says in The Student Newspaper Survival Guide that Wesleying served as inspiration for starting the blog Onward State.

The blog has been cited by several publications, including The New York Times, BuzzFeed, The Daily Beast, Gawker, Stereogum, Jezebel, Inside Higher Ed, MSN and other sources.

In April 2013, the blog's monthly page views exceeded 300,000 views.
