= Wesleyan Memorial Chapel =

Chapel at Wesleyan University in Middletown, Connecticut

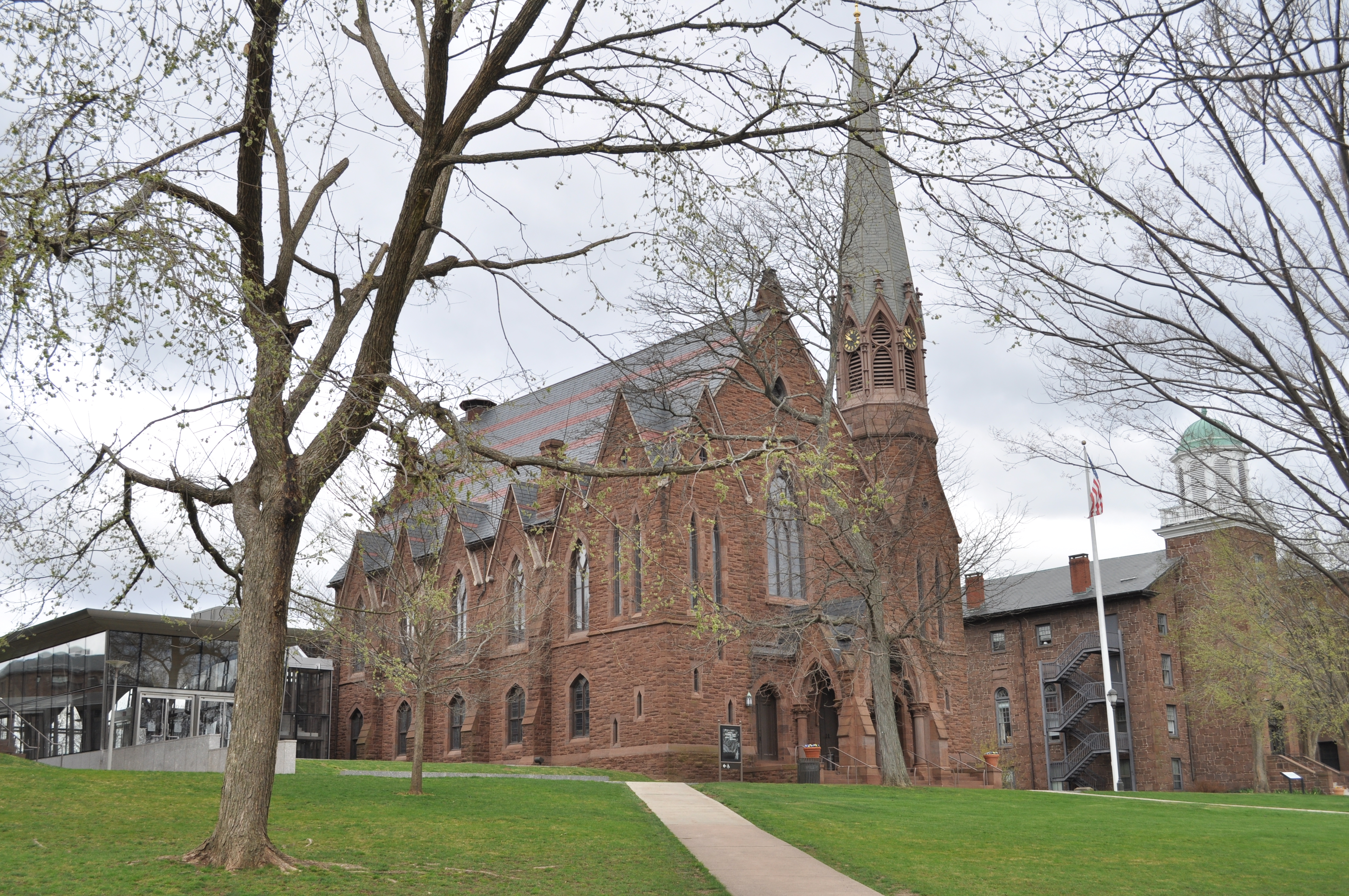
- View of the Wesleyan University Memorial Chapel and the Zelnick Pavilion in 2012
- Interactive map of the Wesleyan Memorial Chapel area

General information
- Architectural style: Mid-19th-century Gothic Revival
- Location: 221 High Street, Middletown, Connecticut
- Coordinates: 41.5557°N 72.6561°W
- Construction started: 1867
- Completed: 1871

The Wesleyan University Memorial Chapel is a Gothic Revival brownstone building at 221 High Street in Middletown, Connecticut. Its architect is unknown. More recent alterations have been from architects J.C. Cady and Henry Bacon. It stands as one of the only religious buildings known to have been constructed in Connecticut as a Civil War Memorial.

== Architectural Significance ==
As a brownstone Gothic Revival religious structure, it sits in a row of Wesleyan University buildings west of High Street in the center of campus. It was built as a memorial to Wesleyan University alumni and undergraduates who died in the Civil War.

On the south side, the second window from the back honors Wesleyan alumni and students who died from years 1861 to 1865. Eighteen names in upper and lower case are recorded although it is thought to only list half the number who actually died in service.
