= Wesleyan University =

Private liberal arts college in Middletown, Connecticut, US

- Latin: Universitas Wesleiana
- Type: Private liberal arts college
- Established: 1831; 195 years ago
- Accreditation: NECHE
- Academic affiliations: Annapolis Group; CLAC; COFHE; NAICU; Oberlin Group; Space-grant
- Endowment: $1.64 billion (2025)
- President: Michael S. Roth
- Provost: Nicole Stanton
- Faculty: 430 (fall 2020)
- Students: 3,053 (fall 2020)
- Undergraduates: 2,852 (fall 2020)
- Postgraduates: 201 (fall 2020)
- Location: Middletown, Connecticut, United States; 41.5556°N 72.6558°W
- Campus: Small city, 360 acres (150 ha)
- Student newspaper: The Wesleyan Argus
- Colors: Cardinal and black
- Nickname: Cardinals
- Sporting affiliations: NCAA Division III - NESCAC; NEISA
- Website: wesleyan.edu

Wesleyan University (/ˈwɛsliən/ WESS-lee-ən) is a private liberal arts college in Middletown, Connecticut, United States. It was founded in 1831 as a men's college under the Methodist Episcopal Church and with the support of prominent residents of Middletown it became a secular, coeducational institution.

Wesleyan is a primarily undergraduate institution with a small graduate program. It offers 47 majors as part of an open curriculum. The college accepted female applicants from 1872 to 1909, but did not become fully coeducational until 1970. Before full coeducation, Wesleyan alumni and other supporters of women's education established Connecticut College in 1912. Wesleyan, along with Amherst and Williams colleges, is part of "The Little Three." Its teams compete athletically as a member of the New England Small College Athletic Conference (NESCAC) in NCAA Division III.

== History ==
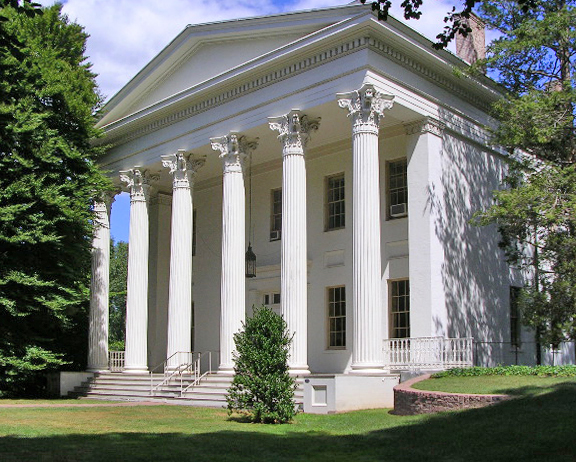
The Samuel Wadsworth Russell House (1828), home to the Philosophy department. The building was designated a National Historic Landmark in 2001 and is considered one of the finest examples of domestic Greek Revival architecture.

Before Wesleyan was founded, a military academy established by Alden Partridge existed, consisting of the campus's North and South Colleges. As this academy failed, New England Methodists bought it and founded in 1831 an all-male Methodist college. Willbur Fisk was the first president. Despite being named after John Wesley, the founder of Methodism, Wesleyan was never officially a denominational seminary, though its curriculum and campus religious life were shaped by a heavy Methodist influence. In 1871, Judd Hall was dedicated; it was named after alumnus Orange Judd and was one of the earliest academic buildings devoted exclusively to undergraduate science instruction on any American college or university campus.

The Wesleyan student body numbered about 300 in 1910 and had grown to 800 in 1960.

Wesleyan is, along with Amherst and Williams colleges, a member of the Little Three. Wesleyan began as the smallest of the three. Later on, it expanded its programs, qualifying as a university with a variety of graduate offerings and became larger than the other two.

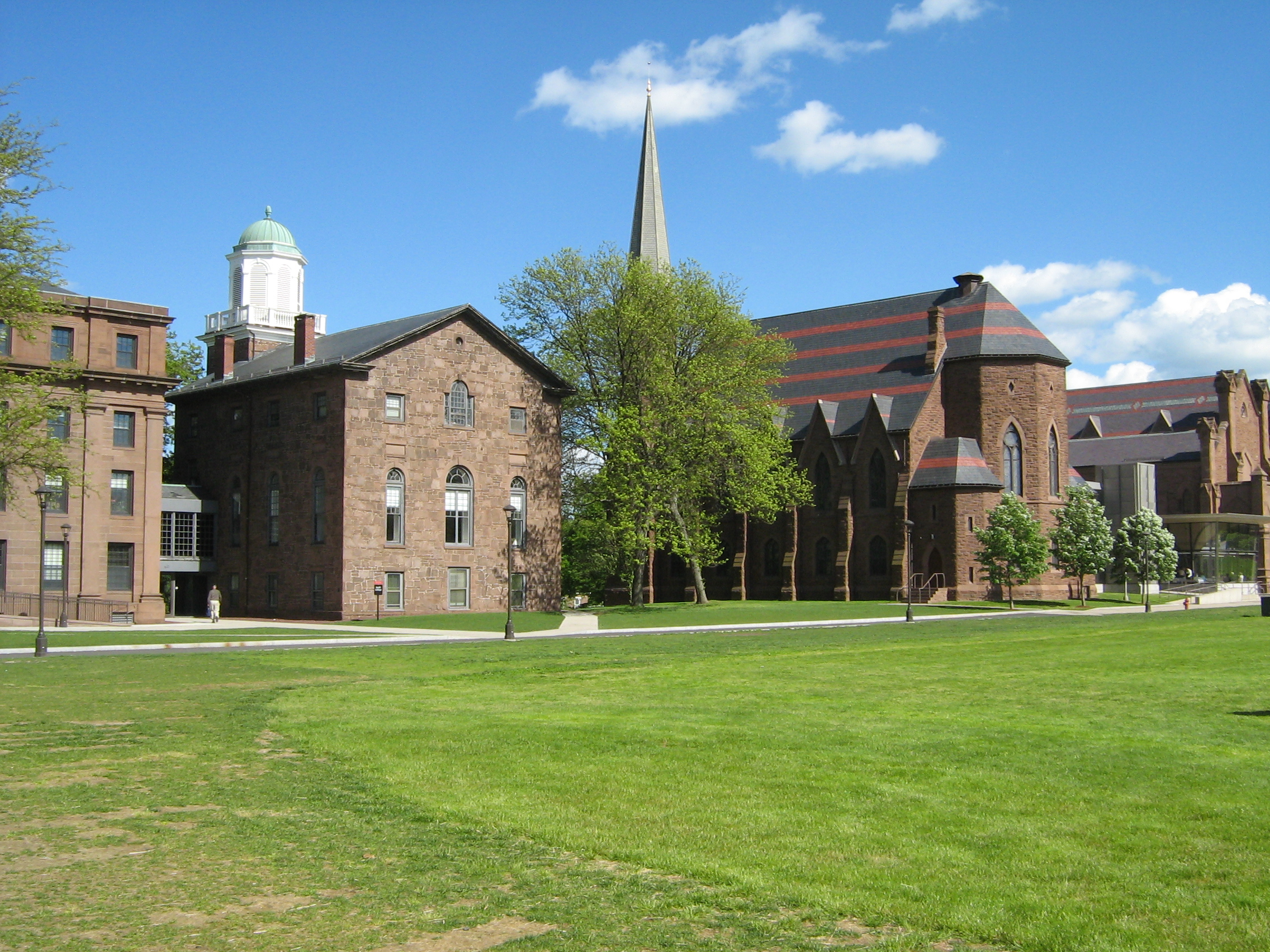
The rear of College Row: From left to right: North College, South College, Memorial Chapel, Patricelli '92 Theater (not pictured: Judd Hall)

In 1872, the institution became one of the first U.S. colleges to attempt coeducation by admitting a small number of female students, a venture then known as the "Wesleyan Experiment". In 1909, the board of trustees voted to stop admitting women as undergraduates, fearing that the school was losing its masculine image and that women would not be able to contribute to the college financially after graduation the way men could." From 1912 to 1970, Wesleyan operated again as an all-male college.

Wesleyan became independent of the Methodist church in 1937. In 2000, it was designated as a historic Methodist site.

Beginning in the late 1950s, president Victor Lloyd Butterfield began a reorganization program that resembled Harvard's house system and Yale's colleges. Undergraduate study would be divided into seven smaller residential colleges, with their own faculty and centralized graduate studies. Doctoral programs and a Center for Advanced Studies (later renamed the Center for the Humanities) were included in this reorganization.

The building program begun under this system created three residential colleges on Foss Hill (Foss Hill dormitories), followed by three more residential colleges (Lawn Avenue dormitories, now called Butterfield Colleges). Although the structures were built, only four of the proposed academic programs were begun. Two of those continue today: the College of Letters and the College of Social Studies. It has a student-faculty ratio of 7:1.

Butterfield's successors, Edwin Deacon Etherington (class of 1948) and Colin Goetze Campbell, completed many innovations begun during Butterfield's administration, including the return of women in numbers equal to men; a quadrupling in the total area of building space devoted to laboratory, studio, and performing arts instruction; and a significant rise in racial, ethnic, and religious diversity and total number of students.

== Campus ==
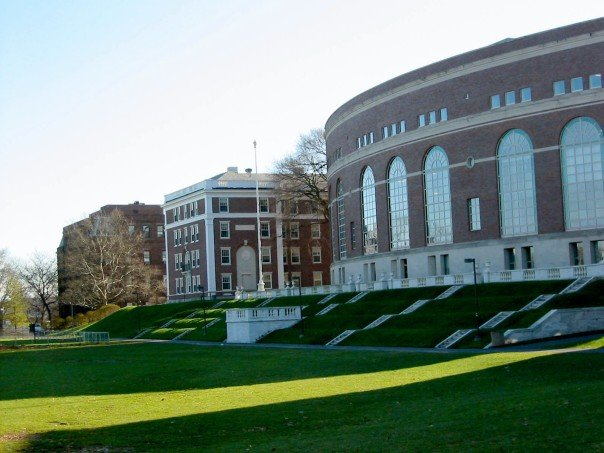
The view from Foss Hill: From left to right: Judd Hall, Harriman Hall (which houses the Public Affairs Center), and Olin Memorial Library

Wesleyan occupies a 360-acre (1.5 km^{2}) campus, with over 340 buildings, including the five-building College Row; Olin Memorial Library; Andrus Public Affairs Center; the Exley Science Center; Shanklin and Hall-Atwater Laboratories; the Van Vleck Observatory; Fayerweather with Beckham Hall; Russell House, a National Historic Landmark; the Allbritton Center; the Butterfield dormitories; the Fauver Field dormitories; and the 11-building Center for the Arts complex.

When Wesleyan University was founded in 1831, it took over a campus with two buildings, North College and South College, from 1825. These were originally constructed by the City of Middletown for use by Captain Partridge's American Literary, Scientific, and Military Academy. In 1829, after the Connecticut legislature declined it a charter to grant college degrees, Partridge moved his academy to Northfield, Vermont. The academy later became Norwich University and the Middletown buildings were acquired by Wesleyan.

The original North College was destroyed in a fire in 1906, but South College survived, being converted into offices that same year. The cupola and the belfry, which contains the Wesleyan Carillon, was designed by Henry Bacon and was added in 1916.

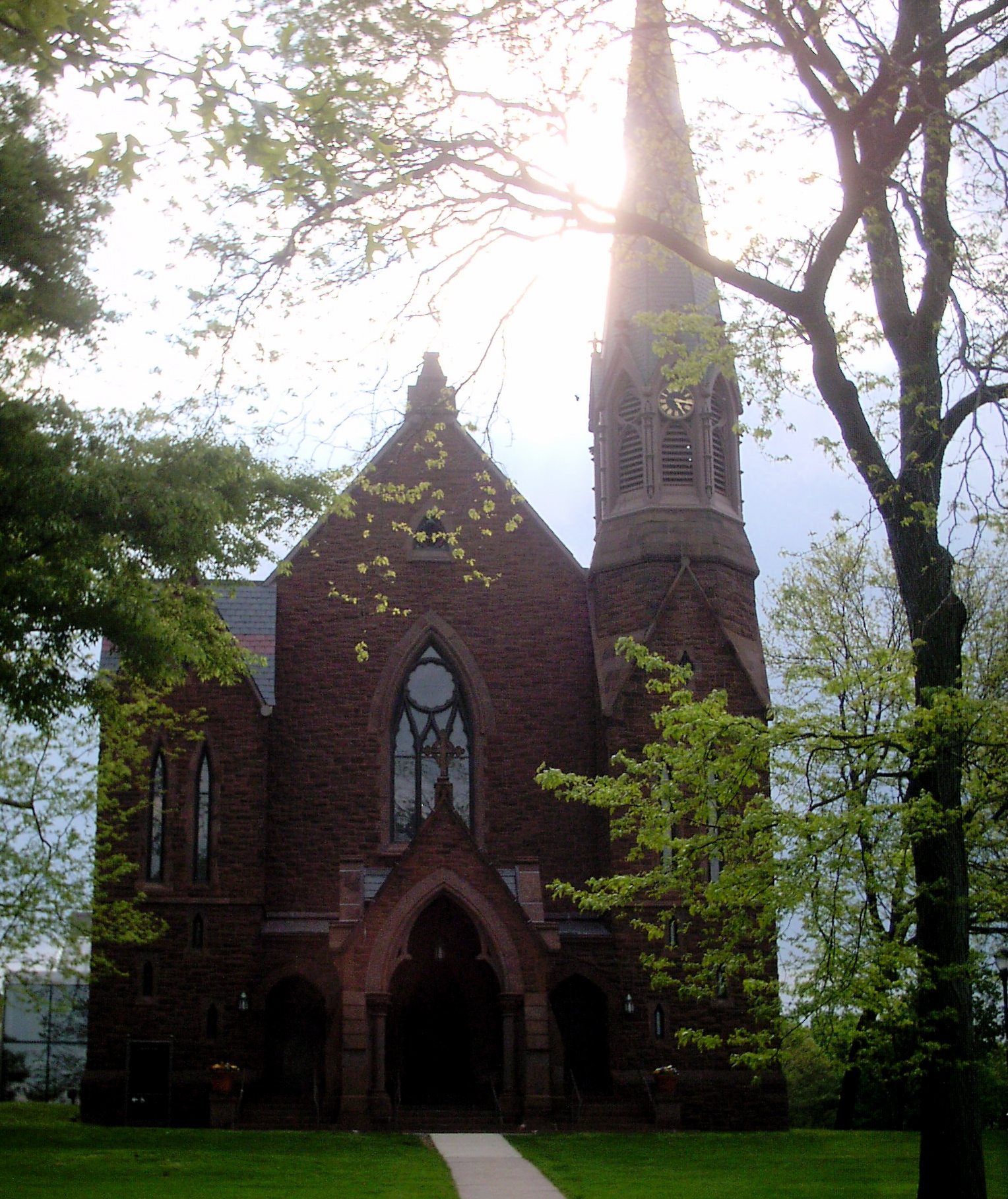
Memorial Chapel, a multi-denominational space built in 1871

The original core buildings of the campus were North College and South College. North College, a Nassau Hall-type building seen in most early American college campuses, was replaced after a fire in 1909 with the current North College. South College is the sole building from the beginning

Fayerweather-Beckham Hall (left) and Usdan University Center (right)

Memorial Chapel was completed in 1871 to honor the memory of Wesleyan students and alumni who fought in the American Civil War. Wesleyan had among the highest per capita student enlistment rates in the Union army.

The northern end of High Street contains several large buildings that were former private residences, a few of which were exceptional architectural examples. These include Russell House, a National Historic Landmark, two Alsop family houses, (one is currently the African-American Studies center with student housing; the other is the Digital Design Commons), the Davison infirmary, a second Russell family house that contains the University Development Office, and Downey House. High Street, which is the old center of campus, was once described by Charles Dickens as "the most beautiful street in America".

== Undergraduate academics ==
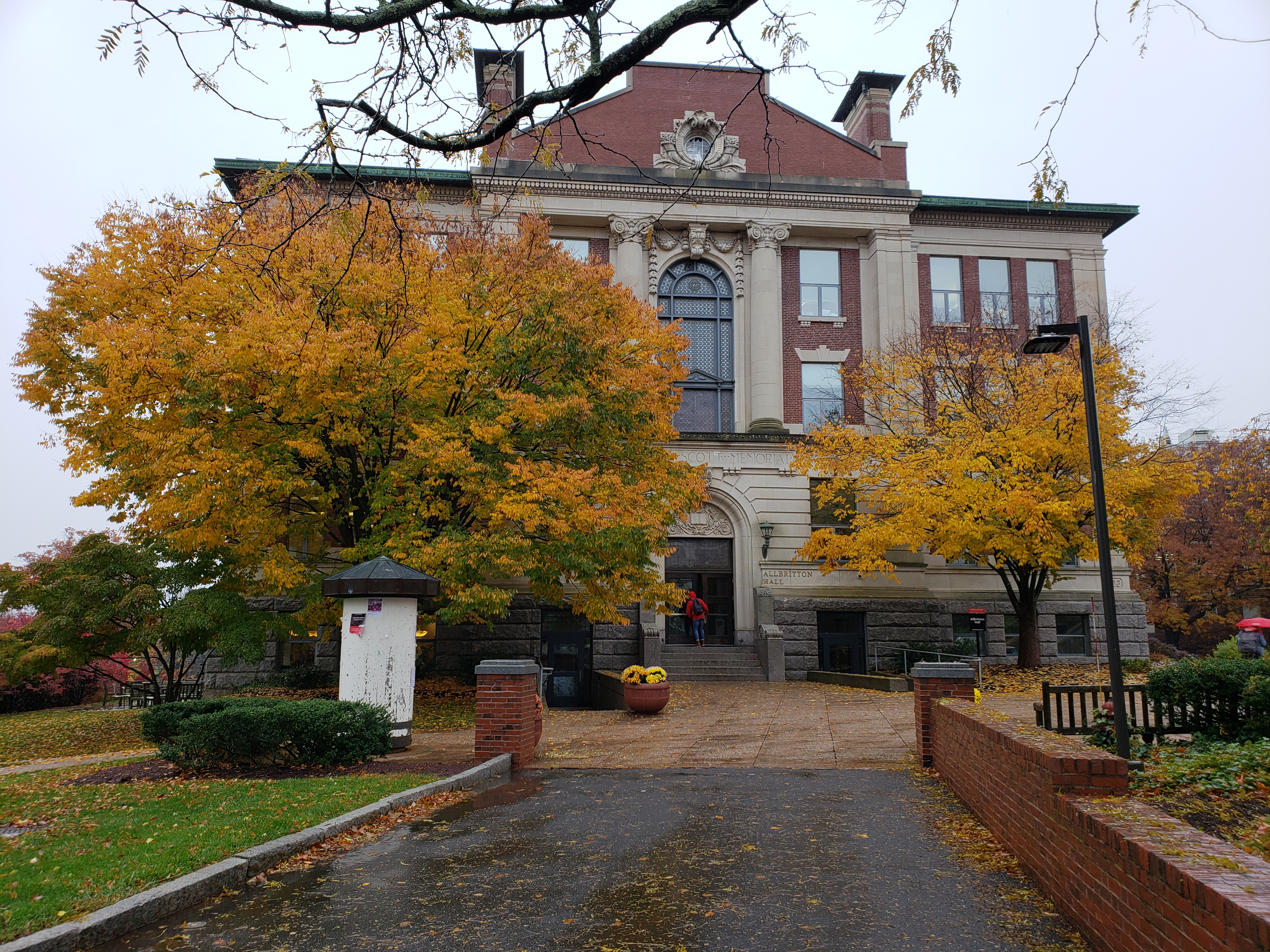
The front side of Allbritton Center, the building on Wesleyan's campus which houses the Jewett Center for Community Partnerships, Patricelli Center for Social Entrepreneurship, and the Wesleyan Media Project, as well as the student–run cafe Espwesso

Wesleyan has 46 undergraduate academic departments. 40% of Wesleyan graduates take double majors.

Wesleyan offers 3–2 programs in engineering with the California Institute of Technology and Fu Foundation School of Engineering and Applied Science. These programs allow undergraduates to receive degrees in five years from both Wesleyan (B.A.) and Caltech or Columbia (B.Sc., Engineering). Additionally, Wesleyan offers a BA/MA Program in the sciences leading to a bachelor's degree in the fourth year and a master's degree in the fifth year. Tuition for the fifth year of the master's degree is waived.

Wesleyan does not require undergraduates to take prescribed courses. Freshmen are offered First Year Initiative seminars, and undergraduates are encouraged in the first two years of study to take a minimum of two courses from two different departments in diverse subject areas.

=== Bailey College of the Environment ===
The Bailey College of the Environment, created in 2009, integrates the following components: 1) a curricular component, including the newly established environmental studies major, the environmental studies certificate, and a senior capstone project; 2) a Think Tank of Wesleyan faculty, scholars of prominence, and undergraduates whose aim is to produce scholarly work that will influence national and international thinking and action on critical environmental issues; and 3) the Collaborative Research Initiative (CRI), which is designed to encourage COE majors with the most potential to undertake environmental research.

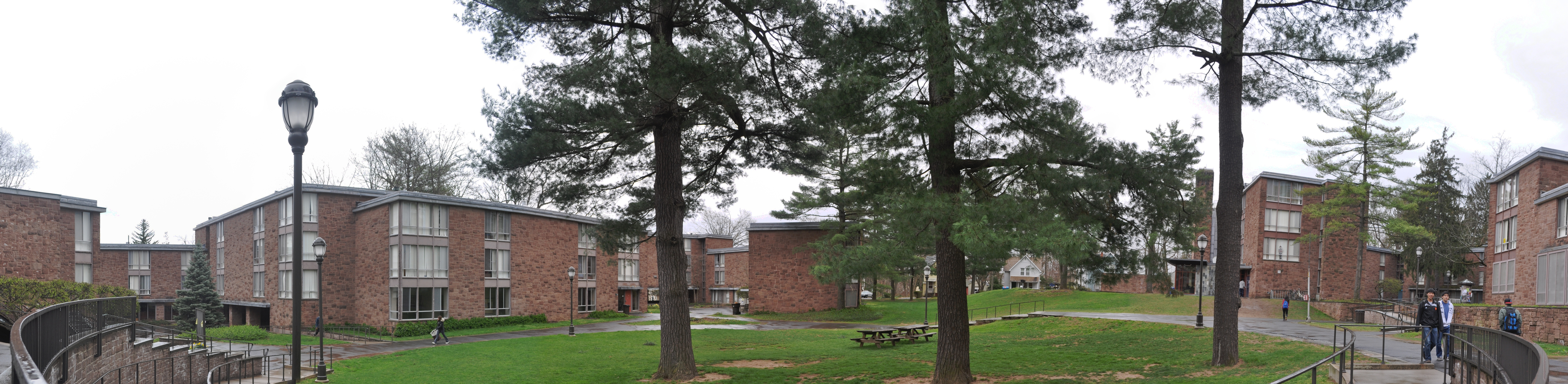
The Butterfield Colleges

=== College of Film and the Moving Image ===
The institution's Film Studies program is led by film historian Jeanine Basinger. In 2008, Vanity Fair said: "This tiny Connecticut University, with a total enrollment of 2,700, has turned out a shockingly disproportionate number of Hollywood movers and shakers." Similarly, in 2008, Variety magazine noted Basinger's contribution to the film industry through her work in the Wesleyan Film Studies program, and the large number of alumni of the program now working in Hollywood. University students, biographers, media experts, and scholars from around the world may have full access to The Wesleyan Cinema Archives, which document the film industry during the 20th century and contain the personal papers and film related materials of Ingrid Bergman, Frank Capra, Clint Eastwood, Federico Fellini, Elia Kazan, Frank Perry, Roberto Rossellini, Robert Saudek, Martin Scorsese, Gene Tierney, Raoul Walsh, and John Waters, amongst others.

In February 2013, Wesleyan announced the creation of a new College of Film and the Moving Image, incorporating the Film Studies Department, the Center for Film Studies, the Cinema Archives and the Wesleyan Film Series.

=== College of Integrative Sciences ===
The College of Integrative Sciences (CIS) provides students with an interdisciplinary education in the sciences and combines it with hands-on problem-solving skills in research. To build interdisciplinary expertise, students must complete both a traditional major in science or mathematics, as well as a "linked" major that combines components from other disciplines to form a coherent plan of study.

=== College of Letters ===
The College of Letters is an interdisciplinary humanities program offering a three-year B.A. major for the integrative study of European literature, history, and philosophy.

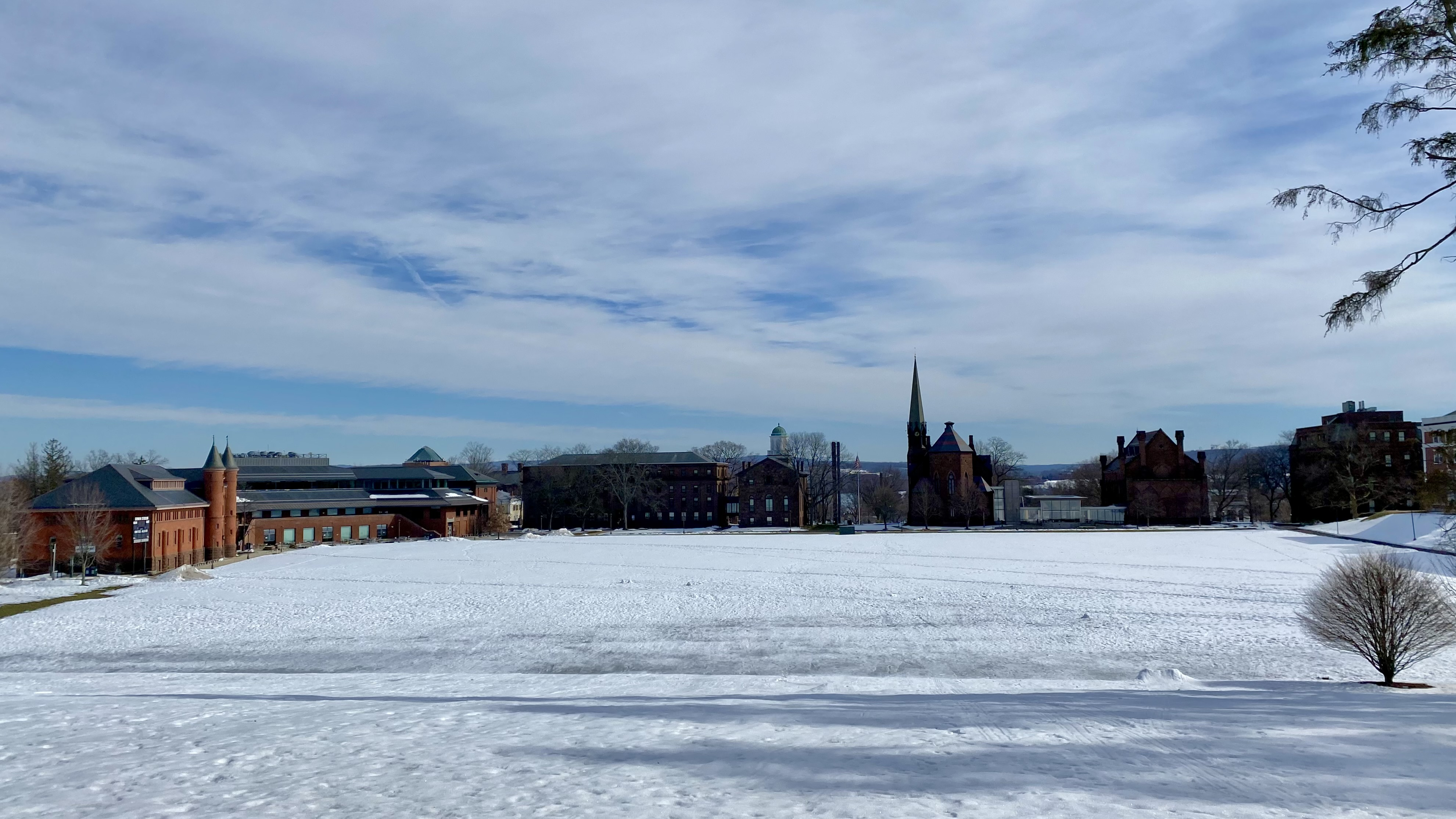
View of Andrus Field flanked by (from left to right): Fayerweather-Beckham Hall, Usdan University Center, North College, South College, Memorial Chapel, Patricelli Theater, and Judd Hall

=== College of Social Studies ===
The College of Social Studies (CSS) was founded in 1959, combining the fields of history, economics, government, and philosophy. Students take 5.5 of the program's 10.5 (thesis-writing students take 11.5) required credits during their sophomore year. Sophomore year focuses on the development of modern Western society from historical, economic, social and political perspectives, and culminates with comprehensive final exams. Seniors are required to write an honors thesis (full year) or senior essay.

=== Science and mathematics ===
Wesleyan is the sole undergraduate liberal arts college to be designated a Molecular Biophysics Predoctoral Research Training Center by the National Institutes of Health (NIH).

=== Theater ===
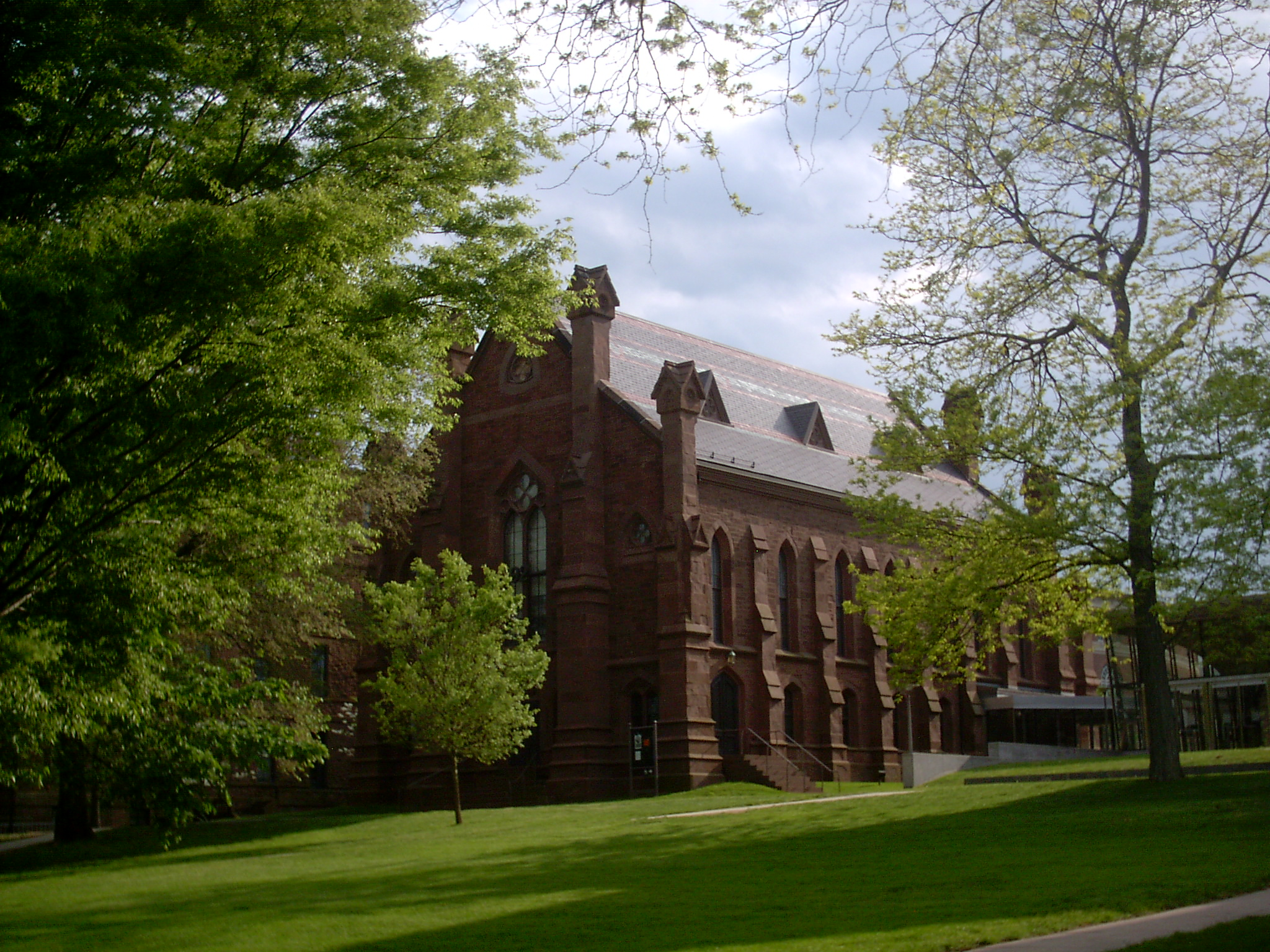
'92 Theater

Wesleyan's theater program has two theater facilities: the Theatre in the Center for the Arts, a 400-seat space; and the '92 Theater, home to Spike Tape, which is a student-run theater organization. Spike Tape produces upwards of five plays and musicals a semester, completely run by undergraduate students. They can be found at spiketapewes.com.

=== Twelve College Exchange ===
Many students participate in the Twelve College Exchange program, which allows for study for a semester or a year at another of the twelve college campuses: Amherst, Bowdoin, Connecticut College, Dartmouth, Mount Holyoke, Smith, Trinity, Vassar, Wellesley, Wheaton, and the Williams/Mystic Seaport Program in Maritime Studies.

== Graduate academics ==
Wesleyan has 11 graduate departmental programs in the sciences, mathematics, computer science, psychology, and music. Graduates receive the Master of Arts or Doctor of Philosophy degrees. Like in many traditional liberal arts colleges in the United States, all of Wesleyan's master's and bachelor's degrees are designated "of Arts" by historical precedent, regardless of the field of study. Wesleyan also offers a Graduate Liberal Studies Program. Graduates receive the Master of Arts in Liberal Studies (MALS) or the Master of Philosophy in Liberal Arts (MPHIL) degrees.

=== Massive Open Online Courses (MOOCs) ===
In 2012, Wesleyan became the first small liberal arts college to work with a private consortium to design and offer free public access online courses. Wesleyan teaches online courses in Math, Computer Science, Law, Psychology, Literature, and other subjects.

== Academics ==
=== Undergraduate admissions ===
Undergraduate admissions statistics
- 2024 entering class
- Admit rate: 16% ( +0.2)
- Yield rate: 34.7%

Test scores middle 50%^{[i]}
- SAT Total: 1500-1560
- SAT EBRW: 730-770
- SAT Math: 750-790
- ACT Composite: 33-35

High school GPA^{[ii]}
- Top 10%: 79%

For the Class of 2027 (enrolling fall 2023), Wesleyan received 14,500 applications and accepted 2,280 (15.7%). The median SAT score for admitted freshmen was 770 for math and 750 for evidence-based reading and writing. The median ACT score was 34 for the composite. Since 2014, Wesleyan has been test optional.

Admission standards at Wesleyan are considered "most selective" by U.S. News & World Report. The Princeton Review gives the institution an admissions selectivity rating of 96 out of 99.

Wesleyan announced in July 2023 that it would no longer give preference in admission to applicants with family or donor ties to the school, officially ending legacy admission at the institution.

=== Rankings and reputation ===
Academic rankings

Liberal arts
- U.S. News & World Report: 13
- Washington Monthly: 13

National
- Forbes: 51
- WSJ/College Pulse: 43

In the 2025 U.S. News & World Report rankings, Wesleyan University is tied for 13th overall among national liberal arts colleges. In the 2024 edition, it was ranked first in "Best Colleges for Veterans", 16th in "Best Value Schools", and tied for 36th in "Top Performers on Social Mobility". Wesleyan University is accredited by the New England Commission of Higher Education.

In the Forbes ranking of the top 500 American colleges for 2024–25, which combines national research universities, liberal arts colleges, and military academies in a single survey, Wesleyan University is ranked 54th overall and 12th among liberal arts colleges alone. In a 2019 Forbes ranking, Wesleyan placed ninth nationally and third among liberal arts colleges. According to a study entitled "Revealed Preference Ranking" published by the National Bureau of Economic Research, Wesleyan ranks No. 22 among all colleges and universities, and No.5 among liberal arts colleges only. The stated purpose of the NBER study was to produce a ranking system that "would be difficult for a college to manipulate" by basing it on the actual demonstrated preferences of highly meritorious students. Wesleyan was listed on the Foundation for Individual Rights in Education's 2016 "10 Worst Colleges for Free Speech".

Washington Monthly ranked Wesleyan third in 2022, out of 203 liberal arts colleges in the U.S., based on its contribution to the public good, as measured by social mobility, research, and promoting public service.

In 2019 Kiplinger ranked Wesleyan 16th of the 149 best value liberal arts colleges in the United States.

== Libraries ==
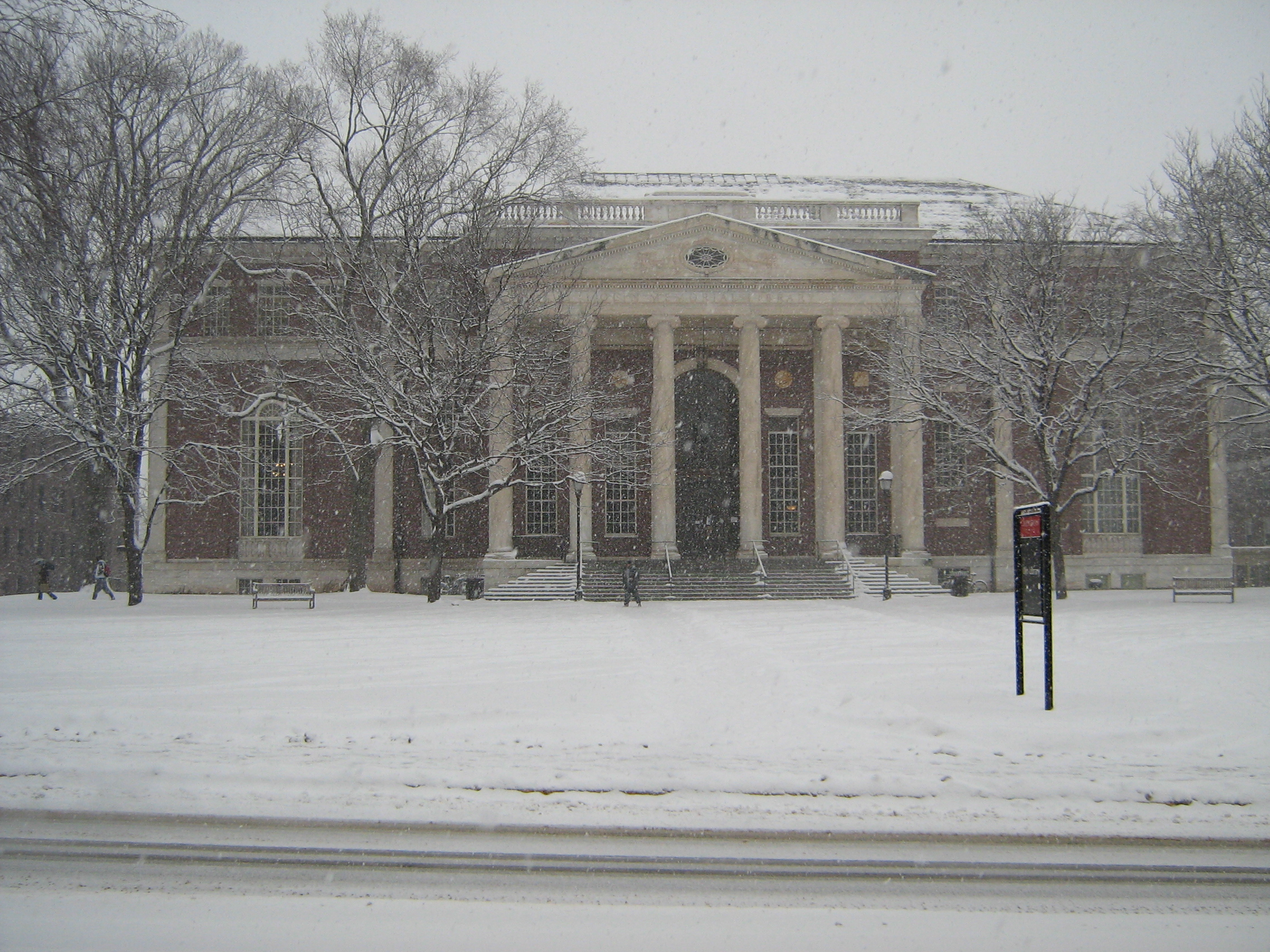
The front facade of Olin Memorial Library.

Olin Memorial Library holds more than 1.8 million volumes and about 10,000 serial subscriptions. Wesleyan's first library was Rich Hall (now '92 Theater), which was built just after the Civil War. Olin Library was designed by the firm of McKim, Mead & White, built 1925–1927, and dedicated in 1928.

The second-largest library on campus is the Science Library, which houses more than 250,000 volumes.

The Art Library is housed on the second floor of Olin Library. The Davison Art Collection holds the Print Reference Library on the ground floor of Olin Library. There is also a Music Library (which includes scores and recordings and the World Music Archives) and several department libraries.

In 2024, the sound-art work Minute/Year was installed in the main library stairwell.

== Davison Art Collection ==
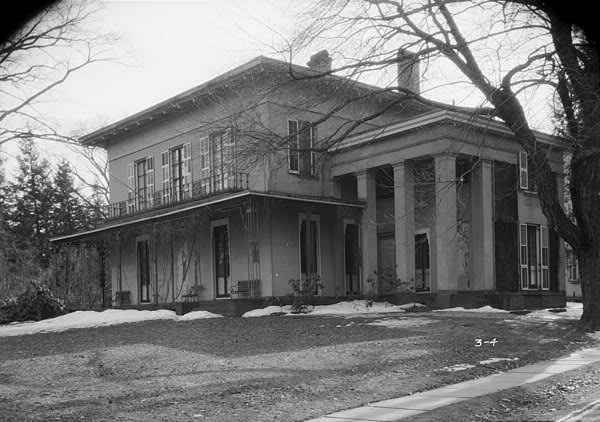
Alsop House

The Davison Art Collection, until 2019, was housed in Alsop House, which is designated a U.S. National Historic Landmark. The Collection is now located in Olin Memorial Library. The Davison Art Collection is a large collection consisting primarily of works on paper, including 18,000 prints, 6,000 photographs, several hundred drawings, a small number of paintings, and three-dimensional objects (including artists' books, sculptures, and other objects). The print collection has works by Dürer, Goya, Rembrandt, Kara Walker, Manet, Norma Morgan, and others.

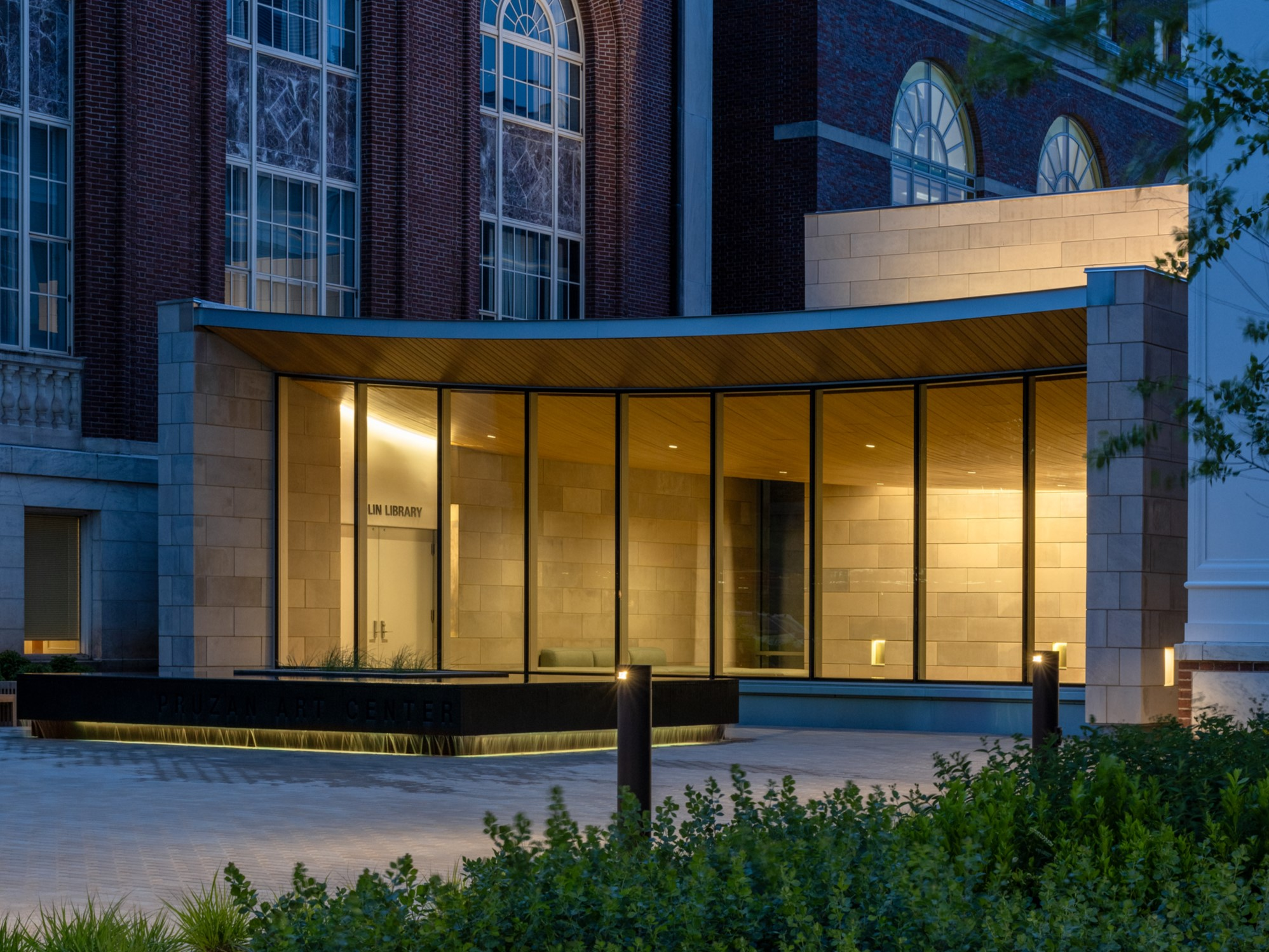
Pruzan Art Center

The Davison Art Collection exhibits in the Anne Goldrach Gallery, located in the Pruzan Art Center. The Pruzan Art Center was designed by Peterson Rich Office and opened in 2024. The collection's educational program includes student-curated exhibitions and a study room to support object-based teaching and learning.

== Student life ==
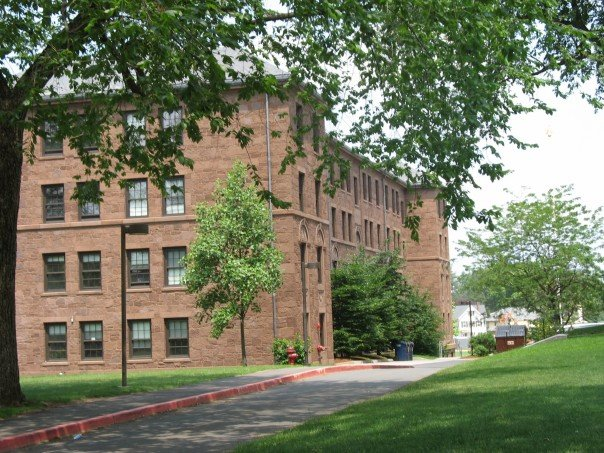
Clark Hall, a freshman dormitory built in 1916 and renovated in 2002

=== Cannon Scrap ===
In the late 1860s, a yearly contest, the "Cannon Scrap," began between the freshmen, whose mission it was to fire the Douglas Cannon on February 22, and the sophomores, who were charged with foiling the effort. In 1957, the tradition of stealing the cannon began in earnest.

=== Religious life ===
The institution employs a Jewish rabbi, a Protestant chaplain, and a Muslim chaplain. There is program housing for Buddhists, Muslims, Christians, and Jews.

Wesleyan Cardinals wordmark

=== Athletics ===
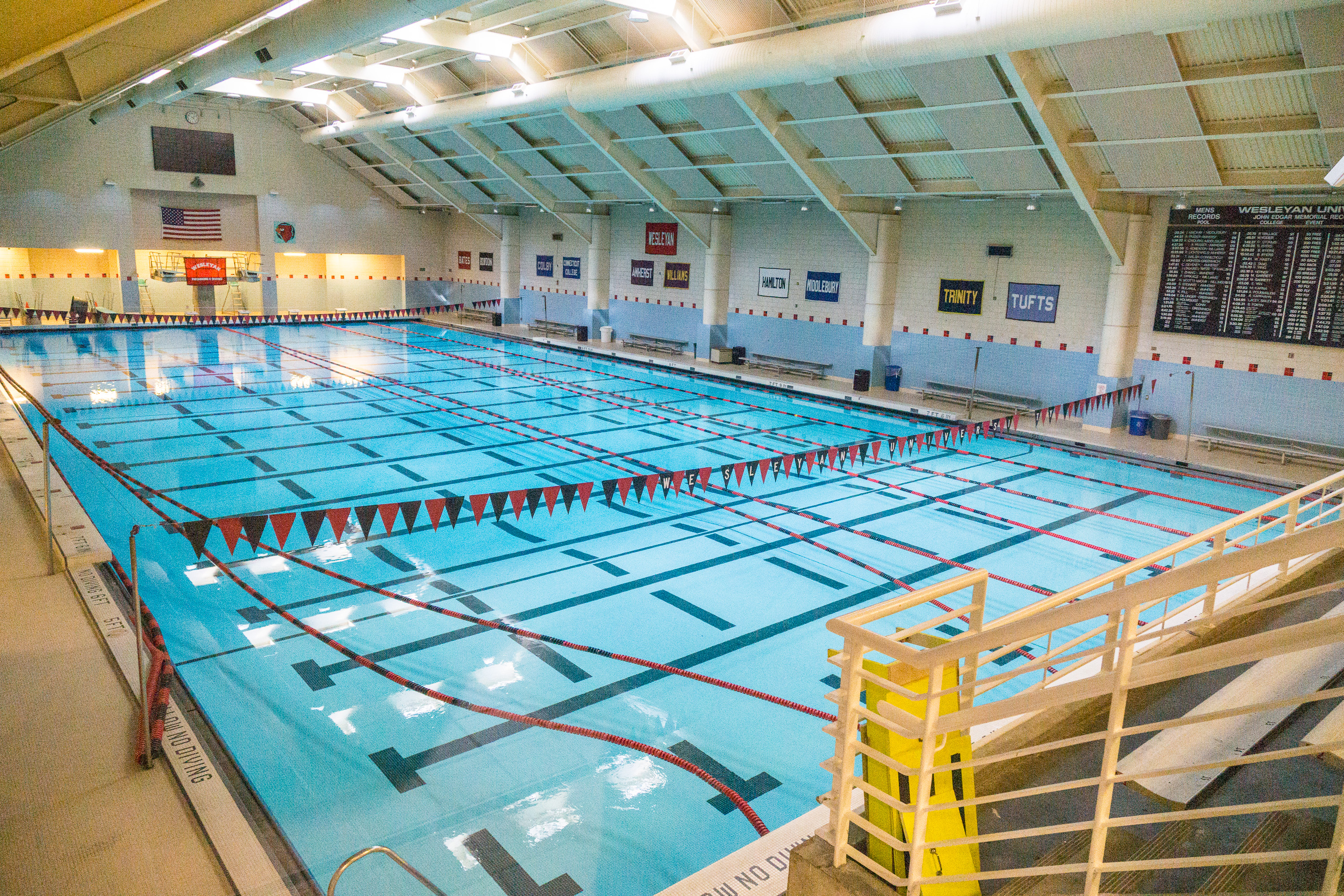
Wesleyan Natatorium

Wesleyan is a member of the New England Small College Athletic Conference (NESCAC) in the NCAA Division III, fielding intercollegiate varsity teams in 29 sports. It competes against traditional Little Three rivals Amherst and Williams. About 600 students participate in intercollegiate varsity sports each year. Wesleyan is one of the 39 founding members of the NCAA. Wesleyan's football and baseball field, Andrus Field, is the oldest continuously used American football field in the world and the oldest continuously used baseball field in the world.

With alumni including Bill Belichick, Eric Mangini, and Field Yates, the school has been described by ESPN as a "hotbed for great football minds." Led by coach John Raba, the winningest lacrosse coach in NESCAC history, the Wesleyan's Men's Lacrosse team won the NCAA Division III championship title in 2018—the school's first-ever national championship.

As a student, Amos Magee helped lead Wesleyan University to an ECAC soccer championship and school-best record of 15–1–1 in 1991; 35 goals and 85 points, he remains the Cardinals' all-time leading scorer. He was a National Soccer Coaches Association of America (NSCAA) Division III All-American in 1992, four times was named all-New England, and was inducted into the Wesleyan University Hall of Fame.

=== Student groups and organizations ===
==== Wesleyan Student Assembly ====
The Wesleyan Student Assembly (WSA) is a body of 38 students elected annually to represent Wesleyan University's undergraduate student body. The members of the assembly serve as student advocates in all areas of the institution, including matters related to student life, academics, university finances, and campus facilities.

==== Debate ====
The Debate Society was founded in 1903 and later named in honor of Woodrow Wilson, who had been a professor at Wesleyan between 1888 and 1890 and who "became deeply involved in extracurricular student activities such as the [Wesleyan] debate society." He "stimulated students to organize opportunity for debate through a House of Commons similar to the one he had started at Johns Hopkins in 1884."

==== Environmental ====
Another student group is the Environmental Organizers' Network (EON), which campaigns on environmental issues. Wesleyan also owns a tract of land that is used as Long Lane Farm, a 2-acre (8,100 m^{2}) organic vegetable farm run by students.

==== Publications ====
Some of the oldest and most visible student groups are campus publications, including a bi-weekly newspaper, The Wesleyan Argus and a periodical, Hermes, the institution's oldest student-run publication. Until 2008, the student body published the Olla Podrida which was originally a quarterly newspaper in the late 1850s, but was the college yearbook since the Civil War. The Argus is the campus newspaper. Wesleying is a student-run weblog that documents undergraduate life at Wesleyan, often receiving up to 10,000 page views a day.

==== Singing groups ====
Wesleyan was long known as the "Singing College of New England." The institution's "tradition as a 'singing college' had its roots in the vitality of Methodist hymnody." In 1862, a university glee club made the first tour of Wesleyan singers. The Wesleyan glee club organized by students frequently traveled and performed from the mid-19th century through the mid-20th century and was considered among the best collegiate glee clubs in the late 19th century. It traveled widely giving concerts, including being received twice at the White House (in 1901 by President McKinley and again in 1928 by President Coolidge) and being recorded onto a phonograph record by Thomas Edison. University alumni published the first edition of The Wesleyan Song Book in 1901. Subsequently, the Glee Club twice won the National Intercollegiate Glee Club Competition at Carnegie Hall. Since the Glee Club's disbanding, the tradition of choral singing has been carried on by the Wesleyan Singers, later renamed the Wesleyan Concert Choir, and then renamed again The Wesleyan Ensemble Singers (2010). This tradition also continues today in several student-run a cappella groups on campus, including the Wesleyan Spirits, the institution's oldest group. There are at least 13 groups that perform on campus regularly, with others occasionally created and disbanded, including Triple Major, Notably Sharp, The Cardinal Sinners, The Mazeltones, The Mixolydians, and numerous others.

=== Greek organizations and secretive societies ===
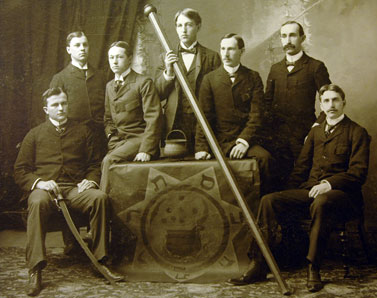
Original Mystical Seven

Wesleyan has chapters of Alpha Delta Phi, Alpha Psi Alpha, Chi Psi, Psi Upsilon, and Delta Kappa Epsilon (DKE). However, the only organizations that are active and have society houses on campus (as of 2024) are ADP, Psi U, and The Eclectic Society.

In September 2014, Wesleyan ordered all fraternities with on-campus housing to become co-educational within the next three years. In 2015, Wesleyan University ordered the closure of the DKE fraternity house on High Street. In 2017, DKE won the claim against Wesleyan University in a court trial. The jury awarded damages of $386,000 to the Kent Literary Club, DKE's Wesleyan alumni chapter.

Secretive societies on campus include the Skull & Serpent, Theta Nu Epsilon, Cloak, The Cannon Society, Pigs of Patio, and two Mystical Sevens.

=== International students ===
Around 10 percent of the student body holds citizenship other than that of the United States. Wesleyan offers financial aid for students from all countries.

== Literary, media, and cultural references ==
More than 30 books have been published concerning the institution, including: The Wesleyan Song Book, by Karl P. Harrington and Carl F. Price (1901); The Goose-Step: A Study of American Education, by Upton Sinclair (1923); Wesleyan's First Century With an Account of the Centennial Celebration, by Carl F. Price (1932); Wesleyan University, 1831–1910: Collegiate Enterprise in New England, by David B. Potts (1999); The Gatekeepers: Inside The Admissions Process of a Premier College, by Jacques Steinberg (2002); One Hundred Semesters: My Adventures as Student, Professor, and University President, and What I Learned along the Way, by William M. Chace (14th president of Wesleyan) (2006); A History of the Eclectic Society of Phi Nu Theta, 1837–1970, by William B.B. Moody (2007); Hidden Ivies: Thirty Colleges of Excellence, by Howard Greene and Matthew Greene (2000); Hidden Ivies: 50 Top Colleges that Rival the Ivy League, by Howard Greene and Matthew Greene (2009); Music at Wesleyan: From Glee Club to Gamelan by Mark Slobin (2010).

John Maher's 1995 work Thinker, Sailer, Brother, Spy: A Novel features a fictional look at the life of a professor (a principal character) in the "hothouse atmosphere of Wesleyan University...." Two of Robert Ludlum's novels are set partially at Wesleyan, The Matlock Paper much of the action takes place in and around the campus of a thinly disguised Wesleyan, and also The Chancellor Manuscript where Ludlum refers to Wesleyan as 'a wealthy but minor university'.

The 1963 comedic novel, Night and Silence Who is Here?, by novelist Pamela Hansford Johnson, is thought by many literary critics to be patterned humorously after Wesleyan's Institute for Advanced Studies (now the Center for the Humanities); the main characters comprise and parallel the cast of Shakespeare's Midsummer Night's Dream. The Eclectic Society, a play that premiered on January 27, 2010, at the Walnut Street Theatre is based upon the Eclectic Society at the institution during the early 1960s. In the 2012 novel Dream School, by novelist Blake Nelson, the protagonist attends an eastern liberal arts college, Wellington College, modeled on Wesleyan.

The 1994 cult comedy film PCU was based on (and filmed in part at) Wesleyan, the alma mater of the screenplay's two writers, Adam Leff and Zak Penn, and represents "an exaggerated view of contemporary college life...." centering on a fictionalized version of the Eclectic Society, known in the film as "The Pit."

In the autumn of 2010, the Pulitzer prize-winning comic strip Doonesbury by Garry Trudeau featured the institution in a series of daily strips.

In 2015, Rolling Stone published a long form feature on Wesleyan's drug culture titled "Inside the Wesleyan Molly Bust", where dozens of students overdosed on tainted ecstasy, leading to the expulsion of five students.

== Notable alumni and faculty ==
Wesleyan alumni have received external fellowships, including Fulbright, Goldwater, Marshall, Rhodes, Truman, and Watson. For the years 2007 through 2011, a total of 42 Wesleyan students and alumni received scholarships under the Fulbright program. The institution has had at least 87 Watson Fellows since the inception of the program in 1968.

Former Wesleyan faculty and affiliates V. S. Naipaul, Woodrow Wilson, and T. S. Eliot have been awarded Nobel Prizes. Satoshi Omura, Max Tishler Professor of Chemistry, was awarded the 2015 Nobel Prize in Physiology or Medicine. Former faculty and affiliates Richard Wilbur, Mark Strand, and Donald Hall were United States Poets Laureate. Composers John Cage and Steve Lehman were both affiliated with the institution. Musician Anthony Braxton taught at Wesleyan for over 20 years and chaired its music department.

Notable alumni in science and academia include Edward Thorndike, a pioneer of educational psychology and the law of effect; Wilbur Olin Atwater, a pioneer of nutritional science whose research contributed to the measurement of food energy; Leslie Greengard, co-developer of the fast multipole method, recognized as one of the ten most significant algorithms of the 20th century; and Charles Alton Ellis, the structural engineer chiefly responsible for the design of the Golden Gate Bridge.

Business and technology alumni include Herb Kelleher, co-founder and former CEO of Southwest Airlines; Walter B. Wriston, former chairman and CEO of Citicorp; Strauss Zelnick, chairman and CEO of Take-Two Interactive and former CEO of BMG Entertainment; Robert Allbritton, founder of Politico; and Christopher Weaver, founder of Bethesda Softworks. Alumni in politics and government include David Josiah Brewer, an associate justice of the Supreme Court of the United States; Michael Bennet and John Hickenlooper, U.S. senators from Colorado; Lael Brainard, former Vice Chair of the Federal Reserve and director of the National Economic Council; and Scott Gottlieb, former commissioner of the Food and Drug Administration.

Literary alumni include Robert Ludlum, bestselling author of the Bourne novels; Daniel Handler, known by the pen name Lemony Snicket and author of A Series of Unfortunate Events; Robin Cook, known for his medical thrillers; and Charles Olson, a major figure in postwar American poetry. Television and film alumni include Joss Whedon, creator of Buffy the Vampire Slayer and director of The Avengers; Lin-Manuel Miranda, Pulitzer Prize and Tony Award-winning creator of Hamilton; Michael Bay, director of the Transformers films; Mike White, creator of The White Lotus; D. B. Weiss, co-creator of Game of Thrones; Matthew Weiner, creator of Mad Men; and Akiva Goldsman, Academy Award-winning screenwriter of A Beautiful Mind. Writers Craig Thomas and Carter Bays co-created How I Met Your Mother. Musical alumni include Grammy-nominated jazz singer Tierney Sutton, singer-songwriter Amanda Palmer, and musician Santigold. Founding members of the band MGMT met and formed the group while attending Wesleyan.

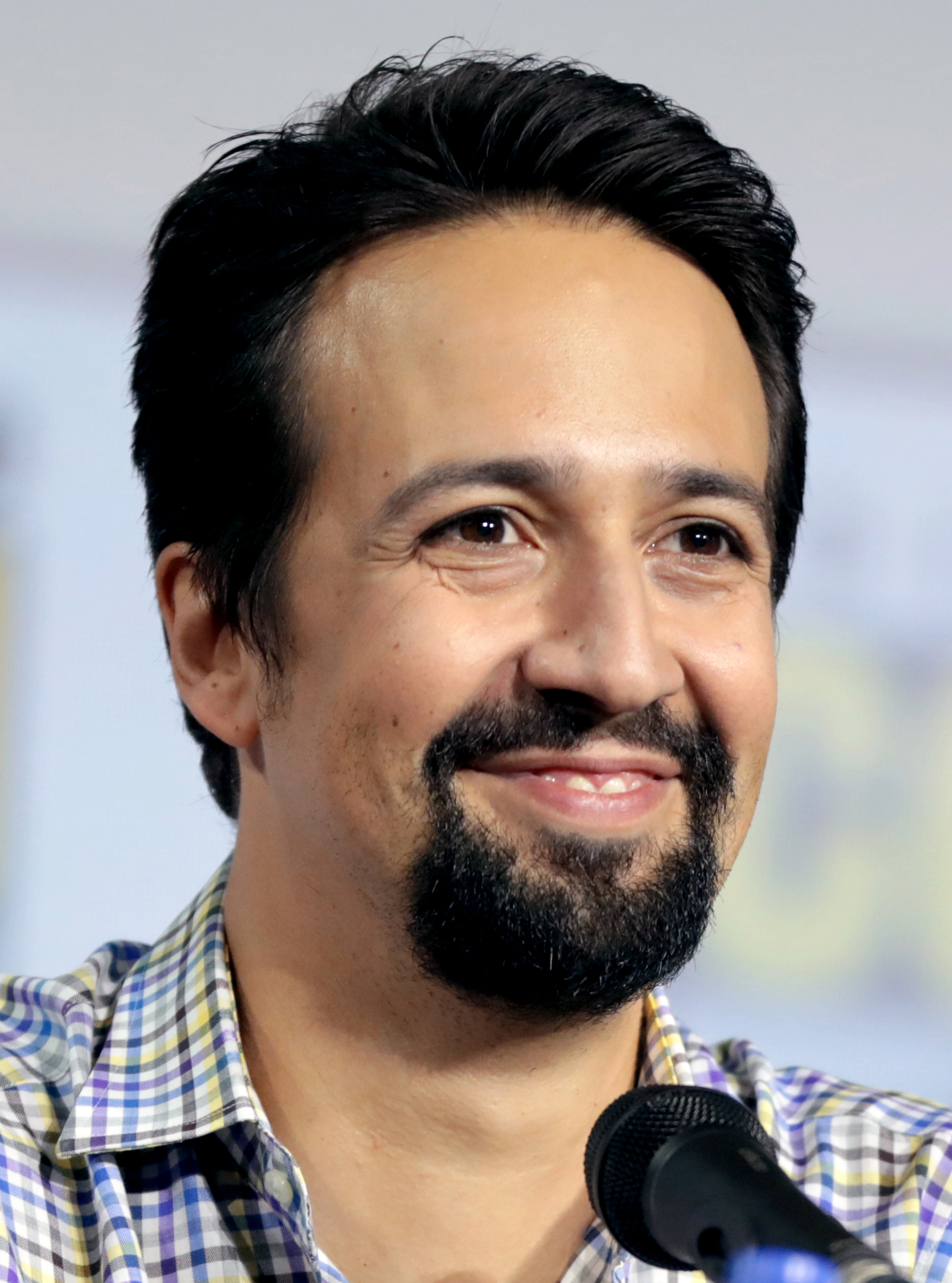
Lin-Manuel Miranda, Pulitzer Prize and Tony Award-winning creator of Hamilton

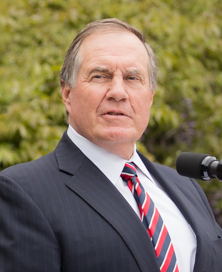
Bill Belichick, six-time Super Bowl-winning head coach of the New England Patriots

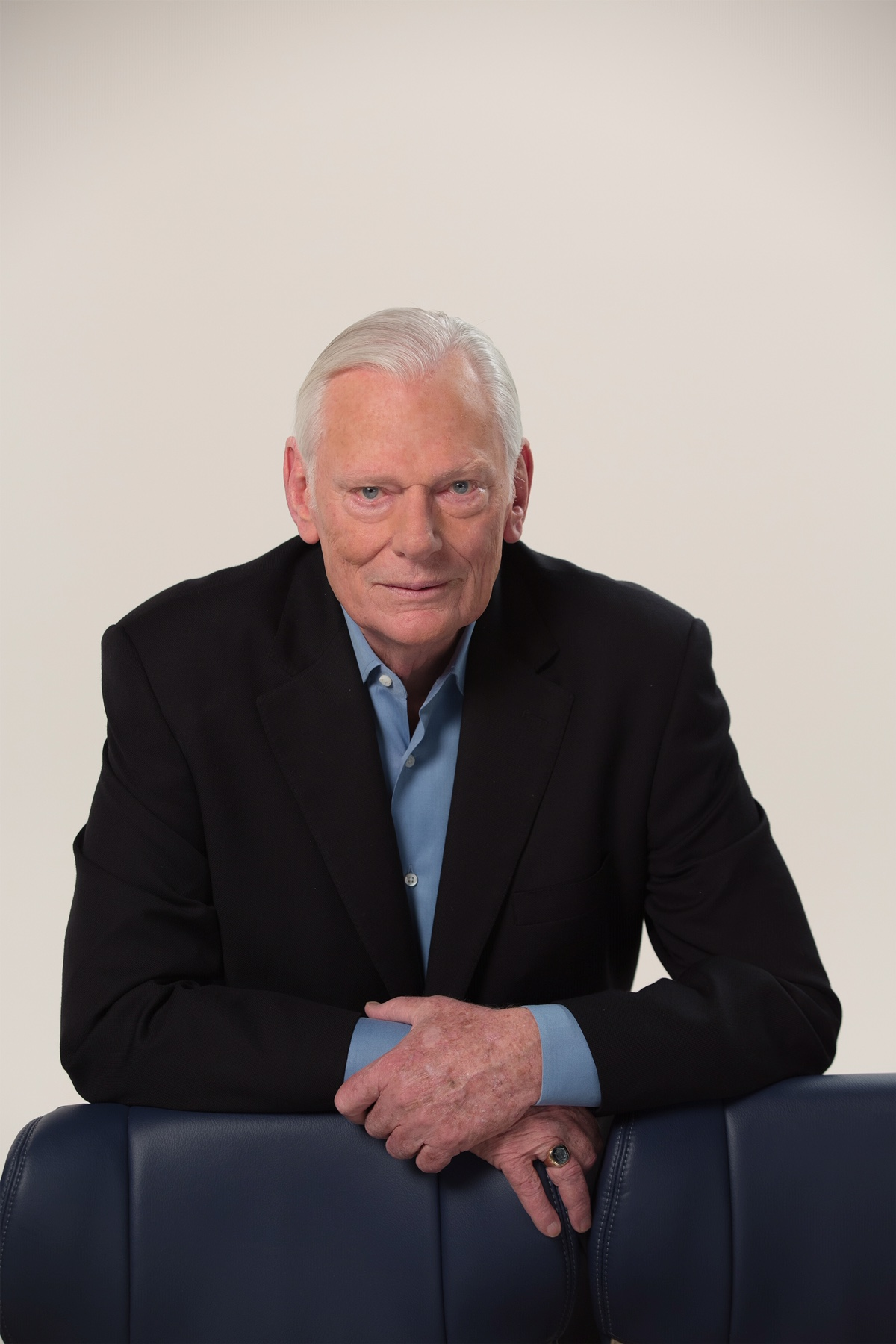
Herb Kelleher, co-founder and former CEO of Southwest Airlines

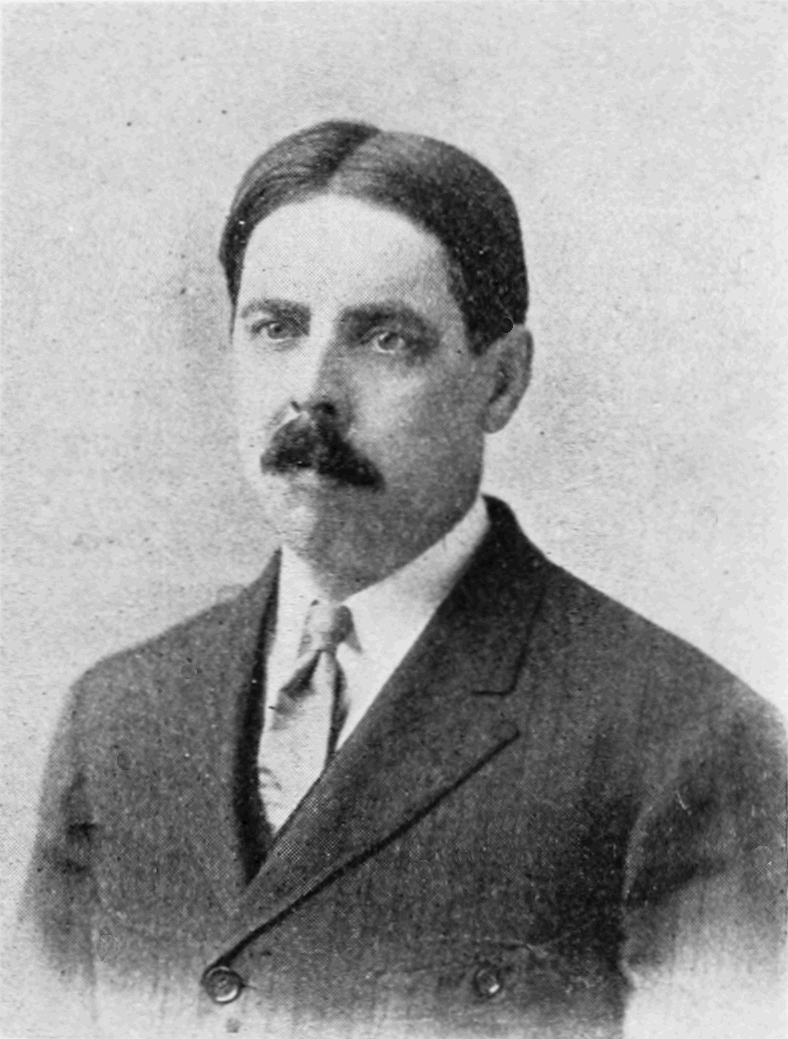
Edward Thorndike, pioneering psychologist known for the law of effect

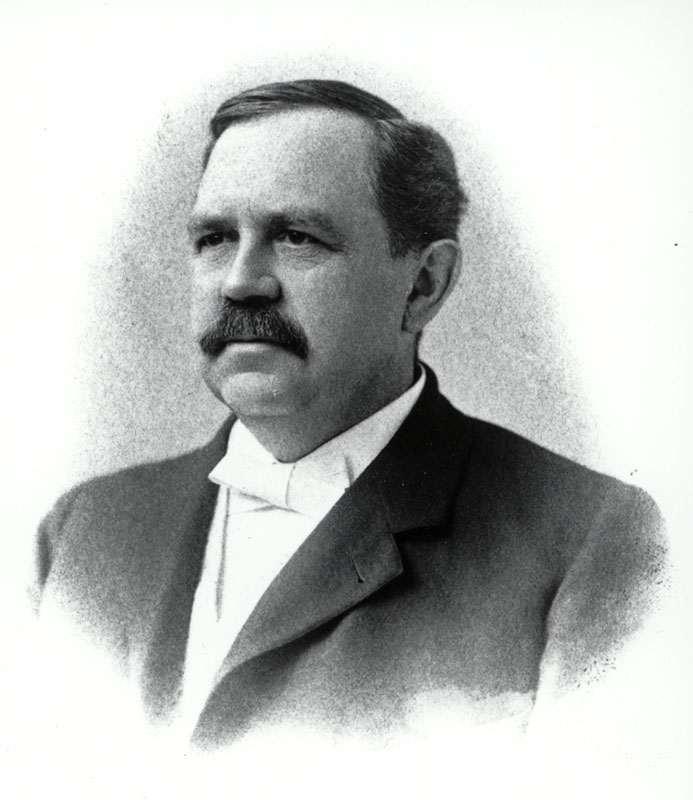
Wilbur Olin Atwater, pioneer of nutritional science and the measurement of food energy

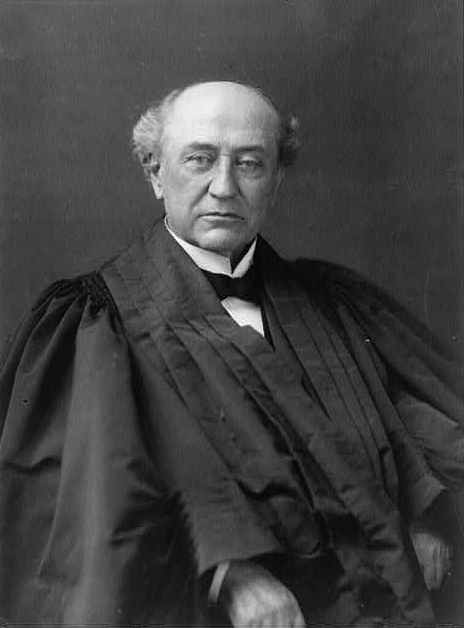
David Josiah Brewer, former associate justice of the Supreme Court of the United States

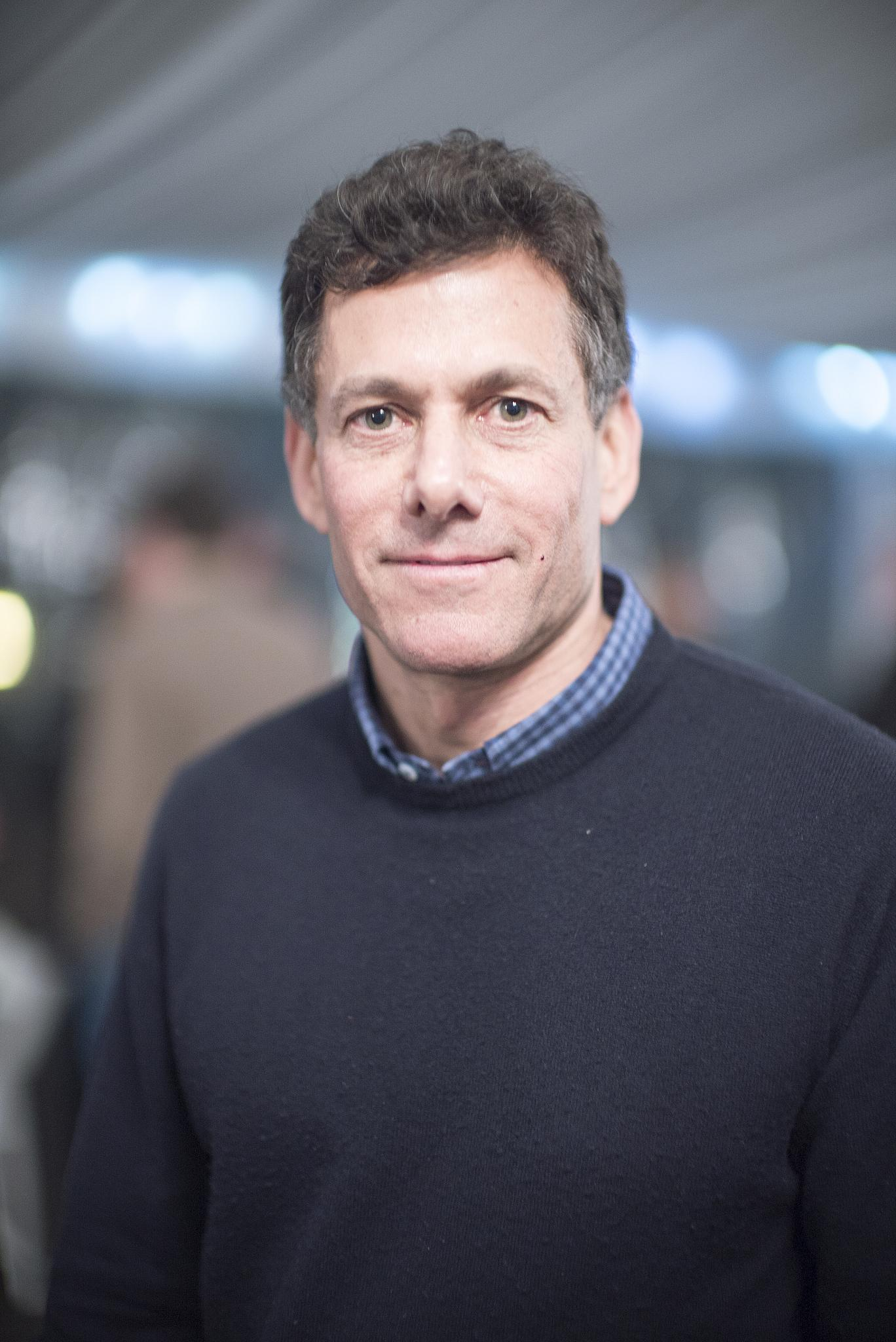
Strauss Zelnick, chairman and CEO of Take-Two Interactive, publisher of the Grand Theft Auto series

Robert Allbritton, founder and former publisher of Politico

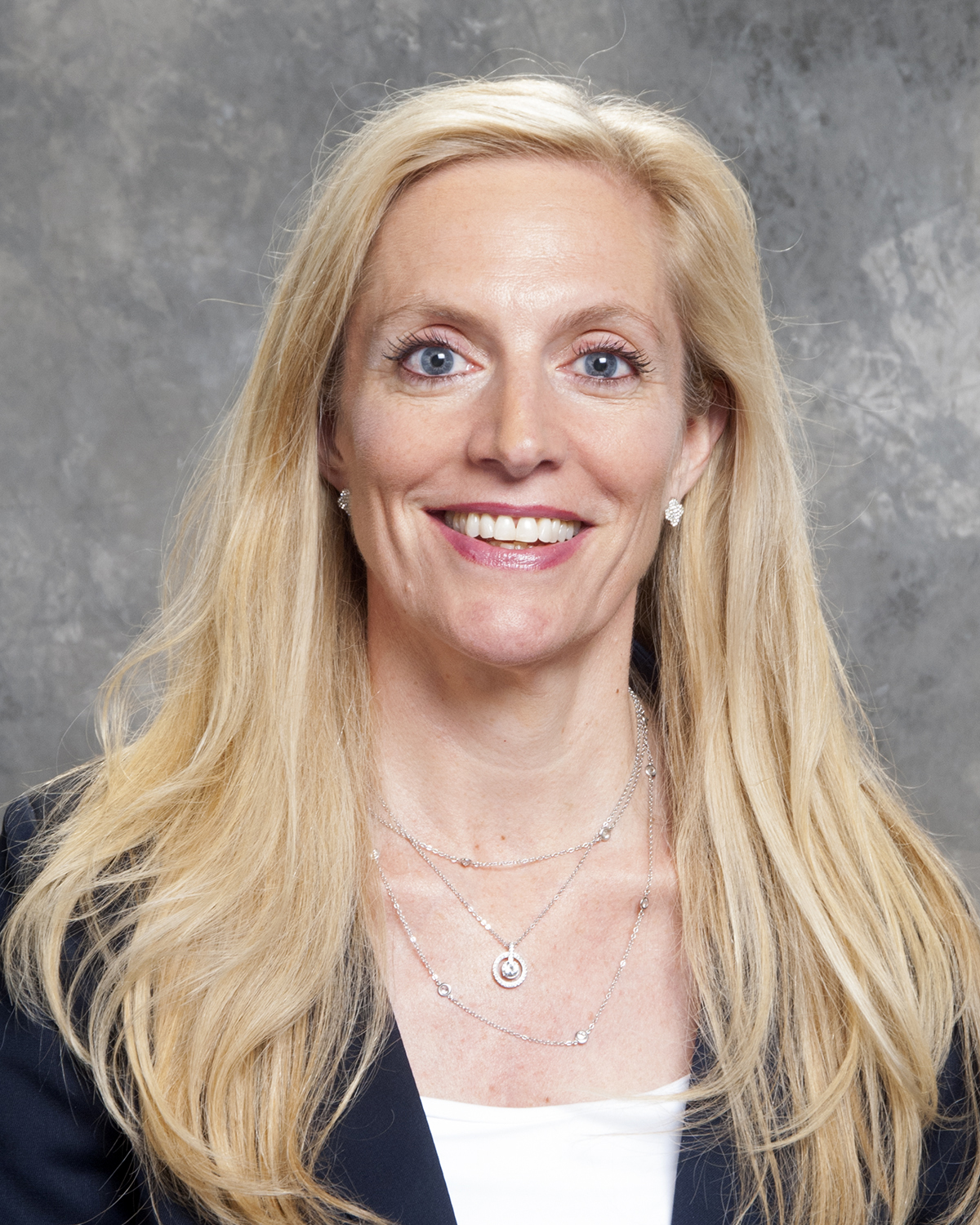
Lael Brainard, former Vice Chair of the Federal Reserve and director of the National Economic Council

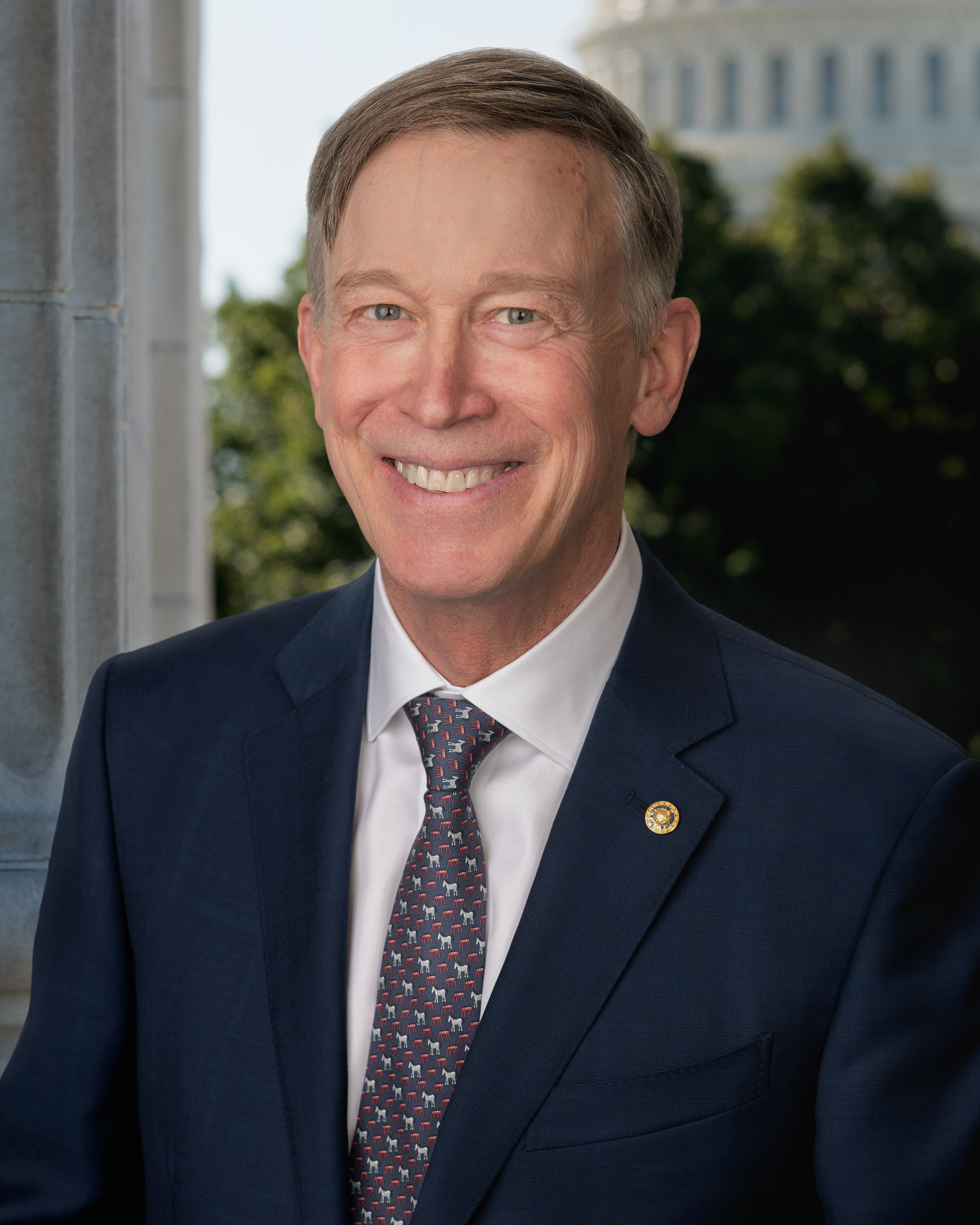
John Hickenlooper, U.S. senator from Colorado and former Governor of Colorado

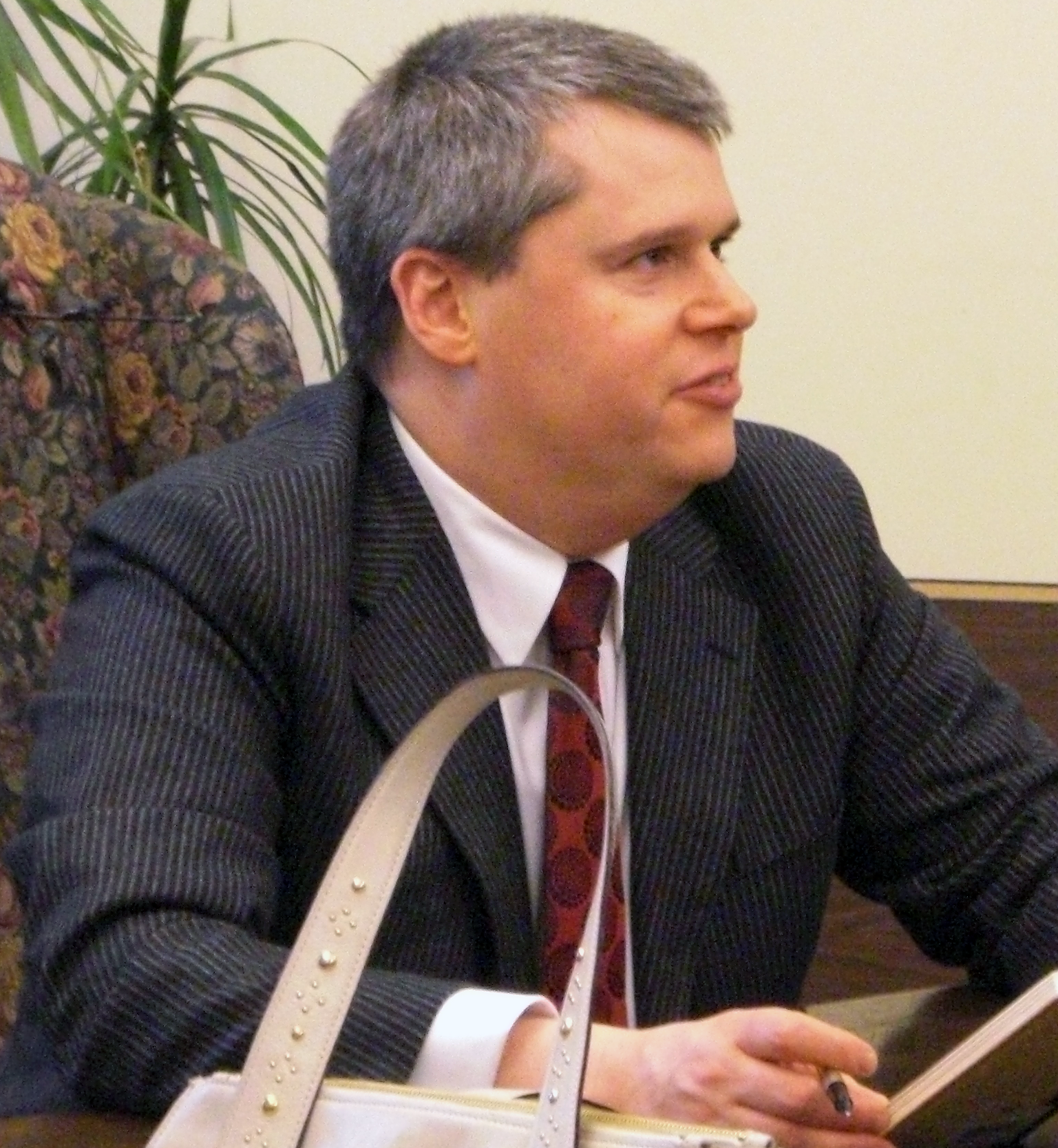
Daniel Handler, author known by the pen name Lemony Snicket, creator of A Series of Unfortunate Events

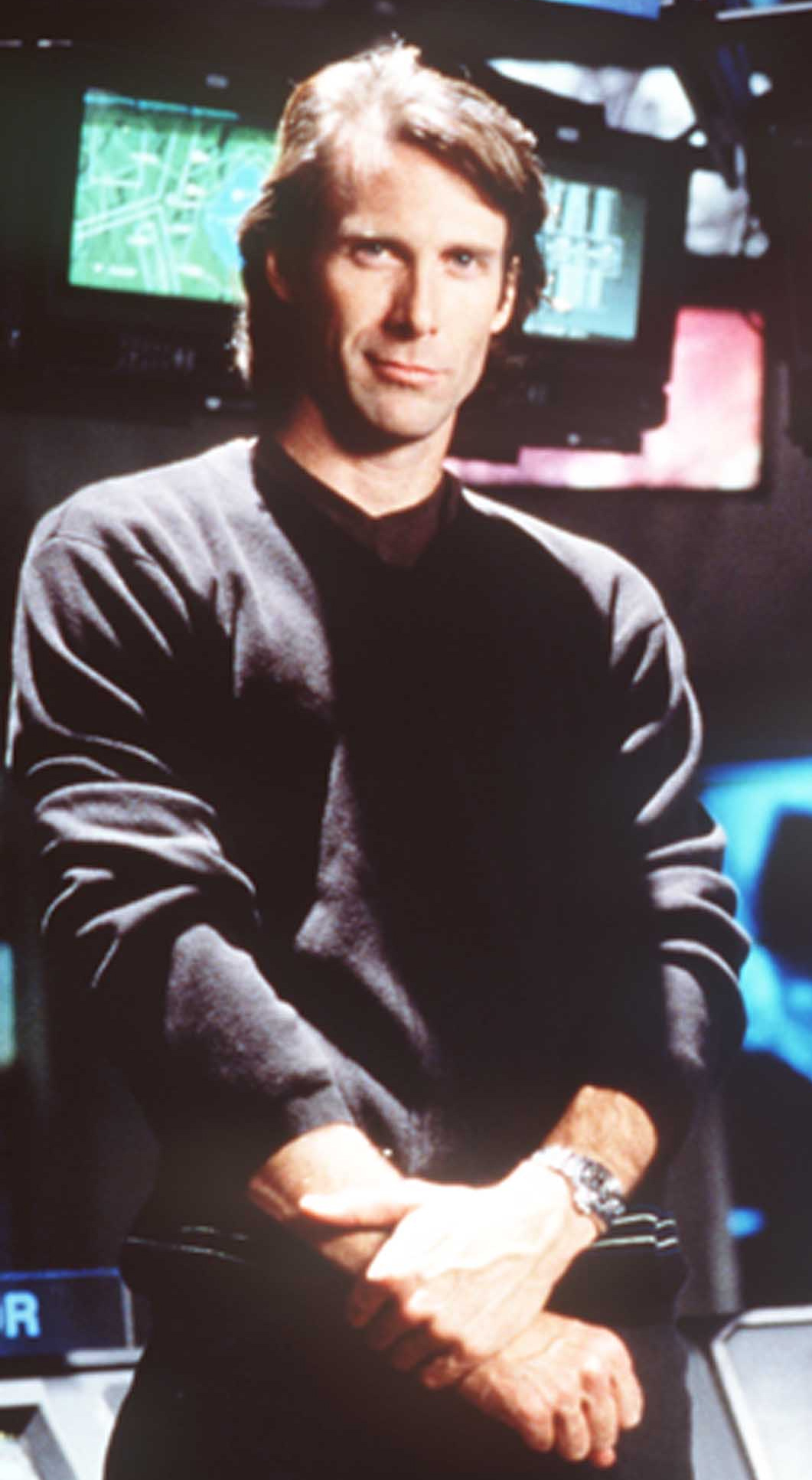
Michael Bay, director of Armageddon and the Transformers film series

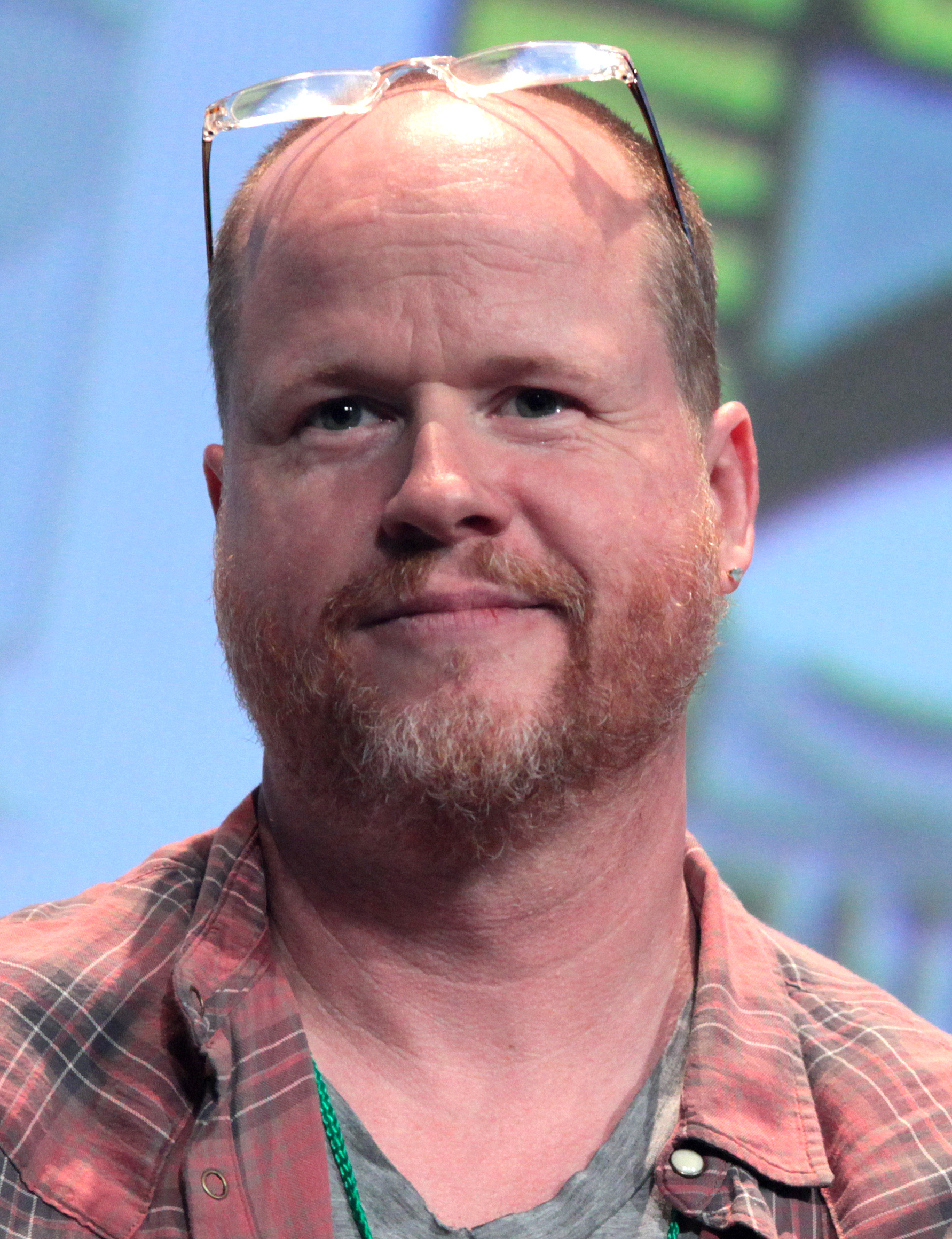
Joss Whedon, creator of Buffy the Vampire Slayer and Firefly, and director of The Avengers

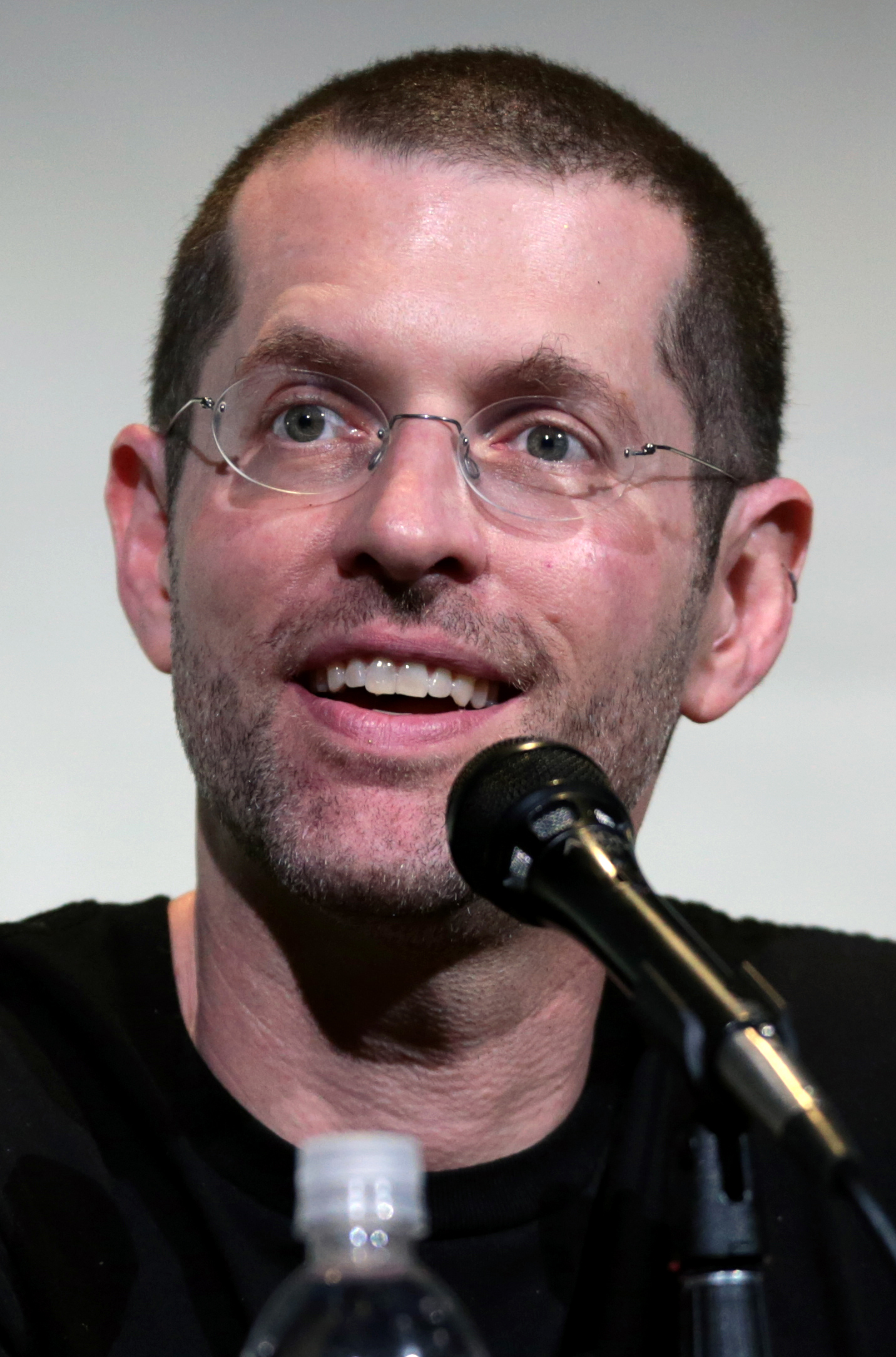
D. B. Weiss, co-creator and showrunner of Game of Thrones

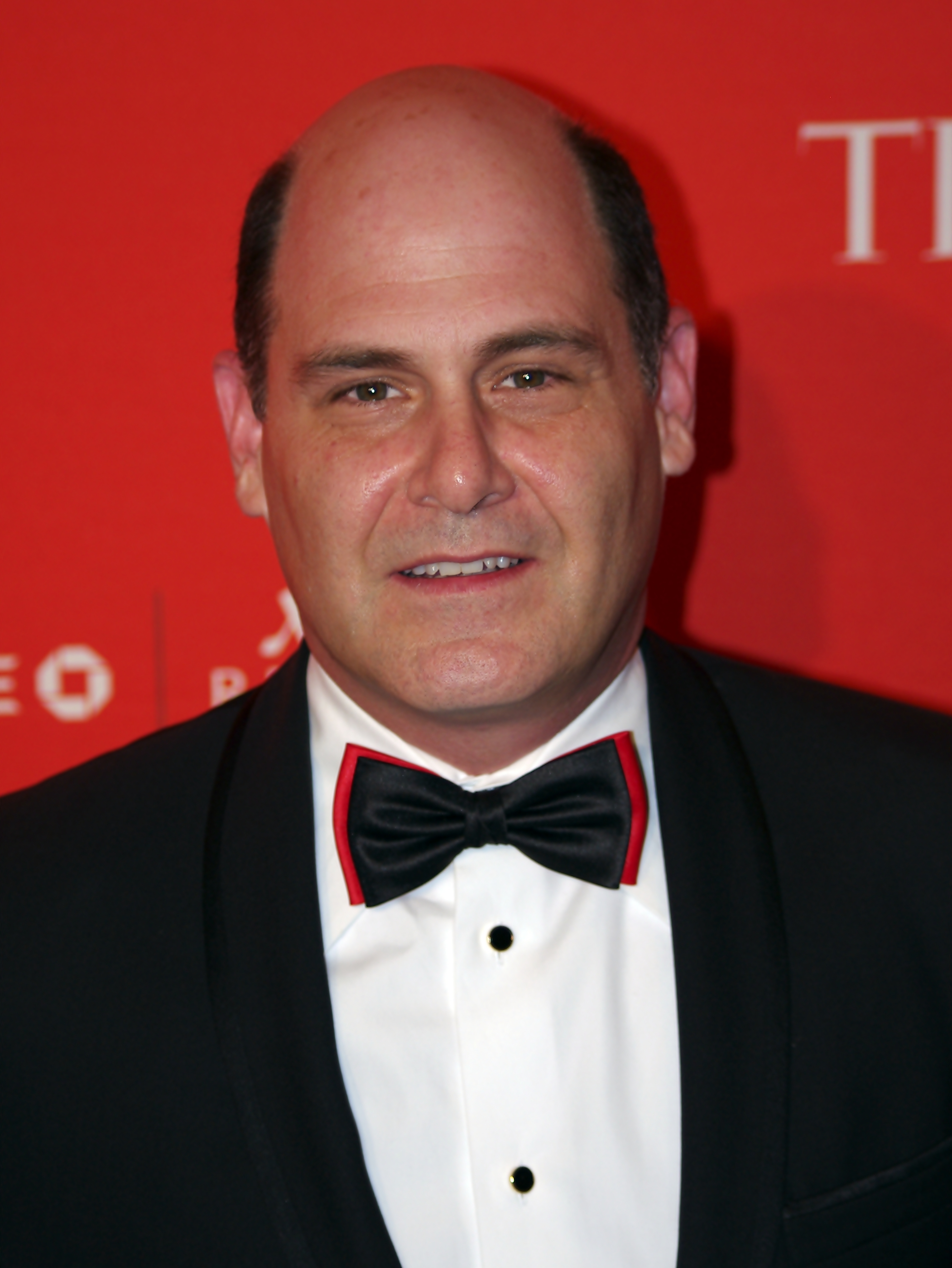
Matthew Weiner, creator of Mad Men and writer for The Sopranos

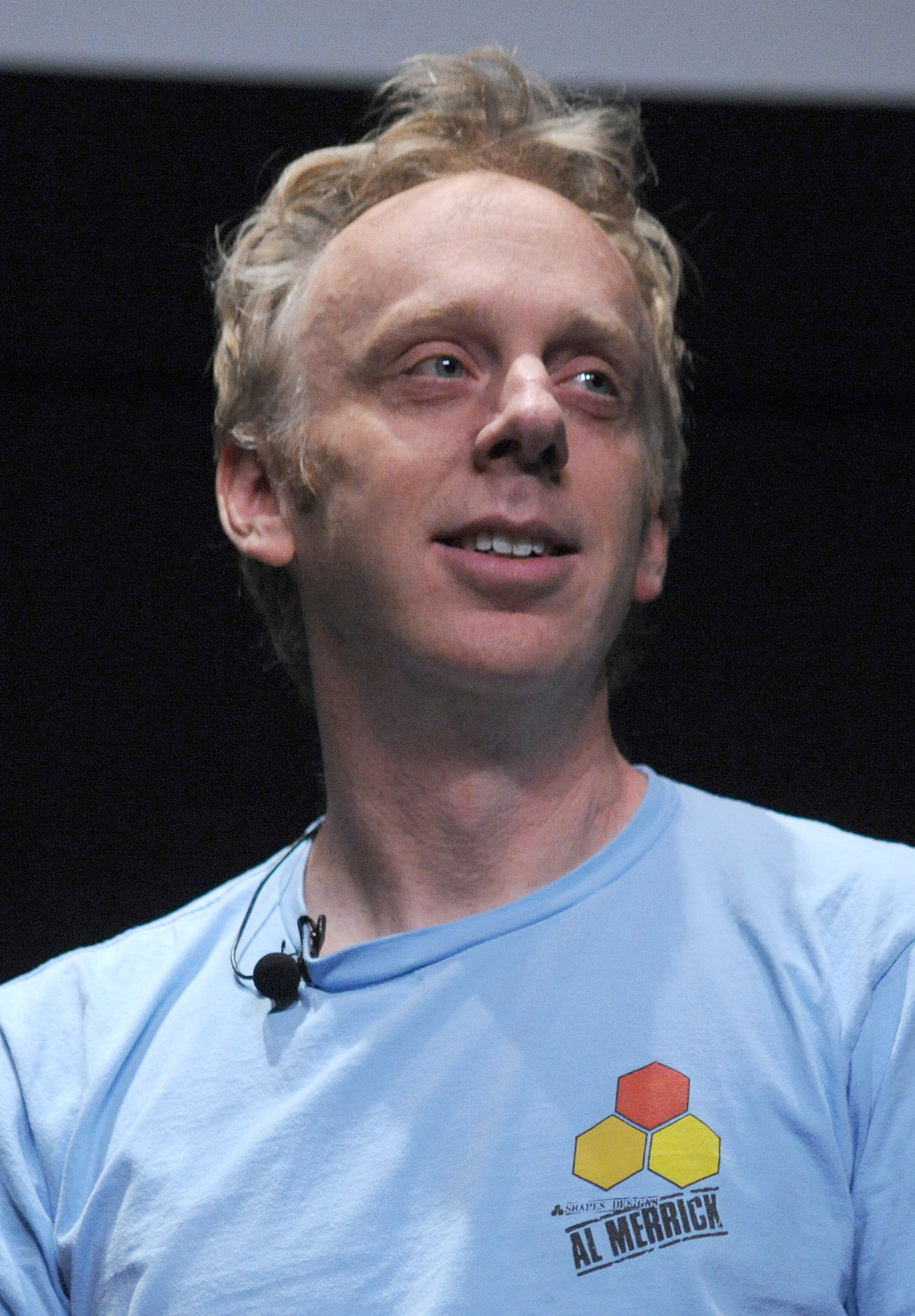
Mike White, filmmaker and creator of The White Lotus

== See also ==
- Wesleyan University Press
