= Doug Lederman =

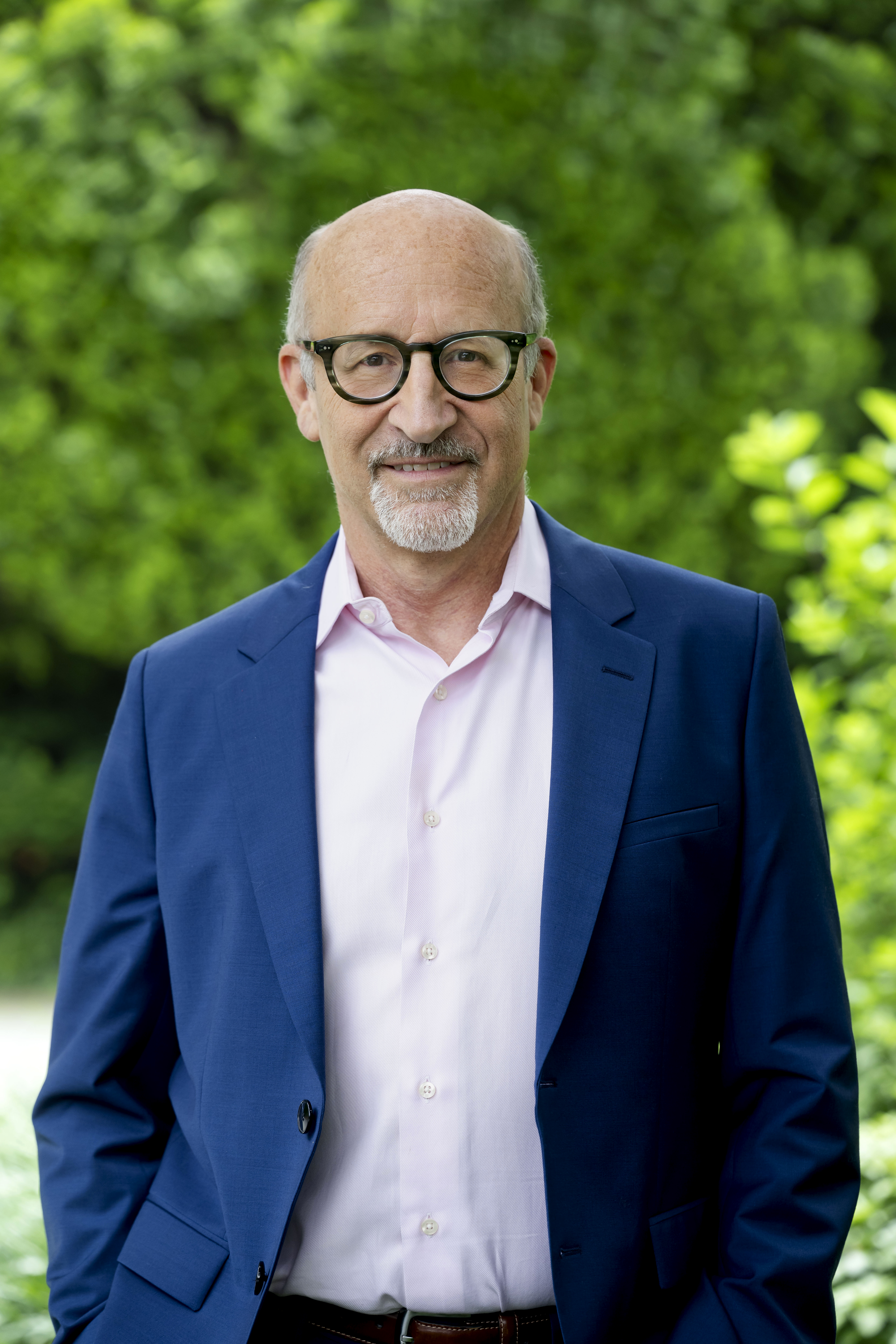
- Doug Lederman in 2025
- Born: Shaker Heights, Ohio, U.S.
- Education: Princeton University
- Occupations: Journalist, editor, analyst
- Known for: Co-founding Inside Higher Ed
- Spouse: Kate Scharff
- Awards: National Award for Education Reporting (×3); Education Writers Association; James L. Fisher Award (2025)

Doug Lederman is an American journalist, editor and analyst, best known as co-founder and editor of the online publication Inside Higher Ed. Lederman has won multiple National Awards for Education reporting from the Education Writers Association. He speaks widely on issues related to higher education, and is a frequent commentator on higher education in media outlets including The New York Times, USA Today, NPR, and C-SPAN.

== Early life ==
Lederman grew up in Shaker Heights, Ohio, the son of Dr. Richard J. Lederman, a neurologist at the Cleveland Clinic, and Barbara Wilson Lederman. He attended Princeton University, graduating in 1984 with a bachelor’s degree in sociology. While at Princeton, he wrote for The Daily Princetonian, an experience that helped set the stage for his career in journalism.

== Career ==
After graduating from Princeton in 1984, Lederman began his journalism career at The New York Times as a news clerk and reporting assistant. In 1986, Lederman joined The Chronicle of Higher Education, a Washington-based publication covering colleges and universities. Over the course of nearly two decades at the newspaper, he worked as a reporter, covering areas such as athletics and legal issues in higher education, before moving into editorial positions. He was appointed managing editor in 1999, a role in which he supervised the newsroom's daily operations, coordinated coverage of national issues in postsecondary education, and oversaw a staff of reporters and editors. He remained at The Chronicle until 2003.

In 2004, Lederman co-founded Inside Higher Ed with Scott Jaschik and Kathleen Collins. He served as editor and helped oversee the site's news, opinion, and career content. In October 2024, Lederman announced that he would step down from his editorial role after nearly twenty years at the publication.

=== Media work ===
Lederman has been a host of "The Key with Inside Higher Ed," a podcast on issues in higher education. He also speaks on topics related to higher education and has appeared as a commentator in media outlets including The New York Times, The Washington Post, USA Today, NPR, PBS NewsHour, and C-SPAN.

== Awards and recognition ==
Lederman has received three National Awards for Education Reporting from the Education Writers Association. In 2009, he shared an award for a series of articles on college rankings published in Inside Higher Ed.

In 2025, Lederman and Jaschik received The James L. Fisher Award (which "highlights individuals whose influence on education extends beyond a single institution") from the Council for Advancement and Support of Education (CASE).

== Personal life ==
Lederman lives in Bethesda, Maryland, with his wife, Kate Scharff.
