= Douglas cannon =

Brass cannon owned by Wesleyan University

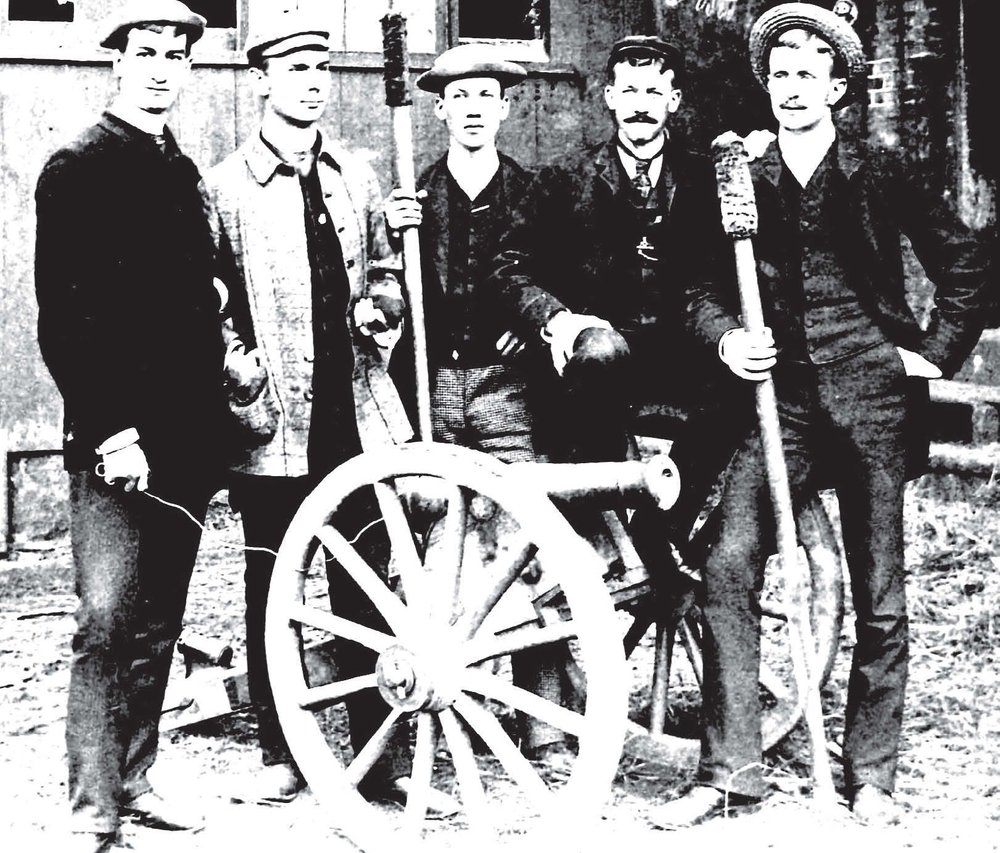
Douglas cannon in 1860s

The Douglas cannon is a missing cannon properly owned by Wesleyan University of Connecticut which was originally notable for being used in annual "cannon scraps" (contests to attempt to fire or prevent the firing of the cannon), but which in later years became known for being repeatedly stolen. The cannon, made of brass, weighs 140 pounds (64 kg) and is 29 1/2 inches (750 mm) long and 5 1/4 inches (130 mm) in diameter. It was originally mounted on a wooden carriage, but in 1931 it was mounted on a stone pedestal.

== Nineteenth century ==
During the middle of the nineteenth century at Wesleyan, cannons were fired to celebrate the Fourth of July holiday. In 1859, the school calendar was changed such that school was not in session during the Fourth of July holiday.

Prior to its acquisition by the college, the campus was occupied by Captain Partridge's American Literary, Scientific and Military Academy. As a result, several old cannons were partly buried in the ground as posts. In order to celebrate George Washington's birthday, one of these was dug up, cleaned, and fired in the early morning hours by some freshman students.

The early morning cannon fire was repeated in 1858, much to college president Joseph Cummings' annoyance. By 1860, though, an annual tradition was established in which members of the freshman class (first year students) would attempt to fire a cannon on the morning of February 22, while members of the sophomore class tried to prevent this from happening. These contests were known as "cannon scraps".

1860 was also the first year that the Douglas cannon was used in the scrap. The Douglas battery was an artillery regiment named for Middletown mayor Benjamin Douglas. A new cannon was borrowed, presumably by the freshman, for the scrap. In 1869, a cannon fired with too much powder and destroyed the library windows, and from them until 1893, cannon scraps were generally held off-campus.

Some insight into the scraps of this era is given by an article in an 1878 edition of the school newspaper, The College Argus. Apparently, members of the freshman class would attempt to locate one or more cannon and acquire some powder and ammunition, often buying or renting them from nearby Meriden, Portland, or New Britain. Sophomores would attempt to prevent this by means ranging from renting the cannon before the freshman could, to stealing the cannon or powder or ammunition, sometimes via straightforward physical violence. Freshmen were often followed by sophomores if it seemed that they might be going in search of a cannon. By the mid-1870s, students would engage in underhanded and manipulative tactics during the scrap- trickery, hiring other students, hiring Middletown residents, and bribing school officials.

In the 1876 scrap, once acquired, one cannon was guarded by farmers with shotguns and axes. On the 20th of February, a group of juniors attempted to sneak the cannon out, working for the sophomores and claiming to be freshmen. They managed to take possession of the ammunition, but as they were trying to persuade the farmer to leave the cannon when they were recognized as juniors and chased off. The freshmen obtained another cannon from Portland. Late in the night, there were fights between the sophomores and freshmen in Indian Hill Cemetery and on Foss Hill, where one was successfully fired and the other disabled. The cannon was soon after taken by the sophomores and sunken in the Connecticut River. Under threat of lawsuit by the cannon's owner, the sophomores later hired a diver to retrieve the cannon, and several members of the cannon scrap were suspended. This led to some student controversy under President Cyrus David Foss.

Around 1900, the Douglas Pump Works officially donated the cannon to the university.

=== Final scraps, 1893 to 1916 ===
Starting in 1893, the scraps were held on campus, and a set of rules was imposed, basically making the scrap into a contest that revolved around hiding the cannon and then sneaking it into position on the morning of the 22nd. Once in position, the sophomores had lost and had to allow the firing to take place.

Getting the cannon into position was a matter both of stealth and of force; the sophomores would attempt to steal the cannon while the freshman hid it, sometimes for months. If sighted on the way to firing position, mobs of sophomores would swarm the cannon team and attempt to physically overwhelm them. Elaborate preparations and tactics were employed, including multiple decoy cannon and kidnappings.

In 1905, the sophomores erected a large barricade of snow and wire. The freshman set off a false fire alarm, and used the confusion caused by the arrival of the fire department to haul the cannon into the firing area. In order to win, the freshmen had to keep the cannon in the firing area for fifteen minutes; the sophomores rushed them and a melee ensued, but the freshmen were able to hold their position. Meanwhile, the fire department, annoyed at the false alarm and the melee, drenched the students with their fire hoses.

In 1916, a nearly unanimous vote ended the cannon scraps, though there was one revival in 1923.

== Monument ==
In 1931 during the college's centennial celebration, the new home of the cannon was revealed. The carriage had been removed (the wheels now serve as chandeliers in a university building) and the cannon filled with lead and mounted to a stone pedestal with a bronze plaque. It sat there for 26 years.

The Douglas Cannon
Born in Obscurity · Reared in Strife
Tempered by Travel · Never Discouraged
Home at Last

== Travels ==
In March, 1957, the modern tradition of stealing the cannon began. It was removed the night of March 12, hidden in Middletown, taken to New York and Iowa, and returned by masked figures in June 1958 during a reunion luncheon. It was remounted to its base over the summer.

A bit over a year later, in November 1959, it was stolen again. In March 1961, students in possession of the cannon presented it to Nikolai Bourov, head of the Soviet Union's delegation to the United Nations, claiming that they represented the student senate and that it was a gift to the students of the USSR, in order to symbolize "peace, brotherhood, and friendship". In April, the Dean of students, Mark Barlow, drove to New York, explained the situation to the diplomats, and recovered the cannon.

Students believing the cannon to be hidden in Barlow's basement broke in so many times during the next 20-odd months that Barlow later told the school paper "we had to leave flashlights around so that they wouldn't use matches and start a fire." In 1963, the cannon was remounted.

In May 1965, the cannon was stolen again, appearing in 1966 on campus and in 1967 at the office of the managing editor of Life Magazine in New York, and was returned to the university in time for that year's graduation. During its absence, letters supposedly authored by the cannon were received by the Argus.

In 1969, the cannon was again stolen from its pedestal and brought to the White House in Washington, DC. It was presented at the gates as a present to president Richard M. Nixon protesting the Vietnam War. Members of Connecticut's congressional delegation managed to arrange for the cannon's return to Wesleyan. Remounted in December 1970, it was soon stolen again.

== 1970s to present ==
The pattern of repeated thefts and brief appearances on campus, as well as the receipt of letters and postcards from the cannon, continued from the 1970s until the present time (2007). The letters from the cannon would sometimes include photographs of the cannon in remote locations, including Montreal, London, and Paris. It's unclear that the cannon was actually taken to those places, though the shipping case bearing the cannon in 1994 did have Venezuelan customs seals on it. There is suspicion of university complicity in these later appearances and disappearances of the cannon; certainly the November 2007 appearance indicates that the cannon is under university control.

The appearances often coincide with significant campus events, such as the 1973 reunion of the class of 1918, the final class to have won the classic cannon scraps. A member of the class wrote an open letter to the cannon in the Argus asking that it return for the reunion, and upon appearing it was serenaded by the alumni. It was stolen again in 1974, from the physics workshop where new mounts were being fitted.

It was mounted on the pedestal during the spring of 1975, and stolen again from its mountings. The mountings were partially sawn through over a period of several nights using a bare hack-saw blade. It was briefly taken to Mystical Seven house (by the burglar) for safe-keeping.

It appeared during the half-time parade of the college's homecoming football game soon after, but then went unseen for some time. In 1981, during the college's 150th anniversary celebrations, it was hidden in a large cake cut open by the college president's wife. It was stolen again in 1982, by burglars who broke a window and a lock in order to take possession.

It was returned during 1988's graduation exercises by people in masks. In 1989, it was reportedly mounted to a theft-proof base presented by an alum who was a retired CIA official, and stolen again 29 days later.

It appeared at 1994's reunion, and was displayed under guard in 1995 for the inauguration of a new university president. In 1998, an art class created an obelisk with a cannon on top and a letter asking for the cannon's return attached. Soon after, four masked men delivered the cannon to a member of the art class. The student claimed that despite the masks, she recognized three of the men, claiming they were the president and vice-president of the university and the acting dean of student affairs.

The art class took possession of the cannon, transporting it with the aid of a baby carriage. It was taken to a mall for a photograph with Santa Claus. Deciding to return the cannon to the student body as a whole, the cannon, inside a shipping crate placed in turn inside a plaster package wrapped with a ribbon tied in a bow, appeared on campus, and was immediately absconded with by students. In 2000, photos were received depicting the cannon in St Louis, Kansas, and at Las Vegas slot machines. It appeared on campus again during 2001, travelled to Appalachia, and settled briefly in Providence RI. It once made an early evening appearance at Yawgoog Scout Reservation.

The cannon reappeared briefly on campus on the eve of the commencement of the class of 2003. In the early hours of the morning, the cannon was stolen from the Eclectic Society and disappeared soon after.

Four years later in 2007, the cannon made yet another triumphant return to campus. At midnight, hours before President Douglas Bennet's final commencement, the cannon stormed the President's House. A joyous ceremony followed with tears and the spontaneous chanting of the Fight Song.

Later, in 2007, it was on display, under guard, for half an hour during an inauguration reception for the current President Michael Roth.

In May 2017, on the eve of graduation, the Douglas cannon reappeared for an hour at the Class of '62 reunion dinner.

On Halloween in 2018, the Vice President of Student Affairs emailed the student body an image he received of the Douglas cannon back on campus and surrounded by seven hooded individuals, presumably the Mystical Seven.

The Douglas cannon is not to be confused with an American Air Defense Artillery Army Officer of the same name.
