= David E. Scharff =

David E. Scharff, M.D. is an American psychiatrist, psychoanalyst, author, and academic known for his contributions to object relations theory and the development of psychoanalytic approaches to couple and family therapy. He is a Clinical Professor of Psychiatry at Georgetown University and the Uniformed Services University of the Health Sciences, and co-founder and former Director of the International Psychotherapy Institute. In 2021, he received the Sigourney Award for distinguished contributions to psychoanalysis.

== Early life and education ==
Scharff earned his Bachelor of Arts degree from Yale University in 1962. He subsequently received his Doctor of Medicine (M.D.) degree from Harvard Medical School in 1966. Following medical school, he completed his residency in psychiatry at the Massachusetts Mental Health Center, and pursued a fellowship in child psychiatry at Beth Israel Hospital in Boston and Children's Hospital in Washington, D.C. He later undertook additional advanced training at the Tavistock Centre in London, focusing on adolescent psychotherapy, object relations theory, and organizational consultation.

== Career ==
Scharff began publishing in the fields of psychiatry and psychoanalysis in the 1970s, with early work addressing developmental transitions and therapeutic technique. He became board certified in both adult and child psychiatry, and certified in psychoanalysis for both adults and children. From 1987–1994 he was the director of the Washington School of Psychiatry.

He subsequently held academic appointments as Clinical Professor of Psychiatry at Georgetown University and the Uniformed Services University of the Health Sciences. He also served as a Teaching Analyst at the Washington Psychoanalytic Institute and a Supervising Analyst at the International Institute for Psychoanalytic Training. He served as president of the American Association of Sexuality Educators, Counselors and Therapists (AASECT) from 1989 to 1990.

In the 1990s, he co-founded the International Psychotherapy Institute (IPI). His international work expanded through partnerships in China, Russia, and Latin America, including the launch of Psychoanalysis and Psychotherapy in China, a journal dedicated to cross-cultural psychoanalytic dialogue.

Scharff has served as Chair of the International Psychoanalytical Association's Committee on Couple and Family Psychoanalysis.

In 2021, Scharff received the Sigourney Award, an international honor granted annually for outstanding contributions to psychoanalysis. He was honoured alongside his wife and collaborator Jill Savege Scharff, for their joint work in advancing international psychoanalytic education and for pioneering the development of tele-analysis.

== Works ==
Scharff has authored and edited over 30 books and numerous journal articles, with a primary focus on object relations theory, couple and family psychoanalysis, and the internal dynamics of the therapeutic relationship. His early work established him as a prominent interpreter of object relations concepts, particularly in relation to intimate and familial relationships.

Among his most influential texts is 'Object Relations Couple Therapy (1997)', which is frequently cited in clinical literature for its articulation of how unconscious object relations shape couple dynamics. His co-authored book 'The Interpersonal Unconscious (2011)' extends this work by emphasizing the shared unconscious processes between patient and therapist.

Scharff has also edited several volumes, including 'The Use of the Object in Psychoanalysis (2018)', which has been reviewed as a substantial contribution to contemporary psychoanalytic theory and practice. His work in cross-cultural psychoanalysis is notable, particularly through his role as founding editor of Psychoanalysis and Psychotherapy in China.

== Selected bibliography ==
- Object Relations Couple Therapy (1997)
- Tuning the therapeutic instrument: Affective learning of psychotherapy (2000)
- The Interpersonal Unconscious (2011, with Jill Savege Scharff)
- Psychoanalytic Couple Therapy: Foundations of Theory and Practice (Editor, 2014)
- Psychoanalysis in China (2014)
- The Use of the Object in Psychoanalysis (Editor, 2018)
- Family and Couple Psychoanalysis: A Global Perspective (Co-editor, 2017)
