= Jill Savege Scharff =

American physician-psychoanalyst

Jill Savege Scharff, M.D., FABP, MRC. PSYCH is a Scottish-American psychoanalyst, psychiatrist, author and teacher known for her contributions to object relations theory, psychoanalysis, psychoanalytic psychotherapy, and the development of teleanalysis. In the 1990s she co-founded the International Psychotherapy Institute (IPI) with psychoanalyst David E. Scharff, MD. She served as the founding chair of its International Institute for Psychoanalytic Training (IIPT), as well as training programs in psychoanalytic psychotherapy and supervision. She received the Sigourney Award in 2021 for her work in advancing psychoanalysis through distance education and virtual analytic practice.

== Early life and education ==
Jill Savege Scharff received her medical degree (MB ChB) from the University of Aberdeen in Scotland in 1967. Following her graduation, she trained in psychiatry and became a Member of the Royal College of Psychiatrists in the United Kingdom. Later, in the United States, she trained as a psychoanalyst and became Fellow of the American Board of Psychoanalysis (FABP).

== Career ==
Jill Savege Scharff began her career in clinical psychiatry and psychoanalysis, with a theoretical foundation in object relations theory. She has worked in both the United Kingdom and the United States, and has held many academic and institutional roles. She is a Clinical Professor of Psychiatry at Georgetown University and a Teaching Analyst at the Washington Psychoanalytic Institute, and a Teaching Analyst at the Washington Psychoanalytic Institute.

Scharff has been recognized for her work in telepsychiatry and teleanalysis, particularly in adapting psychoanalytic training and supervision to online platforms. She has taught and supervised clinicians across North America, Europe, Asia, and Africa through virtual education models. In recognition of her work in distance psychoanalytic education and international training, Scharff was awarded the 2021 Sigourney Award alongside her husband and long-time collaborator, David E. Scharff, M.D.

=== Major works ===
Jill Savege Scharff is recognized for her work in object relations theory, a branch of psychoanalysis that emphasizes the internalization of interpersonal relationships and their influence on psychic development. Her clinical writing has explored themes such as projective and introjective identification, the therapist's use of self, couple and family dynamics, and the treatment of trauma.

Scharff has authored and edited numerous books and scholarly articles, both independently and in collaboration with David E. Scharff. Together, they contributed to the development of object relations family therapy and object relations couple therapy, integrating psychoanalytic theory with systemic and relational approaches.

One of her solo publications Projective and Introjective Identification and the Use of the Therapist's Self (1992), has been cited in psychoanalytic training literature and supervision.

In response to developments in global psychoanalytic education, Scharff contributed to the use of teleanalysis and the online delivery of psychoanalytic supervision and training. She edited the four-volume series Psychoanalysis Online, examining how distance and virtual communication affect the therapeutic process.

She is the co‑editor of the Library of Object Relations and the series editor of the Library of Technology and Mental Health, both published by Jason Aronson and later by Rowman & Littlefield. These series include works focusing on the application of psychoanalytic theory in clinical practice and related fields.

== Selected bibliography ==
- Object Relations Family Therapy (1991) with Scharff, David E.
- Projective and Introjective Identification and the Use of the Therapist's Self (1992).
- Object Relations Individual Therapy (1998).
- Object Relations Couple Therapy (2000) with Scharff, David E.
- Object Relations Therapy of Physical and Sexual Trauma (2001).
- The Primer of Object Relations (2nd ed.) (2005) with Scharff, David E.
- Tuning the Therapeutic Instrument: Affective Learning of Psychotherapy (2009).
- An Introduction to Child and Adolescent Psychoanalytic Psychotherapy (2024).
- Arminda Aberastury's Theory and Technique of Child Analysis (2025) with de Setton, Lea S.

== Personal life ==
Jill Savege Scharff is married to David E. Scharff, a fellow psychoanalyst and psychiatrist. The couple has collaborated extensively on scholarly works related to object relations theory, couple and family therapy, and teleanalysis. They reside in Chevy Chase, Maryland, where they maintain a joint private practice.
