= Inside Higher Ed =

News website

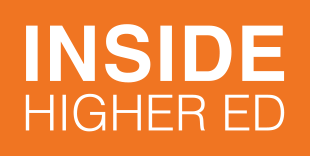
- Type: News website
- Format: Online newspaper
- Founder(s): Scott Jaschik and Doug Lederman
- Editor: Doug Lederman
- Founded: 2004; 22 years ago
- Headquarters: Washington, D.C., U.S.
- Circulation: 3.67 million monthly, as of April 2020
- OCLC number: 721351944
- Website: insidehighered.com

Inside Higher Ed is an American online publication of news, opinion, resources, events and jobs in the higher education sphere. It also publishes a weekly podcast, "The Key with Inside Higher Ed". As of 2020, Inside Higher Ed's website attracts millions of monthly visitors, in addition to newsletter subscribers.

In 2022, Quad Partners, a private equity firm, sold Inside Higher Ed to Times Higher Education, itself owned by Inflexion Private Equity. The publication is based in Washington, D.C.

== History ==
Inside Higher Ed was founded in 2004 by Scott Jaschik and Doug Lederman, two former editors of The Chronicle of Higher Education, as well as Kathlene Collins, formerly a business manager for The Chronicle.

In 2015, Quad Partners acquired a controlling interest in the publication.

== Content ==
Inside Higher Ed publishes daily and content includes news stories, opinion essays and career advice. The publication also hosts several blogs on education topics, including "Confessions of a Community College Dean", "Conditionally Accepted", and "GradHacker". It also publishes Admissions Insider, an online publication about college admissions and enrollment news. In 2018, Inside Higher Ed began publishing supplemental reports in addition to its regular news and editorial offerings. Inside Higher Ed publishes a weekly podcast, "The Key with Inside Higher Ed", in which editors and reporters discuss the challenges posed to higher education by the pandemic and recession, with a particular focus on lower-income students.

Since 2012, Inside Higher Ed and Gallup have partnered to annually survey higher education professionals. In addition, Inside Higher Ed publishes the American Association of University Professors' (AAUP) Faculty Compensation Survey data.

Inside Higher Ed's content regularly appears in other publications such as Slate and Business Insider. Inside Higher Ed has been recognized by the Association for the Study of Higher Education and the National Association of Student Personnel Administrators' Student Affairs Administrators in Higher Education.
