= Commodification of nature =

The commodification of nature is an area of research within critical environmental studies that is concerned with the ways in which natural entities and processes are made exchangeable through the market, and the implications thereof.

Drawing upon the work of Karl Marx, Karl Polanyi, James O'Connor and David Harvey, this area of work is normative and critical, based in Marxist geography and political ecology. Theorists use a commodification framing in order to contest the perspectives of "market environmentalism," which sees marketization as a solution to environmental degradation. The environment has been a key site of conflict between proponents of the expansion of market norms, relations and modes of governance and those who oppose such expansion. Critics emphasize the contradictions and undesirable physical and ethical consequences brought about by the commodification of natural resources (as inputs to production and products) and processes (environmental services or conditions).

Most researchers who employ a commodification of nature framing invoke a Marxian conceptualization of commodities as "objects produced for sale on the market" that embody both use and exchange value. Commodification itself is a process by which goods and services not produced for sale are converted into an exchangeable form. It involves multiple elements, including privatization, alienation, individuation, abstraction, valuation and displacement.

As capitalism expands in breadth and depth, more and more things previously external to the system become "internalized," including entities and processes that are usually considered "natural." Nature, as a concept, however, is very difficult to define, with many layers of meaning, including external environments as well as humans themselves. Political ecology and other critical conceptions draw upon strands within Marxist geography that see nature as "socially produced," with no neat boundary separating the "social" from the "natural." Still, the commodification of entities and processes that are considered natural is viewed as a "special case" based on nature's biophysical materiality, which "shape[es] and condition[s] trajectories of commodification."

== Origins and development ==
=== Classical liberalism and enclosure ===
The commodification of nature has its origins in the rise of capitalism. In England and later elsewhere, "enclosure" involved attacks upon and eventual near-elimination of the commons—a long, contested and frequently violent process Marx referred to as "primitive accumulation."

Classical liberalism, the ideological aspect of this process, was closely bound to questions of the environment. Privatization was presented as "more conducive to the careful stewardship of natural resources than the commons" by thinkers like Bentham, Locke and Malthus. The neo-Malthusian discourse of Garrett Hardin's "Tragedy of the Commons" (1968) parallels this perspective, reconceptualizing public goods as "scarce commodities" requiring either privatization or strong state control.

As Foster points out in Ecology Against Capitalism, the environment is not a commodity (such as most things are treated in capitalism) but it is rather the biosphere that sustains all life that we know of. However, in society, it is treated as a capitalistic value. For example, a price is put on lumber in a certain forest or the quality of water in a river or stream, or the minerals that are available under ground. These ways of putting a price on the ecosystem tend to forget to put a price on exploiting it. This can cause more damage to an ecosystem if the externalities for business are not taken into consideration. One way to fix this problem is taxes that will increase the cost of environmental damage. For example, a carbon tax would help society get off of fossil fuels and go towards renewables much faster. This is one step that many scientists and experts agree needs to happen in order to transition away from fossil fuels and delay or even prevent man-made climate change. Deregulation of governmental programs such as the EPA, and other environmental organizations may be good for business, but it doesn't serve the people who must live on a more polluted earth.

=== Capitalist expansion ===
Marxists define capitalism as a socio-economic system whose central goal is the accumulation of more wealth through the production and exchange of commodities. While the commodity form is not unique to capitalism, in it economic production is motivated increasingly by exchange. Competition provides constant pressure for innovation and growth in a "restless and unstable process," making the system expansionary and "tendentially all-encompassing."

Through market globalization, the tendency Marx described in the Communist Manifesto in which "[t]he need of a constantly expanding market for its products chases the bourgeoisie over the entire surface of the globe," capitalism converts nature into "an appendage of the production process." As Neil Smith argues, "[n]o part of the earth's surface, the atmosphere, the oceans, the geological substratum, or the biological superstratum are immune from transformation by capital."

=== Neoliberal nature ===
Since the late 1980s, an ideology of "market environmentalism" has gained prominence within environmental policy. Such a perspective is based in neoclassical economic theory, which sees degradation as a result of the absence of prices in environmental goods. Market environmentalism gained widespread acceptance through the rise of neoliberalism, an approach to human affairs in which the "free market" is given priority and money-mediated relations are seen as the best way to deliver services.

A neoliberal approach constructs nature as a "world currency," valued in international markets and given "the opportunity to earn its own right to survive." This "selling nature to save it" approach requires economic valuation — either indirectly, as with cost-benefit analysis and contingent valuation, or through direct commodification. Critics of neoliberal environmental policy argue that this reduces the importance of species survival "into a price whose rise or fall is entangled with bets on their susceptibility to irreversible loss, underscored by a calculus whereby species value rises with rarity, or greater risk of extinction". Thus, neoliberal interventions like ecotourism and bioprospecting are viewed by critics as ways of forcing nature to earn its right to survive in the global marketplace. Critical scholarship on neoliberal conservation has been found to form a highly internally coherent body of literature that rarely cites or is cited by economically oriented conservation finance research.

While commodification efforts are propelled in large part by private firms seeking new areas of investment and avenues for the circulation of capital, there are also explicit policy prescriptions for privatization and market exchange of resources, production byproducts and processes as the best means to rationally manage and conserve the environment.

The neoliberal commodification of nature and its exploitation in the global south for the profits of the global north is also known as ecological imperialism, whereby ecological racism is understood as part of ecological imperialism.

=== Stretching and deepening ===
The commodification of nature occurs through two distinct "moments" as capitalization "stretches" its reach to include greater distances of space and time, and "deepens" to penetrate into more types of goods and services. External nature becomes an "accumulation strategy" for capital, through traditional examples like mining and agriculture as well as new "commodity frontiers" in bioprospecting and ecotourism.

David Harvey sees this as "the wholesale commodification of nature in all its forms," a "new wave of 'enclosing the commons'" that employs environmentalism in the service of the rapid expansion of capitalism. This "accumulation by dispossession" releases assets at very low or zero cost, providing immediate profitability and counteracting overaccumulation.

== Aspects of commodification ==
At the most abstract level, commodification is a process through which qualitatively different things are made equivalent and exchangeable through the medium of money. By taking on a general quality of exchange value, they become commensurable.

Commodification turns on this apparent dissolution of qualitative difference and its "renegotiation," as commodities are standardized in order to maintain a constant identity across space and time.

Commodity status is not something intrinsic to a natural entity, but is rather an assigned quality, brought about through an active process. The conversion of a whole class of goods or services necessitates changes in the way nature is conceptualized and discursively represented.

There is no "single path" to commodification. Noel Castree stresses that commodification in fact involves several interrelated aspects, or "relational moments," that should not be confused or conflated as they can be employed independently of each other.

Element	Meaning
Privatization	Assigning of legal title over a commodity to a particular actor
Alienability	Capacity of a given commodity to be physically and morally separated from sellers
Individuation	Separating a commodity from supporting context through legal and material boundaries
Abstraction	Setting individual things as equivalent based on classifiable similarities
Valuation	Monetizing the value of a commodity
Displacement	Spatiotemporal separation, obscuring origins and relations

Privatization is the assigning of legal title to an entity or process. A commodity needs to be owned, either by an individual or a group, in order to be traded. Privatization of natural entities can entail enclosure or the representation thereof (as with intellectual property rights), and represents a shift in social relations, changing rights of access, use and disposal as things move from communally-, state- or unowned modes into private hands.

Alienability is the capacity of a given commodity to be separated, physically and morally, from its seller. If a commodity is not alienable, it cannot be exchanged and is thus shielded from the market. For example, human organs might be privatized (owned by their bearer) but very rarely would they be considered alienable.

Individuation is the representational and physical act of separating a commodity from its supporting context through legal and/or material boundaries. This could involve "splitting" an ecosystem into legally defined and tradable property rights to specific services or resources.

Abstraction is the assimilation of a given thing into a broader type or process, the transformation of particular things into classes. Through functional abstraction, "wetlands" are constructed as a generic category despite the uniqueness of physical sites and different gasses and activities are equated through carbon markets. Through spatial abstraction things in one place are treated as the same as things located elsewhere so that both can form part of the same market.

Valuation is the manifestation of all expressions of worth (aesthetic, practical, ethical, et cetera) through a single exchange value. Monetization is thus foundational to capitalism, rendering things commensurable and exchangeable, allowing for the separation of production, circulation and consumption over great gulfs of time and space.

Displacement involves something appearing as "something other than itself." Commodities might be better thought of as "socio-natural relations" than reified as things "in and of themselves," but through spatio-temporal separation of producers and consumers, the histories and relations of commodities become obscured. This is Marx's commodity fetishism, the "making invisible" of the social relationships and embeddedness of production.

== Problems with commodification ==
Critics see environmental degradation as stemming from these processes of commodification, and generally include at least implicit criticism of one or more aspect. There appear to be three broad "problem areas" from which the commodification of nature is critiqued: practical, in terms of whether or not nature can be properly made into a commodity; moral, in terms of the ethical implications of commodification; and consequential, in terms of the effects of commodification on nature itself.

=== Practical problems ===
Much of the literature relates commodification of nature to the issue of materiality—the significance of biophysical properties and context. The qualitative differences of a heterogeneous biophysical world are seen to be analytically and practically significant, sources of unpredictability and resistance to human intention that also shape and provide opportunities for capital circulation and accumulation.

The tangible non-human world thus affects the construction of social and economic relations and practice, inscribing ecology in the dynamics of capital. While some "natures" are readily subsumed by capitalism, others "resist" complete commodification, displaying a form of "agency." The ecological characteristics of marine fish, for example, affect the forms that privatization, industry structure and regulation can take. Water, also, does not commodify easily due to its physical properties, which leads to differentiation in its governing institutions.

The demarcation and pricing of nature-based commodities is thus problematic. Divisibility and exclusion are difficult, as it is often not possible to draw clean property rights around environmental services or resources. Likewise, pricing is a problem as many species, landscapes and services are unique or otherwise irreplaceable and incommensurable. Their monetary values are thus in many ways arbitrary, as they do not follow changes in quality or quantity but rather social preference, failing to convey "real" ecological value or reasons for conservation.

=== Moral difficulties ===
A single monetary value also denies the multiplicity of values which could be attributed to nature — non-monetary systems of cultural and social importance. The environment can express relations between generations as a sort of heritage. Livelihood, territorial rights and "sacredness" poorly translate into prices, and dividing a communal-social value — a forest, for instance — into private property rights can undermine the relations and identity of a community.

Neoliberal policies have been implicated in greatly altered patterns of access and use. Markets generally deal poorly with issues of procedural fairness and equitable distribution, and critics see commodification as producing greater levels of inequality in power and participation while reinforcing existing vulnerabilities. Ecosystem benefits might be considered "normative public goods" — even when commodified, there is a sense that individuals ought to not be excluded from access. When water privatization prices people out, for instance, a sense of use rights inspires protest. While neoliberal approaches are often presented as neutral or objective, they disguise highly political approaches to resources and the interests and power of certain actors.

=== Problematic consequences ===
Through commodification, natural entities and services become vehicles for the realization of profit, subject to the pressures of the market where efficiency overrides other concerns. With climate commodities, the profit motive incentivizes buyers and sellers to ignore the steady erosion of the climate mitigation goal. Market exchange is "reason-blind," but without rational assessment of different strategies and the ecological importance of particular natural entities, commodification cannot effectively deliver on conservation.

Harvey thus declares that there is something "inherently anti-ecological" about capitalist commodification. It ignores and simplifies complex relations, obscuring origins and narrowing things to a single service or standard unit. The treatment of things as the same for a particular end — either profit or a single utility — leads to a homogenization and simplification of the biophysical. As governments and private firms seek to maximize carbon content for emissions markets, they invest preferably in tree plantations over complex forest ecosystems, eliminating species diversity, density and resulting in domino effects on processes such as water flow.

The neglect of relational aspects also ignores the emergent and embedded character of ecosystem functions. Components are frequently dependent on each other and the result of interactions between biotic and non-biotic factors across space and at multiple levels. Alienation and individuation may thus be counterproductive to the provision of ecosystem services, and veils human perception of what an ecosystem is and how it functions—and consequently how to best conserve and repair it. John Bellamy Foster argues that neglect of such relational aspects is a result of economic reductionism. This reductionism leads to an inefficiency in promoting biodiversity since as ecosystems are simplified into more basic commodities they can no longer support as diverse a set of organisms as they could pre-commodification. This creates a concern that the commodification of nature lends itself toward undermining biodiversity through its pursuit of attaching a value to nature.

Karl Polanyi voiced this concern when addressing the concept of treating nature as a commodity. If nature were treated as a commodity it would be concentrated down to its base parts and destroyed. Polanyi highlighted many of the concerns that contemporary environmentalists have by noting that nature's commodification would lead to its pollution, overuse, and eventually imperil human life

== Crisis and resistance ==
=== Incomplete capitalization and the fictitious commodity ===
When confronted with natural "barriers to accumulation," capitalists attempt to overcome them through technical and social innovation. This often involves the modification of nature to fit the needs of production and exchange, allowing for fuller realization of profits. Nature is "subsumed" to capitalist accumulation, losing its "independent" capacity and approaching "the archetype of a 'pure' commodity."

However, as nature becomes "rationalized" and internalized, increasing the control of capitalists over exchange, production and distribution, a new contradiction emerges. Capitalist penetration into natural commodities can never be complete, because a certain amount of production, by definition, takes place prior to human intervention. Because natural entities and processes do not require capital or labor to be produced, and their social, cultural and/or ecological value exceeds the market value placed upon them, they are considered pseudo- or fictitious commodities. This basic fictitiousness is the origin of the material contradictions that arise when natural commodities are treated as if they were "true" commodities, as completely privatizable, alienable, separable, et cetera.

=== Possible consequences of commodifying nature ===
Many scholars believe that ecology and capitalism are against one another regarding climate change. As environmental economics is a relatively new field of study, and capitalism a significantly older economic system, radical change of current capitalist systems is highly unlikely while internalization of natural resources into the economy is much more feasible. John Bellamy Foster believes that commodification of nature might be more dangerous than the impending danger of climate change and ecologic disaster. Foster fears that commodification of nature might lead to a system that favors economy over ecology (endangering natural resources) and promote a form of neocolonialism that acknowledges the elements of capitalism, globalization, and cultural imperialism, but disregards the idea of colonialism altogether.

=== Degradation of resources, underproduction of conditions ===
As fictitious commodities with origins outside of capitalist production, the value of nature, counter to the neoclassical assumption, cannot be fully accounted for in monetary terms, and there is a resultant tendency toward the overexploitation and "underproduction" of nature.

Natural entities that are commodified are subjected to the competitive drive for accumulation. Capitalism is "ecologically irrational," with a systematic tendency to overexploit its natural resource base. At the same time, what O'Connor terms the "conditions of production" (all the phenomena upon which capitalism depends but is unable to produce itself, including environmental conditions and processes) are subjected to indiscriminate degradation as they cannot be fully commodified. This is the "second contradiction" of capitalism, between the relations and forces of production and its conditions. Capitalism undermines its own production system, "producing its own scarcity."

=== Reclaiming the commons? ===
Recruiting nature into relations of capitalist exchange "incites a good deal of push back," as these entities and services "matter a great deal to ordinary people." Social needs compete politically for access and control of an increasingly commodified nature, and as price is insufficient to resolve these competing claims, counter-movements emerge, expressing the "crisis tendencies" of capitalist nature through socio-political struggles over representation and access.

Protest movements, transnational coalitions, instances of alternative practices and counter-discourses all fall within a broad tent of resistance struggles to "reclaim the commons." This can be seen as Polanyi's "double movement," in which tendencies toward and against market coordination interact, based in a rejection of the treatment of the environment as alienable market goods.

== Specific Examples in Modern Society ==
While there are numerous natural resources that are being capitalized upon all across the world, there are several more notable examples of commodification of nature. The following examples are some that are either more prevalent or larger in scale and scope.

=== Emissions Trading ===
Emissions trading, commonly referred to as cap and trade, embodies commodification of nature in that it allows for the trade of pollution and emissions within a given limit for a specific environment. Rather than simply outright prohibiting or allowing pollution and other various negative externalities, cap and trade essentially permits members of an industry to buy and sell units of emission with a maximum set for the industry as a whole.

While there are various outlooks on whether emissions trading is effective in cutting emissions or pollution, it is pertinent to understand that this concept takes a company or individual's emissions and presents them as something that can be bought or sold on a specialized market.

=== Drinking Water ===
As capitalism has spread in leaps and bounds, so too has its reach on previously universal resources; one such resource is drinking water.

Water, a fundamental resource to human survival, now is a multibillion-dollar industry. Essentially what this means is that something that used to be completely free and public has been taken and turned into a privatized service. One modern example of water commodification is the current conflict going on in Flint, Michigan.

=== Petroleum ===
As petroleum has begun to be used for fuel and other various mechanical and transportation uses, the demand for the natural resource has skyrocketed. As a result, an economic industry has formed that completely revolves around the extraction and sale of the resource. By extension, many other industries also rely on the resource such as the automotive industry or anyone that relies on transportation for their business.

Oil is just one of many natural resources being taken from the environment to be sold in markets of various size and influence across the globe.

== See also ==
- Accumulation by dispossession
- Commodification
- Commodity (Marxism)
- Commodity fetishism
- The commons
- Critical geography
- Eco-socialism
- Environmental sociology
- Green imperialism
- Neoliberalism
- Political ecology
- Primitive accumulation of capital
- Tragedy of the commons
- Emissions trading
- Commodification of water
- Natural resource
