= Symbolic equation =

Symbolic equation is the term used in Kleinian psychoanalysis for states of thinking which equate current objects with those of the past, rather than finding a resemblance between the two sets.

== Origins ==
Hanna Segal developed the concept of the symbolic equation in the 1950s, during her examination of concrete thinking in the schizophrenic. Its roots however have been traced back as far as Freud's Studies on Hysteria of 1895, where he noted how a phrase like a 'stab in the heart' could be concretised in terms of the original physical sensations behind it, so that "we find a symbolic version in concrete images and sensations of more artificial turns of speech".

== Themes ==
Symbolic equations have been connected to the splitting of the paranoid-schizoid position; alternatively they can be seen as the result of a failure to make distinctions between self and others, or between real and idealised objects.

== Examples ==
- Psychological trauma can lead to a collapse of the boundaries between inner and outer worlds, so that anything reminiscent of the trauma becomes by symbolic equation the trauma itself.
- Anxiety in nursing is correlated with the varying ability to relate symbolically to patients: where the latter are seen as symbolising the nurse's own damaged inner objects, care can be provided with manageable anxiety, but where patients are symbolically equated with parts of the self, anxiety spikes, leading either to despair or to grandiose attempts at healing.

== Alternate usages ==
- In classical psychoanalysis, symbolic equation is used merely to specify the object to which a symbol relates, as when Otto Fenichel writes of "the symbolic equation money = feces".
- For Jacques Lacan's linguistically based Symbolic order, a symbolic equation would mark the presence of (unarticulated) meaning, prior to its entrance into a linguistic code.

== See also ==
- Elliott Jaques
- Mentalization
- Peter Fonagy
- Psychic equivalence
