= Goethe Award for Psychoanalytic and Psychodynamic Scholarship =

The Goethe Award for Psychoanalytic and Psychodynamic Scholarship is given annually by the Section on Psychoanalytic and Psychodynamic Psychology of the Canadian Psychological Association. The award is given for the best psychoanalytic book published within the past two years and is juried by a peer review process and awards committee.

== History of the award ==
In 1930, Freud was awarded the Goethe Prize of the City of Frankfurt for his literary and recognized scientific achievements. The Goethe Award for Psychoanalytic and Psychodynamic Scholarship was named in honour of this event. The Goethe Award was first given by the Section in 2001 and considers any disciplinary or interdisciplinary subject matter in theoretical, clinical, or applied psychodynamic or psychoanalytic psychology and is judged on the basis of providing an outstanding contribution to the field.

== Recipients of the award ==
- 2015 - Patrick Luyten, Handbook of Psychodynamic Approaches to Psychopathology
- 2014 - Philip A. Ringstrom, A Relational Psychoanalytic Approach to Couples Psychotherapy
- 2013
- 2012 – Jon Mills, Conundrums: A Critique of Contemporary Psychoanalysis
- 2011 – Nancy McWilliams, Psychoanalytic Diagnosis, Second Edition: Understanding Personality Structure in the Clinical Process
- 2010 – Jeremy Holmes, Exploring In Security: Towards an Attachment-Informed Psychoanalytic Psychotherapy
- 2009 – Lori C. Bohm, Rebecca C. Curtis, Brent Willock, Taboo or Not Taboo? Forbidden Thoughts, Forbidden Acts in Psychoanalysis and Psychotherapy
- 2008 – Irwin Hirsch, Coasting in the Countertransference: Conflicts of Self-Interest Between Analyst and Patient
- 2007 – Francois Ansermet & Pierre Magistretti, Biology of Freedom: Neural Plasticity, Experience, and the Unconscious
- 2006 – Linda Hopkins, False Self: The Life of Masud Khan
- 2005 – Elizabeth Ann Danto, Freud’s Free Clinics. New York: Columbia University Press
- 2004 – Paul Verhaeghe, On Being Normal and Other Disorders: A Manual for Clinical Psychodiagnostics
- 2003 – Muriel Dimen, Sexuality, Intimacy, Power
- 2002 – Peter Fonagy, Gyorgy Gergely; Elliot L. Jurist & Mary Target, Affect Regulation, Mentalisation and the Development of the Self
- 2001 – Charles B. Strozier, Heinz Kohut: The Making of a Psychoanalyst

== See also ==
- List of psychology awards
