= Castree =

Castree is a surname. Notable people with the surname include:

- Noel Castree (born 1968), British geographer
- Ronald Castree (born 1953), English murderer
