= Paul Verhaeghe =

Belgian psychologist

Paul Verhaeghe (born November 5, 1955, in Roeselare) is a Belgian professor of clinical psychology and psychoanalysis.

== Studies ==
In 1978, Verhaeghe graduated with a master's degree in psychology from the University of Ghent (RUG). In 1985, he obtained his PhD in clinical psychology (RUG) and in 1992 a special doctorate in psychodiagnostics (RUG). He received his initial psychoanalytical training at the Belgian School for Psychoanalysis (training analyst J. Schotte) and then at the École de la Cause Freudienne (Paris-Brussels).

== Employment ==
After his studies, Verhaeghe worked for some time as a clinical psychologist and psychotherapist at a mental health centre (GGZ) in Sint-Niklaas and then also for some time at the Special Youth Care centre in Eeklo. In late 1981, he started his PhD research at the University of Ghent. He did this under the guidance of prof. Julien Quackelbeen, with whom he co-wrote many articles. In 1992 he was appointed Associate Professor. In 1996, he acquired the rank of Full Professor. He teaches clinical psychodiagnostics, psychoanalytical therapy and gender studies. He was head of the Department of Psychoanalysis and Clinical Consulting from 1999 through October 2014.

== Work ==
In 1998, Verhaeghe became known for the publication of Liefde in tijden van eenzaamheid (Love in a Time of Loneliness), a psychoanalytic reading of the postmodern man-woman relationship. Despite its levels of difficulty, the book was an unexpected success and has since been translated into eight languages. In 2008, a slightly reworked version of the book was published by the Bezige Bij publishing house.

Until 2000, Verhaeghe mainly published articles in which he tried to combine the work of Sigmund Freud and Jacques Lacan into a theory, which is useful according to psychoanalysts. With Over normaliteit en andere afwijkingen (2000), he tried to offer an alternative to the DSM diagnostic system; the U.S. edition of this book On Being Normal and Other Disorders received the Goethe Award. One point of special interest in this work is his redefinition of the neglected Freudian diagnostic category of "actual neurosis". Here, the clinical category of actual pathology, where affect regulation, identity formation and (impaired) interpersonal relationships combine at the level of aetiology, is proposed to offer a more useful basis for the diagnosis and treatment of contemporary mental illness.

Shortly after 2000, he was part of a study group under the auspices of the IPA (International Psychoanalytic Association) on the interface between neuroscience and psychoanalysis. The collaboration with Jaak Panksepp and Mark Solms, among others, convinced him of the futility of any approach trying to understand humans solely on a psychological or a somatic level. On this basis, in Het einde van de psychotherapie (The end of psychotherapy), he adopts a very critical position against the reduction of psychological and psychiatric disorders to neurobiological, hereditary diseases, and in Identiteit (Identity) against a positivistic and individualistic approach to psychology.

In New studies of old villains. A radical reconsideration of the Oedipus Complex (2009), an essay in book form, Verhaeghe elaborated his views on the Freudian and Lacanian Oedipus complex.

In 2010 he was invited by the Louise Bourgeois Studios (New York) to work together on a collection of essays on her work. He was one of the first to have full access to her diaries and, based on these, could present a new approach to her work.

At the start of the new millennium, he turned his attention to the relation between social change and the explosive growth of mental disorders in combination with the ever-increasing dominance of psychodiagnostic labelling (DSM). In a keynote lecture in Dublin (2007) he stated that classical psychotherapy is disappearing because of the combined effect of DSM-diagnostics and the reduction of psychotherapy to evidence based practices. These ideas were further elaborated in his book Het einde van de psychotherapie (The End of Psychotherapy) (2009), which saw ten reprints in a short period of time.

Based on the research into burnout and depression carried out by his department, his attention increasingly focused on the combined effects of changes in society and work organisation. He elaborated these ideas during a lecture at the Oikos Academy in 2010. Both the printed (Verhaeghe, 2011) and digital publication of this lecture (website of the think tank Liberales) was widely received and awarded 'essay of the year' in 2011 by Liberales.

Its further exploration brought him to the conclusion that contemporary identity is based on a compelling neoliberal ideology and that such an identity goes against our evolutionarily ingrained social nature. At the end of January 2012, during a Belgian national strike, Verhaeghe gave a sharp public lecture at the art centre Vooruit, Ghent, explaining how neoliberalism has done away with politics. Later that year, he gave the annual Paul Verbraeken lecture in Antwerp where he argued that neoliberalism is a contemporary form of social Darwinism, using the university and the hospital as case studies. The subsequent publication of the text received a lot of attention in Flanders. This lecture reappeared in two chapters of Identiteit (Identity), published in the autumn of 2012. Both in the Netherlands and Flanders this book found its way to a wide audience, both left and right wing, and was subsequently translated into German and English (published as What About Me?).

In the first section of Identiteit Verhaeghe argues that our psychological identity is a construction on top of a well-founded evolutionary substructure. Evolutionarily, man is a social animal in which two opposing behavioural tendencies are at work: on the one hand he gravitates towards community and sharing, on the other, towards individualism and taking. Which of these two tendencies prevail in the construction of identity is largely determined by the societal model. In the second section, he describes contemporary society as neoliberal, with neo-liberalism as a new version of social Darwinism. The concomitant development of identity is thus, according to Verhaeghe, very negative, as it goes against the social nature of man. The structure and organisation of education, scientific research and healthcare are used as case studies to illustrate this. In the final chapter he argues that change will have to emerge from the bottom up, given that the neoliberal ideology is now a part of our identity.

Recently, he has turned to a new subject: patriarchal authority and its disappearance.

== Criticism ==
In December 2011, he and his department were criticised in De Standaard by several Ghent philosophers of science, including Maarten Boudry and Griet Vandermassen, who claimed that psychoanalysis, which Verhaeghe advocates, was pseudoscientific. Verhaeghe's colleague Stijn Vanheule defended psychoanalysis on radio programme Peeters & Pichal against Boudry's and Vandermassen's criticism.

The publication of Identiteit attracted criticism as well: Verhaeghe's critique of neoliberalism, "scientism", "Big Pharma" and DSM-5 was considered "grossly exaggerated", he was found to use "neoliberalism" as a scapegoat for all modern problems, making that term a 'catch-all full of contradictions', and paradoxically, in his "litany against prophets of doom", he was one himself. The discussion was nuanced by another group of science philosophers of the same department who criticized their colleagues for their narrow view and placed the discussion in a broader debate about what science is.

== Trivia ==
Although Paul Verhaeghe has two doctorates in psychology and is a professor of psychology, he is currently not a licensed psychologist. This profession has been protected in Belgium since the passing of the law of November 8, 1993. The procedure to use the title of psychologist would be simple in his case, but the reason he does not want to use this title has never been made public. It does mean, however, that he is not bound by the ethical code of Belgian psychologists.

== Bibliography ==
Paul Verhaeghe has published over two hundred articles and numerous books. The complete list of publications can be found on the University of Ghent website and on the author's website.
