= Commodification of water =

Process of turning water into a tradable commodity

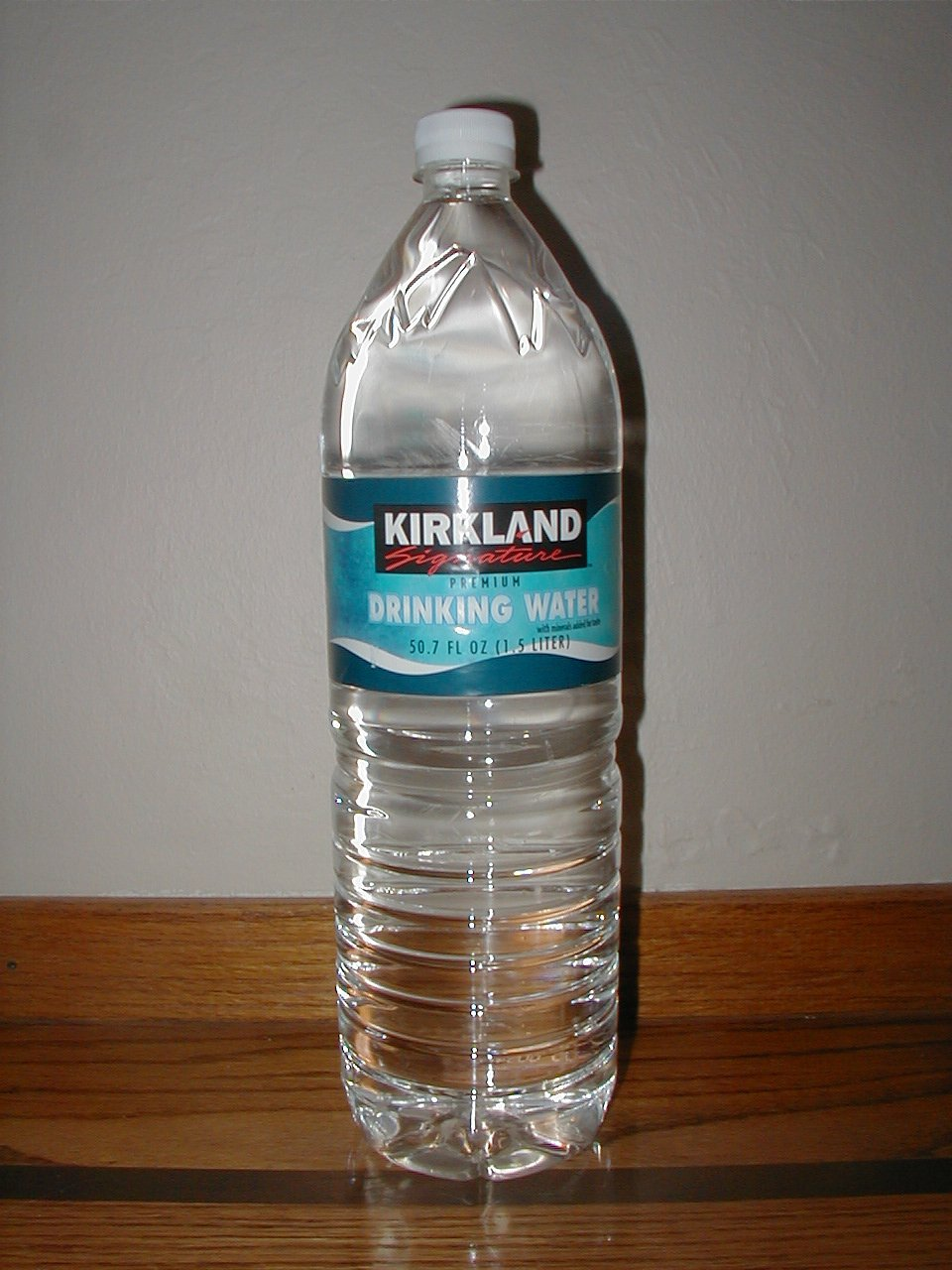
In some places, like rivers and seas, water is free. In others, it is a commodity that is being bottled and sold.

The commodification of water refers to the process of turning water, especially freshwater, from a public good into a tradable commodity also known as an economic good. This transformation introduces water as a product into a market which previously did not have water as a tradable item. Usually, this is done in the hope of seeing the resource be managed more efficiently. The commodification of water has increased significantly during the 20th century, along with the concerns for water scarcity and environmental degradation.

The emergence of the commodification of water was centered around two main views: that people might soon struggle to access water, and that government regulation of environmentally damaging behavior was ineffective. Commodification is theoretically rooted in the neoclassical discourse which says that by assigning an economic value to a good or service, one can prevent misuse. The commodification of water, although not new, is considered part of a more recent market-based approach to water governance and provokes both approval and disapproval from stakeholders.

Through the establishment of Western private property rights and market mechanisms, some argue that water will be allocated more efficiently. Karen Bakker describes this market-based approach proposed by neoliberals as "market environmentalism": a method of resource regulation that promises economic and environmental objectives can be met in tandem. To this extent the commodification of water can be viewed as an extension of capitalist and market tendencies into new spaces and social relations. Karl Marx termed this phenomenon, "primitive accumulation". For this reason there remains serious doubt as to whether commodification of water can help improve access to freshwater supplies and conserve water as a resource.

== Origins ==
Water is a basic need of life and presently, an estimated one billion persons do not have access to safe drinking water, and even more have inadequate sanitation. Global institutions, including the United Nations, warn of the impact of a growing global population and the effects of climate change on the ability of people to access freshwater. This is especially concerning considering that the bottled water market has consistently earned more than four billion U.S. Dollars a year since the turn of the century. This makes the debate over improving current and future water provision an urgent one and therefore thrusts discussion over approaches to water governance into the foreground to avert a looming crisis. This theory was phrased in Fortune Magazine as:

"Water promises to be to the 21st century what oil was to the 20th century: the precious commodity that determines the wealth of nations"

Issues surrounding the provision of water are nothing new; however, the approach to the problematic has changed dramatically during the last century. For the majority of the 20th century water was publicly provisioned in an era of the Keynesian welfare state. The state incurred high capital costs in building long-lasting infrastructure that could readily supply the population with universal access to water in the pursuit of economic growth and industrialisation. The emphasis was on social equity, with water resources state owned and centrally regulated through command and control regulation. The emphasis was on providing universal access and supply led solutions. This approach was heavily criticized during the late 20th century and under the prevailing ethos of neoliberal economic globalization, commodification of water was increasingly presented as the answer. The ability of the state to continue provision of water efficiently was questioned in the latter half of the 20th century in parallel with the environmentalist movement which raised awareness of the resulting environmental degradation and ecological disturbances.

The fiscal crisis of the 1970s decreased public spending in most developed nations, leading to further deterioration of state-run infrastructure and further exacerbating problems of provision. Together with critics' insistence on state inability to operate efficiently these factors created an impetus for change in water governance. The precipitated change in attitude as to how water should be governed was market-based governance, proposed by neoliberals, and becoming the dominant approach to environmental problems. This shift in attitude led to the intensification of the commodification of water.

== Commodification ==
In neoclassical terms, a commodity is a good or service that can be traded or exchanged in the marketplace for another commodity or money. Commodification is rooted in Marxist political theory and entails the creation of an economic good that previously was not prescribed an economic value. This takes place through the application of market mechanisms with the intended result being a standardized class of goods or services. Once commodified an economic good can be bought or sold at a price determined by market exchange, and as such market values replace social values previously attached to the good. It is this transformation from a public good to an economic good that neoliberals claim leads to better management and allocation of a resource, such as water. In accordance with welfare economics, this view infers the more efficiently managed a resource is the higher a society's welfare. This neoliberal sentiment of water as an economic good not unlike any other is visible in a quote from The Economist: "Only by accepting water as a tradable commodity will sensible decisions be possible."

== Theoretical explanation ==
The theoretical reasoning for proposing commodification as an answer to environmental problems can be related back to Garrett Hardin's work "The Tragedy of the Commons". In this he proposed that environmental problems do not have a technical solution because they are common resource problems. Water has historically been classified a "common good" or part of the global commons which has led to overexploitation and poor management. According to Hardins' theory multiple individuals acting both independently and rationally will continue to deplete common resources in the pursuit of self-interest. Concerns surrounding the overexploitation of water created it as a scarce resource prompting commodification as an effort to protect it. For a commodification to be achieved the commons are enclosed into private property which provides the motivating force for conservation and efficient management in the absence of strong collective action.

Commodification places an economic value on an environmental resource which seeks to include and internalize the costs of using it within economic calculations. The logic proceeds, if a resource can be valued correctly it can be protected. To ascertain an economic value and produce a tradable commodity, commodification requires the natural object to be removed from its biophysical context thus transforming its identity and value. Through commodification water becomes responsive to market forces which are assumed to be better equipped at allocating resources and regulating environmentally damaging behavior than command and control regulation thus providing justification for the shift in attitude.

== Market-based approach ==
The creation of water as a private good and a scarce resource enabled a market-based approach to be put forward as the best available solution to protect it. This shift towards market-based solutions was not limited to water and was typical of a macroeconomic neoliberal approach to the environment. The market approach assumes that private actors will act rationally to maximize self-interest given the best information available. Markets are proposed to effectively pool knowledge allowing interaction between many stakeholders, and as a result are more effective at producing collective action and promoting public interest when compared to regulatory control.

Through commodification water is paid for on the basis of market determined supply and demand instead of ability to pay. The supposed ability of market mechanisms to realize a resource's true 'value' is assumed to lead to its protection and conservation. "Market environmentalism" best describes this sentiment and emerged from the same line of thinking as ecological modernization, proposing the market as the solution and not the cause of the problem whereby the previously antagonistic relationship between economic growth and environmental protection is reconciled allowing both objectives to be achieved. This is appealing to policymakers and private interests alike in that it envisages solutions within the capitalist system.

== Government to governance ==
In light of this, the commodification of water can be viewed as a market-based governance approach which seeks to confront conflicts between public and private interests and as such part of a broader shift in focus 'government' to 'governance'. Governance represents a new method by which society is governed which seeks to involve more stakeholders in decision making. The release of the water sector from state ownership and subsequent efforts to commodify water allow for more individual actors to participate in decision making thereby increasing the probability of consensual decisions being produced, which would not have been possible when decisions were previously made by one actor, the government.

The states role in environmental problems was realigned and scaled down to be positioned as just one of many stakeholders aligned along horizontal networks. Through public/private partnerships it is hoped that resource management will take place more effectively through the pooling of more knowledge from a wider range of stakeholders.

== Criticisms ==
Although the extent to which water has been commodified is of debate, attempts to do so have led to improvements in biological and chemical water quality as the environment has been prioritised to a greater degree in decision making. The benefits of commodification are well documented by its neoliberal proponents however criticisms concerning commodification and market environmentalism as a solution to environmental problems are less considered. Commodification inherently requires the enclosure of public assets to allow trade within the market place as economic goods. Criticism of this process identifies commodification as a systemic flaw within the capitalist system. Marx's theory of primitive accumulation describes how the capitalist system needs to continually expand into non-capitalist sectors which would have originally taken place through imperialism. Marx's criticism of commodification refers to this reckless addiction to growth and extends to the manner in which it changes a good's materiality so that natural objects lose their use value simply in exchange for a price. He believed that commodification transformed not only goods but relationships previously untouched by commerce, harming society in the process.

David Harvey built upon Marx's theory and coined the phrase "accumulation by dispossession" which refers to this notion of expansion but considers it inherent within the capitalist system, which will find ways other than imperialism to achieve its goal. This form of capital accumulation tends to direct wealth away from the poor towards the elite and direct capital from the public to the private sector. This has exacerbated social inequality and directed natural resources away from their geographical context causing damage to ecosystems across the globe.

The commodification of water has created a situation whereby the provision of the resource is in the hands of a select few multinationals, with the top two multinationals controlling approximately 75% of the industry. This 'looting of the commons' has led to amplification of already existing problems within water governance. Commodification necessitates a full recovery price and the removal of cross-subsidies to ensure free market trade. In South Africa this has led to thousands of disconnections from the water supply for those who cannot pay; commentators fear that this has harmed the health of the nation's people and decreased social equality further.

The formation of private public partnerships (PPP) is the standard model for transferring public goods to private goods with the aim to reconcile conflict between the public and private sector. They are promoted by global institutions such as the World Bank and the International Monetary Fund as the best available way to manage water resources efficiently and are rapidly increasing in number providing evidence for the global trend of commodification. The aforementioned institutions promote such behaviour by imposing lending agreements on developing nations requiring them to adopt their neoliberal principles, which leaves national governments in the developing world little choice but to adopt such practices. PPPs are intended to increase the involvement of a wider range of stakeholders through horizontal networks including NGOs, civil society, and the public and private sector, however the increasing influence of multinational companies may serve to undermine this. Multinational water companies due to their enormous size are able to exert strong pressure on national governments to cooperate with their demands. PPPs have recently been implicated in projects that have overexploited natural resources in the name of profit.

== Likelihood of full commodification ==
Conferences formed to address the issues in water governance such as the Third World Water Forum are becoming more apparent in the 21st century; however these can often fall foul to the same endemic problems outlined above. NGOs and members of civil society criticised the Third World Water Forum for failing to declare water a human right and continuing to prefer commodification as the solution to the current water crisis. They argue that the world's poor stand to become worse off as a result of commodification as objectives of social equality and universal access are traded in for economic efficiency and profit.

The social inequality and environmental degradation that have arisen are proof that economic valuation failed to take into account key social and environmental costs of using water. Nevertheless, there is opposition to the continued commodification which Karl Polanyi termed ‘counter movement’. In this case they are concerned with returning water back to the global commons. NGOs and members of civil society have formed voluntary networks with the aim of banning future decisions to further commodify water. These movements have arisen in opposition to capitalist accumulation through globalisation and are serving to decrease the trend in commodification. Full commodification faces difficulties theoretically as it relies on an economic good or service being standardised and readily exchangeable in the market place irrespective of its spatial and temporal dimensions. Bakker argues that this is nearly impossible for water due to its biophysical characteristics that contravene all efforts to fully commodify.

Capitalism depends on a changing balance between (re-)commodification and decommodification, which as Bob Jessop points out means that the processes of commodification, decommodification and recommodification will continue to appear in ‘waves’ due to capitalism's continual pursuit of accumulation by dispossession.

== Water colonization ==
Only one half of one percent of water on earth is fresh, liquid, and accessible. Some communities in the Middle East, South-Central Africa, Northern China, Western United States, and Mexico live in areas completely devoid of fresh water. More than half of the completely dry countries are in Sub-Saharan Africa, affecting a total of nearly one billion people. Despite this, water bottling corporations, energy development companies, and mining operations continue to siphon water from politically or economically poorer nearby communities. Using water in that way at this rate is primarily detrimental to poorer marginalized and indigenous communities.

Examples of this are common worldwide, but are especially dangerous when the oppressive companies set their sights on drier regions of the world. Water colonization expresses itself in ways similar to grander colonization. The capturing and acquisition of land by violence or coercion, adaptation to the culture or proceedings of the nearby people, and misguided post-hoc justification are all aspects of colonization, even on this smaller scale.

The consequences are also very similar. At threat of state violence, the residents of the community are rendered politically powerless, often end up paying for the colonization in all ways, and are left with the political, economic, and environmental consequences. The major difference is that this colonization is usually conducted by the local or state governments or corporations. Although these operations do not often involve violence, there have been examples of paramilitary groups being hired to defend corporations. These paramilitary groups have been known to kill protesters, community members, and accidental trespassers. They are also mostly purchased by the large corporations, especially for mining operations.

== See also ==
- Water resource policy
- Water privatisation
- Commodification of nature
- Accumulation by dispossession
- Tragedy of the commons
- Neoliberalism
- Capitalism
- Human needs
- Blue Gold: World Water Wars
