= Adaptive mentalization-based integrative treatment =

Adaptive mentalization-based integrative treatment (AMBIT) is a novel adaptation (by Dickon Bevington, Peter Fuggle, Liz Cracknell, Peter Fonagy, Eia Asen, Mary Target, Neil Dawson and Rabia Malik) of the theory of mentalization and practices of mentalization-based treatment to address the needs of chaotic, complex and multiply comorbid youth, via team-based (predominantly outreach) multimodal practices.

Previously called "adolescent mentalization-based integrative treatment", AMBIT changed its name to "adaptive..." in recognition of the fact that it is now being used by a wide range of teams across the UK and internationally, that extend beyond the adolescent age range (adults with severe and enduring relational difficulties, families with children where there are safeguarding concerns, young adults, etc.) Adaptation is also at the heart of AMBIT, which encourages local teams to adapt, build upon, and share these adaptations to its core components; AMBIT aspires to be an Open-source model of therapy innovation. This name change was recognised in the recent book published by Oxford University Press

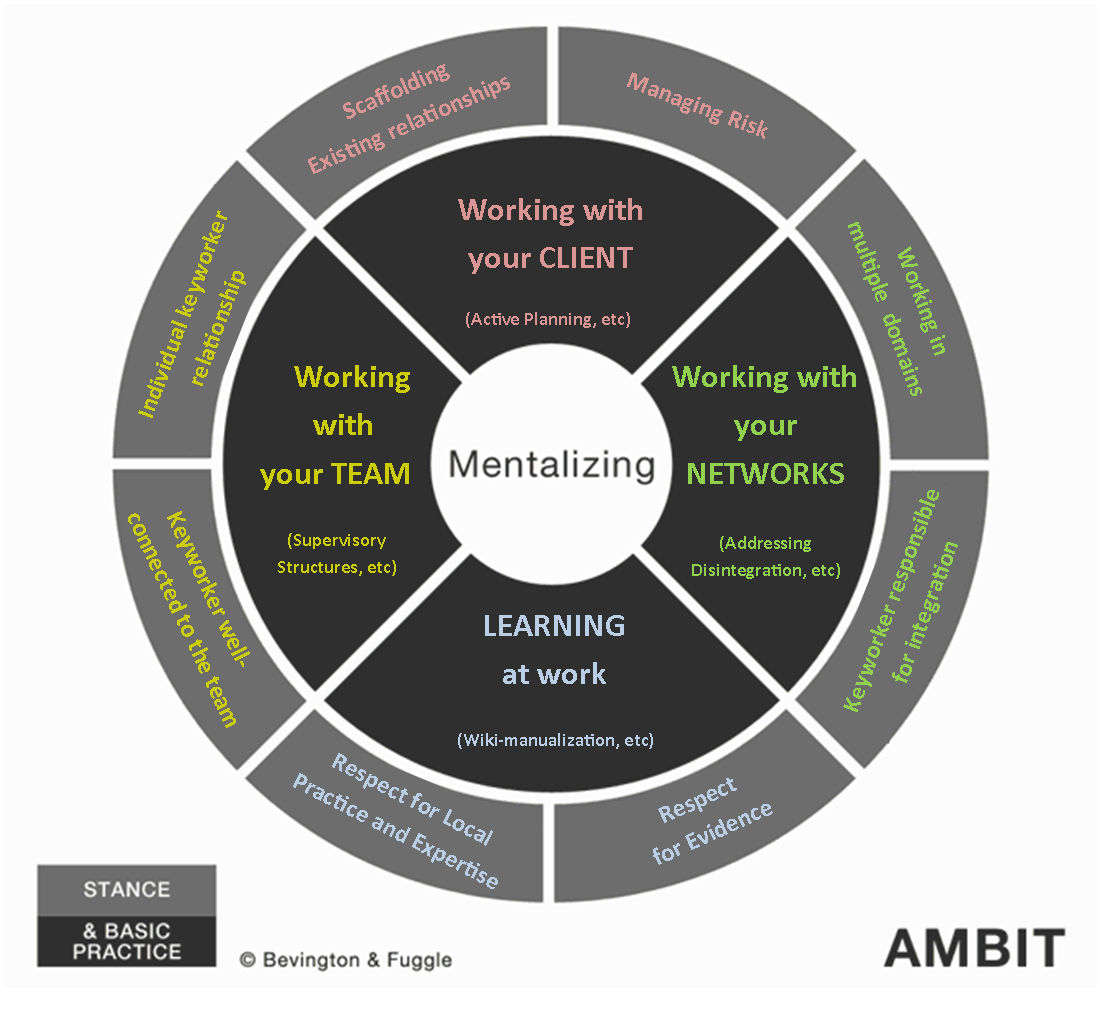
AMBIT stance and basic practices

These practices, shaped by an eightfold principled therapeutic stance and using mentalization as the integrating framework, balance the development of a strong therapeutic attachment to a key worker with strong peer-to-peer relationships between workers that are designed counteract the potential for destabilizing effects from such intense work.

Mentalization is applied and fostered explicitly in four directions in AMBIT:

- Towards the young person and their family/carers.
- Towards colleagues and peers at the level of the team.
- Towards the wider multi-agency network.

In addition, a range of manualized 'barefoot' adaptations of existing evidence-based treatment modalities are available to workers, but the approach also encourages the development of a culture of team-based reflection upon practice and outcomes, of learning, and of sharing. This has much in common with the notion of a "learning organisation" stance (see the work of Peter Senge) within local teams, but AMBIT includes the promotion of constrained and disciplined approaches to the local adaptation of each team's own wiki-based practice manual. These wikis come to represent specific local implementations that offer a "fit" for local cultures and service ecologies. The collaborative disciplines around their adaptation is a practice referred to as "manualization"; manualization is seen as analogous to mentalization at the level of the team (making sense of "why we practice in this way in that kind of situation", and broadcasting this transparently, with a view to improving this current understanding through feedback.)

== Treatment manual ==
AMBIT deploys an open-source wiki-based approach to treatment manualization based on TiddlyWiki; a server-side hosting platform allows multiple teams to develop their own locally adapted versions, each drawing on a shared common core of AMBIT material. Drawing on developments in programming, the authors have described the approach as an "open source approach to therapy".

== Implementations ==
As at March 2018, approximately 200 teams around the UK and internationally have been trained in AMBIT by the AMBIT program based at the Anna Freud National Centre for Children and Families charity in London. Encouraging early outcomes evaluative evidence has been published, but as a novel approach there are as yet no completed randomised controlled trials.

== Independent reviews, awards and sponsors ==
AMBIT is described in a number of independent reviews, including a 2018 review on "Psychotherapeutic interventions and contemporary developments: common and specific factors" in the BJPsych Advances journal. It is described in Chapter 42 of the 3rd edition of "Child Psychology and Psychiatry Frameworks for Clnical Training and Practice and in a review by the Youth Justice Working Group (2012), the Centre for Mental Health, 2010. and in a literature review on integrative psychotherapy for children and adolescents by Krueger and Glass.

The AMBIT Collaboration was awarded the "Innovation Nation" award for Innovation in Collaboration from The Guardian newspaper and Virgin Business Media in 2012.

AMBIT has been supported by grants from Comic Relief, the City Bridge Trust and the James Wentworth Stanley Memorial Fund.
