= Otto Weininger Memorial Award =

The Otto Weininger Memorial Award for lifetime achievement is given annually by the Canadian Psychological Association Psychoanalytic Section to a psychoanalytic or psychodynamic psychologist who has demonstrated outstanding clinical, empirical, or theoretical contributions in the areas of psychoanalytic or psychodynamic psychology.

== History of Award ==
The award was first given in 2005 and named after the child psychologist Otto Weininger (1929–2003).

== Recipients of the award ==
- 2015 Jon Mills
- 2014 Roger Frie
- 2013 Josh Levy
- 2012 Jonathan Shedler
- 2011 Morris Eagle
- 2010 Brent Willock
- 2009 Polly Young-Eisendrath
- 2008 Bruce Fink
- 2007 Nancy McWilliams
- 2006 Sidney Blatt
- 2005 Peter Fonagy

== See also ==
- List of psychology awards
- List of awards named after people
