= Polly Young-Eisendrath =

American psychologist and author (born 1947)

Polly Young-Eisendrath (born 1947) is an American psychologist and author. She is the founder of Dialogue Therapy and Real Dialogue and creator of the podcast Enemies: From War to Wisdom.

She has been a featured speaker at the Aspen Ideas Festival, TED-X, and is the recipient of the Otto Weininger Award for Lifetime Achievement in Psychoanalysis. Young-Eisendrath is the originator of Dialogue Therapy, designed to help couples and others transform chronic conflict into greater closeness and development. In 1983, she and her late husband, Ed Epstein, designed Dialogue Therapy as a new form of couples therapy that combined psychoanalysis, Jungian theory, psychodrama, and gender theory. She has published two books on Dialogue Therapy (1984 and 1993), detailing its theory and methods for clinicians and the general public. She has now re-visioned and updated Dialogue Therapy to include the distinctive combination of psychodrama, Object Relations, and Mindfulness. In 2019, Shambhala Publications released Love Between Equals: Relationship as a Spiritual Path, a book that offers her vision of personal love as a spiritual path and draws on her experience of 30 years as a Dialogue Therapist and Jungian analyst. In September, 2021 Routledge released Dialogue Therapy for Couples and Real Dialogue for Opposing Sides: Methods Based on Psychoanalysis and Mindfulness. She maintains a clinical practice of Jungian analytic psychotherapy and psychoanalysis in Vermont, United States.

== Life and career ==
Raised as a Catholic, Polly Young-Eisendrath was born and grew up in Akron, Ohio, where she graduated first in her class from Akron East High School. As a teenager, she worked as a long-distance telephone operator.

Young-Eisendrath attended Ohio University where she met, among other scholars, Huston Smith. Smith's work in comparative religions had a profound and transformative influence on her, leading her to search for a religion that was not fundamentally ritualistic or dogmatic, but experiential and connected with daily life.

== Buddhism ==
Young-Eisendrath began Zen training in 1970 at the Rochester Zen Center with Philip Kapleau. She became a student of Shinzen Young in 1998. She is currently a Mindfulness and Dharma teacher in the tradition of Shinzen Young, and practices both Soto Zen and Vipassanā, and has also practiced Phowa with Ayang Rinpoche and Anyen Rinpoche. She directs Waysmeet Sangha, a friendship-based Buddhist sangha, which she hosts in Vermont.

== Education and career ==
Young-Eisendrath attended Ohio University (OU) from 1965 to 1970 and graduated with a major in English literature. While at Ohio University, she was an Ohio Fellow and a student in the Honors College. She earned a Masters of Arts from Goddard College, a Masters of Social Work in clinical social work and a Ph.D. in developmental and counseling psychology from Washington University in St. Louis.

She is a diplomate Jungian analyst and completed her training through the Inter-Regional Society of Jungian Analysts. She has maintained an independent clinical practice as a psychologist since 1982: in Pennsylvania from 1982 to 1994 and in Vermont since 1992. She has been a clinical associate professor in Psychiatry at the University of Vermont Medical College since 1994 and is a clinical supervisor at the Norwich University Counseling Service.

A prolific writer, Young-Eisendrath has published 19 books and numerous academic articles. She is influential in the fields of Jungian analysis, feminist psychology, and the application of Zen Buddhist concepts to psychoanalytic theory. Translated into 12 languages, her books have been characterized as "scholarly and thoughtful, yet totally accessible", and "incisive, persuasive, practical and wise".

With her late husband, Ed Epstein, she created Dialogue Therapy for Couples, a time-limited couples therapy done by one or two therapists, designed to help couples to handle their conflicts respectfully through the use of a combination of psychoanalysis, mindfulness and psychodrama. Epstein died of Alzheimer's disease in 2014 and Young-Eisendrath's memoir of the experience narrates the process of the disease from the lens of a practicing Buddhist, offering insight into methods of coping with loss, death and grief.

Young-Eisendrath is the director of the Mustard Seed Project: Research and Application of a Buddhist Model for Transforming Loss and Bereavement, and the founder and director of Enlightening Conversations: Psychoanalysts and Buddhist Teachers Talking about Enlightenment and Awakening, which was described by Mark Matousek in Psychology Today as "fascinating, potentially life-changing".

== Bibliography ==
- O’Connor, Kevin. Books: What One Vermonter Found When Her Husband Lost His Memory. Seven Days. 18 Feb. 2015. Web. 27 Oct. 2016
- Rice, Rebecca. The 9 secrets of happy couples. Redbook Feb. 1997: 92+. PowerSearch. Web. 27 Oct. 2016
- Are you kidding? Maclean's 10 Nov. 2008: 10. PowerSearch. Web. 27 Oct. 2016.
- Herman, Bethany. Is envy getting the best of you? Nowadays, people divulge tons of private life details. But TMI can create covetous feelings that wreak havoc on self-esteem. Cosmopolitan Nov. 2008: 170+. PowerSearch. Web. 27 Oct. 2016.
- Satow, Roberta. Review: Female Authority: Empowering Women through Psychotherapy by Polly Young-Eisendrath, Florence Wiedemann. Gender and Society 5, no. 1 (1991): 134-38
- Smith, Roger. Review: The Cambridge Companion to Jung by Polly Young-Eisendrath, Terence Dawson The British Journal for the History of Science 32, no. 3 (1999): 377-78

== Published works ==
- Young-Eisendrath, P. (2021). Dialogue Therapy for Couples and Real Dialogue for Opposing Sides: Methods Based on Psychoanalysis and Mindfulness. London, England: Routledge.
- Young-Eisendrath, P. (2019). Love Between Equals: Relationship as a Spiritual Path. Boulder, CO: Shambhala Publications.
- Young-Eisendrath, P. & Hill, D. (under contract). Enlightenment and Idealization: Views from Buddhism and Psychoanalysis. London, England: Routledge.
- Young-Eisendrath, P. (2014). The Present Heart: A Memoir of Love, Loss and Discovery. – September 2, 2008. Emmaus, PA: Rodale Press.
- Young-Eisendrath, P. (2011) Over 60 and Looking for Love: Why Not? The desire for intimate love never dies Psychology Today, Posted Nov 17, 2011
- Young-Eisendrath, P. (2008). The Self-Esteem Trap: Raising Confident and Compassionate Kids in an Age of Self-Importance. New York, NY: Little, Brown.
- Young-Eisendrath, P. and Dawson, T. (Eds.) (2008). The Cambridge Companion to Jung: New and Revised. Cambridge, England: Cambridge University Press.
- Young-Eisendrath, P. (2004). Subject to Change: Jung, Gender, and Subjectivity in Psychoanalysis. London, England: Routledge.
- Young-Eisendrath, P. and Muramoto, S. (Eds.), (2002). Awakening and Insight: Zen Buddhism and Psychotherapy. London, England: Routledge.
- Young-Eisendrath, P. and Miller, M. (Eds.), (2000). The Psychology of Mature Spirituality: Integrity, Wisdom, Transcendence. London, England: Routledge.
- Young-Eisendrath, P. (1999). Women and Desire: Beyond Wanting to be Wanted. New York: Harmony Books.
- Young-Eisendrath, P. (1997). Gender and Desire: Uncursing Pandora. College Station, TX: Texas A&M University Press.
- Young-Eisendrath, P. (1997). The Resilient Spirit: Transforming Suffering into Insight, Compassion and Renewal. Reading, MA: Addison-Wesley, Longman. (Previously entitled The Gifts of Suffering in hardcover.
- Young-Eisendrath, P. and Dawson, T. (Eds.), (1997). The Cambridge Companion to Jung. Cambridge, England: Cambridge University Press.
- Kapleau, P. (1997) Awakening to Zen: Teachings of Roshi Philip Kapleau. P. Young-Eisendrath and R. Martin, (Eds.) New York: Scribners. (Paperback by Shambala Press)
- Young-Eisendrath, P. (1993). You’re Not What I Expected: Learning to Love the Opposite Sex. New York: William Morrow. (Re-issued by Fromm International Press, 1997).
- Young-Eisendrath, P. and Hall, J. (1991). Jung's Self Psychology: A Constructivist Perspective. New York: Guilford.
- Young-Eisendrath, P. and Wiedemann, F. (1987). Female Authority: Empowering Women Through Psychotherapy. New York: Guilford.
- Young-Eisendrath, P. and Hall, J. (Eds.) (1987). The Book of the Self: Person, Pretext, Process. New York: New York University Press.
- Young-Eisendrath, P. (1984). Hags and Heroes: A Feminist Approach to Jungian Psychotherapy with Couples. Toronto: Inner City Publications.
