= Mentalization-based treatment =

Form of psychotherapy

Mentalization-based treatment or Mentalization-based therapy (MBT) is an integrative form of psychotherapy, bringing together aspects of psychodynamic, cognitive-behavioral, systemic and ecological approaches. MBT was developed and manualised by Peter Fonagy and Anthony Bateman, designed for individuals with borderline personality disorder (BPD). Some of these individuals suffer from disorganized attachment and failed to develop a robust mentalization capacity. Fonagy and Bateman define mentalization as the process by which we implicitly and explicitly interpret the actions of oneself and others as meaningful on the basis of intentional mental states. An alternative and simpler definition is "Seeing others from the inside and ourselves from the outside." The object of treatment is that patients with BPD increase their mentalization capacity, which should improve affect regulation, thereby reducing suicidality and self-harm, as well as strengthening interpersonal relationships. A version of MBT has also been developed for individuals with antisocial personality disorder (MBT-ASPD), delivered primarily in a group setting. Because individuals with ASPD are more likely to engage and learn from peers they perceive as similar, the focus of MBT-ASPD is on facilitating constructive group interactions that support mentalizing and behavioral change.

More recently, a range of mentalization-based treatments, using the "mentalizing stance" defined in MBT but directed at children (MBT-C), families (MBT-F) and adolescents (MBT-A), and for chaotic multi-problem youth, AMBIT (adaptive mentalization-based integrative treatment) has been under development by groups mainly gravitating around the Anna Freud National Centre for Children and Families. Moreover, the MBT model has been used in treating patients with eating disorders (MBT-ED)

The treatment should be distinguished from and has no connection with mindfulness-based stress reduction (MBSR) therapy developed by Jon Kabat-Zinn.

== Goals ==
The major goals of MBT are:

- better behavioral control
- increased affect regulation
- more intimate and gratifying relationships
- the ability to pursue life goals

This is believed to be accomplished through increasing the patient's capacity for mentalization in order to stabilize the client's sense of self and to enhance stability in emotions and relationships.

== Focus of treatment ==
A distinctive feature of MBT is placing the enhancement of mentalizing itself as focus of treatment. The aim of therapy is not developing insight, but the recovery of mentalizing. Therapy examines mainly the present moment, attending to events of the past only insofar as they affect the individual in the present. Other core aspects of treatment include a stance of curiosity, partnership with the patient rather than an 'expert' type role, monitoring and regulating emotional arousal, and identifying the affect focus. Transference is not included in the MBT model. MBT does encourage consideration of the patient-therapist relationship, but without necessarily generalizing to other relationships, past or present.

== Treatment procedure ==
MBT should be offered to patients twice per week with sessions alternating between group therapy and individual treatment. During sessions the therapist works to stimulate or nurture mentalizing. Particular techniques are employed to lower or raise emotional arousal as needed, to interrupt non-mentalizing and to foster flexibility in perspective-taking. Activation occurs through the elaboration of current attachment relationships, the therapist's encouragement and regulation of the patient's attachment bond with the therapist and the therapist's attempts to create attachment bonds between members of the therapy group.

== Mechanisms of change ==
The safe attachment relationship with the therapist provides a relational context in which it is safe for the patient to explore the mind of the other. Fonagy and Bateman have recently proposed that MBT (and other evidence-based therapies) works by providing ostensive cues that stimulate epistemic trust. The increase in epistemic trust, together with a persistent focus on mentalizing in therapy, appear to facilitate change by leaving people more open to learning outside of therapy, in the social interactions of their day-to-day lives.

== Efficacy ==
Fonagy, Bateman, and colleagues have done extensive outcome research on MBT for borderline personality disorder. The first randomized, controlled trial was published in 1999, concerning MBT delivered in a partial hospital setting. The results showed real-world clinical effectiveness that compared favorably with existing treatments for BPD. A follow-up study published in 2003 demonstrated that MBT is cost-effective. Encouraging results were also found in an 18-month study, in which subjects were randomly assigned to an outpatient MBT treatment condition versus a structured clinical management (SCM) treatment. The lasting efficacy of MBT was demonstrated in an 8-year follow-up of patients from the original trial, comparing MBT versus treatment as usual. In that research, patients who had received MBT had less medication use, fewer hospitalizations and longer periods of employment compared to patients who received standard care. Replication studies have been published by other European investigators. Researchers have also demonstrated the effectiveness of MBT for adolescents as well as that of a group-only format of MBT.
