= Jon Mills (psychologist) =

Canadian philosopher and psychologist

Academic background
- Education: Vanderbilt University (PhD)
- Thesis: The Unconscious Abyss: Hegel's Anticipation of Psychoanalysis (1999)
- Doctoral advisor: John Lachs, Jay Bernstein, John Burbidge
- Other advisor: Leslie Green

Academic work
- Era: Contemporary philosophy
- Region: Western philosophy
- School or tradition: Psychoanalysis
- Website: https://www.philosophypsychoanalysis.com/

Jon Mills is a Canadian philosopher, psychoanalyst, and clinical psychologist. His principle theoretical contributions have been in the philosophy of the unconscious, a critique of psychoanalysis, philosophical psychology, value inquiry, and the philosophy of culture. His clinical contributions are in the areas of attachment pathology, trauma, psychosis, and psychic structure.

== Academia and Clinical Credentials ==
Mills is Honorary Professor and an international member of the Comparative Psychoanalysis Research Group, Department of Psychosocial & Psychoanalytic Studies, University of Essex, UK, is on Faculty in the Postgraduate Programs in Psychoanalysis & Psychotherapy, Gordon F. Derner School of Psychology, Adelphi University, USA, Faculty and Supervising Analyst at the New School for Existential Psychoanalysis, USA; and is Emeritus Professor of Psychology & Psychoanalysis at Adler Graduate Professional School in Toronto. He was the founding senior partner and chief psychologist of a mental health corporation in Ontario, Canada before he retired from clinical practice. He earned his PhD in philosophy from Vanderbilt University, his PsyD in clinical psychology from the Illinois School of Professional Psychology-Chicago, and was a Fulbright scholar in the Departments of Philosophy at the University of Toronto and York University. He is a Diplomate, Fellow, and is board certified in Psychoanalysis and Clinical Psychology with the American Board of Professional Psychology, and is a retired psychologist with the College of Psychologists of Ontario.

== Awards ==
Mills has been referred to as “an independent and serious thinker,” "a focused and iconoclastic scholar," and "one of the most scholarly psychoanalytic thinkers of our time." In 2008 he received a Significant Contribution to Canadian Psychology Award, won a Goethe Award in 2013 for best book, and was the 2015 recipient of the Otto Weininger Memorial Award for lifetime achievement from the Section on Psychoanalysis and Psychodynamic Psychology of the Canadian Psychological Association. In 2006, 2011, 2013, 2018, and 2022, Mills also won a Gradiva Award for his scholarship given by the National Association for the Advancement of Psychoanalysis in New York City, which has been the most times and in more categories than any other recipient in the history of the prize including best article twice, book, edited book, and TV series, The Talking Cure.

== Philosophy of the Unconscious ==
In his books, The Unconscious Abyss and Origins, Mills develops a psychoanalytic metaphysics called “dialectical psychoanalysis” or “process psychology” based on neo-Hegelian principles, which places the unconscious at the heart of all psychic activity. He argues that the mind is ontologically constituted through unconscious genesis, and that subjectivity is conditioned a priori by unconscious agency, which is responsible for all forms of mental life to transpire, including higher modes of consciousness, contrary to contemporary views in the philosophy of mind that place causal primacy on consciousness. Rather than demote the mind to biological reductionism, unconscious processes are conceived as a series of psychic spacings that instantiate themselves through a multitude of schemata, which are the building blocks of psychic reality. He makes the controversial claim that unconscious semiotics, condition and underlie the structure and function of language, subjectivity, and social dynamics.

== Critique of Contemporary Psychoanalysis ==
Mills is one of the first psychoanalysts who is also a philosopher and critic of various theoretical schools in the history of the psychoanalytic movement, which is exemplified in his book, Underworlds. Mills also offered the first sustained philosophical critique of contemporary psychoanalysis in his book, Conundrums, which examines and scrutinizes relational, intersubjective, and postmodern perspectives in the field. He has been referred to as “the most important and profound spokesman to critique the relational psychoanalytic movement.” In 2015, an international conference was held in Israel on his work titled, The Relational Approach and its Critics: A Conference with Dr. Jon Mills, which was sponsored by the Israeli Forum of the International Association for Relational Psychoanalysis and Psychotherapy and the Department of Hermeneutics and Cultural Studies at Bar-Ilan University. The conference proceedings were published in the journal, Psychoanalytic Perspectives, which later appeared in his book, Debating Relational Psychoanalysis: Jon Mills and his Critics.

== Books and Reviews ==
- Mills, Jon (2024). End of the World: Civilization and Its Fate. Lanham, MD: Rowman & Littlefield.
- Mills, Jon & Goodwyn, Erik (2023). Archetypal Ontology: New Directions in Analytical Psychology. London: Routledge.
- Mills, Jon & Burston, Daniel (Eds.) (2023). Critical Theory and Psychoanalysis: From the Frankfurt School to Contemporary Critique. London: Routledge.
- Mills, Jon (2022). Psyche, Culture, World: Excursions in Existentialism and Psychoanalytic Philosophy. London: Routledge.
- Mills, Jon (2022). Inventando a Dios: Psicología de la creencia y el auge de la espiritualidad secular. Manuel Abraham Paz y Miño Conde (Trans.). Lima, Peru: Humanistas Racionalistas del Perú (HURA-PERÚ) y Ediciones de Filosofía Aplicada.
- Mills, Jon (Ed.) (2022). Psychoanalysis and the Mind-Body Problem. London: Routledge.
- Govrin, Aner, Mills, Jon, & Naso, Ronald C. (Eds.) (2022). The Emerging Role of Interdisciplinarity in Clinical Psychoanalysis. Lausanne: Frontiers Media SA. doi: 10.3389/978-2-88974-215-8
- Mills, Jon (Ed.) (2021). Analytical Psychology and the Human Sciences. London: Routledge.
- Naso, Ronald C. & Jon Mills (Eds.) (2021). Object and Desire: Psychoanalytic Explorations. London: Routledge.
- Mills, Jon (2020). Debating Relational Psychoanalysis: Jon Mills and his Critics. London: Routledge.
- Govrin, Aner & Jon Mills (Eds.) (2020). Innovations in Psychoanalysis: Originality, Development, Progress. London: Routledge.
- Naso, Ronald C. & Jon Mills (Eds.) (2020). Psychoanalysis Among Competing Schools: Identity in Difference. London: Routledge.
- Mills, Jon (2019). Jung and Philosophy. London: Routledge.
- Naso, Ronald C. & Jon Mills (Eds). (2019). Psychoanalytic Plurality in Theory and Praxis: Clinical Horizons. London: Routledge.
- Mills, Jon & David L. Downing (Eds.) (2018). Lacan on Psychosis: From Theory to Praxis. London: Routledge.
- Naso, Ronald C. & Jon Mills (Eds.) (2018). Comparative Psychoanalysis: Reshaping the Psychoanalytic Domain. London: Routledge.
- Downing, David L., & Jon Mills (Eds.) (2017). Outpatient Treatment of Psychosis: A Psychodynamic Approach to Evidence-Based Practice. London: Karnac.
- Merkur, Dan & Jon Mills (2017). Jung’s Ethics: Moral Psychology and his Cure of Souls. London: Routledge.
- Mills, Jon (2017). Inventing God: Psychology of Belief and the Rise of Secular Spirituality. London: Routledge.
- Naso, Ronald C. & Jon Mills (Eds.) (2016). Ethics of Evil: Psychoanalytic Investigations. London: Karnac.
- Naso, Ronald C. & Jon Mills (Eds.) (2016). Humanizing Evil: Psychoanalytic, Philosophical, & Clinical Perspectives. London: Routledge.
- Mills, Jon (2014). Underworlds: Philosophies of the Unconscious from Psychoanalysis to Metaphysics. London: Routledge
- Mills, Jon (2013). L'inconscient et son lieu. Genèse de la réalité psychique. Montreal: Éditions Liber
- Mills, Jon (2012). When God Wept (a novel). Washington, DC: The Humanist Press.
- Mills, Jon (2012). Conundrums: A Critique of Contemporary Psychoanalysis. New York: Routledge.
- Mills, Jon (2010). Origins: On the Genesis of Psychic Reality. Montreal: McGill-Queens University Press.
- Mills, Jon (Ed.) (2006). Other Banalities: Melanie Klein Revisited. London: Routledge.
- Mills, Jon. (2005). Treating Attachment Pathology. Lanham, MD: Aronson/Rowman & Littlefield.
- Mills, Jon (Ed.) (2005). Relational and Intersubjective Perspectives in Psychoanalysis: A Critique. Lanham, MD: Aronson/Rowman & Littlefield.
- Mills, Jon (Ed.) (2004). Psychoanalysis at the Limit: Epistemology, Mind, and the Question of Science. Albany: SUNY Press.
- Mills, Jon (Ed.) (2004). Rereading Freud: Psychoanalysis through Philosophy. Albany: SUNY Press.
- Mills, Jon (2002). The Unconscious Abyss: Hegel's Anticipation of Psychoanalysis. Albany: SUNY Press.
- Mills, Jon, (Ed.) (2002). A Pedagogy of Becoming. Amsterdam/New York: Rodopi.
- Mills, Jon, (Ed.) (1999). The Human Aspect: Selected Works in Psychoanalysis, Behaviorism, and Existential Phenomenology. Long Beach, NY: Whittier.
- Mills, Jon & Janusz A. Polanowski (1997). The Ontology of Prejudice. Amsterdam/Atlanta: Rodopi.
