= Psychic equivalence =

Non-normative mind-state

Psychic equivalence describes a mind-state where no distinction is drawn between the contents of the mind and the external world – where what is thought in the mind is assumed to be automatically true.

== Origins ==
Psychic equivalence is a primitive mind-state which precedes in infancy the capacity for mentalization, that is, for reflection upon both inner and outer worlds. In psychic equivalence mode, if the child thinks there is a monster in the closet it believes there really is a monster in the closet; if the inner world feels harmonious, the world outside is also harmonious. Psychic equivalence is thus a form of concrete understanding of the world, self-convinced, that blocks all curiosity about alternative mind-views.

== In later life ==
Psychic equivalence reappears in later life in the course of dreams, delusions, and traumatic flashbacks. It involves a temporary loss of awareness of the difference between external reality and the contents of the mind: thus in post traumatic stress disorder the individual is convinced (perhaps years later) they are actually back in the situation of the original trauma, a complete loss of perspective.

Where a defensive false self has been built up since infancy to defend against the anxieties of psychic equivalence, subsequent collapse of the narcissistic structure can lead to the re-emergence of the terrifying impingement by reality of psychic equivalence.

== See also ==
- Delirium
- Ego loss
- Limit-experience
- Magical thinking
- Oceanic feeling
- Symbolic equation
- Wish fulfillment
