= Karen Bakker =

Canadian academic (1971–2023)

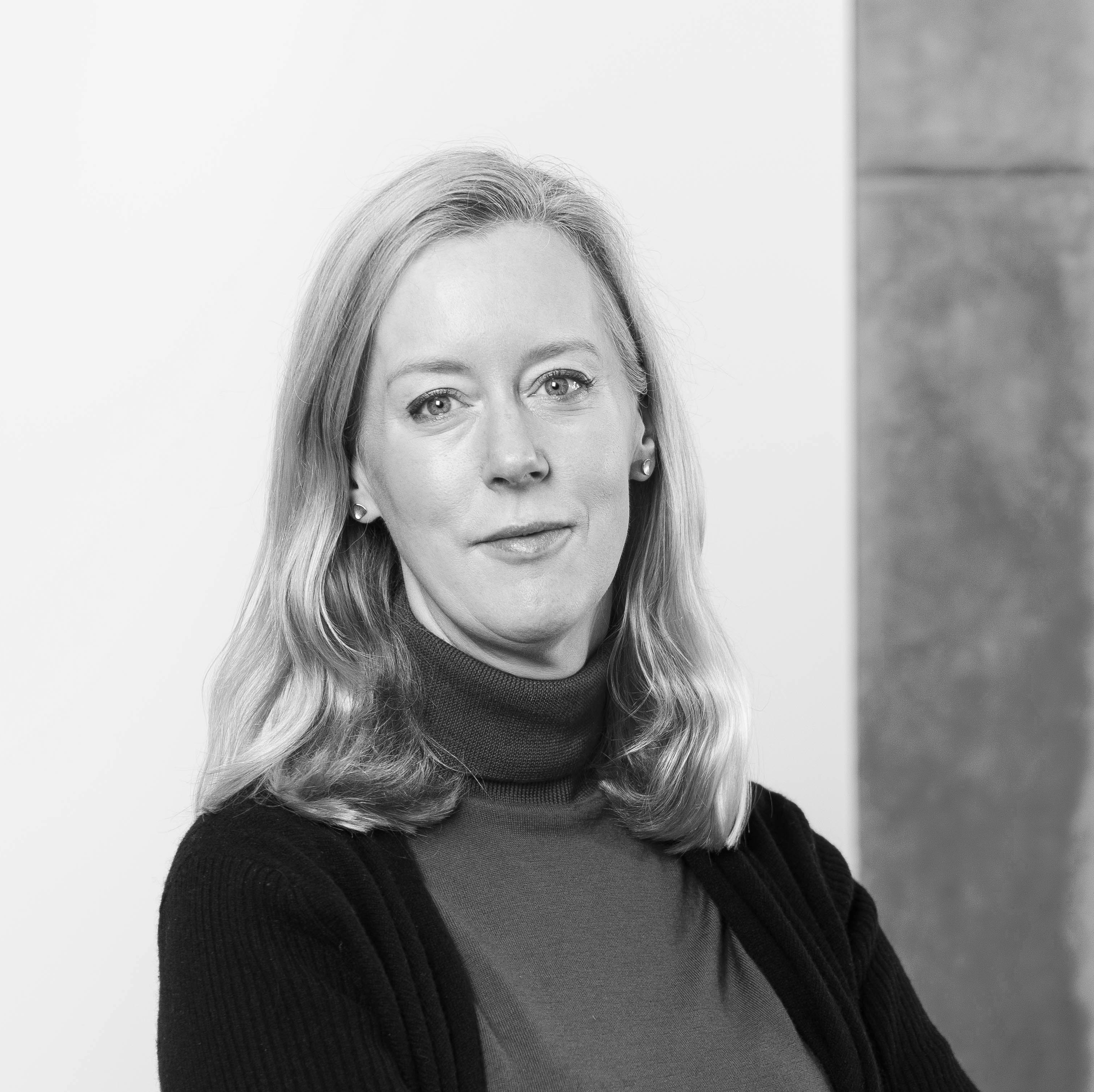
- Bakker in 2018
- Born: 6 December 1971; Montreal, Canada
- Died: 14 August 2023 (aged 51); Vancouver, Canada
- Education: McMaster University, Oxford University
- Occupations: Author, professor, researcher
- Writing career
- Language: English, French, Spanish
- Subjects: Digital transformation, environmental governance, sustainability, water
- Notable awards: Rhodes Scholarship, Guggenheim Fellowship, Annenberg Fellowship in Communication at the Center for Advanced Study in the Behavioral Sciences (Stanford), Trudeau Foundation Fellowship, Harvard Radcliffe Institute Fellowship
- Website: https://geog.ubc.ca/profile/karen-jessica-bakker/

Karen Bakker (6 December 1971 – 14 August 2023) was a Canadian author, researcher, and entrepreneur known for her work on digital transformation, environmental governance, and sustainability. A Rhodes Scholar with a DPhil from Oxford, Bakker was a professor at the University of British Columbia. In 2022–2023 she was on sabbatical leave at Harvard, as a Harvard Radcliffe Institute Fellow. She was the recipient of numerous awards, including a Guggenheim Fellowship, Stanford University's Annenberg Fellowship in Communication, Canada's "Top 40 Under 40", and a Trudeau Foundation Fellowship.

Bakker's research focused on the intersection of digital technologies and environmental governance, digital environmental humanities, digital geographies, political ecology, and political economy. In the early part of her career, she focused on water and climate issues. Later, she concentrated on digital technology and environmental futures studies as critical yet pragmatic projects aiming to advance regenerative sustainability and environmental justice.

== Career ==
Bakker was born in Montreal and raised in Ottawa. She trained in both the natural and social sciences at McMaster University (a combined Bachelor of Arts and Science (minor in Physics), followed by a DPhil in geography at the University of Oxford). She published over 100 academic publications, including seven sole-authored and edited scholarly books. Her work has been cited over 20,000 times.

She also served as a policy advisor to organizations at the forefront of digital innovation on environmental issues, including the Digital Research Alliance of Canada, Future Earth, Sustainability in a Digital Age, and the International Institute for Sustainable Development. Her advisory roles have also included the IPCC, National Round Table on Environment and Economy, OECD, UNDP, UNEP, UNESCO, and OHCHR.

Bakker was a member of the Decolonizing Water research collective and the Riverhood project team (funded by the EU), as well as the Coalition on Digital Environmental Sustainability, and the Policy Network on Environment of the Internet Governance Forum. She was also a board member of the National Research Council Canada, and a member of the editorial board of Global Environmental Change.

Bakker delivered over 200 conference presentations and invited lectures over the course of her career, at academic institutions such as Berkeley, Harvard, Stanford, and UCLA. These span several disciplines including geography and environmental studies, computer science, urban studies, labour studies, political ecology, and political economy.

=== Digital transformation and sustainability: The Smart Earth Project ===
Bakker's Smart Earth project engaged with two of the most destabilizing, controversial trends of our time: digital transformation and global environmental change.

Smart Earth brings together researchers, educators, and policymakers to study environmental knowledge and seeks to better understand the complex relationships between humans and nature. This project was launched with a meta-review of a smart technologies database in 2018. Bakker curated a website with learning tools regarding digital technologies and their application to environmental issues, and has collaborated with the United Nations Environment Program to map out a roadmap for international action on digital transformation and sustainability.

=== Interspecies communication and bioacoustics: The Sounds of Life ===
Bakker worked at the intersection of data and sustainability, exploring how technology can be leveraged to better protect, understand, cohabitate, and perhaps even communicate with our non-human counterparts. Bakker wrote critically about the potential pitfalls of the digital listening agenda, comparing it to an environmental variant of surveillance capitalism.

In October 2022, Bakker published her book: The Sounds of Life: How Digital Technology is Bringing Us Closer to the Worlds of Animals and Plants (Princeton University Press). The book was chosen as the NPR Science Friday Book Club book of the month for November 2022, selected as one of Malcolm Gladwell's Next Big Idea Club nominees in October 2022, and received both popular and critical acclaim, including a review in Science, which described the book as "thoughtful and rigorous…meticulously researched and colorfully presented…in a way that is accessible to non-experts. A wonderful mix of animal ecology, narratives of science-doing, futurism, and accounts of Indigenous knowledge that is as interdisciplinary as the field itself." She was invited to present the book at Google Talks, Aspen Ideas Festival and was the opening keynote at the TED 2023 conference.

=== Water governance ===
Bakker also worked broadly on issues of water accessibility, governance, and policy. Her publications include Privatizing Water: Governance Failure and the World's Urban Water Crisis (Cornell University Press), An Uncooperative Commodity: Privatizing Water in England and Wales (Oxford University Press), "Neoliberalizing Nature? Market Environmentalism in Water Supply in England and Wales" (2005), and "Water security: Debating an emerging paradigm" (2012). The Privatizing Water book was awarded the Urban Affairs Association Book Award (2011; honourable mention) and the Rik Davidson/Studies in Political Economy Book Prize (2012).

=== As Karen Le Billon ===
Writing under her nom de plume, Karen Le Billon, Bakker wrote two popular science books on children, food, and families. French Kids Eat Everything (HarperCollins, 2012) was published in 15 countries and 12 languages, awarded the Taste Canada Food Writing Award in 2013, and widely featured in the press, including The New York Times, The Guardian, and The Sunday Times. The follow up book Getting To Yum: The 7 Secrets Of Raising Eager Eaters (HarperCollins, 2014) was also well received by experts and the public.

=== Death ===
Bakker died after a brief illness on 14 August 2023.

== Notable works ==
=== Books ===
- Gaia's Web: How Digital Environmentalism Can Combat Climate Change, Restore Biodiversity, Cultivate Empathy, and Regenerate the Earth (Penguin Random House Canada, 2024)
- The Sounds of Life:: How Digital Technology is Bringing Us Closer to the Worlds of Animals and Plants (Princeton University Press, 2022) ISBN 978-0-691-20628-8.
- Water Teachings, K. Bakker and C. Crane (eds) (2020)
- Privatizing Water: Governance Failure and the World's Urban Water Crisis (Cornell University Press, 2010) ISBN 978-0-8014-6700-4.
- Eau Canada: The future of Canada's water (UBC Press, 2007) ISBN 978-0-7748-1339-6.
- An Uncooperative Commodity: Privatizing Water in England and Wales (Oxford University Press, 2004) ISBN 978-0-19-925365-4.

=== Chapters and Articles (Peer-Reviewed) ===
- Ritts, Max; Bakker, Karen (September 2018). "Smart Earth: A meta-review and implications for environmental governance". Global Environmental Change. 52: 201–211. Bibcode:2018GEC....52..201B. doi:10.1016/j.gloenvcha.2018.07.011. S2CID 158985965.
- Bakker, Karen; Bridge, Gavin (July 2021). Chapter 4: Material Worlds Redux: Mobilizing Materiality within Critical Resource Geography (1st ed.). Routledge. pp. 43–56. ISBN 978-1-138-35880-5.
- Ritts, Max; Bakker, Karen (August 2021). "Conservation acoustics: Animal sounds, audible natures, cheap nature". Geoforum. 124: 144–155. doi:10.1016/j.geoforum.2021.04.022. S2CID 237722043.
