= Elizabeth Danto =

Elizabeth Ann Danto
- Education: BA in anthropology (1973); Sarah Lawrence College; MSc in social work (1984); Columbia University; PhD in clinical social work (1996); New York University
- Occupation: Professor of Social Welfare Emeritus
- Employer(s): Hunter College, City University of New York

Elizabeth Ann Danto is professor emeritus of social welfare at Hunter College, City University of New York. She is the author of Freud's Free Clinics: Psychoanalysis & Social Justice, 1918-1938 (2005) which received both the Gradiva Award and the Goethe Prize, and Historical Research (2008). Dr. Danto writes and lectures internationally on the history of psychoanalysis as a system of thought and a marker of urban culture.

== Selected works ==
- ‘Theory Has Its Pleasures’ – The Work of Anna Freud [Anna Freud, A Teoria tem seus Prazeres] Editora Perspectiva (São Paulo), 2025
- Freud/Tiffany – Anna Freud, Dorothy Tiffany Burlingham and the ‘Best Possible School’ (co-edited with A. Steiner-Strauss) Routledge, History of Psychoanalysis Series, 2018
- Historical Research. Oxford University Press, 2008.
- Freud's Free Clinics: Psychoanalysis & Social Justice, 1918-1938. Columbia University Press, 2005. (paperback issued April 2007) Psicoanálisis y justicia social, 1918-1938: las clínicas gratuitas de Freud, Spanish edition by Editorial Gredos (Madrid) 2013/ As Clínicas Públicas De Freud: Psicanályse E Justiça Social, Brazilian edition by Editora Perspectiva (São Paulo) 2019
