= Mentalization =

Ability to understand mental state that underlies behavior

In psychology, mentalization is the ability to understand the mental state – of oneself or others – that underlies overt behaviour. Mentalization can be seen as a form of imaginative mental activity that allows individuals to perceive and interpret human behaviour in terms of intentional mental states (e.g., needs, desires, feelings, beliefs, goals, purposes, and reasons). It is sometimes described as "understanding misunderstanding." Another term that David Wallin, clinical psychologist with a focus on attachment theory, has used for mentalization is "Thinking about thinking". Mentalization can occur either automatically or consciously.

== Background ==
While the broader concept of theory of mind has been explored at least since Descartes, the specific term 'mentalization' emerged in psychoanalytic literature in the late 1960s, and began to be empirically tested in 1983 when Heinz Wimmer and Josef Perner ran the first experiment to investigate when children can understand false belief, inspired by Daniel Dennett's interpretation of a Punch and Judy scene.

The field diversified in the early 1990s when Simon Baron-Cohen and Uta Frith, building on the Wimmer and Perner study, and others merged it with research on the psychological and biological mechanisms underlying autism and schizophrenia. Concomitantly, Peter Fonagy and colleagues applied it to developmental psychopathology in the context of attachment relationships gone awry. More recently, several child mental health researchers such as Arietta Slade, John Grienenberger, Alicia Lieberman, Daniel Schechter, and Susan Coates have applied mentalization both to research on parenting and to clinical interventions with parents, infants, and young children.

== Implications ==
Mentalization has implications for attachment theory and self-development. According to Peter Fonagy, individuals with disorganized attachment style (e.g., due to physical, psychological, or sexual abuse) can have greater difficulty developing the ability to mentalize. Attachment history partially determines the strength of mentalizing capacity of individuals. Securely attached individuals tend to have had a primary caregiver that has more complex and sophisticated mentalizing abilities. As a consequence, these children possess more robust capacities to represent the states of their own and other people's minds. Early childhood exposure to mentalization can protect the individual from psychosocial adversity. This early childhood exposure to genuine parental mentalization fosters development of mentalizing capabilities in the child themselves. There is also suggestion that genuine parental mentalization is beneficial to child learning; when a child feels they are being viewed as an intentional agent, they feel contingently responded to, which promotes epistemic trust and triggers learning in the form of natural pedagogy - this increases the quality of learning in the child. This theory needs further empirical support.

== Research ==
Mentalization or better mentalizing, has a number of different facets which can be measured with various methods. A prominent method of assessment of Parental Mentalization is the Parental Development Interview (PDI), a 45-question semi-structured interview, investigating parents' representations of their children, themselves as parents, and their relationships with their children. An efficient self-report measure of Parental Mentalization is the Parental Reflective Functioning Questionnaire (PRFQ) created by Patrick Luyten and colleagues. The PRFQ is a brief, multidimensional assessment of parental reflective functioning (mentalization), aimed to be easy to administer to parents in a wide range of socioeconomic populations. The PRFQ is recommended for use as a screening tool for studies with large populations and does not aim to replace more comprehensive measures, such as the PDI or observer-based measures.

Mentalization, it has been increasingly underscored by Peter Fonagy and colleagues, may be a common factor in psychological treatment and results from a 2024 systematic review indicate the mentalization may be a mediator and moderator of mental health outcome across diagnosis and treatment approach although more studies are needed.

A 2024 study investigated the longitudinal impact of mentalizing on well-being and emotion regulation strategies in a non-clinical sample, finding that impairments in mentalizing negatively predicted well-being and positively predicted emotional suppression over one year. Research has also found a link between dopamine levels and the ability to mentalize. In particular, reducing dopamine activity in healthy individuals using the drug haloperidol impaired their mentalizing abilities, suggesting that dopamine plays a direct role in these social cognitive processes.

== Fourfold dimensions ==
According to the American Psychiatric Association's Handbook of Mentalizing in Mental Health Practice, mentalization takes place along a series of four parameters or dimensions: Automatic/Controlled, Self/Other, Inner/Outer, and Cognitive/Affective.

Each dimension can be exercised in either a balanced or unbalanced way, while effective mentalization also requires a balanced perspective across all four dimensions.

1. Automatic/Controlled. Automatic (or implicit) mentalizing is a fast-processing unreflective process, calling for little conscious effort or input; whereas controlled mentalization (explicit) is slow, effortful, and demanding of full awareness. In a balanced personality, shifts from automatic to controlled smoothly occur when misunderstandings arise in a conversation or social setting, to put things right. Inability to shift from automatic mentalization can lead to a simplistic, one-sided view of the world, especially when emotions run high; while conversely inability to leave controlled mentalization leaves one trapped in a 'heavy', endlessly ruminative thought-mode.
2. Self/Other involves the ability to mentalize about one's own state of mind, as well as about that of another. Lack of balance means an overemphasis on either self or other.
3. Inner/Outer: Here problems can arise from an over-emphasis on external conditions, and a neglect of one's own feelings and experience.
4. Cognitive/Affective are in balance when both dimensions are engaged, as opposed to either an excessive certainty about one's own one-sided ideas, or an overwhelming of thought by floods of emotion.

== See also ==
- Adaptive mentalization-based integrative treatment
- Mentalization based treatment
- Metacognition
- Psychic equivalence
- Social cognition

== Sources ==
- Allen, Jon G.; Fonagy, Peter, eds. (2006). Handbook of Mentalization-Based Treatment. doi:10.1002/9780470712986. ISBN 978-0-470-01560-5.
- Bateman, Anthony W.; Fonagy, Peter (2019). Handbook of Mentalizing in Mental Health Practice. American Psychiatric Pub. ISBN 978-1-61537-250-8.
- Fonagy, Peter; Gergely, Guörgy; Jurist, Elliot L.; Target, Mary (2018). Fonagy, Peter; Gergely, Gyorgy; Jurist, Elliot L. (eds.). Affect Regulation, Mentalization, and the Development of the Self. doi:10.4324/9780429471643. ISBN 978-0-429-47164-3.
- Oestergaard Hagelquist, Janne (2018). The Mentalization Guidebook. doi:10.4324/9780429482434. ISBN 978-0-429-90720-3.
