= Noel Castree =

British geographer

- Born: 2 April 1968 (age 57); Bury, Greater Manchester, UK
- Education: University of Oxford, (BA); University of British Columbia (MA, PhD)
- Occupations: Geographer at University of Technology Sydney & University of Manchester (Marxist political economy, political economy of nature)
- Years active: 1989–present

Noel Castree FAcSS (born 2 April 1968) is a British geographer whose research has focused on capitalism-environment relationships and, more recently, on the role that various experts play in discourses about global environmental change. He is the editor-in-chief of the peer-reviewed journal Progress in Human Geography.

== Background ==
Castree was born in Bury, Greater Manchester, UK and has a BA in Geography from the University of Oxford (1989), and an MA (1992) and PhD from the University of British Columbia (1999). He has worked at the universities of Liverpool and Wollongong, as well as Manchester and UTS (Sydney).

== Key contributions ==
His "principal interests are in the political economy of environmental change, regulation and contestation". He has sought to develop and apply Marxian approaches to understanding a range of environmental problems, with an emphasis on understanding the meaning and limits of 'commodification'.". One of his main intellectual contributions to the discipline of geography is advancing the concept of "social nature", which mediates between social constructivist and materialist perspectives on the biophysical world that people interact with; another is explaining the 'neoliberalisation of nature' in the context of 21st century carbon-intensive capitalism. His more recent research focuses on who gets to speak for the Earth and humanity in light of growing concerns about a global environmental crisis e.g. in a book called What Future For the Earth? (2026). He has served twice as a managing editor of peer review journals, once for Antipode and more recently for Progress in Human Geography. He is also the founding editor of Environment & Planning F: Philosophy, Theory, Models, Methods and Practice (Sage publishers, launched in 2021).

== Awards ==
He received a Governor General of Canada's Gold Medal while a graduate student at UBC. In 2005, he received the Gill Memorial Award from the Royal Geographical Society. In 2008 he chaired the RGS-IBG conference held in London. In 2012 he was made a Fellow of the British Academy of Social Science. In 2019 he won a lifetime achievement award from the publisher Taylor and Francis for the impact of his books, articles and chapters. In 2023 he received the Murchison Award from the Royal Geographical Society for 'influential research about the relations between societies and the physical environment'.

== Publications ==
Books Authored

- Castree, N. 2026. What Future For the Earth? Speaking For Planet and People in the Age of Consequences. London & New York: Routledge.
- Mahony, M. & Castree, N. 2026. The Anthropocene. London & New York: Routledge.
- Castree, N., Charnock, G. & Christophers, B. 2022. David Harvey: A Critical Introduction To His Thought. London & New York: Routledge.
- Castree, N. 2014. Making Sense of Nature. London and New York: Routledge.
- Castree, N., Kitchin, R & Rogers, A. 2013 Oxford Dictionary of Human Geography. Oxford: Oxford University Press.
- Castree, N. 2005. Nature. London: Routledge. Ch.1
- Castree, N., Coe N., K. Ward & M. Samers. 2004. Spaces of Work. London & Thousand Oaks: Sage.

Edited

- Castree, N., Barnes, T. J. & Salmond, J. (eds.) 2025. Making Geography Matter London: Routledge
- Castree, N., Hulme, M. & Proctor, J. (eds.) 2018. A Companion to Environmental Studies London: Routledge
- Richardson, D., Castree, N. et al. (eds.) 2017. International Encyclopedia of Geography (in 15 volumes) Malden: Wiley Blackwell.
- Castree N. and D. Gregory (eds.) 2011. Human Geography. Major Works in Social Science, the Humanities and the Physical Sciences. London, Thousand Oaks and New Delhi: Sage.
- Castree N., P. Chatterton, N. Heynen, W. Larner & M. Wright (eds.) 2010. The Point is to change it. Antipode Book Series. Oxford and Malden: Wiley-Blackwell.
- Castree N., D. Demeritt, D. Liverman & B. Rhoads (eds.) 2009. A Companion to Environmental Geography. Oxford and Malden: Wiley-Blackwell.
- R. Kitchin, N. Thrift, N. Castree, M. Crang and M. Domosh (eds.) 2009. International Encyclopedia of Human Geography. Amsterdam: Elsevier. 2nd edition published 2019.
- Castree, N., D. Gregory (eds.) 2006. David Harvey: a Critical Reader. London and New York: Blackwell.
- Castree, N., A. Rogers, D. Sherman (eds.) 2005. Questioning Geography: Essays on a Contested Discipline. Oxford and New York: Blackwell.
- Castree, N., B. Braun (eds.) 2001. Social Nature: Theory, Practice and Politics. Oxford and Malden: Blackwell.
- Braun, B. and Castree, N. (eds.) 1998. Remaking Reality: Nature at the Millennium. London & New York: Routledge.
