= Social nature =

Social Nature is the core concept of a geographical work on the social construction of nature, entitled Social nature: theory, practice and politics, which was published by Noel Castree and Bruce Braun in 2001.

The book states that the concept of Social Nature was created by critical geographers and embraces the idea of a socialized nature. Critical geographers such as David Harvey and Neil Smith "insisted that nature is social in three related ways":

- Knowledge "of nature is invariably inflected with the biases of the" knowers,
- "Though knowledges of nature are social through and through, the social dimensions of nature are not reducible to knowledge alone",
- Societies "physically reconstitute nature, both intentionally and unintentionally", to the point of internalizing nature into social processes (particularly in advanced Western societies).
