= Peter Fonagy =

British psychoanalyst (born 1952)

Peter Fonagy CBE FBA FAcSS FMedSci
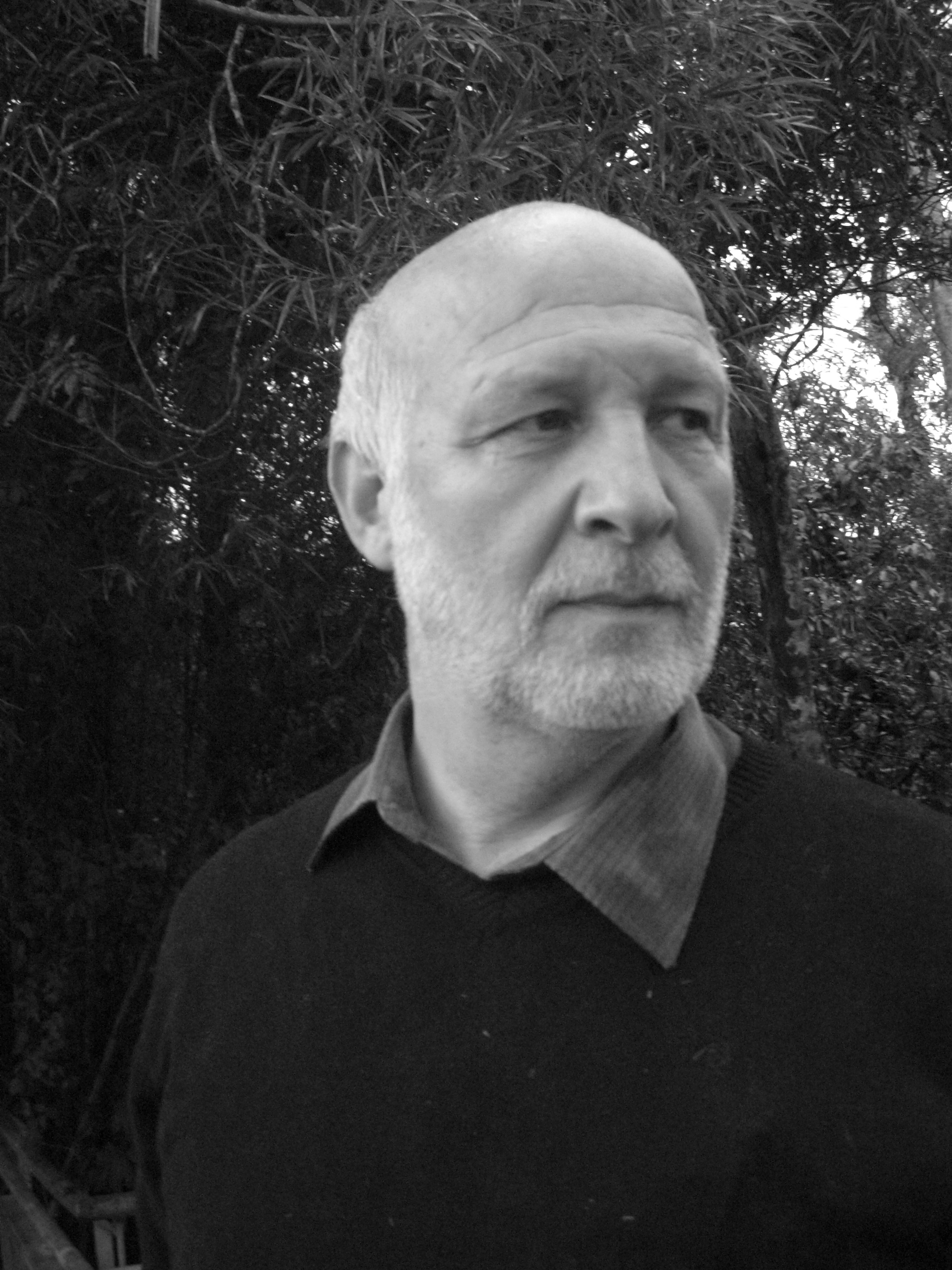
- Born: Peter Fonagy; 14 August 1952 (age 74); Budapest, Hungary
- Education: University College London
- Spouse: Dr Anna Higgitt (m. 1990)
- Children: 2
- Awards: Otto Weininger Memorial Award
- Scientific career
- Fields: Borderline personality disorder Psychotherapy outcomes Attachment theory Psychoanalysis
- Workplaces: University College London; Baylor College of Medicine
- Thesis: The use of low signal-to-noise ratio stimuli for highlighting functional differences between the two cerebral hemispheres (1982)
- Doctoral advisor: Norman F. Dixon
- Website: profiles.ucl.ac.uk/7792-peter-fonagy

Peter Fonagy (born 14 August 1952) is a British psychoanalyst and clinical psychologist and Professor of Contemporary Psychoanalysis and Developmental Science Head of the Division of Psychology and Language Sciences at University College London and a training and supervising analyst in the British Psychoanalytical Society in child and adult analysis. His clinical interests center on issues of borderline psychopathology, violence, and early attachment relationships. He served as chief executive of the Anna Freud Centre in London for 21 years until September 2024. His work integrates empirical research with psychoanalytic theory and he has published over 850 papers, and 300 chapters and has authored 25 and edited 20 books.

== Education ==
Fonagy moved to England in 1967, when he was fifteen, speaking almost no English and was educated at secondary modern school in London. He went on to study at University College London where he was awarded a Bachelor of Science degree in 1974, a Diploma in Clinical Psychology in 1980 and a PhD in 1982 for research supervised by Norman F. Dixon.

== Career and research ==
Fonagy was appointed twice as a Senior Investigator by the National Institute for Health and Care Research (NIHR).

=== Contemporary psychoanalysis ===
Fonagy has helped to improve the dialogue between analysts and cognitive therapists and plays a major role in the evaluation of psychotherapy research. The evaluation of his research is (mostly) based on the effectiveness of treatment. Evaluation of treatment has led to review, recommendations, and implications of psychotherapy. Fonagy has offered detailed evidence for the efficacy of psychological interventions for mental disorders and for special populations, including medical and psychosocial therapies for children and young people and psychological therapies for borderline personality disorder.

=== Mentalization ===
In their award-winning book Affect Regulation, Mentalization and the Development of the Self, Fonagy and his colleagues put forth a detailed theory for the way in which the abilities to mentalize and to regulate affect can determine an individual's successful development. They define mentalization as the ability to make and use mental representations of their own and other people's emotional states. The authors discuss the ways in which bad and insufficient parenting, leading to certain attachment styles, can leave children unable to modulate and interpret their own feelings, as well as the feelings of others. These inabilities to mentalize and regulate affect have implications for severe personality disorders, as well as general psychological problems of self-confidence, and sense of self.

=== Mentalization-based treatment ===
Fonagy is particularly interested in borderline personality disorder (BPD), which was for a long time assumed to be treatment-resistant. He and Anthony Bateman proposed a new way to treat BPD in their book Psychotherapy for borderline personality disorder: mentalization-based treatment. Mentalization-based treatment (MBT), rooted in attachment theory, is based on the idea that people with borderline personality disorder mainly lack a reliable capacity to mentalize, which is caused by an absence of contingent and marked mirroring during development. The primary goals of treatment are to improve mentalization skills, make connections between the inner experience of relationships and the actual representation, learn how to work with current emotions and how to establish real relationships. In this way, they could form a more coherent sense of self and develop new (secure) attachment styles.

=== Awards and honours ===
In the 2024 Birthday Honours, Peter Fonagy was appointed a Commander of the Order of the British Empire (CBE) for services to mental health care for children and young people.

Fonagy was appointed Officer of the Order of the British Empire (OBE) in the 2013 Birthday Honours for services to psychoanalysis and clinical psychology and received the Wiley Prize of the British Academy for Lifetime Achievements.

Fonagy is an elected Fellow of the British Academy (FBA), a Fellow of the Academy of Medical Sciences (FMedSci), a Fellow of the Academy of Social Sciences (FAcSS), and Honorary Fellow of the Royal College of Psychiatrists and American Academy of Psychiatry.

Fonagy received numerous awards for his contributions to contemporary psychoanalysis including the Otto Weininger Memorial Award (2005), the Sigmund Freud Prize of the City of Vienna (2007), the Sigourney Award (2011), the Haskell Norman Prize for Excellence in Psychoanalysis (2017) and contributions to developmental psychology including The Rene Spitz Award of the World Association for Infant Mental Health (2012), The British Academy's Wiley Prize (2015), as well as several lifetime achievement awards including The British Psychologcal Society (2013), The International Society for the Study of Personality Disorders (2015) The Bowlby-Ainsworth Award for Lifetime Contributions (2017), the Brazelton Award for Lifetime Achievement in Early Childhood Mental Health (2019).

=== Publications ===
- Fonagy, P. (1996). "Attachment, the development of the self, and its pathology in personality disorders". Psychomedia: 26–32.
- Fonagy, P. (2001). Attachment Theory and Psychoanalysis. Other Press.
- Fonagy, P.; Gergely, G.; Jurist, E.; Target, M. (2002). Affect Regulation, Mentalization, and the Development of the Self. Other Press.
- Fonagy, P.; Target, M. (2003a). Psychoanalytic Theories: Perspectives from Developmental Psychopathology. Whurr Publications.
- Bateman, A; Fonagy, P. (2003b). "The development of an attachment-based treatment program for borderline personality disorder". Bulletin of the Menninger Clinic. 67 (76): 187–211. doi:10.1521/bumc.67.3.187.23439. PMID 14621062.
- Bateman, A; Fonagy, P. (2004a). "Mentalization based treatment of borderline personality disorder". Journal of Personality Disorders. 18 (18): 36–51. doi:10.1521/pedi.18.1.36.32772. PMID 15061343.
- Fonagy, P.; Bateman, A. (2004b). Psychotherapy for Borderline Personality Disorder: Mentalization Based Treatment. Oxford University Press.
- Fonagy, P.; Roth, A. (2004c). What Works For Whom? A Critical Review of Psychotherapy Research (2nd ed.). Guilford.
- Fonagy, P.; Roth, A.; Higgitt, A. (2005). "Psychodynamic psychotherapies: Evidence-based practice and clinical wisdom". Bulletin of the Menninger Clinic. 69 (69, 1): 1–58. doi:10.1521/bumc.69.1.1.62267. PMID 15899755.
- Fonagy, P.; Target, M (2006a). "The mentalisation-based approach to self pathology". Journal of Personality Disorders. 20 (6): 544–576. doi:10.1521/pedi.2006.20.6.544. PMID 17192138.
- Fonagy, P.; Bateman, A (2006b). "Mechanism of change in mentalisation based treatment of borderline personality disorder" (PDF). Journal of Clinical Psychology. 62 (4): 411–430. doi:10.1002/jclp.20241. PMID 16470710.
- Randomized controlled trial of outpatient mentalization-based treatment versus structured clinical management for borderline personality disorder

== Personal life ==
Fonagy married Dr Anna Higgitt in 1990 and has two children.
