= Jessica Benjamin =

American psychoanalyst

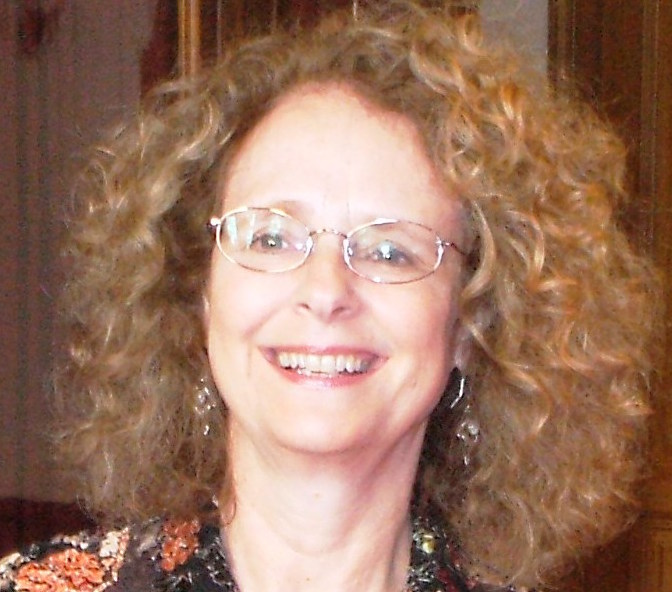
- Psychoanalyst Jessica Benjamin, at the Freud Memorial Lecture in Vienna, May 2008
- Born: 1946 (age 79–80)

Academic background
- Education: University of Wisconsin, Madison; University of Frankfurt; New York University (PhD)
- Thesis: Internalization and Instrumental Culture: A Reinterpretation of Psychoanalysis and Social Theory (1978)
- Doctoral advisor: Richard Sennett, Dennis Wrong, Bertell Ollman

Academic work
- Main interests: Psychoanalysis, feminism
- Notable works: The Bonds of Love: Psychoanalysis, Feminism and the Problem of Domination, Like Subjects, Love Objects: Essays on Recognition and Sexual Difference, Shadow of the Other: Intersubjectivity and Gender in Psychoanalysis
- Notable ideas: Intersubjectivity

Jessica Rachel Benjamin (born 1946) is a psychoanalyst known for her contributions to psychoanalysis and social thought. She is currently a practicing psychoanalyst in New York City where she is on the faculty of the New York University Postdoctoral Psychology Program in Psychoanalysis and Psychotherapy, and the Stephen Mitchell Center for Relational Studies. Jessica Benjamin is one of the original contributors to the fields of relational psychoanalysis, theories of intersubjectivity, and gender studies and feminism as it relates to psychoanalysis and society. She is known for her ideas about recognition in both human development and the sociopolitical arena.

== Biography ==
Jessica Benjamin was born to a Jewish family and earned her bachelor's degree from the University of Wisconsin, Madison in 1967, and her MA from the University of Frankfurt in West Germany, where she studied Psychology, Sociology and Philosophy. Jessica Benjamin earned her PhD in Sociology from NYU in 1978. She received her psychoanalytic training from New York University Postdoctoral Psychology Program in Psychoanalysis and Psychotherapy and engaged in post doc research on infancy with Dr. Beatrice Beebe at the Albert Einstein College of Medicine.

She is a Fellow of the New York Institute for the Humanities.

== Work ==
Her early studies included social structure and feminism, but more recently she is known for her effort to explain the classical aspects of psychoanalysis using object relations, relational psychoanalysis, and feminist thought. She has made significant contributions to the concept of intersubjectivity in psychoanalysis.

Benjamin has published four books.

In The Bonds of Love: Psychoanalysis, Feminism and the Problem of Domination (1988) Benjamin undertook a major revision of Freud's theories of both human development and sexuality. Using contemporary research on infancy and gender, she argued for the importance of recognition and the intersubjective relationship. Against this background, she showed how relationships of domination involve the alienation of recognition, and a form of gender splitting she called gender polarity. She argued that we accept and perpetuate relationships of domination not because of an inherent aggressive instinct, but the difficulty of recognizing the Other. She theorizes that domination is a complex psychological process which ensnares both parties in bonds of complicity, and supports this by showing how it affects our family life, our social institutions, and especially our sexual relations, in spite of our conscious commitment to equality and freedom.

The Bonds of Love, Revisited is an edition that celebrates the influence of Jessica Benjamin's work through fifteen essays that look back on the book's impact, offering theoretical deliberations and elaborations of the book's original themes and reflection on the book's impact personally and professionally, for clinicians and feminists around the world.

Benjamin's second book, Like Subjects, Love Objects: Essays on Recognition and Sexual Difference (1995) further developed the psychoanalytic theory of intersubjectivity, revising Freud's oedipal theory to include both genders' need to integrate independence and connection. She builds on the foundation of Freud's Oedipal theory, critically revising it to include the female's struggle for independence. She argues that traditional Freudian theories inevitably reproduce patriarchal gender relationships which are characterized by domination and submission, most notably reflected in the cultural polarity of male rationality and female vulnerability.

Shadow of the Other: Intersubjectivity and Gender in Psychoanalysis (1997), extends Benjamin's work on intersubjectivity, love and aggression.

In 2017, Benjamin published her fourth book, Beyond Doer and Done to: Recognition Theory, Intersubjectivity and the Third, an expansion of her theory of mutual recognition and its breakdown into the complementarity of "doer and done to."

== Reception ==
Benjamin is considered to be one of the most important and influential psychoanalysts of the last four decades. She is one of the founders of relational psychoanalysis, and is one of the first to introduce feminism and gender studies into psychoanalytic thought.

Benjamin's 2004 article Beyond doer and done to: An intersubjective view of thirdness is the 4th most cited journal article in the field of psychoanalysis.

In 2015, Benjamin received the Hans-Kilian-Award for her achievements in the fields of psychoanalysis, feminist psychology and the theory of intersubjective recognition.

== Bibliography ==
=== Books ===
- 1985: A desire of one's own : psychoanalytic feminism and intersubjective space
- 1988: The Bonds of Love: Psychoanalysis, Feminism and the Problem of Domination
- 1995: Like Subjects, Love Objects: Essays on Recognition and Sexual Difference
- 1997: Shadow of the Other: Intersubjectivity and Gender in Psychoanalysis
- 2017: Beyond Doer and Done to: Recognition Theory, Intersubjectivity and the Third

=== Selected Articles ===
- Benjamin, J. (2004). Beyond doer and done to: An intersubjective view of thirdness. Psychoanalytic Quarterly, LXXIII.
- Benjamin, J. (2005). From many into one: Attention, energy and the containing of multitudes. Psychoanalytic Dialogues, 15, 185–201.
- Benjamin, J. (2009). A relational psychoanalysis perspective on the necessity of acknowledging failure in order to restore the facilitating and containing features of the intersubjective relationship (The Shared Third). International Journal of PsychoAnalyisis, 90, 441–450.
- Benjamin, J. (2010). Can we recognize each other? Response to Donna Orange. The International Association for Psychoanalytic Self Psychology, 5, 244–256.
- Benjamin, J. (2010). Where's the gap and what's the difference?: The relational view of intersubjectivity, multiple selves, and enactments. Contemporary Psychoanalysis, 46, 112–119.
- Benjamin, J. (2011). Facing reality together discussion: With culture in mind: The social third. Studies in Gender and Sexuality, 12, 27–36.
