= Dances with Sheep =

2002 non-fiction book by Matthew Strecher

Dances with Sheep: The Quest for Identity in the Fiction of Murakami Haruki is a 2002 non-fiction book by Matthew Strecher, published by University of Michigan Press. It examines Japanese writer Haruki Murakami.

It was the first full length critical book about the author.

Ann Sherif of Oberlin College stated that the work examines the interaction among history and literature with "great seriousness". Sherif states that the work has "serious and sustained literary and cultural criticism."

== Contents ==
The book first situates Murakami’s fiction in its late‑20th‑century Japanese historical context, then frames recurring debates over ideology and identity that inform readings of his work. It outlines how questions of memory, violence, consumer modernity, and the self circulate through the novels and short fiction, setting up the theoretical lenses developed in later chapters.

The opening two chapters directly address reviewers who dismissed Murakami as “formulaic,” assembling counterarguments from close readings and narratological analysis to show variation in voice, structure, and motif across different creative periods. These chapters argue that surface similarities mask purposeful shifts in strategy tied to each work’s historical and thematic problem‑set.

Chapter three develops a Lacanian inquiry into desire, lack, and subject formation as a way to read Murakami’s recurring images and protagonists’ movement across symbolic boundaries. The analysis links these internal journeys to the encounter with the “Other” and to unstable negotiations between private fantasy and social normativity.

Chapter four turns to historiography, showing how Murakami’s narrative practice stages the friction between official histories and personal testimony, and how past violence persists in the present through embedded tales. While the discussion is anchored in academic frameworks, it also gestures to comparative cases—such as Norman Mailer—as examples of writers who grapple with contemporaneous events and their mediation.

Subsequent chapters bring the strands together by tracking how ideological critique and identity work converge in Murakami’s evolving poetics. The conclusion reiterates that the historical and the psychological are co‑constitutive in Murakami’s fiction.

== Reception ==
Ted Goosen of York University wrote that the book’s examination of Murakami in postmodernism “is especially convincing.” Citing Murakami’s responses to the Great Hanshin earthquake, the Japanese asset price bubble, and the Tokyo subway sarin attack, Goosen argued that the book’s assertion that Murakami’s historical viewpoints are the least postmodern aspect of his work “comes through most strongly in the final chapters.”

Erik R. Lofgren noted that the study’s emphasis on “intersubjectivity” over other classifications is “perhaps” where the book is “most successful,” highlighting how social and relational dynamics structure Murakami’s fictional worlds. Lofgren also wrote that the third chapter is “perhaps the most stimulating” compared to the others, for the way it develops its theoretical frame and close readings.

Ann Sherif stated that the work demonstrates “much critical acumen,” praising its command of historiographical and ideological debates. She also described the title as “playful,” aligning with the study’s strategy of reframing familiar critical labels.
