= Sidney Blatt =

American psychotherapist

Sidney J. Blatt
- Born: October 15, 1928; Philadelphia, Pennsylvania, U.S.
- Died: May 11, 2014 (aged 85); Hamden, Conn., U.S.
- Education: Pennsylvania State University; University of Chicago
- Known for: Two Configurations Approach to Depression, Representational Theory and Adaptive and Maladaptive Personality Development,
- Scientific career
- Fields: Psychology
- Workplaces: Yale University

Sidney J. Blatt (October 15, 1928 – May 11, 2014) was a professor emeritus of psychiatry and psychology at Yale University's Department of psychiatry. Blatt was a psychoanalyst and clinical psychologist, empirical researcher and personality theoretician, who made enormous contributions to the understanding of personality development and psychopathology. His wide-ranging areas of scholarship and expertise included clinical assessment, psychoanalysis, cognitive schemas, mental representation, psychopathology, depression, schizophrenia, and the therapeutic process, as well as the history of art. During a long and productive academic career, Blatt published 16 books and nearly 250 articles and developed several extensively used assessment procedures. Blatt died on May 11, 2014, in Hamden, Conn. He was 85.

== Biography ==
Sidney Blatt was the first of three children in a Jewish family in South Philadelphia. His parents, Harry and Fannie Blatt, owned a sweet shop and the family lived in the apartment upstairs. The family struggled financially, and this markedly shaped Blatt's life experience and ideological convictions. Blatt's first encountered psychoanalytic theory in high school through reading Freud's (1916-1917) Introductory Lectures on Psycho-Analysis. Fascinated with this book, he became determined to become a psychoanalyst.

== Career ==
After graduating South Philadelphia High School for Boys in 1946, Blatt began his university education at the Pennsylvania State University and, in 1952, completed his master's degree in clinical psychology, working under William Snyder. Blatt received honors for his thesis, Recall and recognition vocabulary: Implications for intellectual deterioration. In 1951, Blatt married his wife Ethel Shames, with whom he has three children (Susan, Judith and David). In 1954, Blatt entered the PhD program in Personality Development and Psychopathology in the Department of Psychology at the University of Chicago under the supervision of Morris I. Stein. He completed his dissertation in 1957, An Experimental Study of the Problem Solving Process. His predoctoral internship in clinical psychology was with Carl Rogers, who had a profound influence on Blatt's psychotherapeutic approach and his identity as a therapist. As a graduate student, Blatt was strongly influenced by the work of David Rapaport, especially his Organization and Pathology of Thought, a volume that Blatt says served as his “intellectual Talmud and Torah” during graduate school.

During his postdoctoral fellowship at the University of Illinois Medical School and at Michael Reese Hospital's Psychiatric and Psychosomatic Institute he was influenced by two psychologists, Mary Engel and Sarah Kennedy Polka, who had been trained at the Menninger Foundation in Topeka, Kansas, and introduced Blatt to Rapaport's approach to diagnostic psychological testing. Blatt joined the Department of Psychology at Yale University in 1960 as an assistant professor. Concurrently, he embarked on psychoanalytic training at the Western New England Institute for Psychoanalysis (WNEIP), supported by a grant from the Foundations Fund for Research in Psychiatry. During this training, Blatt worked with Roy Schafer, a psychoanalytic instructor and a Yale faculty colleague, who had worked extensively with Rapaport. This contact with Schafer enabled Blatt to consolidate his interest in Rapaport's work, especially the links between cognitive processes and personality organization and between representational development and psychopathology.

In July 1963, Blatt was appointed chief of the psychology section in the Department of Psychiatry at Yale, a position that he held till his retirement in 2011. During his 51 years at Yale, 48 years as chief psychologist, Blatt was the teacher and mentor of many students and colleagues who then went on to develop distinguished careers of their own (in alphabetical order): John Auerbach, Beatrice Beebe, Rachel Blass, Ted Brodkin, Diana Diamond, Kenneth Levy, Howard Lerner, Suniya Luthar, Patrick Luyten, Thomas Odgen, Donald Quinlan, Barry Ritzler, Golan Shahar, Paul Wachtel, Steven Wein, and many distinguished others. His collaboration initially with Donald Quinlan at Yale and later with David Zuroff, then at Quinnipiac College in Hamden, Connecticut, and now at McGill University in Montreal, Quebec, Canada, paved new grounds in the research and treatment of depression.

In addition to directing and participating in pre and post doctoral clinical training for psychologists in the department of psychiatry, Blatt, for many years, offered a core seminar on personality development and psychopathology in the graduate clinical psychology training program in the department of psychology and supervised research of graduate and undergraduates, most notably the senior essay of David C. Cohen, “Characteristics of complex problem solving following the induction of success or failure”, that won the Angell Award in 1964 as the outstanding senior essay and the 1996 doctoral dissertation by Carrie Schaffer, “The role of attachment in the experience and regulation of affect” that was accepted with distinction, a rare honor at Yale, especially for a dissertation in the clinical area.

Blatt was a visiting professor in many universities and clinical institutes through the world and received numerous professional honors. Among the institutions at which he has been a visiting scholar are the Hampstead Child Therapy and Tavistock Clinics, the Warburg Institute for Renaissance Studies, and University College London, all in London, England; the Austen Riggs Center, in Stockbridge, Massachusetts; the Menninger Foundation, which was then in Topeka, Kansas; Nova Southeastern University, in Fort Lauderdale, Florida; George Washington University, in Washington, District of Columbia; Catholic University of Leuven, in Leuven, Belgium; and several universities in Israel, including Ben Gurion University of the Negev, Bar Ilan University, and the Hebrew University of Jerusalem, where, in 1988-89, he was simultaneously the Sigmund Freud Professor of Psychoanalysis, the Ayala and Sam Zacks Professor of Art History, Director of the Freud Center for Psychoanalytic Study and Research, and a Fulbright Senior Research Fellow. Blatt made frequent visits to Israel to lecture and consult with colleagues.

Blatt received awards for Distinguished Contributions to Research from Division 12 (Clinical Psychology) and Division 39 (Psychoanalysis) of the American Psychological Association, the Bruno Klopfer and Marguerite Hertz Awards of the Society for Personality Assessment for Distinguished Contributions to Personality Assessment, the Hans H. Strupp and the Otto Weininger Awards for Distinguished Contributions to Psychoanalysis, the 1995 Outstanding Scientific Paper Award (with Golan Shahar) from the American Psychoanalytic Association, the Founder's Distinguished Teaching Prize from the Western New England Institute for Psychoanalysis, the Distinguished Contributions Award from the Committee on Research and Special Training (CORST) of the American Psychoanalytic Association, the Exceptional Research Award (with P. Luyten, N. Vielgen, and B. Van Houdenhave) from the International Psychoanalytic Association, and the Mary S, Sigourney Award for Distinguished Contributions to Psychoanalytic Theory and Research.

== Theory ==
=== Two Configurations Approach to Depression ===
Blatt began to develop his two configurations model of depression and, later, more broadly, of personality functioning, during his psychoanalytic training, when he noticed that two of his psychoanalytic control cases shared the same diagnosis, depression, but were very different with regard to their outward behavior and their predominant motivations or psychodynamics. The first patient was preoccupied with issues of interpersonal relatedness; she felt unloved and feared being abandoned. Her behavioral style could be characterized as dependent. The second patient had profound feelings of guilt and worthlessness despite a history of significant professional accomplishment. He was deeply self-critical. Blatt labeled these two types of depression anaclitic and introjective, respectively. The term anaclitic refers to the basic need to lean upon others and to form interpersonal bonds and relationships with them. The term introjective refers to the excessive harshness of superego introjects in individuals with self-critical depression. At about the same time, Blatt, with a graduate student Joseph D’Afflitti, developed the Depressive Experiences Questionnaire (DEQ), a self-report measure that assesses the daily life experiences, rather than the overt symptomatology, of depressed people. Analysis of the DEQ revealed three factors, the first two matching Blatt's theoretical understanding of anaclitic and introjective dimensions in depression. A third factor representing competency, strength, and belief in oneself, was termed efficacy. The DEQ has been used extensively not only to study aspects of clinical depression but also to explore nonclinical depressive experiences.

Blatt and colleagues subsequently realized that the two depressive experiences, anaclitic (or dependent) and introjective (or self-critical), could be linked to two fundamental developmental pathways, relatedness and self-definition, that occur in both normality and psychopathology and that mature or develop in complex interaction with each other. Blatt proposed that not just psychopathology but indeed normal psychological development and functioning could be understood as reflective of these fundamental developmental lines, relational and self-definitional. Thus, normal personality or character styles, clinical personality dysfunctions, and psychopathological symptoms and syndromes could all be classified with respect to their varying manifestations, whether adaptive or maladaptive, of relational and self-definitional needs. Blatt's recognition of the psychological centrality of these two fundamental personality dimensions structured his extensive examination, over the next 40 years, of the etiology, clinical characteristics, and treatment of depression, as well as of adaptive and maladaptive personality development more broadly in evolutionary, neurobiological, and sociocultural perspectives. Studies based on these two personality dimensions have called attention to the need to consider the effects of personality in multiple areas of research and intervention. For example, two aspects of self- definition, self-criticism and efficacy, were found to affect academic achievement among mid-school students, maternal self-criticism and dependency were found to affect mother-child communication and self-criticism was found to affect goal construction in young adulthood

=== Representational Theory and Adaptive and Maladaptive Personality Development ===
Integrating concepts from cognitive developmental psychology (i.e., ideas from Jean Piaget and Heinz Werner), psychoanalytic developmental theory (i.e., ideas from Beatrice Beebe, Anna Freud, Edith Jacobson, Margaret Mahler, and Daniel Stern) and attachment theory and research (i.e., ideas from Mary Ainsworth, John Bowlby, and Mary Main), Blatt proposed a model of personality development focusing on the development of cognitive-affective schemas of self and others, schemas that in the psychoanalytic literature are termed object relations, internalizations of relationships with emotionally significant others or objects. He posited that these schemas emerge from the interaction between basic biological or temperamental predispositions and the matrix of early caregiving relationships in which one is raised and, despite the centrality of early relational experiences in constituting them, continue to develop across the lifespan. By structuring the perception and experience of self and others, these cognitive-affective-experiential schemas guide an individual's eventual identity formation and intimate relationship choices. Disrupted caregiving and environmental demands that exceed the child's biological capacities can disrupt the development of these schemas and can result in psychopathology, usually in the form of either an exaggerated emphasis on relational needs at the expense of autonomy and individuation or an exaggerated emphasis on self-definition at the expense of relationship, attachment, and intimacy, although some persons have disruptions in both relational and self-definitional schemas and therefore manifest both relational and self-definitional disturbances in behavior. According to Blatt, the severity of psychopathology is associated with the developmental level or levels at which disruptions in the cognitive structural organization of these schemas of self and other occurred.

In early development, a sensorimotor-enactive stage, relationships are dominated by concerns with need gratification and frustration. This stage, assumed to take place in the early months of life, results in the formation of boundary constancy, the awareness of a distinction between self and other, between self and nonself. According to Blatt, disruption in the representational boundary between self and other is a predominant feature of schizophrenia and is expressed in cognitive, perceptual, and interpersonal disturbances including thought disorder, affective flattening, and interpersonal withdrawal. A second developmental achievement in this sensorimotor period occurs around 6 to 9 months of age, as the infant begins to establish recognition constancy by becoming emotionally attached to a particular person whom he or she recognizes as his or her most important emotional caregiver. Interpersonal schemas at this phase are based primarily on the predominant perceptual features of the person in question. The third achievement, evocative or object constancy, begins in the second year of life and is coincident with a concrete-perceptual stage, in which thinking is dominated by perceptual features and resemblances. Evocative or object constancy therefore involves the ability to maintain positive affective relationships with significant others during their absence (i.e., when they are not perceptually available) or during moments of negative affect. And as this capacity matures, it comes to involve the ability to maintain these same emotional ties in an environment involving significant emotional relationships with multiple figures. In the third year of life, as self-reflective capacity consolidates, as indexed by the capacity to recognize oneself in the mirror and therefore to regard oneself as an object who can be perceived by others, evocative constancy expands to include constancy of the self—that is, the maintenance of a consistent and coherent self-representation through time, space, and varying emotional states. Severe relational disturbances in evocative constancy, both of others and of self, are associated with borderline personality organization, with prominent dependence in anaclitically oriented individuals and with prominent paranoia and counterdependence in more introjective persons. Less severe disturbance during this concrete-perceptual developmental stage is often reflected in empty, rather than self-critical, depression or in a dependent personality style in anaclitic persons or in moderate to severe obsessive-compulsive disturbance, both symptom-focused and characterological, in more introjective individuals.

At approximately age five, around the same time that a child begins to develop a theory of mind, as indexed by such signs of early intersubjectivity as the ability to understand false beliefs and to appreciate the relativity of others’ physical perspectives, the external-iconic developmental stage begins, in which cognitive-affective schemas are based primarily on others’ actions, rather than on their perceptual appearance—on what they do, rather than on what they look like. This developmental stage is also approximately coincident with the concrete operational capacity to coordinate two physical dimensions (e.g., height and width) at once and, in the relational world, to coordinate relationships with two significant figures (e.g., mother and father, a parent and a sibling, two friends), rather than with only one at a time (e.g., with mother only or with father only), as is the case in the concrete-perceptual phase. Relationships at this point therefore become primarily triadic, rather than primarily dyadic, and issues of rivalry and competition, rather than just of loss, separation, or abandonment, become prominent, with well-functioning individuals beginning to form relationships that are mutual or cooperative, even when competition is also present. Higher-level neurotic organizations (e.g., histrionic personalities, higher-level obsessional and self-critical personalities) are often associated with disturbances at this phase. Toward late childhood or early adolescence, internal-iconic representation, in which relational schema are based primarily on characteristic ways that self or others think and feel, emerges, and with this achievement, coincident with the emergence of formal operation thought, comes the capacity to understand significant figures as unique individuals with complex, sometimes conflicting thoughts, emotions, and motives. The capacity for higher levels of intersubjectivity—that is, the ability to understand others’ psychological, rather than just physical, perspectives—also emerges here, in consequence, this stage is associated with identity formation and the beginnings of adult intimate relationships. At this stage, the ability to integrate complexities and conflicts is not yet fully consolidated, however, so the individual remains vulnerable, usually to excessive but more focused depressive states, in response to relational loss if anaclitic or to achievement failures or moral transgressions if introjective. And finally, in late adolescence and early adulthood, individuals begin to develop conceptual schemas, in which one integrates all previous representational levels into complex, coherent understandings of self and significant others that take into account conflicts and contradictions in a person's character. The fullest expressions of intersubjectivity, in which one recognizes that the psychological perspectives of both self and other are relationally constructed, require a conceptual level of representation. At this level of functioning, psychological disturbances are still possible in response to losses, failures, and moral transgressions but are likely, unless the psychological injuries in question are severe or traumatic, to be mild or transient.

=== Psychological assessment ===
Blatt and colleagues have developed various unstructured procedures and rating scales for the systematic assessment of the thematic content and cognitive structural organization of representation of self and significant others and have also developed a self-report instrument for the measurement of depressive experiences, anaclitic or dependent versus introjective or self-critical.

=== Representational Processes ===
The Concept of the Object on the Rorschach Scale (COR) is a coding system Blatt and colleagues developed to assess the quality of human responses on the Rorschach. On the basis of cognitive developmental and object relations theory, the scale assesses human responses across six categories: differentiation, articulation, degree of internal motivation attributed to the figure's action, degree of integration of the object and its action, content of the action, and nature of interactions between figures. A developmental index and developmental mean across the six categories are computed separately for accurately perceived human figures and for inaccurately perceived human figures. The developmental mean and index for accurately perceived human figures assess investment in appropriate relationships while these variables for inaccurately perceived figures represent investment in inappropriate relationships, as expressed, for example, in unrealistic or autistic fantasies that seemed to serve an adaptive function in psychosis.

The Object Relations Inventory (ORI) is an open-ended technique for the assessment of qualitative (thematic) features and the cognitive-structural organization of self and object representations. Spontaneously descriptions of self and significant others (i.e., parents, therapist or close friend) are scored for Conceptual Level (CL, with sensorimotor, concrete-perceptual, external and internal iconic, and conceptual levels, per the above developmental sequence), which is considered a structural variable reflecting degree of psychological organization of significant-figure descriptions, as well as for three content factors (Benevolent, Punitive and Striving). Blatt and colleagues later developed the Differentiation-Relatedness (D-R) Scale, another method for evaluating self and other descriptions that is more experiential and affective than the CL Scale and that takes into account more severe boundary disturbances at its lowest levels and more sophisticated aspects of intersubjectivity at its highest levels. The D-R Scale has been found to measure the therapeutic transition of borderline patients from descriptions of self and significant others that are polarized and exaggerated, with extreme, unmodulated characteristics, whether positive or negative, to descriptions that begin to integrate contradictory aspects of self or others and that therefore indicate the transition into evocative object constancy. In addition, Blatt, Bers, and Schaffer developed six scales for assessing aspects of descriptions of self, including mode of description, sense of relatedness, cognitive variables, view of the self, developmental variables, affective variables, and length. Each category (except length) consists of two to four scales, covering various aspects of the description. Participants are scored on every scale separately, and then a weighted assessment is computed. This measure has found that anorexic patients show many signs of introjective, self-critical organization that are not found in other psychiatric patients

Using qualitative aspects of self and significant-figure descriptions collected with the ORI, Auerbach and Blatt found that self descriptions of schizophrenic individuals are often interpersonally distanced and emotionally muted, with impairment in self-reflective capacity, whereas in borderline individuals, self descriptions retain a self-reflective capacity but are often disorganized by intense emotions and difficulties in maintaining a constant view of self. Blatt and colleagues also found evidence that the process of change in severely impaired patients often involves identifying their own positive qualities in their therapists and then learning to reappropriate these same positive qualities for themselves.

Spatio-temporal dimensions. David Roth and Blatt articulated a developmental progression in the representation of space and time—from an emphasis on two-dimensional vertical stratification to the representation of three-dimensional objects moving across three-dimensional space, and related aspects of this progression to types of psychopathology. As part of these formulations, Roth & Blatt noted an association between the representation of transparent and cross-sectional images and suicidality, an observation subsequently supported by empirical investigation

Cultural development of modes of representation. Blatt and his wife Ethel, applying developmental theory to an analysis of cultural development, examined the development of the capacity to represent a three-dimensional reality on a two dimensional surface in the development of painting in Western Civilization, from the Paleolithic cave paintings at Altamira in Spain and Lascaux in France, to the conceptual modern art of Pollock and Agam. They noted that Piaget's formulations of the child's development of the capacity to represent space and time provided a theoretical structure for understanding the development of the representation of space and time in art, as well as in science in the history of Western Civilization

=== Boundary Disturbances and Thought Disorder ===
Blatt and Ritzler established a continuum of thought disorder on the Rorschach based on the degree of boundary disturbance, with a collapse of self-other and self-nonself boundaries (contaminations) at the lowest level, intrusion of intense emotion into realistic perception (confabulations) at middle levels, and arbitrary unrealistic relationships based on spatiotemporal contiguity of independent objects (fabulized combinations) at the highest level of impaired boundary representation. They found that contaminations were associated with schizophrenia and that confabulations and fabulized combinations were associated with severe mood disturbances and with borderline states. Much later, Blatt, Besser, and Ford found that therapeutic gain in anaclitic and introjective inpatients was expressed in changes in different types of thought disorder. Therapeutic gain in anaclitic (relationally oriented) inpatients was expressed primarily in reductions in contaminations and confabulations (thought disorder with greater boundary disturbance) while therapeutic gain in introjective (self-oriented) inpatients was expressed primarily by reduction in the less seriously disturbed thought disorder responses, the fabulized combinations.

Depressive Experience Questionnaire (DEQ) is a 66-item scale containing statements about the everyday life experiences of the self and interpersonal relations reported by depressed patients. Participants are asked to agree or disagree on a 7-point scale. Three factors were identified by a Principal Components Analysis: Dependency (reflecting preoccupation with abandonment, loss, and separation). Self-criticism (reflecting intense concerns with failure and being unable to meet high self-standards), and Efficacy (representing believe in oneself and personal strength). The DEQ has been translated into more than 25 languages and its factor structure has been replicated in many different samples in a wide range of cultures. An adolescent version of the scale has also been constructed.

=== Psychotherapy research ===
In the last two decades of his 50 years of research, Blatt, and colleagues, have investigated aspects of the psychotherapeutic process and the effects of psychoanalysis as compared to supportive expressive psychotherapy, as well as the impact of patients' pretreatment personality organization on therapeutic process and outcome in brief treatments for depression. They found that patients in each of the two personality configurations (anaclitic and introjective) react differently to expressive-supportive therapy and to psychoanalysis. Patients with introjective personality organization are more responsive to psychoanalysis while anaclitic patients are more responsive to psychotherapy. Blatt and colleagues (e.g. ) also found that anaclitic and introjective patients express therapeutic change in different ways—in ways congruent with their basic personality organizations, such that anaclitic patients become more relationally stable and such that introjective patients display an increase in cognitive efficiency As noted earlier, Blatt, Besser and Ford found that therapeutic progress among seriously disturbed anaclitic patients is expressed in a decline in more serious forms of thought disorder — those indicating more serious forms of boundary disturbance, which introjective patients change primarily on less serious forms of thought disorder. Shahar, Blatt and Ford also found that "mixed-type" inpatients (anaclitic-introjective), compared to the "pure" type patients, though initially more symptomatic, were more likely to improve in long-term, psychodynamically oriented psychotherapy.

In research into the therapeutic process, Blatt and colleagues (e.g.,), using representational, cognitive-affective, schemas to assess therapeutic outcome in the inpatient treatment of serious disturbed young adults, found that therapeutic gain was correlated with this changes in both the content and cognitive organizational structure of representations of self and of significant others. Blatt and colleagues, examining how patients’ pretreatment personality organization influences the therapeutic processes, also found, for example, that pretreatment benevolent interpersonal schemas facilitated the capacity to engage in the therapeutic alliance and thus have sustained benefit from psychotherapy. Blatt et al. also found, on the basis of further analysis of data from the National Institute for Mental Health's Treatment of Depression Collaborative Research Project, that patients high in need for approval (anaclitic patients) tend to do well in short-term manualized depression treatment but that perfectionistic (introjective) patients have difficulty in engaging in brief treatment and often show little symptomatic improvement.

=== Summary ===
Sidney Blatt's extensive theoretical and research contributions have articulated continuities between variations in adaptive personality development with various forms of maladaptive personality development (psychopathology), thereby providing a theoretically coherent, empirically validated alternative to the dominant, but extensively criticized (e.g.,) Diagnostic Statistical Manual of Mental Disorders (the DSM) categorical, symptom-based, disease model of psychopathology (e.g.,). Blatt has also demonstrated the importance of looking beyond the symptomatic expression of various disorders to identify and understand the basic personality organization as it is expressed in the content and cognitive organizational structure of representations of self and of significant others. Blatt and colleagues have demonstrated that these representations or cognitive-affective interpersonal schemas are the basis foundations of various forms of adaptive and maladaptive personality organization and are also central in the treatment process and to sustained therapeutic change.
