= Silvia Montefoschi =

Italian psychoanalyst (1926–2011)

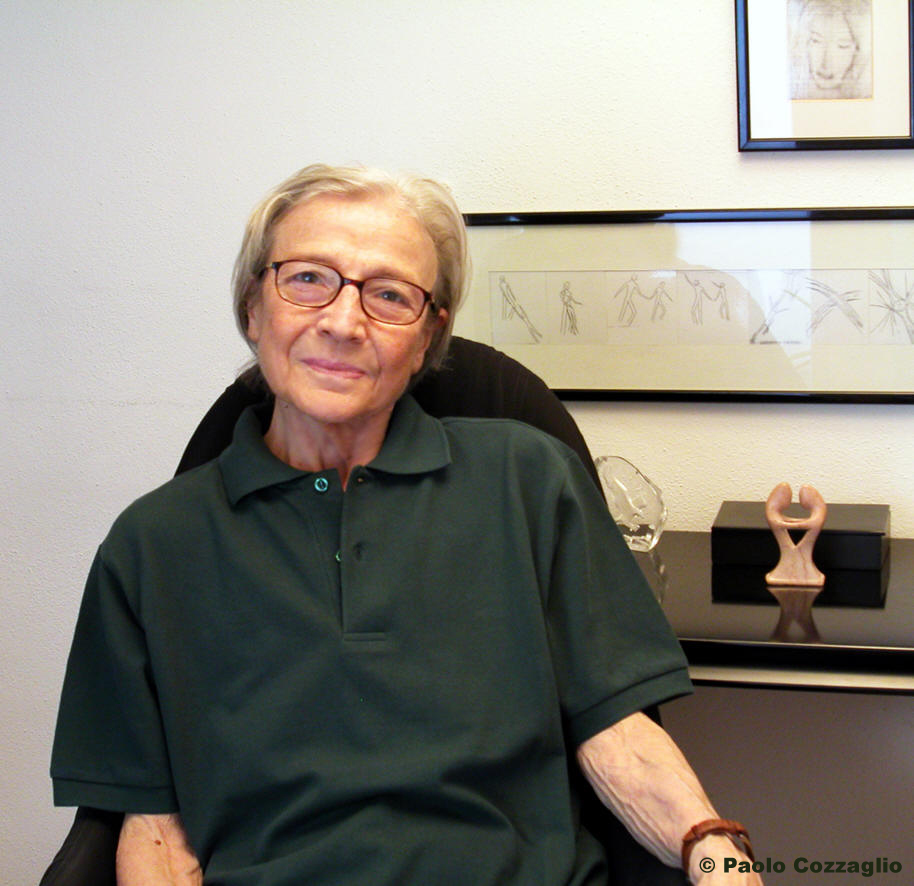

Silvia Montefoschi (1926 – 2011) was an Italian Jungian psychoanalyst.

== Early life and education ==
Montefoschi was born in Rome. She started studying psychoanalysis after the degree in medicine and in biology. She was a student of Ernst Bernhard, (in turn student of Jung). She was distinguished, since her first works, for an interpretation in dialectical key of the Jungian thought.

== Work ==
From the vision of the psychoanalytic relationship as an intersubjective evolutionary relationship, she theorized the universal meaning of the human cognitive experience as process of self-consciousness and evolution of the being.

After 1977, she began focusing on issues of intersubjectivity in a unified reading of the history of psychoanalysis from Sigmund Freud to Carl Jung and to this day, applying the "principle of individuation" to the same psychoanalysis and its history.

== Selected works ==
Her books constitute an organic work of knowledge of the reality, that goes over to know psychoanalytic:

- L'uno e l'altro. Interdipendenza e intersoggettività nel rapporto psicoanalitico, The one and the other (1977);
- Over the border of the person (1979);
- Dialectics of the unconscious (1980);
- Over the taboo of the incest (1982);
- The system man: catastrophe and renewal (1985);
- Carl Jung: un pensiero in divenire (1985)
- To Be the being (1986);
- The cosmic principle or of the taboo of the incest (1987);
- From the one to the one, over the universe (1998).
- Opere 1 - Il senso della psicoanalisi. Da Freud a Jung e oltre (2004)
- Il manifestarsi dell'essere in Silvia Montefoschi (2009) by Silvia Montefoschi, Bianca Pietrini and Fabrizio Raggi

Theater

- La storia vera dell'amore, The true story of love (1998), screenplay by Silvia Montefoschi, music by Giuseppe Lo Forte
- Lucifero dinamica divina, Lucifer dynamic divine (2000), screenplay by Silvia Montefoschi, music by Giuseppe Lo Forte

Poetry

- Fu una pioggia di stelle sul mio viso (1952)

Stories

- La rivoluzione radicale del reale (1996)
- Scherzo in attesa della fine del mondo (1996)

== See also ==
- Analytical psychology (or Jungian psychology) in Italy
- Intersubjectivity
- Intersubjective psychoanalysis
