= Self-criticism =

How an individual evaluates themselves

Self-criticism involves how an individual evaluates oneself. Self-criticism in psychology is typically studied and discussed as a negative personality trait in which a person has a disrupted self-identity. The opposite of self-criticism would be someone who has a coherent, comprehensive, and generally positive self-identity. Self-criticism is often associated with major depressive disorder and generalized anxiety disorder. Some theorists, such as Sidney Blatt, Samantha Reis and Brin Grenyer, define self-criticism as a mark of a certain type of depression (introjective depression), and in general people with depression tend to be more self-critical than those without depression. Even after depressive episodes, they will continue to display self-critical personalities. Much of the scientific focus on self-criticism is because of its association with depression.

== Personality theory ==
Sidney Blatt proposed a theory of personality that focuses on self-criticism and dependency. Blatt's theory is significant because he evaluates dimensions of personality as they relate to psychopathology and therapy. According to Blatt, personality characteristics affect our experience of depression and are rooted in the development of our interpersonal interactions and self-identity. He theorizes that personality can be understood in terms of two distinct dimensions - interpersonal relatedness and self-definition. These two dimensions not only represent personality characteristics but are products of a lifelong developmental process. Disruption in self-definition or identity leads to self-criticism, and disruption in relatedness leads to dependency. Zuroff (2016) found that self-criticism showed stability across time both as a personality trait and as an internal state. Such a finding is important as it supports the fact that self-criticism can be measured in the same manner as other personality traits.

Similar to Blatt's two personality dimensions, Aaron Beck (1983) defines social dependency and autonomy as dimensions of personality that are relevant for depression. Autonomy refers to how much the person relies on "preserving and increasing his independence, mobility, and personal rights". Furthermore, self-criticism involves holding oneself responsible for any past or present failures. Someone who is a self-critic will attribute negative events to deficiencies in their own character or performance. The personality characteristics that Beck describes as self-critical are usually negative for the person experiencing them. His description of their experience with self-criticism as a personality characteristic is therefore important because it will be similar to their experience of depression.

Self-criticism as a personality trait has been linked to several negative effects. In a study examining behavior differences between personality types, Mongrain (1998) found that self-critics experienced greater negative affect, perceived support worse than others, and made fewer requests for support. Those who were high in self-criticism did not differ in the amount of support they received, only in how they accepted or requested it. Participants categorized as being higher in self-criticism had fewer interpersonal goals as well as more self-presentation goals. Among romantic partners, self-criticism predicts a decrease in agreeable comments and an increase in blaming.

== Development ==
Given that self-criticism is typically seen as a negative personality characteristic, it is important how some people develop such a trait. As described by the personality theories above, self-criticism often represents a disruption in some characteristic. This disruption could be rooted back in the person's childhood experience. Children of parents who use restrictive and rejecting practices have been shown to have higher levels of self-criticism at age 12. In the same study, women displayed stable levels of self-criticism from age 12 into young adulthood, while men did not. These results show that parenting style can influence the development of a self-critical personality, and these effects may potentially last into young adulthood. Another study found that women who were higher in self-criticism reported that their father was more dominant and their parents maintained strict control and were inconsistent in their expressions of affection. Not surprisingly, these women also reported that their parents tended to seek out achievement and success from their children, as opposed to remaining passive. These studies show that certain experiences in childhood are associated with self-criticism, and the self-critical personality type then extends into later phases of development.

Child maltreatment, which is associated with the development of depression, may also be a risk factor for future self-criticism. Mothers who reported having experienced maltreatment as children also perceived themselves as less efficacious mothers. A factor analysis showed that the perception of being less efficacious was mediated by self-criticism, over and above the effects of depressive status. This research shows that self-criticism in particular plays an important role in the relationship between childhood maltreatment and maternal efficacy. In a study assessing child maltreatment and self-injury Glassman et al. (2007) found that self-criticism specifically was a mediator for the relationship between maltreatment and self-injury. This is particularly important because it shows that self-criticism may play a role in leading to self-injury. Understanding the origins of self-criticism in maltreatment could help prevent such behaviors. Given this research, it seems that self-criticism plays a role in the lasting effects of childhood maltreatment. Assessing self-criticism in preventing maltreatment as well as treating those who have been maltreated could therefore support further research in the area.

== Implications for psychopathology ==
Self-criticism is an important aspect of personality and development, but is also significant in terms of what this trait means for psychopathology. Most theorists described above account for self-criticism as a maladaptive characteristic, so unsurprisingly many researchers have found self-criticism to be connected to depression.

=== Risk factor for depression ===
Self-criticism is associated with several other negative variables. In one sample, differences in self-criticism as a personality trait were associated with differences in perceived support, negative affect, self-image goals, and overt self-criticism. These are all characteristics that pertain to the experience of depression, revealing that self-criticism affects depression. The persistence of self-criticism as a personality trait can leave some people vulnerable to developing depression. As stated above, Blatt theorized that people who were more self-critical and focused on achievement concerns were more likely to develop a specific type of depression, which he called introjective depression. Both Blatt and Beck have developed measures to assess self-criticism and the experience of depression. In addition to the fact that many personality theorists classified self-criticism as marking a certain "type" of depression, it has been shown to be a risk factor for the development of depression.

There has been a great deal of research assessing whether certain personality characteristics can lead to depression, among them self-criticism. In one study self-criticism was a significant predictor of depression in medical students, who go through extreme stress during and after medical school. Controlling for initial symptoms, self-criticism was a stronger predictor than even previous depression status both 2 years and 10 years after the initial assessment. In a sample with a history of depression, Mongrain and Leather (2006) found that measures of self-criticism were associated with the number of past episodes of depression. The personality was indicative of depression history, but self-criticism in an interaction with immature dependence was able to predict future episodes of depression as well. In a sample of people who either currently have depression or are in remission from a depressive episode, individuals reported both higher levels of self-criticism and lower levels of self-compassion. This same study found that self-critical individuals were also at an increased risk of experiencing depression chronically over the course of their lives. Self-criticism was also able to explain the variance in depression status for currently depressed, remitted depressed, and never depressed patients, over and above other variables. Carver and Ganellen (1983) assessed self-criticism by breaking it down into three distinct categories: Overgeneralization of negative events, high standards, and self-criticism. These three categories all deal with self-critical cognitions, and are measured by the Attitude Toward Self Scale, which Carver and Ganellen created.

=== Treatment outcome ===
In addition to acting as a risk factor for depression, self-criticism also affects the efficacy of depression treatment. Self-criticism as a trait characteristic therefore persists throughout a person's entire life. This means a person can display persistent, long-term levels of self-criticism as a personality trait, but levels of self-criticism can vary from moment to moment depending on the person's current mental state. Therefore, in terms of treatment for depression, it could be difficult for clinicians to accurately assess decreases in self-criticism. In a particular session, state levels of self-criticism may increase or decrease, but in the long term it is not as easy to see if trait levels of self-criticism have been reduced, and a reduction in trait self-criticism is more important in terms of effectively treating depression. In other words, it is likely easier to reduce state levels of self-criticism, so researchers who develop treatments for depression should have the goal of treating long-term, trait self-criticism.

It is possible that a change in depression symptoms may not necessarily co-occur with a change in personality factors, and given that self-criticism as a personality factor has been shown to lead to depression, this could be problematic. One study found that a positive change in depression occurred before any change in self-critical perfectionism. The authors of this study suggested that this has implications for deciding how long to provide treatment. If treatment ends as depression fades away, the underlying personality characteristics that affect depression may not have changed. In such a case extending treatment beyond the point when positive change is seen in depression symptoms may give the best results. This same study also found that levels of perfectionism (which are related to a self-critical personality) predicted the rate of change in depression status.

Self-criticism is known as autonomy in Beck's personality model, and there has been research looking at his conception of sociotropy and autonomy. Sociotropy characterizes socially dependent people, and their main source of distress is interpersonal relationships. Autonomy, however refers to self-critical individuals who are more concerned with independence and achievement. In a study examining treatment differences between these groups, Zettle, Haflich & Reynolds (1992) found that autonomous, self-critical individuals had better results in individual therapy than in group therapy. This research shows that personality characteristics can influence what kind of treatment is best for an individual, and that clinicians should be aware of these differences. Therefore, self-criticism is both a warning sign for the development of depression and affects how it is treated. It is an important facet of depression research, as it is important for how we might prevent and treat this debilitating disorder.

== Neuroscience ==
Research using fMRI has found that engaging in self-criticism activates areas in the lateral prefrontal cortex and dorsal anterior cingulate cortex which are brain areas responsible for processing error detection and correction. In contrast, engaging in self-reassurance activates the left temporal pole and insula areas previously found to be activated in compassion and empathy. Those that as a psychological trait engage in self-criticism tend to show an activated dorsolateral prefrontal activity, while ventrolateral prefrontal cortex activity was found in those with the trait of self-reassurance.

== See also ==
- Criticism
- Hamartia
- Mea culpa
- Political rehabilitation
- Self-criticism (Marxism–Leninism), a philosophical and political concept
- Self-deprecation
- Self-esteem
