= Robert Stolorow =

American psychoanalyst (born 1942)

Robert D. Stolorow (born 1942) is an American psychoanalyst and philosopher, known for his works on intersubjectivity theory with collaborator George E. Atwood, intersubjective psychoanalysis, and emotional trauma. Important books include: Faces in a Cloud (1979, 1993), Structures of Subjectivity (1984, 2014), Psychoanalytic Treatment: An Intersubjective Approach (1987), Contexts of Being (1992), Working Intersubjectively (1997), Worlds of Experience (2002), Trauma and Human Existence (2007), and World, Affectivity, Trauma: Heidegger and Post-Cartesian Psychoanalysis (2011).

He earned his PhD in clinical psychology from Harvard University and his PhD in philosophy from the University of California at Riverside.

== Awards ==
- 2012: Hans W. Loewald Memorial Award from the International Forum for Psychoanalytic Education

== Publications ==
- Stolorow, R. D. & Atwood, G. E. (1979, 1993). Faces in a Cloud: Subjectivity in Personality Theory. Northvale, NJ: Jason Aronson.
- Atwood, G. E. & Stolorow, R. D. (1984, 2014). Structures of Subjectivity: Explorations in Psychoanalytic Phenomenology and Contextualism. London & New York: Routledge.
- Stolorow, R. D., Brandchaft, B., & Atwood, G. E. (1987). Psychoanalytic Treatment: An Intersubjective Approach. Hillsdale, NJ: Analytic Press.
- Stolorow, R. D. & Atwood, G. E. (1992). Contexts of Being: The Intersubjective Foundations of Psychological Life. Hillsdale, NJ:

Analytic Press.

- Orange, D. M., Atwood, G. E., & Stolorow, R. D. (1997). Working Intersubjectively: Contextualism in Psychoanalytic Practice. Hillsdale, NJ: Analytic Press.
- Stolorow, R. D., Atwood, G. E., & Orange, D. M. (2002). Worlds of Experience: Interweaving Philosophical and Clinical Dimensions in Psychoanalysis. New York: Basic Books.
- Stolorow, R. D. (2007). Trauma and Human Existence: Autobiographical, Psychoanalytic, and Philosophical Reflections. New York: Routledge.
- Stolorow, R. D. (2011). World, Affectivity, Trauma: Heidegger and Post-Cartesian Psychoanalysis. New York: Routledge.
- Stolorow, R. D. & Atwood, G. E. (2018) The Power of Phenomenology: Psychoanalytic and Philosophical Perspectives. New York: Routledge.
