= Golan Shahar =

Israeli psychologist

- גולן שחר
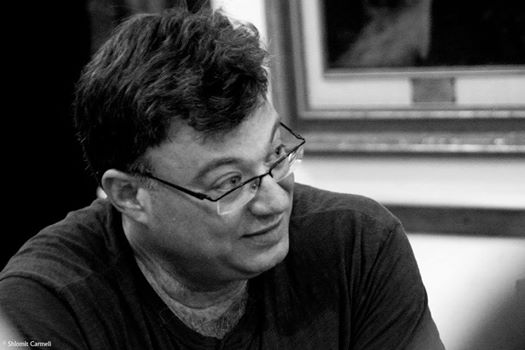
- Born: 1968 (age 57–58); Rishon Lezion
- Scientific career
- Fields: Psychology
- Workplaces: Ben-Gurion University of the Negev, Yale University School of Medicine
- Website: http://people.yale.edu/labs/GS239.profile

Golan Shahar (Hebrew: גולן שחר) is an Israeli clinical health psychologist and an interdisciplinary stress/psychopathology researcher.

== Biography and career ==
Shahar was born (1968) and raised in Rishon Le-Zion, Israel. He received all his academic degrees at Ben-Gurion University (BGU): a B.A. (1993) in behavioral sciences, an M.A. (1997) in clinical psychology, and a Ph.D. (1999) in psychological research. He has received advanced statistical training at the University of Essex, UK, and at the Universities of Michigan in Ann Arbor and Yale, US. He was clinically trained at the Shalvata Mental Health Center in Hod-Hasharon, Israel (1997–1999) and the Yale Child Study Center (2002–2004).

From 1999 to 2000, Shahar served on the faculty of Bar-Ilan University in Israel and received postdoctoral research training in the Departments of Psychology and Psychiatry at Yale University, under the tutelage of Sidney J. Blatt, a world-leading personality and clinical psychologist (2000–2002). Shahar than joined the faculty of the Department of Psychiatry as assistant professor (2002), with a subsequent affiliation with the Department of Psychology at Yale University (2003). In the fall of 2004, he returned to his alma mater, BGU. There, he first served as associate professor of psychology (2007) with a brief affiliation at the Department of Philosophy (2008), and was than promoted to tenured full professor in 2008. In 2016, he was named Zlotowsky Chair in Neuropsychology. Throughout his service at BGU, Shahar maintained his affiliation with the Department of Psychiatry at the Yale University School of Medicine.

== Academic and clinical work ==
Shahar's research, scholarship, and clinical practice targets three domains: The role of personality in depressive psychopathology, resilience and stress-resistance, and psychotherapy integration.

=== Criticism in the self, brain, and relationships ===
Shahar builds on – but also departs from – Sidney Blatt's theory of personality development and psychopathology. Blatt's double helix theory posits that personality and psychopathology develop along two related pathways, one focusing on interpersonal relatedness (the anaclitic-dependent dimension) and the other on identity and achievement (the introjective-self-critical dimension). While this theory has formidably influenced research and practice, Shahar and others have observed that, empirically, the self-critical dimension confers much more vulnerability than the dependent dimension. Consequently, Shahar decided to decipher the nature of criticism in the self, relationships, and – more recently – in brain structure and function. His empirical work, spanning two decades, has illuminated the central role of self-criticism in diverse psychopathologies. He has identified interpersonal pathways through which self-criticism confers its vulnerability. Specifically, research suggests that self-critical individuals actively create a social environment marred with stress and replete with positive events and social support, which, in turn, brings about these individuals' distress. In adolescence, this distress feeds back to individuals' self-criticism, creating "a self-critical cascade". This cascade is played out both within and outside psychotherapy, and even in the lives of chronic pain patients. In his recent book titled Erosion: The Psychopathology of Self-Criticism (published by Oxford University Press), Shahar offers a novel theory that illuminates the development of self-criticism throughout the life span. The theory depicts criticism in general and self-criticism in particular, as a distorted and addictive form of self-knowledge, which is amalgamated by societal norms and rules as well as by brain structures and functions.

=== Resilience and stress-resistance ===
Complementing his interest in psychological vulnerability is Shahar's fascination with the notion of resilience, i.e., individuals' ability to develop and thrive in the face of stressful conditions. However, Shahar is critical towards the notion that resilience is distinct from risk. Instead, he posits that any factor may confer both risk and resilience. Underlying this dialectic position on risk and resilience is Shahar's argument, whereby psychosocial factors are inherently multifaceted and multilayered, with some “variance facets” positively associated with health and illness, and others negatively associated with these outcomes. His work on adolescent perceived social support, carried out primarily with his chief collaborator, Prof. Christopher Henrich from Georgia State University, demonstrates this theoretical position. Shahar and Henrich, and their respective colleagues and students, have been examining the effects of social support from friends, parents, and school personnel on adolescents’ psychopathology and risk behaviors. They studied both community-dwelling American adolescents and Israeli adolescents who are routinely exposed to political and terror violence. Their research shows that, in most instances, perceived social support is a double-edged sword, conferring both risk and resilience. An exception to this pattern appears to be perceived social support from family members, which – according to Shahar and Henrich – should be the principal target of preventive interventions.

=== Psychotherapy integration ===
Shahar is a leading figure in the psychotherapy integration movement, which emphasizes the importance of transcending the traditional schools of thought in psychotherapy (e.g., the psychodynamic, cognitive-behavioral, humanistic –existential, and family-systems). He integrates psychodynamic, existential, and cognitive therapeutic techniques into a coherent theoretical gestalt, and applies this gestalt to the treatment of adolescents and young adults who present chronic, comorbid, complex, and treatment-resistant psychopathology.

== Academic and clinical leadership ==
From 2012 to 2016, Shahar served as chief editor of the Journal of Psychotherapy Integration (JPI). He is one of the co-founders of OFAKIM, an Israeli movement advocating the bridging of science and practice in Israeli professional psychology, and has also founded an online group listserv discussing the links between psychoanalysis and empirical research. He has served twice as director of Clinical Psychology Track at BGU, and has founded and directed the Center for the Advancement of Research on Stress and related disorders (BGU-CARES). He currently heads the Behavioral Science undergraduate program at BGU.
