= Intersubjective psychoanalysis =

The term "intersubjectivity" was introduced to psychoanalysis by George E. Atwood and Robert Stolorow (1984), who consider it a "meta-theory" of psychoanalysis. Intersubjective psychoanalysis suggests that all interactions must be considered contextually; interactions between the patient/analyst or child/parent cannot be seen as separate from each other, but rather must be considered always as mutually influencing each other. This philosophical concept dates back to German Idealism and Phenomenology.

== The myth of isolated mind ==
Trends in intersubjective psychoanalysis have accused traditional or classical psychoanalysis of having described psychic phenomena as "the myth of isolated mind" (i.e. coming from within the patient). Psychoanalyst and philosopher Jon Mills, has criticized this accusation as a misinterpretation of Freudian theory. However, the intersubjective approach emphasizes that psychic phenomena are contextual and an interplay between the analyst and analysand.

== Key figures ==
Heinz Kohut is commonly considered the pioneer of the relational and intersubjective approaches. Following him, significant contributors include Robert Stolorow, Stephen A. Mitchell, Jessica Benjamin, Bernard Brandchaft, James Fosshage, Donna M.Orange, Arnold Modell, Thomas Ogden, Owen Renik, Harold Searles, Colwyn Trevarthen, Edgar A. Levenson, J. R. Greenberg, Edward R. Ritvo, Beatrice Beebe, Frank M. Lachmann, Herbert Rosenfeld and Daniel Stern.

== Bibliography ==
- Atwood G. E., Stolorow R. D. (1984), Structures of Subjectivity: Explorations in Psychoanalytic Phenomenology
- Jessica Benjamin (1988), The Bonds of Love: Psychoanalysis, Feminism and the Problem of Domination
- Brandchaft, Doctors & Sorter (2010). Toward an Emancipatory Psychoanalysis. Routledge: New York.
- Buirski, P., Haglund, P. (2001). "Making Sense Together: the intersubjective approach to psychotherapy"
- Buirski, P. (2005). "Practicing Intersubjectively"
- Mills, J. (2012). Conundrums: A Critique of Contemporary Psychoanalysis. New York: Routledge.
- Orange, Atwood & Stolorow (1997). Working Intersubjectively. The Analytic Press: Hillsdale, NJ.
- Stolorow, Brandchaft & Atwood (1987). Psychoanalytic Treatment: An Intersubjective Approach. The Analytic Press:
- Storolow R. D., Atwood G. E. (1992), Context of Being: The Intersubjective Foundations of Psychological Life
- Storolow R. D., Atwood G. E., Brandchaft, B. (1994), The Intersubjective Perspective Hillsdale, NJ.
- Stolorow R. D., Atwood G. E. Orange D. M. (2002), "Worlds of Experience: Interweaving Philosophical and Clinical Dimensions in Psychoanalysis"
- Stolorow R. D., (2011), "World, Affectivity, Trauma: Heidegger and Post-Cartesian Psychoanalysis (Psychoanalytic Inquiry, Vol. 35)"
- Silvia Montefoschi (1977), "Interdipendenza e Intersoggettività in Psicoanalisi" ("Interdipendence and Intersubjectivity in Psychoanalysis")
