= Edward McCrorie =

American poet

- Born: November 19, 1936; Central Falls, Rhode Island
- Died: December 31, 2025 (aged 89)
- Occupations: professor, poet, translator

Edward McCrorie was a Professor Emeritus of English at Providence College in Providence, RI. He was the author of six collections of poetry and three verse translations of epics by Virgil and Homer.

== Biography ==
He was educated in local schools in Rhode Island and spent two and one half years at Our Lady of Providence Seminary in Warwick Neck, Rhode Island. From 1955 to 1959 he served with the U.S. Navy as an aircraft electrician, visiting ports in England and Greece.

He then resumed his education at Assumption College in Worcester, Massachusetts, graduating in 1962, and a masters of arts in English from Villanova University in 1964.

He began his career as an English Professor at Providence College in September 1964, and continued graduate work at Brown University, earning the Ph.D. in the spring of 1970.

He had married his first wife, Therese McNeil of Central Falls, Rhode Island in the summer of 1959. The two had four daughters over the years, Jeanne, Julia, Joyce and Cynthia.

He began publishing short poems in many literary journals in 1969 and saw his first book into print, After a Cremation, in 1974.

Brief translations of Virgil's Aeneid in that first book led to further experiments. Encouraged by Robert Bly and William Arrowsmith, among others, he published a verse translation of Virgil's epic in its entirety in 1991. This Collector's Edition from Donald Grant Press having won wide acclaim, the University of Michigan Press followed with a trade and a paperback edition.

He traveled widely and wrote more in Costa Rica, Europe and China, leading to the publication of his second book of poems, Needle Man, in 1999, with BrickHouse Books Press. Acupuncture was a principal focus in this work.

He was soon promoted through the ranks at Providence College as a result primarily of his poetry and translations. In fact an esteemed colleague, Rodney Delasanta, by this time a nationally reputed Chaucerian, convinced his colleagues on the Rank and Tenure Committee that the publication of a single exceptional poem was worth ten good scholarly articles.

Until this time his poetry had focused on family and social issues, its style lyrical and occasionally narrative. The election of George W. Bush to the U.S. Presidency in the fall of 2000, however, followed by the attacks on the World Trade Center and the Pentagon on September 11, 2001, drastically changed McCrorie's outlook, his whole political and literary orientation. Concerned with dramatizing essential American values, he began a story in verse called Washington's Night, depicting the psychological, political and military pressures on George Washington in December 1776, and culminating in his victory at the Battle of Trenton on December 26. America, the poem makes clear, stresses not only military power, but the longing for political freedom and especially a fundamental fairness, the justice for which the nation has become famous.

He was greatly helped in all this by his second marriage. Beatrice Beebe, whose work in New York City had explored mother-infant communication, and whose psychoanalytic practice had established her firmly in that field, was galvanized, like her husband, by the events of September 11. Her struggle to help the mothers and children who had lost their men that day would prove invaluable to her patients and, in time, to McCrorie.

But first, after a ten-year effort assisted by many Greek scholars, notably the late William Wyatt of Brown University, he published a verse translation of Homer's Odyssey with The Johns Hopkins University Press in 2004. In all his translations he persisted with the idea of close approximation: not only the sense but the sound of Homer's Greek he attempted to capture in English verse. Responses to this work were highly favorable; he would soon go on to Homer's Iliad.

Before then, the death of his mother prompted a number of poems in McCrorie's next book, published in 2010 by BrickHouse Books and called Gone Games. Childhood play also connects to this title, as do romances that come and go in one's adult life.

In the same year McCrorie published his first chapbook, Gretchen, with BrickHouse Books, and his first e-book with Amazon by the same title. For some time he had been working on a story in verse focusing on the life and political vision of Woodrow Wilson. Gretchen Schreiber, a German-American character in this story, suffers exceedingly when the U. S., following Wilson, goes to war with Germany in 1917. Generally Wilson will try to treat Germany fairly at the end of the war, however; indeed, McCrorie's principal aim in the story is to explore the question, How shall America send her best abroad? No President before Wilson had worked so hard trying to embody an answer to this question. His League of Nations was a crowning achievement in Paris, 1919.

On September 11, 2011, Beebe and other psychotherapists celebrated the tenth anniversary of their work with mothers and children who had lost their men in the World Trade Center attacks: they published, in the Journal of Infant, Child and Adolescent Psychotherapy, their 'Primary Prevention Project.' Profoundly moved by some of these chapters, McCrorie began a series of 'Pretend Ballads.' That book was published, in three separate editions, by the International Psychoanalytic Press in September, 2014.

In the fall of 2012, McCrorie had published his translation of Homer's Iliad with The Johns Hopkins University Press. Again the translator's aim was to approximate closely the meaning and music of the original, especially since the very word for poet in Homer's Greek is aeidos, singer. He has often presented the work to appreciative audiences, especially at Brown University, and the translation has been highly recommended in reviews.

The crisis of 2008, during which American and world economies floundered, had also turned McCrorie's attention to the Hebrew Bible. After reading Harold Bloom's essay, in which the author concluded that an English translation of the Psalms probably could not be faithful to the Hebrew and graceful as English both, McCrorie found himself powerfully drawn to the Prophecy of Jeremiah. Here was a work which warned of disaster for the Jews in the sixth century BCE and, in McCrorie's mind, portended extreme danger for his own people.

Translating Jeremiah then became a work-in-progress. He finished a first draft after four years and, with help from Jewish friends like Catherine Hiller and retired Rabbi David Kline, himself a translator of Genesis, McCrorie anticipated completion of the final draft in 2017.

By 1916, scientists and ordinary families worldwide had become disturbed, some even despairing, about the Earth's climate change. Among the many persons and sources McCrorie consulted, three women writers stood out: Gabrielle Walker, Elizabeth Kolbert and Adrian Klein explained past evidence and exposed present dangers in air and sea temperature, levels of carbon dioxide and the likely causes, including degradation by humans. Now with a fairly good picture of Homo sapiens' evolution over the past 200,000 years, often at the cost of many species' extinction, McCrorie began a series of poems about that evolution, hoping they would lead eventually to a book.

Then important changes in his family and professional life led to new experiments. Advised by his grandson, Shayne Collins, now a graduate of University of California, Los Angeles, residing in North Hollywood and pursuing a film career, McCrorie tried adapting some narrative poetry for the screen. Then other friends and family suggested he try creating a novel first. Called Africa Dust, that work should be finished and looking for a publisher in 2017; if successful in that form, it should stand a better chance of pleasing a film producer in Los Angeles.

Another friend, Al Alvarez, had meanwhile published Pondlife in 2013. Moved by its stories of healthy swimming in ponds north of London, McCrorie wrote Soundness: Stories of Good and Better Health from Childhood to Eighty. A memoir at times, a medical resource book often, the book now makes the rounds of literary agents.

== Works ==
- After a Cremation (poems), Thorp Springs Press, 1974
- The Aeneid of Virgil (translation), Donald M. Grant, Publisher, Inc., 1991
- Needle Man (poems), Chestnut Hills Press, 1999
- The Odyssey of Homer (translation), The Johns Hopkins University Press, 2004
