= George E. Atwood =

American psychologist

- Born: October , 1944; Carlsbad, New Mexico, U.S.
- Education: University of Arizona; University of Oregon
- Known for: Intersubjective psychoanalysis
- Scientific career
- Fields: Clinical psychology
- Workplaces: Rutgers University

George E. Atwood (born October 1944) is an American clinical psychologist. Atwood and his collaborator Robert Stolorow introduced the concept of intersubjectivity to the field of psychoanalysis. Their book Faces in a Cloud (1979) established the theory of intersubjective psychoanalysis which influenced analytic thinking across many schools of psychoanalysis. Atwood is professor emeritus of Clinical Psychology at Rutgers University where he received the Lindback Award. He is an honorary member of the American Psychoanalytic Association and Founding Faculty Member at the Institute for the Psychoanalytic Study of Subjectivity in New York City.

== Biography ==
George E. Atwood was born in Carlsbad, New Mexico, in 1944. He earned a B.A. in Psychology from the University of Arizona in 1965, an M.A. in Psychology from the University of Oregon in 1967, and a Ph.D. from the University of Oregon in 1969. His mentors included Austin DesLauriers and Silvan Solomon Tomkins. In the 1980s, Atwood and collaborator Robert Stolorow brought the concept of intersubjectivity into prominence in the field of psychoanalysis. Their book Faces in a Cloud (1979) was the seminal work from which emerged the influential psychological theory of intersubjectivity. This meta-theory reveals the ways in which the central constructs of personality theories universalize their creators' personal solutions to the crises and dilemmas of their own life histories. In this framework, personality theories are not objective representations of objective truth, but subjective representations of the personalities, experiences and issues of the theorists. Likewise, all interactions must be considered contextually; interactions between patient/analyst or child/parent are not separate from each other, and must be considered as mutually influencing each other. The intersubjective perspective has contributed to a philosophy of psychoanalytic practice known as contextualism.

Atwood is professor emeritus of Clinical Psychology at Rutgers University where he taught for 41 years and received the Lindback Distinguished Teaching Award. His major interests have included personality theory, psychotherapy, psychology of knowledge, psychosis, philosophical systems, and complex relationships between madness and creative genius. He is an honorary member of the American Psychoanalytic Association and Founding Faculty Member at the Institute for the Psychoanalytic Study of Subjectivity in New York City.

== Awards ==
- Lindback Award for Distinguished Teaching
- 2015, American Psychoanalytic Association Honorary Membership
- 2024, Lifetime Achievement Award for Extraordinary Accomplishments in Psychohistory from the Psychohistory Forum

== Selected works ==
- 1976, with S.S. Tomkins, On the subjectivity of personality theory. Journal of the History of the Behavioral Sciences, 12(2), 166-177.
- 1979, with R.D. Stolorow, Faces in a cloud: Subjectivity in personality theory. New York: Aronson. ISBN 978-0765702005
- 1984, with R.D. Stolorow, Structures of subjectivity: Explorations in psychoanalytic phenomenology. Hillsdale, N.J.: Analytic Press. ISBN 978-0415713887
- 1987, with R.D. Stolorow and B. Brandchaft, Psychoanalytic treatment: An intersubjective approach. Hillsdale, NJ: Analytic Press. ISBN 978-0881633306
- 1992, with R.D. Stolorow, Contexts of being: The intersubjective foundations of psychological life. Hillsdale, NJ: Analytic Press. ISBN 978-0881631524
- 1994, with R.D. Stolorow and B. Brandchaft, The intersubjective perspective. New York: J. Aronson. ISBN 978-1568210537
- 1997, with D.M. Orange and R.D. Stolorow, Working intersubjectively: Contextualism in psychoanalytic practice (Ser. Psychoanalytic inquiry book series, vol. 17). Analytic Press. ISBN 978-0881633603
- 2002, with R.D. Stolorow and D.M. Orange, Worlds of experience: Interweaving philosophical and clinical dimensions in psychoanalysis. New York, NY: Basic Books. ISBN 978-0465095742
- 2005, contributor, Handbook of psychobiography. Edited by William Todd Schultz. Oxford: Oxford University Press. ISBN 9780195168273
- 2012, The abyss of madness. New York: Routledge. ISBN 978-0415897105
- 2019, with R.D. Stolorow, The power of phenomenology: Psychoanalytic and philosophical perspectives. New York: Routledge. ISBN 978-1138328563
- 2021, with M.F. Alvarez MF, The paradox of suicide and creativity: Authentications of human existence. Lanham: Lexington Books. ISBN 978-1498523820
