= Lois Bloom =

American developmental psychologist

- Title: Professor Emerita of Psychology and Education
- Awards: ASHA Honors (1992); G. Stanley Hall Medal (1997); SRCD Distinguished Scientific Contributions Award (2003)

Academic background
- Education: Pennsylvania State University (BA); University of Maryland (MA); Columbia University (PhD)

Academic work
- Discipline: Psychology
- Sub-discipline: Developmental psychology
- Institutions: Columbia University
- Main interests: language development

Lois Masket Bloom was an American developmental psychologist and Edward Lee Thorndike Professor Emerita of Psychology and Education at Teachers College, Columbia University. Her pioneering research elucidated the roles of cognition, emotion, and social behavior in language acquisition.

Bloom is the author of several books on language acquisition, including One Word At a Time: The Use of Single-Word Utterances Before Syntax, the culmination of Bloom's first longitudinal study, and the first-ever published study of language acquisition to use video-recorded data. Language Development From Two To Three a collection of findings from research studies spanning two decades, highlights the tremendous achievements in language acquisition that occur during this period of childhood. For Language Development and Language Disorders, which she co-wrote with Margaret Lahey, Bloom connected her research with her early experience as a speech therapist working with language-delayed children. It offers guidelines for speech therapists assessing and assisting children with language delays. The Transition From Infancy to Language: Acquiring the Power of Expression was the inaugural winner of the Eleanor E. Maccoby Book Award from the American Psychological Association, Division 7, which recognizes the author of influential books in the field of developmental psychology.

== Education ==
Bloom received her B.A. in 1956 from Pennsylvania State University, where she is a distinguished alumna. Today, the Penn State Child Study Center holds annual Lois Bloom Lecture on child development, funded by gifts from Bloom and psychologist Edward Lee Thorndike.

Bloom earned her M.A. at the University of Maryland in 1958, and her Ph.D. with distinction at Columbia University in 1968. Her dissertation, Language Development: Form and Function in Emerging Grammars, was supervised by sociolinguist William Labov. Her research, involving case studies of the early utterances of three children, was highly influential in the field of language acquisition.

== Awards ==
Bloom received the Distinguished Achievement Award by the New York City Speech-Hearing-Language Association in 1986, and received honors from the American Speech–Language–Hearing Association in 1992. She received the G. Stanley Hall Medal from the American Psychological Association for Distinguished Contributions to Developmental Psychology in 1997, and the Distinguished Scientific Contribution Award from the Society for Research in Child Development in 2003.

== Research ==
Bloom's research helped usher in a semantic revolution in the field of language acquisition. Linguist and philosopher Noam Chomsky hypothesized a “language acquisition device”—hard-wired structures in the brain dedicated to language acquisition—to account for the speed with which infants learn language. In contrast, Bloom's research, according to The New York Times, "pioneered the new trend" of examining children's two-word utterances for semantic intent as well as word distribution. By focusing on the semantics of children's utterances, she demonstrated that language reflects how children make meaning out of their previously non-linguistic representations of knowledge.

Throughout her career, Bloom remained focused on placing the child, and his or her environment, at the center of her research. In her keynote address at Boston University's 25th Conference on Language development, Bloom discussed her concern that advances in technology allowed researchers to study a child's utterances while ignoring the context in which the child produces that language. In The Intentionality Model and Language Acquisition, she refers to the "authority of the child"—of central importance is the child's contents of mind, which he or she expresses through language and behavior. According to Bloom's theory, interaction with the world, and the feedback that results, drives development. The intentionality model Bloom developed with researcher Erin Tinker depicts language development as the result of engagement and effort. It takes work to acquire language, and engagement with one's environment motivates the child to do that work. Knowledge of language, according to this model, exists at the intersection of use, content, and form—all are necessary for language to develop. Based on her findings that highly emotional babies are slower to learn language, Bloom theorized that babies learn best when they are able to focus on the environment, rather than on their own feelings.

Bloom contributed three longitudinal corpora to the CHILDES database. These files comprise the recordings and transcripts of three children's language development (Eric, Gia, and Peter) that Bloom collected for her dissertation.

== Selected articles ==
- Bloom, L. (1975). Language development review. In F. Horowitz (Ed.) Review of child development research, Volume 4 (pp. 245–303). University of Chicago Press.
- Bloom, L., Hood, L., & Lightbown, P. (1974). Imitation in language development: If, when and why. Cognitive Psychology, 6, 380–420.
- Bloom, L., Lahey, M., Hood, L., Lifter, K., & Fiess, K. (1980). Complex sentences: Acquisition of syntactic connectives and the semantic relations they encode. Journal of Child Language, 7(2), 235–261.
- Bloom, L., Lightbown, P., & Hood, L. (1975). Structure and variation in child language. Monographs of the Society for Research in Child Development, 40 (2, Serial No. 160).
- Bloom, L., Merkin, S., & Wootten, J. (1982). "Wh"-questions: Linguistic factors that contribute to the sequence of acquisition. Child Development, 53 (4), 1084–1092.
- Bloom, L. & Tinker, E. (2001). The intentionality model and language acquisition: Engagement, effort, and the essential tension in development. Monographs of the Society for Research in Child Development, 66 (4, Serial No. 267).
