= Beatrice Beebe =

Clinical professor

- Citizenship: United States of America
- Occupation: Clinical Professor of Medical Psychology
- Spouse: Edward McCrorie
- Awards: Morton Schillinger Award (2008)

Academic background
- Education: Barnard College, Columbia University, Teacher's College

Beatrice Beebe (born June 8, 1946) is a clinical psychologist known for her research in attachment and early infant-parent communication. Her work helped established the importance of non-verbal communication in early child development. She is a Clinical Professor of Medical Psychology at the College of Physicians & Surgeons, Columbia University and the director of the Communications Science Lab at the New York State Psychiatric Institute (NYSPI).

Beebe received the Morton Schillinger Award in 2008, along with Frank Lachmann, for their "unique and fundamental contributions to psychoanalytic theory".

== Biography ==
Beebe was born in Washington, DC. In her book, Infant Research and Adult Treatment, she describes Heinz Werner and Jean Piaget as her earliest influences.

Beebe received a B.A. from Barnard College in 1968. She attended graduate school at Columbia University, Teacher's College where she obtained a joint Ph.D. in Developmental and Clinical Psychology in 1973, under the supervision of Daniel Stern. Her dissertation examined the complex behaviors behind positive infant affect and how mothers interpreted their child's responsiveness. Beebe used frame-by-frame analysis of videotapes (video microanalysis) of mother-child dyads playing to collect this data, a research method she continues to use today.

After graduate school, Beebe continued her work with Stern as a postdoctoral fellow at NYSPI from 1973 to 1975. During this period she discovered the chase and dodge pattern between mother and infant, where the mother follows the child's movement and the child moves their head back and away. Beebe described this as "an early example of bidirectional influence" and evidence that the infant, along with the mother, is directly influencing the relationship. After her fellowship, she worked at Yeshiva University from 1976 to 1992, and remained at NYSPI where she ran and continues to run the Communications Science Lab. Stern and Joseph Jaffe, a Clinical Professor of Psychiatry at Columbia, were her closest research collaborators until they both died in 2012. In 1995 she joined the faculty at the College of Physicians & Surgeons, Columbia University.

In 2018, Beebe received a research grant from the National Institute of Health to study how exposure to endocrine disrupting pollutants in utero alters mother-infant interaction and infant development. She is also conducting a 30-year follow up study that attempts to predict attachment style in young adulthood based on the research participant's attachment style from infancy.

As a psychoanalyst, Beebe treated the philosopher and author Gordon Marino. She received a Certificate Specialization Psychotherapy - Psychoanalysis from New York University in 1986, and is a founding faculty member at the Institute for The Psychoanalytic Study of Subjectivity.

Beebe is married to Edward McCrorie, a Professor Emeritus of English at Providence College.

== Research ==
Influenced by Jaffe's book, Rhythms of Dialogue, which analyzed adult face to face speech patterns, Beebe and Jaffe set out in the early 1980s to apply the same principles of adult conversation to interactions between caregivers and their infants. This project culminated in a 2001 research monograph, Rhythms of Dialogue in Infancy, that linked infant-parent and infant-stranger vocal coordination at four months to 12-month infant attachment and cognition. In an autobiographical paper, Beebe described vocal coordination as "matched durations of switching pauses at the point of the turn exchange". In their monograph, Beebe and Jaffe found that midrange vocal coordination between mother-infant dyads and stranger-infant dyads predicted a secure attachment, and the infant's interaction with a stranger predicted developmental outcomes just as well as their interaction with their mother. The researchers also found that a high degree of vocal coordination between infant and stranger predicted optimal cognition, as measured by the Bayley Scales.

Consistent with the concept of "good enough" mothering proposed by the Pediatrician and Psychoanalyst Donald Winnicott, Beebe hypothesized that mid-range coordination between mother and infant was optimal because it left room for flexibility, variability, and inventiveness, all of which could lead to the type of playfulness that is critical to development. A mother that has high or low coordination with their child, on the other hand, is likely to have an attunement defined by vigilance or inhibition. An APA review said Beebe and Jaffe's monograph provided clear and empirically supported evidence for some of the core ideas of psychoanalysis.

In 1999, Beebe received a research grant from the National Institute of Mental Health to analyze video from 132 mother-infant dyads. The research project culminated in a 2010 paper that found attachment outcomes at 12-months could be predicted by just 2.5 minutes of video microanalysis of mother-infant interactions. In addition, her paper demonstrated that disorganized attachment—characterized by an infant who has no coherent strategy for relating to their caregiver—can also be predicted from mother-infant interaction at four-months. According to Beebe, the infants on their way to a disorganized attachment strategy exhibited "discrepant, contradictory, and conflicted patterns of communication with their mothers, in the context of intense, sometimes frantic, infant distress".

== Books ==
- Beebe, B., Cohen, P., Lachmann, F., & Yothers, D. I. (2016). The mother-infant interaction picture book: Origins of attachment. WW Norton & Co.
- Beebe, B., & Lachmann, F. M. (2013). Infant research and adult treatment: Co-constructing interactions. Routledge.
- Beebe, B., & Lachmann, F. M. (2014). The origins of attachment: Infant research and adult treatment. Routledge.
- Beebe, B., Knoblauch, S., & Rustin, J. (2005). Forms of intersubjectivity in infant research and adult treatment. Other PressLlc.

Beebe has co-written a number of influential books on parent-child interaction and attachment. The Institute for InterGroup Understanding said her infant interaction picture book, which depicts how early infant-parent interactions can predict attachment security, was required reading for "anyone who is concerned about the developmental future of children in this country". In Infant Research and Adult Treatment, Beebe interweaves a variety of infant research, including her own, and clinical vignettes of adult treatments to demonstrate how psychotherapists can use what we know about early infant development and non-verbal communication to treat patients with psychopathology.

== Representative publications ==
- Beebe, B., Jaffe, J., Lachmann, F., Feldstein, S., Crown, C., & Jasnow, M. (2000). Systems models in development and psychoanalysis: The case of vocal rhythm coordination and attachment. Infant Mental Health Journal: Official Publication of The World Association for Infant Mental Health, 21(1-2), 99–122.
- Beebe, B., Jaffe, J., Markese, S., Buck, K., Chen, H., Cohen, P., ... & Feldstein, S. (2010). The origins of 12-month attachment: A microanalysis of 4-month mother–infant interaction. Attachment & Human Development, 12(1-2), 3–141.
- Beebe, B., & Lachmann, F. M. (1988). The contribution of mother-infant mutual influence to the origins of self-and object representations. Psychoanalytic Psychology, 5(4), 305–337.
- Jaffe, J., Beebe, B., Feldstein, S., Crown, C. L., Jasnow, M. D., Rochat, P., & Stern, D. N. (2001). Rhythms of dialogue in infancy: Coordinated timing in development. Monographs of the Society for Research in Child Development, i-149.
