= Intersubjectivity =

Concept in philosophy and psychology

The terms intersubjectivity and intersubjective describe the capacity to share feelings and understandings which affords interpersonal communication.

Notions of intersubjectivity appeared early in the 1900s, one example being a 1903 textbook by George Stout called The Ground Work of Psychology. In the late 1920s and 1930s, the phenomenological philosophy of Edmund Husserl incorporated the concept of intersubjectivity into the fifth of his Cartesian Meditations. Husserl's work led Jacques Lacan to introduce a sophisticated four-cornered notion of intersubjectivity into his treatment of the structure of psychoanalytic dialogue in the 1950s. Then in 1970 the concept of intersubjectivity was taken up by Jurgen Habermas in his critique of Noam Chomsky's grammar-based account of language acquisition as lacking any way of accounting for infants' mastery of the performative or agentic dimension of speech (as treated by speech act theory). Such mastery was something which Habermas argued language-use required, and the work of researchers like Lois Bloom proved to exist, prior to infants' first meaningful employment of words and grammar. Preverbal infants must therefore have an awareness of what Habermas called 'dialogue-constitutive universals': it was this capacity which underpinned their ability intentionally to decode and influence other speakers' intentions -- and Habermas called it intersubjectivity.

Habermas's work was quickly taken up by the philosopher and feminist Joanna Ryan whose essay 'Early Language Development: Towards a Communicational Analysis' was circulating in photocopied form as early as 1972. Her essay inspired Colwyn Trevarthen to assert that his films of eight-week-olds and their mothers engaging in face-to-face 'conversations' proved that humans are born possessing innate intersubjectivity. The idea that preverbal infants manifested a capacity for intersubjectivity was soon taken up by other psychologists like Jerome Bruner.

== Definition ==
Intersubjectivity is a term coined by social scientists around 1900 to refer to the psychical capacities affording interpersonal communication. The term was introduced to psychoanalysis by Jacques Lacan in the 1950s and later argued by George E. Atwood and Robert Stolorow to be central to the "meta-theory" of psychoanalysis. As a consequence of this chequered history, social psychologists Alex Gillespie and Flora Cornish have been able to assemble seven different definitions of intersubjectivity:

- people's agreement on the shared definition of a concept;
- people's mutual awareness of agreement or disagreement, or of understanding or misunderstanding each other;
- people's attribution of intentionality, feelings, and beliefs to each other;
- people's implicit or automatic behavioral orientations towards other people;
- people's interactive performance within a situation;
- people's shared and taken-for-granted background assumptions, whether consensual or contested; and
- "the variety of possible relations between people's perspectives".

Intersubjectivity has been used in social science to refer to agreement. There is intersubjectivity between people if they agree on a given set of meanings or share the same perception of a situation. Similarly, Thomas Scheff defines intersubjectivity as "the sharing of subjective states by two or more individuals".

Intersubjectivity also has been used to refer to the common-sense, shared meanings constructed by people in their interactions with each other and used as an everyday resource to interpret the meaning of elements of social and cultural life. If people share common sense, then they share a definition of the situation.

Psychoanalyst Jessica Benjamin, in The Bonds of Love, wrote, "The concept of intersubjectivity has its origins in the social theory of Jürgen Habermas (1970), who used the expression 'the intersubjectivity of mutual understanding' to designate an individual capacity and a social domain." Psychoanalyst Molly Macdonald argued in 2011 that a "potential point of origin" for the term was in Jean Hyppolite's use of l'inter-subjectivité in an essay from 1955 on "The Human Situation in the Hegelian Phenomenology". However, the phenomenologist Edmund Husserl, whose work Habermas and Hyppolite draw upon, made earlier use of the term, which was subsequently elaborated upon by other phenomenologists such as Edith Stein, Emmanuel Levinas, and Maurice Merleau-Ponty.

== Philosophy ==
Contemporarily, intersubjectivity is the major topic in both the analytic and the continental traditions of philosophy. Intersubjectivity is considered crucial not only at the relational level but also at the epistemological and even metaphysical levels. For example, intersubjectivity is postulated as playing a role in establishing the truth of propositions, and constituting the intersubjective agreement of an experience of an object.

A central concern in consciousness studies of the past 50 years is the so-called problem of other minds, which asks how we can justify our belief that people have minds much like our own and predict others' mind-states and behavior, as our experience shows we often can. Contemporary philosophical theories of intersubjectivity need to address the problem of other minds.

In the debate between cognitive individualism and cognitive universalism, some aspects of thinking are neither solely personal nor fully universal. Cognitive sociology proponents argue for intersubjectivity—an intermediate perspective of social cognition that provides a balanced view between personal and universal views of our social cognition. This approach suggests that, instead of being individual or universal thinkers, human beings subscribe to "thought communities"—communities of differing beliefs. Thought community examples include churches, professions, scientific beliefs, generations, nations, and political movements. This perspective explains why each individual thinks differently from another (individualism): person A may choose to adhere to expiry dates on foods, but person B may believe that expiry dates are only guidelines and it is still safe to eat the food days past the expiry date. But not all human beings think the same way (universalism).

Intersubjectivity argues that each thought community shares social experiences that are different from the social experiences of other thought communities, creating differing beliefs among people who subscribe to different thought communities. These experiences transcend our subjectivity, which explains why they can be shared by the entire thought community. Proponents of intersubjectivity support the view that individual beliefs are often the result of thought community beliefs, not just personal experiences or universal and objective human beliefs. Beliefs are recast in terms of standards, which are set by thought communities.

=== Phenomenology ===
Edmund Husserl, the founder of phenomenology, recognized the importance of intersubjectivity, and wrote extensively on the topic. In German, his writings on intersubjectivity are gathered in volumes 13–15 of the Husserliana. In English, his best-known text on intersubjectivity is the Cartesian Meditations (it is this text that features solely in the Husserl reader entitled The Essential Husserl). Although Husserlian phenomenology is often charged with methodological solipsism, in the fifth Cartesian Meditation, Husserl attempts to grapple with the problem of intersubjectivity and puts forward his theory of transcendental, monadological intersubjectivity.

Husserl's student Edith Stein extended intersubjectivity's basis in empathy in her 1917 doctoral dissertation, On the Problem of Empathy (Zum Problem der Einfühlung).

== Psychology ==
Discussions and theories of intersubjectivity are prominent and of importance in contemporary psychology, theory of mind, and consciousness studies. Three major contemporary theories of intersubjectivity are theory theory, simulation theory, and interaction theory.

Shannon Spaulding, Assistant Professor of Philosophy at Oklahoma State University, wrote:

Theory theorists argue that we explain and predict behaviour by employing folk psychological theories about how mental states inform behaviour. With our folk psychological theories, we infer from a target's behaviour what his or her mental states probably are. And from these inferences, plus the psychological principles in the theory connecting mental states to behavior, we predict the target's behaviour (Carruthers and Smith 1996; Davies and Stone 1995a; Gopnik and Wellman 1992; Nichols and Stich 2003).

Simulation theorists, on the other hand, claim that we explain and predict others' behaviour by using our own minds as a model and "putting ourselves in another's shoes"—that is, by imagining what our mental states would be and how we would behave if we were in the other's situation. More specifically, we simulate what the other's mental states could have been to cause the observed behaviour, then use the simulated mental states, pretend beliefs, and pretend desires as input, running them through our own decision-making mechanism. We then take the resulting conclusion and attribute it to the other person. Authors like Vittorio Gallese have proposed a theory of embodied simulation that refers to neuroscientific research on mirror neurons and phenomenological research.

Spaulding noted that this debate has stalled in the past few years, with progress limited to articulating various hybrid simulation theories—"theory theory" accounts. To resolve this impasse, authors like Shaun Gallagher put forward interaction theory. Gallagher writes that an "... important shift is taking place in social cognition research, away from a focus on the individual mind and toward ... participatory aspects of social understanding...." Interaction theory is put forward to "galvanize" the interactive turn in explanations of intersubjectivity. Gallagher defines an interaction as two or more autonomous agents engaged in co-regulated coupling behavior. For example, when walking a dog, both the owner's behavior is regulated by the dog stopping and sniffing, and the dog's behavior is regulated by the lead and the owner's commands. Ergo, walking the dog is an example of an interactive process. For Gallagher, interaction and direct perception constitute what he terms "primary" (or basic) intersubjectivity.

Studies of dialogue and dialogism reveal how language is deeply intersubjective. When we speak, we always address our interlocutors, taking their perspective and orienting to what we think they think (or, more often, don't think). Within this tradition of research, it has been argued that the structure of individual signs or symbols, the basis of language, is intersubjective and that the psychological process of self-reflection entails intersubjectivity. Recent research on mirror neurons provides evidence for the deeply intersubjective basis of human psychology, and arguably much of the literature on empathy and theory of mind relates directly to intersubjectivity.

== In child development ==
Colwyn Trevarthen has applied intersubjectivity to the very rapid cultural development of new born infants. Research suggests that as babies, humans are biologically wired to "coordinate their actions with others". This ability to coordinate and sync with others facilitates cognitive and emotional learning through social interaction. Additionally, the most socially productive relationship between children and adults is bidirectional, where both parties actively define a shared culture. The bidirectional aspect lets the active parties organize the relationship how they see fit—what they see as important receives the most focus. Emphasis is placed on the idea that children are actively involved in how they learn, using intersubjectivity.

=== Across cultures ===
The ways intersubjectivity occurs varies across cultures. In certain Indigenous American communities, nonverbal communication is so prevalent that intersubjectivity may occur regularly amongst all members of the community, in part perhaps due to a "joint cultural understanding" and a history of shared endeavors. This "joint cultural understanding" may develop in small, Indigenous American communities where children have grown up embedded in their community's values, expectations, and livelihoods—learning through participation with adults rather than through intent verbal instruction—working in cohesion with one another in shared endeavors on a daily basis. Having grown up within this context may have led to members of this community to have what is described by some as a "blending of agendas", or by others as a "dovetailing of motives". If community or family members have the same general goals in mind they may thus act cohesively within an overlapping state of mind. Whether persons are in each other's presence or merely within the same community this blending of agendas or dovetailing of motives enables intersubjectivity to occur within these shared endeavors.

The cultural value of respeto may also contribute to intersubjectivity in some communities; unlike the English definition of 'respect', respeto refers loosely to a mutual consideration for others' activities, needs, wants, etc. Similar to "putting yourself in another's shoes" the prevalence of respeto in certain Indigenous American communities in Mexico and South America may promote intersubjectivity as persons act in accordance with one another within consideration for the community or the individual's current needs or state of mind.

Shared reference during an activity facilitates learning. Adults either teach by doing the task with children, or by directing attention toward experts. Children that had to ask questions in regard to how to perform a task were scolded for not learning by another's example, as though they were ignoring the available resources to learn a task, as seen in Tz'utujil Maya parents who scolded questioning children and asking "if they had eyes".

Children from the Chillihuani village in the Andean mountains learned to weave without explicit instruction. They learned the basic technique from others by observing, eager to participate in their community. The learning process was facilitated by watching adults and by being allowed to play and experiment using tools to create their own weaving techniques.

== See also ==
- Collaborative intelligence
- Collective intelligence
- Consensus reality
- Double hermeneutic
- Epistemic democracy
- Intersubjective verifiability
- Intersubjective psychoanalysis
- Perspectivism
- Reflexivity (social theory)
- Social epistemology
